= Erotic memoir =

Subgenre of erotic literature

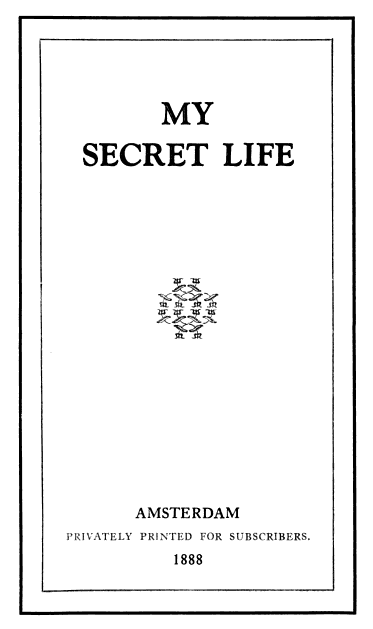
The title page of a My Secret Life reprint published in 1888

Erotic memoirs are a subgenre of erotic literature that blend personal experiences with sensual storytelling.

== History ==
=== 19th century ===
Erotic memoirs include Casanova's Histoire de ma vie, from the 18th century. Notable English works of this genre from the 19th century include The Ups and Downs of Life (1867) by Edward Sellon and My Secret Life by "Walter". Edward Sellon was a writer, translator and illustrator of erotic literature who wrote erotica for the pornographic publisher William Dugdale, including such works as The New Epicurean (1865). The true identity of "Walter" is unknown. Ian Gibson, in The Erotomaniac speculates that My Secret Life was actually written by Henry Spencer Ashbee and therefore it is possible that "Walter" is a fiction.

A famous German erotic work of this time, published in two parts in 1868 and 1875 entitled Pauline the Prima Donna purports to be the memoirs of the opera singer Wilhelmine Schröder-Devrient. Various discrepancies with known facts of the singer's life, however, have led many to doubt the veracity of this book and the erotic adventures contained in the second volume, at least, appear to be implausible. These include the author indulging in lesbian sadomasochism, group sex, sodomy, bestiality, scatology, necrophilia, prostitution, and vampirism all before she had reached the age of 27.

=== 20th century ===
20th-century contributions to the genre include Frank Harris's My Life and Loves (1922–27) and the convicted Austrian sex criminal Edith Cadivec's Confessions and Experiences and its sequel Eros, the Meaning of My Life (published together 1930–1).

=== 21st century ===
A 21st-century example is One Hundred Strokes of the Brush Before Bed (2004) by Melissa Panarello.

== See also ==
- Bedroom farce
- Femdom
- Hispano-Arabic homoerotic poetry
- List of authors of erotic works
- List of genres
- List of pornographic book publishers
- Literotica
- Pornography
- Pornotopia
- Romance novel
- Sex-positive movement
- Erotic literature and art in ancient Rome
