= The Lustful Turk =

British exploitation erotic epistolary novel

The Lustful Turk, or Lascivious Scenes from a Harem is a pre-Victorian British exploitation erotic epistolary novel first published anonymously in 1828 by John Benjamin Brookes and reprinted by William Dugdale. However, it was not widely known or circulated until the 1893 edition.

== Plot ==
The novel consists largely of a series of letters written by its heroine, Emily Barlow, to her friend, Sylvia Carey. When Emily sails from England for India in June 1814 her ship is attacked by Moorish pirates and she is taken to the harem of Ali, dey of Algiers. Ali rapes her and subjects her to his will, awakening her sexual passions. Emily's debasement continues when Ali insists on anal sex, arousing the horror of her correspondent Sylvia, who expresses her indignation at Ali's behaviour, in a letter that the latter intercepts. Annoyed at her attitude, Ali arranges for Sylvia to be abducted and brought to the slave market of Algiers. After an elaborate charade in which Ali pretends to be a sympathetic Frenchman, bidding to save her from sexual slavery, and engaging her in a fake marriage, he deflowers her and awakens her sexuality, as he had done with Emily. Revealing his true identity Ali enjoys both girls together. This sexual idyll is eventually terminated when an addition to the harem objects to anal rape, cuts off Ali's penis with a knife, and then commits suicide. Seemingly unfazed by this, Ali has "his lost members preserved in spirits of wine in glass vases" which he presents to Emily and Sylvia, sending them back to England with these tokens of his affection.

The novel also incorporates interpolated stories concerning the erotic misadventures of three other girls abducted into the harem, and enlarges on the fate of Emily's maid Eliza who, presented by Ali to Muzra, bey of Tunis, is bound, flogged and raped in turn.

The book was one of those condemned as obscene by Lord Chief Justice Campbell when Dugdale was prosecuted in 1857.

== Influences ==
The Lustful Turk uses the contemporary conventions of the novel of sensibility and Gothic romance and its exotic Oriental themes are influenced by the life, adventures and writings of Lord Byron. It was influential on many other works of erotica, and the theme of the virgin who is forcibly introduced to sexual acts and later becomes insatiable in her appetite for the carnal is common in later erotica. Such works include The Way of a Man with a Maid, a classic work of Victorian erotica concerning the forcible seduction of a girl called Alice by a Victorian gentleman, May's Account of Her Introduction to the Art of Love, first published in the Victorian erotic periodical The Pearl, and the novel The Sheik written by Edith Maude Hull, published in 1921.

== Adaptations ==
Trailer for the 1968 film adaptation

A film adaptation of The Lustful Turk was directed in 1968 by Byron Mabe with the screenplay written by David Friedman and starring Abbe Rentz, Linda Stiles and Gee Gentell.

Ingrid Steeger played Eliza in the Erwin C. Dietrich production The Lustful Turk (1971).

In the mystery novel Die for Love by Barbara Mertz (under the pseudonym Elizabeth Peters), plagiarism of The Lustful Turk is a minor plot point.

== Oriental setting ==
Whereas Steven Marcus employed The Lustful Turk in his construction of the placeless realm of pornotopia in Victorian erotica, later writers have stressed the importance of the orientalist setting in generating a further sexualised charge—the harem as a sort of erotic finishing-school.

== See also ==
- A Night in a Moorish Harem
