= Victorian erotica =

19th-century British sexual art and literature

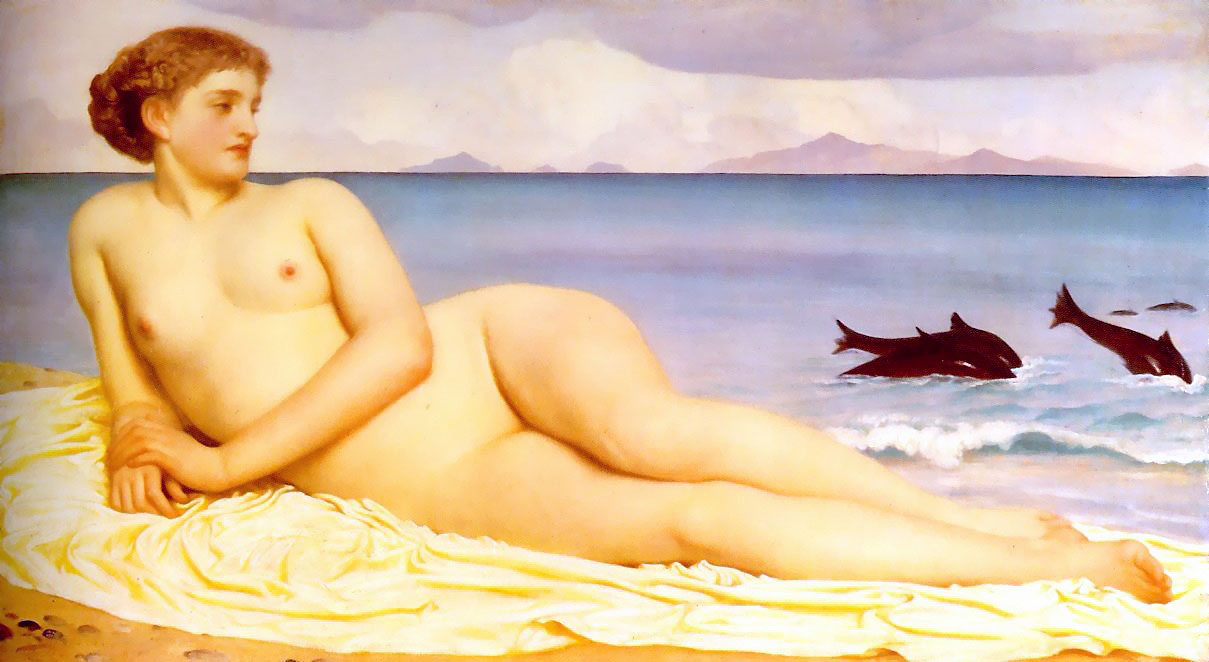
Actaea, the Nymph of the Shore (1868), an oil painting by Frederic Leighton. His paintings were enormously popular during his lifetime.

Victorian erotica is a genre of sexual art and literature which emerged in the Victorian era of 19th-century Britain. Victorian erotica emerged as a product of a Victorian sexual culture. The Victorian era was characterized by paradox of rigid morality and anti-sensualism, but also by an obsession with sex. Sex was a main social topic, with progressive and enlightened thought pushing for sexual restriction and repression. Overpopulation was a societal concern for the Victorians, thought to be the cause of famine, disease, and war. To curb the threats of overpopulation (especially of the poor) and to solve other social issues that were arising at the time, sex was socially regulated and controlled. New sexual categories emerged as a response, defining normal and abnormal sex. Heterosexual sex between married couples became the only form of sex socially and morally permissible. Sexual pleasure and desire beyond heterosexual marriage was labelled as deviant, considered to be sinful and sinister. Such deviant forms included masturbation, homosexuality, prostitution and pornography. Procreation was the primary goal of sex, removing it from the public, and placing it in the domestic. Yet, Victorian anti-sexual attitudes were contradictory of genuine Victorian life, with sex underlying much of the cultural practice. Sex was simultaneously repressed and proliferated. Sex was featured in medical manuals such as The Sexual Impulse by Havelock Ellis and Functions and Disorders of Reproductive Organs by William Acton, and in cultural magazines like The Penny Magazine and The Rambler. Sex was popular in entertainment, with much of Victorian theatre, art and literature including and expressing sexual and sensual themes.

== General ==
Historian Peter Webb writes that there are two categories of Victorian erotica: on the one hand the expressive writings of Oscar Wilde and Swinburne, and on the other hand the "coldly calculated indulgence in male fantasy" such as is found in The Memoirs of Dolly Morton, where women are depicted merely as sex objects.

Art and literature provided Victorians with an avenue to express transgressive and repressed sexual desire. Sex was a prominent feature in much of Victorian art, especially in theatre and literature. Sex was often illustrated by stories of deviance and scandal. It is argued that some Victorian erotica rests on techniques of implication and allusion to sexual desires and activity, such as in the works of Wilde, Dickens, and Field. Yet there are also explicitly sexual works, as compiled in Henry Spencer Ashbee's Forbidden Books of the Victorians, in which the books describe sex in much erotic detail. Such Victorian works include The Romance of Lust, My Secret Life, and Venus in Furs. Additional Victorian artists and authors include Aubrey Beardsley (the illustrator of Wilde's Salome), and many literary and artistic worked by "Anonymous."

== The female sexual object ==
A main component of Victorian erotica was the female sexual object. Women were increasingly being defined in terms of femininity, subordination, and the object of sexual desire. Aesthetic and medical procedures were targeting women to accentuate their sex appeal. In real Victorian life, female sexuality was problematic, and was only to be expressed in terms of domestic life.

On the stage, in art, or in literature, women were inscribed with sexuality, positioned as the sexual object. Societal expectations tied women to ideas of purity and virginity. Erotic plot lines and themes sought to shatter these expectations, crafting women as whores, prostitutes, and adulterers. Women were symbol of vice and temptation. Men were thought to be victims of the female seductress, and were the primary spectators and consumers of female erotica. Themes of same-sex erotica were avoided.

Erotic stimulation was usually implied or suggested. Female erotica was marked through clothing, hairstyles, corseted silhouettes, shoes and headgear. Explicit nudity was rare, with arousal coming from the process of undressing. Rather than the breast or buttocks, legs were a major source of sexual arousal. Veiling and silhouetting were popular modes of titillation, with brief uncovering of legs, or silhouetted outlines of naked women creating voyeuristic arousal.

=== The fallen woman ===
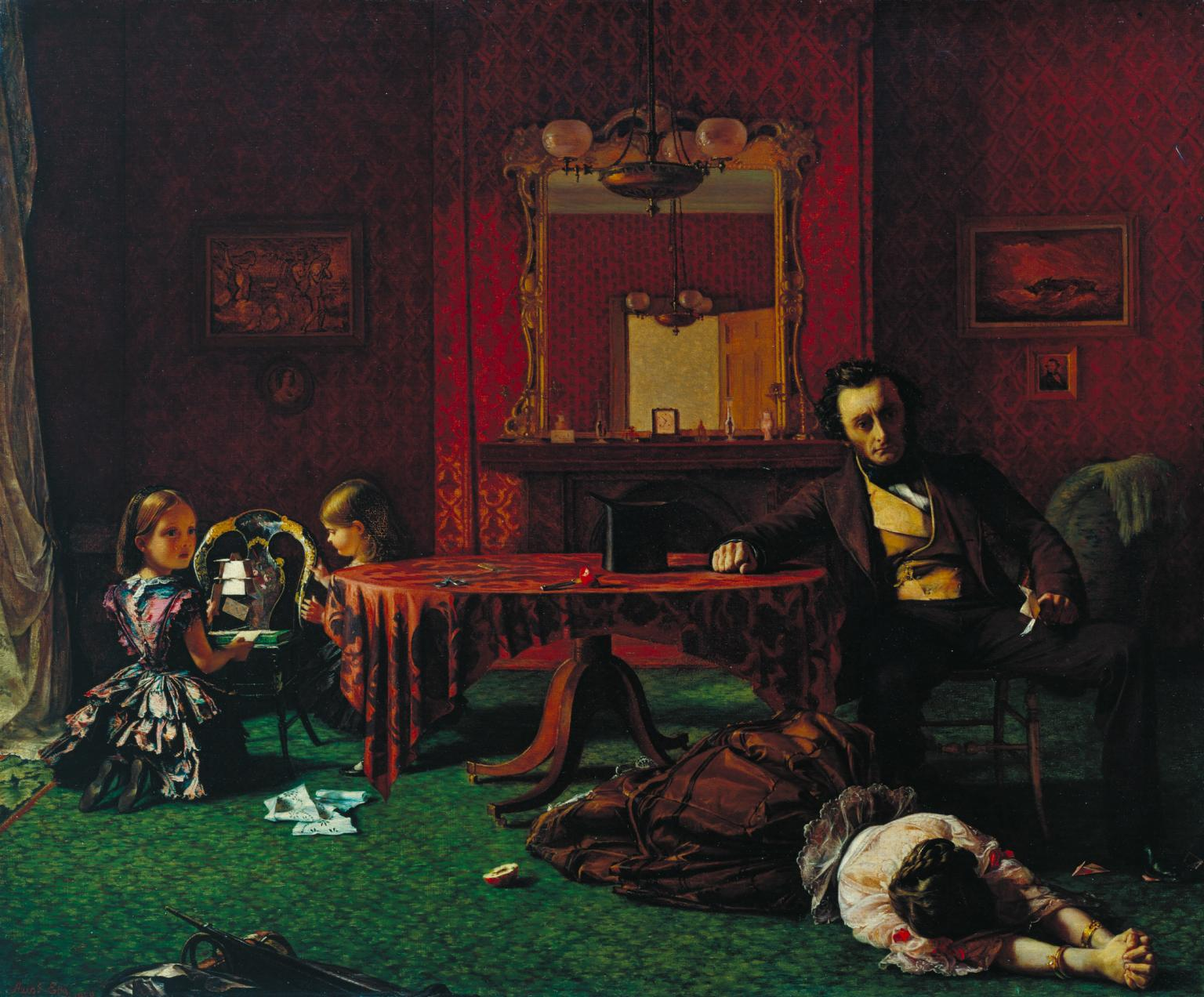
Augustus Egg's Past and Present (1858) depicting the "Fallen Woman"

The fallen woman was a key stereotype for Victorian erotica. The fallen woman was characterized in opposition to the Victorian moral standard for women. Women were expected to be sexually pure and virtuous, with their role being mothers and domestic caregivers. The fallen woman was a prostitute, sexual deviant, or wife unable to perform her domestic duties. This woman, whether driven by economic problems or greed, was thought to have fallen from virtue. Social anxieties over the sexuality and independence of women produced the image of the fallen woman. Erotic images and narratives often portrayed these fallen women needing to be rescued from her vices, and to be reformed into the proper position in family life. The fallen woman is featured in much of Victorian erotic literature, including works by Thomas Hardy, Augustus Egg, and William Bell Scott.

== Same-sex erotica ==
Art and literature allowed the expression of a homosexual identity. Art and literature were the primary mode in which positive images of homosexuality could be produced. Homosexual artists such as Pater, Wilde, Symonds, and Solomon, threaded homosexual themes and identities through their work.

The Sins of the Cities of the Plain; or, The Recollections of a Mary-Ann, is an explicitly homosexual novel written by an anonymous author in 1881. This novel is inspired by John Saul, an Irish male prostitute who was involved in a homosexual scandal in Dublin in 1884.

The Phoenix of Sodom, written by Robert Holloway in 1813, is based on experiences from the famous The Vere Street Coterie.

The Shaftesbury memorial by Alfred Gilbert caused moral scandal and outrage, as the sculpture was deemed subversive of heterosexual standards of the time.

=== Lesbian ===
Michael Field was a pseudonym for the lesbian couple Katherine Bradley and Edith Cooper. Michael Field was a poet, who it is suggested developed a language of love between women. Lesbian sex and emotions were spoken and explored in Field's work, with their position against worldly discrimination. It is discussed that lesbian vocabulary and discourse was not available to Field, so language inherent to heterosexuality such as "marriage", was used as metaphors to describe Field's love.

School Life in Paris, (1897). This is a book made from a compilation of letters from a young British girl, who boarding at a finishing school in Paris, sent letters to her cousin in England. These letters are erotically descriptive, especially of clothing, and describes her mistress as "handsome". The letters also include an explicit scene in which Blanche had to lie naked on her dorm bed, as an initiation into the school's "lesbian society".

Other Lesbian erotic works include The Nunnery Tales (1886), Astrid Cane (1891), and The Mysteries of Verbena House (1882).

== Pornography ==
In the Victorian period, pornography on the market boomed, and was produced in abundance. Before 1864, pornography was described as "obscenity". Only in 1864 was the word "pornography" placed in the dictionary. Pornography was not a clear-cut genre, but a general category of sexual explicitness. There were political concerns that pornography "corrupted private morality" disturbing social order. For the Victorians, pornography was a medium in which they could illustrate repressed and controlled sexual fantasy and desire.

Victorian pornography often depicted the rape, abduction, and subordination of women. Cases and trials of sexual misconduct were a class of their own. Castration was also a theme of Victorian pornography, with it being alluded to the male orgasm. Female characters would threaten to dismember a penis in the height of orgasm, as in The Lustful Turk.

The Pearl: A Journal of Facetiae and Voluptuous Reading was a pornographic magazine published in London in the Victorian era.

Victorian legislation was passed in an attempt to deal with the issue. The Obscene Publications Act 1857 prohibited the distribution and sale of pornography, though not its possession.

Henry Spencer Ashbee is the first bibliographer of pornographic literature.

== See also ==
- Jugum penis
- LGBT rights in the 19th century
- Stag film
- Victorian morality
- Women in the Victorian era
