= William Simpson Potter =

William Simpson Potter (21 January 1805 – 16 January 1879) was a 19th-century English writer. Potter was a friend of Henry Spencer Ashbee, a merchant, bibliographer, bibliophile, authority on the life and works of Miguel de Cervantes, and collector of erotic materials. Ashbee describes Potter as a "shrewd business man, the ardent collector, and the enthusiastic traveller".

According to the bibliography-catalogue, British Museum General Catalogue of Printed Books, Potter is the author of two books of letters describing the Prince of Wales' visit to India in 1875–1876. The British Library has these works in their collection.

A Letter from the East: from William S. Potter, to his niece, Mrs. Addison Potter bears a publication date of 1877 - according to the online catalog record of the British Library. Also in the holdings of the British Library is Letters from India during H. R. H. the Prince of Wales visit in 1875–6, from William S. Potter to his sister, which dates from 1876. Again, according to this British Museum source, Potter is the author of the Victorian erotic novel, The Romance of Lust, (1873–1876) although the published novel lists its author as "Anonymous".

Due to the anonymous authorship, this novel is alternately attributed to Potter and to another English writer of erotic novels, Edward Sellon (1818?–1866). For example, the Library of Congress catalog record for the 1968 Grove Press edition of The Romance of Lust includes the brief note: "Attributed to Capt. Edward Sellon. Cf. Bibliotheca arcana. 1885." The Bibliotheca arcana is a bibliography of erotic literature from the late 19th century.

Henry Spencer Ashbee partially attributes The Romance of Lust to Potter. Ashbee comments that, "The Romance of Lust is not the produce of a single pen, but consists of several tales,'orient pearls at random strung,' woven into a connected narrative by a gentleman, perfectly well known to the present generation of literary eccentrics and collectors, as having amassed one of the most remarkable collections of erotic pictures and bric-a-brac ever brought together."

Comparing the text of Letters from India during H. R. H. the Prince of Wales visit in 1875-6, from William S. Potter to his sister with the text of The Romance of Lust reveals numerous stylistic affinities, whereas a comparison of Sellon's The New Epicurean and The Adventures of a School-Boy shows fewer similarities in authorial style. The Library of Congress has all of these volumes within its collections.

The character 'Mr Chambon' in the anonymously authored The Sins of the Cities of the Plain; or, The Recollections of a Mary-Ann, with Short Essays on Sodomy and Tribadism may be based on Potter, who was a friend of its publisher William Lazenby. In the book, Mr Chambon resides at "in the Cornwall Mansions close to Baker Street Station", while from about 1877 until his death, Potter lived at Cornwall Residences, a now-demolished block of Victorian flats near the Station.

According to Ashbee, Potter "...died January 16, 1879, in his 74th year, at Catania, whither he had repaired for the sake of his health".
