= Pornocracy (disambiguation) =

Saeculum obscurum is a period in the history of the papacy often referred to as the "Pornocracy" or the "Rule of the Harlots".

Pornocracy, from Ancient Greek πόρνη (pórnē, "female prostitute") + -κρατία (-kratíā, "government" or "rule"), may also refer to:

- Pornocrates, an 1878 painting by Félicien Rops
- Anatomy of Hell, a 2004 film by Catherine Breillat based on her 2001 novel Pornocracy
- La Pornocratie, ou les Femmes dans les temps modernes, an 1875 book by Pierre-Joseph Proudhon
- Pornocracy, a 2000 album by the Arrogant Sons of Bitches

== See also ==
- Pornotopia, a pornographic utopia
- Gynecocracy, a government ruled by women
