= My Secret Life (memoir) =

Erotic memoir published from 1888

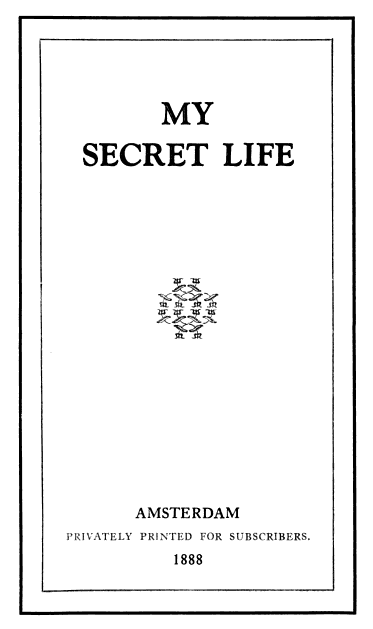
- Title page
- Author: Unknown
- Language: English
- Genre: Memoir
- Publisher: Auguste Brancart
- Publication date: 1888
- Publication place: United Kingdom

My Secret Life, by "Walter", is the memoir of a gentleman describing the author's sexual development and experiences in Victorian England. It was first published in a private edition of eleven volumes, at the expense of the author, including an imperfect index, which appeared over seven years beginning around 1888.

The work itself is enormous, amounting to over one million words, the eleven original volumes amounting to over 4,000 pages. The text is repetitive and highly disorganised, and the literary quality is negligible, but its frank discussion of sexual matters and other hidden aspects of Victorian life makes it a rare and valuable social document. According to Steven Marcus, it is virtually the only source for information on London's houses of prostitution, in which Walter spent many hours. It has been described as "one of the strangest and most obsessive books ever written".

== Publishing and bans ==
The first edition was likely printed by Auguste Brancart, in an impression of only 25 copies.

In the twentieth century, My Secret Life was pirated and reprinted in a number of abridged versions that were frequently suppressed for obscenity. For example, in 1932, a New York publisher was arrested for issuing the first three volumes.

In the USA, it was finally published without censorship in 1966 by Grove Press, but in 1969 a British printer, Arthur Dobson, was sentenced to two years in prison for producing a UK reprint. It was not until 1994 that the work in its entirety was published openly in the UK by Arrow Books.

== Authorship ==
The identity of "Walter" is unknown. There is no scholarly consensus in favour of any of the candidates proposed.

The most commonly suggested author is Henry Spencer Ashbee (1834–1900). He was a book collector, writer and bibliographer, and, from the three volumes he published under his pseudonym Pisanus Fraxi, the expert on erotic books in his day. Gershon Legman was the first to link "Walter" and Ashbee, in his introduction to the 1962 reprints of Ashbee's bibliographies, and the 1966 Grove Press edition of My Secret Life included an expanded version of that essay. Ashbee was also identified as Walter by a May 2000 Channel 4 documentary on British TV, Walter: The Secret Life of a Victorian Pornographer – and in 2001 Ian Gibson's The Erotomaniac: The Secret Life of Henry Spencer Ashbee (2001, ISBN 0-571-19619-5) provided a detailed review of circumstantial evidence arguing that Ashbee wrote My Secret Life, presumably weaving fantasy and anecdotes from friends in with his own real-life experiences. If Ashbee was not the actual author, it is suggested that he may have been the compiler of the work's lengthy, detailed, and very imperfect index, and have provided other editorial assistance and help in getting the book into print.

Conversely, Steven Marcus, in his influential The Other Victorians (1966), concluded that the balance of known facts was against Legman's "shrewd and ingenious guess". Also unconvinced were Phyllis and Eberhard Kronhausen in their detailed study of My Secret Life, Walter, the English Casanova (1967).

A number of other men have been suggested as more likely to be the author, including:

- William Simpson Potter (1805–1879), a known associate of Ashbee, was put forward by Gordon Grimley in his introduction to the 1972 edition of My Secret Life. Grimley is sceptical of Ashbee's candidacy as the main author. According to Ashbee, Potter was involved in authoring The Romance of Lust, an erotic work centred on incest and a range of sexual encounters.
- Charles Stanley, a barrister and stockbroker, was put forward in 2000 by Vern Bullough and Gordon Stein as the most likely candidate, the known facts of whose life best coincide with the internal evidence of the work. "Walter" claimed to be a close friend of the barrister in a famous case of the time, which they identify as the case of R v Richard Clarke in 1854. That barrister, William Overend QC, was a childhood friend of Stanley.
- William Haywood (1821–1894), who was Surveyor and Engineer to the City of London Commissioners of Sewers was suggested by John Patrick Pattinson in 2002 after extensive research.

== Veracity ==
The question of how much the book is a record of true experiences (whether of Ashbee or another writer), and how much is fiction or erotic fantasy can probably never be fully resolved. However, the presence of much mundane detail, the writer's inclusion of incidents that do him little personal credit, and the lack of intrinsically improbable circumstances (in contrast to most Victorian erotica) lend it considerable credibility. In spite of "Walter's" obsessive womanising over a period of several decades, only a few of his partners are of his own social class. The great majority are prostitutes, servants or working class women. This would appear to reflect the realities of his time. Internal evidence from the book suggests that "Walter" was born between 1820 and 1825. In the last volume he notes seeing the books through print, which indicates that he was still alive in the 1890s. In 2018, Simon Young identified Walter's "Madame S–––k–n–us" with Hulda Stockenius, a German-born London brothel keeper who was prosecuted for keeping a disorderly house in 1871. He also suggested that Walter's "Nelly L––l–e" may have been Stockenius's lodger Helen Leslie. Young argued that the evidence indicates that at least some of Walter's account was drawn from life.

== See also ==
- Hannah Cullwick, Victorian diarist who participated in fetishistic roleplay with Arthur Munby
