= Steven Marcus =

American academic and literary critic (1928–2018)

- Born: December 13, 1928; New York City
- Died: April 25, 2018 (aged 89)
- Occupations: Literary Critic, Professor

Education
- Education: Columbia University

Philosophical work
- Main interests: Literary criticism, psychoanalysis, Marxism, pornography
- Notable works: The Other Victorians (1966)
- Notable ideas: Pornotopia

Steven Paul Marcus (December 13, 1928 – April 25, 2018) was an American academic and literary critic who published influential psychoanalytic analyses of the novels of Charles Dickens and Victorian pornography. He was George Delacorte Professor Emeritus in the Humanities at Columbia University.

== Biography ==
=== Early life ===
Steven Marcus was born in New York City, the son of Nathan and Adeline Muriel (née Gordon) Marcus. His grandparents were emigrants from the countryside near Vilnius. Adeline and Nathan, both nominally observant Jews, were raised, met, and married in the Bronx, and Nathan attended business school for two years to become an accountant. Only ten months after Steven was born in 1928, the stock market crashed, leaving his father unemployed for six years and causing the family to slide into poverty. Steven’s sister, Debora, was born in 1936, and the family moved to a lower-class neighborhood in the Bronx called Highbridge, near Yankee Stadium, which was populated by Irish, Italian, and Jewish families. As a child Marcus befriended Stanley Kubrick, and the two remained close until Kubrick's death in 1999.

Marcus attended William Howard Taft and DeWitt Clinton High School and graduated at the age of fifteen in 1944, against the backdrop of World War II. He was admitted with full scholarships to both Columbia University and Harvard University, but because his family could not afford to pay for room and board at Harvard, he attended Columbia, where he studied under Lionel Trilling. Because of his family's economic precariousness, Marcus continued to live at home and carry his lunch to school in a paper bag. Upon graduation, Marcus immediately enrolled in graduate school at Columbia, writing his master's thesis on Henry James under the guidance of F. W. Dupee. After taking his master's degree in 1949, he took an instructorship at Indiana University in Bloomington, where he lived on a pig farm. Marcus was then appointed to a two-year lectureship at Baruch College, and married his first wife. Marcus also had brief stints at the University of North Carolina and the University of Southern California.

In 1952, he earned a fellowship to Cambridge University, where he was pulled into the orbit of F. R. Leavis, even as he rejected Leavis's belittling of Charles Dickens. While still at Cambridge, Marcus's first pieces appeared in the Partisan Review and Commentary in December 1952 and March 1953. He would later recall that the Partisan Review "provided a singular experience of intellectual awakening and intensity. I did not read each issue so much as I gulped it down." When he returned to America in 1954, he was drafted into the army, reported for basic training at Fort Dix, and was deployed to northern Greenland, far from any combat zones. Discharged in 1956, Marcus returned to Columbia, where he defended his dissertation in 1961. Because the committee was stacked with Trilling's academic antagonists, it was a contentious defense, but Marcus passed, in part because of his already significant publication record.

=== Career ===
Immediately after earning his doctorate, Marcus was appointed to an assistant professorship at Columbia as a faculty colleague of Lionel Trilling. The two collaborated to co-edit an abridgment of Ernest Jones's The Life and Work of Sigmund Freud in 1961, and upon Trilling's death Marcus penned a long-form essay on Trilling's legacy as a cultural critic and public intellectual. Carolyn Heilbrun, the first woman to earn tenure in the Columbia English Department, later described Marcus as among Trilling's male acolytes who sought to protect the department's entrenched male dominance. Nevertheless, feminist Kate Millett wrote her dissertation under Marcus's guidance, and when it was published as Sexual Politics shortly thereafter to wide acclaim, Millett singled out Marcus for gratitude in the preface, citing his "intellectual courage".

Marcus finalized his divorce from his first wife, Algene Ballif Marcus, in 1965. He had been introduced to German sociologist Gertrud Lenzer in 1962, who had recently emigrated from Munich after obtaining her PhD from LMU Munich. They married on January 20, 1966. The couple had one child, John Nathaniel Marcus, who would go on to study at Juilliard and develop a career as a violinist.

Marcus was one of six faculty signatories at Columbia in 1967 that pledged to make churches and synagogues refuges for conscientious objectors to the Vietnam War. In the wake of the Columbia University protests of 1968, Marcus was a member and organizer of the Columbia Faculty Peace Action Committee, which endorsed academic strikes as a tactic to bring an end to the war in Indochina and to pressure the university into withdrawing its support for war research.

In 1969, for reprinting the anonymous memoir My Secret Life, Arthur Dobson became the first publisher to be charged in Britain under the Obscene Publications Act 1959, which would also be used to prosecute Penguin Books for publishing Lady Chatterley’s Lover. Marcus was flown in from New York to offer testimony as an expert defense witness. Pressed by the prosecutor to answer whether the author's account of sex with a ten-year-old girl at Vauxhall Gardens was not the most evil passage he had ever read, Marcus replied that accounts of Nazi concentration camps in the twentieth century, or of thirteen-year-old Victorian chimney sweeps dying of cancer of the scrotum in the nineteenth century, were more evil, but no one advocated suppressing this knowledge. The prosecution also accused Marcus of harboring prurient motives for analyzing pornography in The Other Victorians. In the wake of the guilty verdict, the academic journal Victorian Studies printed a defense of the literary merit of My Secret Life from four prominent scholars.

Marcus was a founding organizer of the National Humanities Center and was appointed the chairman of the executive committee board directors from 1976 to 1980. He later served as a fellow between 1980 and 1982 and later remained active in the center as a trustee.

After three years of intensive study, Marcus released the so-called "Marcus Report" as head of the Presidential Commission on Academic Priorities in the Arts and Sciences. The 264-page report was unusually blunt in analyzing the decline in the quality of education offered by Columbia. Its core recommendation was new hiring in the hard sciences and elimination of twelve humanities faculty positions through attrition. A professor of anthropology described the report as "absolutely a mess".

In 1988, paranoid schizophrenic Daniel L. Price heard Marcus give a lecture on one of Wordsworth's "Lucy" poems that addressed the perils of solitude and isolation, and became convinced that Marcus and Joyce Carol Oates were trying to find him a girlfriend. Price inundated Marcus with messages on his answering machine and mailed Marcus a suicide note. In response, Marcus, along with Edward Said, helped to persuade Price to take psychiatric medication by assuring him he was not under surveillance. Price later sent death threats to Marcus and Said, accusing them of "soul murder", and by 1994, Marcus reported that Price had on two occasions used a baseball bat to shatter windows at the English Department before being arrested.

In 1993, the President of Columbia University, George Erik Rupp, in an effort to consolidate sprawling arts and sciences departments, abruptly fired several deans, including Jack Greenberg and Roger Bagnall, without consultation with faculty, and appointed Marcus to serve as both dean of the college and vice president for arts and sciences. Two years later, President Rupp resolved the controversy by splitting the positions and returning Marcus to a teaching and research faculty position. As dean, Marcus had come under fire for being unavailable to meet with students, for being unable to use email, and for reticence to commit resources to develop Asian American and Latin American studies programs. An editorial in the university newspaper compared Marcus to a "giant severed penis". At his departure, he announced that his resignation was for health reasons.

In a special issue of the Partisan Review in 1993, Marcus characterized political correctness as a new incarnation of the "soft totalitarianism" described by George Orwell, whereby orthodoxies "muzzle, stifle, or suppress dissent, and create fear and anxiety in those whose thinking deviates from their prescriptions". In Marcus's account, adherents of political correctness share a number of common features, including a shared sense of victimhood, resentment towards humor, jokes, and comedy, and malice couched in euphemisms. Marcus cited the example of a professor of anthropology denouncing the candy Mars Bars as a confectionery embodiment of America’s indefensible impulse to colonize everything, including extraterrestrial planetary space.

Marcus died at the age of 89 as a result of cardiac arrest.

== Major works ==
=== Dickens: From Pickwick to Dombey ===
Marcus's first scholarly monograph, Dickens: From Pickwick to Dombey, used psychoanalytic and mythological frameworks to analyze seven of Dickens's then neglected early novels. Marcus's arguments would prove exceptionally influential, including claims that the master-concept of Nicholas Nickleby was a hostility to "prudence"; that the abstract principle governing Dombey and Son was resistance to change and temporal decay; that Sam Weller cagily subverts the idealizing morality of Mr. Pickwick; and that Oliver Twist makes its most incisive political indictments through "satiric innocence", or a position of non-partisan humanity. Though immediately recognized as an eminent work of Dickens criticism, Dickens: From Pickwick to Dombey was widely criticized for an over-reliance on Freudian concepts, a tendency that academic reviewers called "facile", "deeply flawed", and, according to Barbara Hardy, "rigidly orthodox" and "tactless". The New York Times review praised Marcus for connecting the "glaring faults of staginess and sentimentality" in Dickens's fiction to the "deep wounds in his personal life", though The Times mocked Marcus for using abstruse and stilted diction such as "hypnagogic phenomenon".

=== The Other Victorians ===
Using a psychoanalytic lexicon developed by Sigmund Freud, The Other Victorians draws on archival materials from the Kinsey Institute to analyze sexual subcultures in nineteenth-century Britain. Marcus culls the official views of Victorian society from physician William Acton, whose writings anxiously deny the existence of childhood sexuality even as they make elaborate recommendations to suppress it. Acton’s later writings about prostitution reveal a more humanizing approach designed to alleviate stigma and reintegrate women into other professions. Marcus also documents the widespread legal and medical panic over masturbation, which was strongly correlated with mental alienation and insanity. Semen was regarded as a finite commodity whose depletion through onanism or wet dreams, known as "spermatorrhoea", was believed to lead to enervation, disease, and eventually death. Marcus contrasts these official views with the clandestine circulation of pornography, records of which were meticulously preserved by Henry Spencer Ashbee’s elaborately annotated indices.

The Other Victorians also provided the first extensive study of the anonymous eleven-volume pornographic memoir My Secret Life, which Marcus took to be an authentic sexual biography inflected with fantasy. Marcus draws out revealing episodes of Walter's sexual life, including the rape of his wife, coerced sex from domestic servants and starving laborers, the insertion of shilling pieces into vaginas to gauge their capacity, and persistent fears of genital inadequacy, castration, and impotence. Through readings of works of obscene literature, including The Lustful Turk and The Victim of Lust, Marcus concludes that the organizing purpose of pornographic fantasy is to reassure the man of the presence and persistence of his genitals. Marcus concludes that pornography is distinct from literature in its singular goal of arousal, its repetitions without fulfillment, and its effort to move beyond language and reality. Marcus’s most famous conceptual contribution is his coinage of the term pornotopia to describe a utopian fantasy of abundance where "all men ... are always and infinitely potent; all women fecundate with lust and flow inexhaustibly with sap or juice or both. Everyone is always ready for everything."

Within weeks of appearing in Britain in 1966, The Other Victorians sailed past Nancy Mitford's biography of Louis XIV to top the national bestseller list.

The initial reception of The Other Victorians was mixed. Diane Darrow found fault with Marcus’s assumption that My Secret Life was an authentic biography, and in the same vein William Shaefer noted that Marcus "treats the book as if it were a verified case history, and thus his sober Freudian analysis at times becomes almost ludicrous". Mike Spilka cautioned that Marcus's conclusions are drawn from a very small sampling of texts, which leads him overestimate the anxiety around depletion of the seminal economy. Robert Philmus similarly expressed regret at Marcus’s "disinclination to assimilate a wider range of literary evidence and historical particulars". In a lengthy review essay, historian Brian Harrison charged that Marcus's unitary ideal of "pornotopia" was based on too few texts; that he omitted a bibliography and references to My Secret Life; that his "research is not sufficiently extensive to bear the weight of his relatively ambitious conclusions"; and that his analysis contains "moralising passages which might well have been uttered by a nineteenth-century clergyman". Meanwhile, in the popular press, a review in The Times described the subject matter as "ghastly stuff" and derided Marcus as "a student of smut who deserves to be admired as much for stamina as for integrity of purpose". In a more laudatory assessment, The New York Times described the work as a "rigidly Freudian" but nonetheless "valuable and perceptive mining operation in Victoriana". In his 2009 preface to the reissue of The Other Victorians, Marcus returned to a Freudian framework to analyze "residues of infantile and childhood sexuality" in contemporary sexual behavior, and observed that women's erotic lives continue to be understudied in the twenty-first century.

Marcus's work set off a flurry of scholarship in nineteenth-century cultural studies, producing book-length works on sexuality, prostitution, masturbation, flagellation, sodomy, and masochism. Michel Foucault developed the most comprehensive challenge to the "repressive hypothesis" that in his view pervades Marcus's account of Victorian sexuality, signaling his challenge to Marcus by entitling Part 1 of his study, "We 'Other' Victorians". Marcus had earlier characterized Foucault's scholarship as "impenetrable" on account of "the author’s arrogance, carelessness, and imprecision". Andrew H. Miller, surveying the critical terrain of sexuality studies three decades later, described The Other Victorians as "the single most influential account of sexuality in Victorian Britain before the work of Foucault".

More recently, Thomas Joudrey has challenged Marcus's concept of pornotopia, explaining: "Far from envisaging a world of endless potency and pleasure, Victorian pornography grapples with the terrifying prospects of bodily decay, suffering, and mortality, placing potency on a razor's edge." Joudrey cites examples of "impotence, syphilitic outbreaks, torn foreskins, severed rods, soiled cocks, and slack vaginas" to illustrate a pervasive pattern of failure and conflict that is fundamentally at odds with "utopian fantasies of purity and immortality". Similarly, though Marcus characterized pornography as apolitical and ahistorical fantasy, Joudrey has cited evidence from the underground Victorian magazine The Pearl of extensive political commentary, including references to the Reform Bills and Contagious Diseases Acts and allusions to many controversial public figures, such as Annie Besant, Charles Spurgeon, Wilfrid Lawson, Newman Hall, Edmund Burke, William Gladstone, and Robert Peel.

=== Engels, Manchester, and the Working Class ===
Marcus takes the inadequacy of previous critical approaches as the impetus for his project about the life of Friedrich Engels in Manchester. Pigenholed as a monument to socialism, an interpretation of Industrial Revolution, or a historical document of urban life, Engels's The Condition of the Working Class in England has been widely misunderstood, Marcus argues, because the brutal demoralization and dehumanization that it documented beggared all description, and therefore a literary approach that takes into account the inadequacies and displacements of language is crucial to understanding it. Engels accomplishment was not so much explaining the material forces that built Manchester into a landscape of industrial squalor, but in reckoning with a spectacle of such enormity that words themselves failed as a means of representation.

The first section pursues the question of why the bourgeois German son of a factory master would forsake his own class. Taking Eric Hobsbawm to task for ignoring psychoanalytic questions altogether, Marcus rejects the simplistic formula of an Oedipal turn on his father, but argues for a more subtle understanding of Engels as envisioning a proletarian fury transformed into consciousness, thereby synthesizing and resolving his admiration and resentment of his own father. Nonetheless, Marcus argues that Engels never could overcome his middle-class feelings of superiority over his romantic partner, Mary Burns, despite his enduring love for her. Marcus then turns to comparing Engels's analysis of Manchester to those of major literary observers, including Charles Dickens, Thomas Carlyle, Benjamin Disraeli, Alexis de Tocqueville, Edwin Chadwick, and French economist Léon Faucher. Marcus argues that Engels succeeds along with Dickens not because they get their data right or wrong, but because they echo the deepest unconscious contradictions of men.

The academic reaction to Marcus's work on Engels generally faulted his biographical Freudian approach to material and historical processes. Myrna Chase judged that Marcus's "psychological analysis of Engels must be judged more humorous than profound". Echoing Chase, John Lucas argues that Marcus's "psychoanalytic speculations" are entirely unhelpful and in some cases "plain silly", noting that whether Engels saw Thomas Carlyle as a father-figure is "not of the slightest importance". Lucas adds that Marcus's failure to take Elizabeth Gaskell's novels seriously prevents Marcus from seeing the limitations of Engels's perception of the working class. By using the worst examples of filth and poverty as archetypal, Marcus colludes with Engels in erasing the gradations of the working class and their efforts at cultural production. Alfred Jenkin wondered whether the frequent errors of fact about Manchester implied that Marcus had never set foot in the city. E. V. Walter faulted Marcus's wandering and elliptical style of analysis, characterizing his work as "excruciatingly mannered" and "inconclusive". Nevertheless, The Times praised it as a "brilliant, if sometimes bejargoned, new book" that would reinvigorate interest in the work of Friedrich Engels.

=== Representations ===
Representations collects a broad range of reviews and essays written between 1956 and 1974, organized around what Marcus terms "the imagination of society". Marcus uses this phrase to collapse the distinction between material actuality and formal representation: "The structures of literature refer to this real world, comment upon it, represent it by means of a written language that is part of it, and are hence themselves part of the same world that they refract and reconstitute imaginatively."

Revisiting his interpretation of The Pickwick Papers from his first book, Marcus argues that Dickens's style begins in a mode of "free, wild, inventive doodling" but gathers design and purpose as Pickwick encounters the hard structures of law, property, and money. On representation in George Eliot's fiction, Marcus argues that her narrative histories mimic nineteenth-century abstract systems of explanation while militating against acknowledgment of their artificial constructedness, thereby creating a stable history that seems to rest on nature, rather than linguistic invention. Marcus then takes up Freudian concepts to suggest that Eliot's early fiction is a complex system of psychic defense mechanisms constructed to control three principle subjects: sexual passion, class conflict, and the unintelligibility of the world. He illustrates this process by showing that in Scenes of Clerical Life, Milly Barton suffers from a miscarriage, which Eliot obliquely represents, then dies from experiencing premature labor. Marcus takes this to imply that Milly died of her own sexual satisfaction in her marriage, engendering a profound and compelling mystery as to why a less-than-ordinary man could gratify an extraordinary woman.

Scholarly reviews of Representations praised Marcus's relentless interdisciplinary synthesis of literary, anthropological, and philosophical methods, and commended Marcus's style for its "playfulness, wit, zest, and readability", in contrast to the "high seriousness and arch academicism of most criticism today". A review in The New York Times praised the collection as "strong, deeply felt, and humane", but lamented that Marcus "always seems to doubt himself or to suspect himself of triviality when he allows his mind to run loose from the mind of society".

== Major publications ==
- Dickens: From Pickwick to Dombey (1961)
- Ernest Jones's The Life and Work of Sigmund Freud (1961), (co-editor, with Lionel Trilling)
- The Other Victorians (1966)
- Engels, Manchester and the Working Class (1974)
- Representations: Essays on Literature and Society (1975)
- Doing Good: The limits of benevolence (1978; contributor)
- Freud and the Culture of Psychoanalysis (1984)

Academic offices
Preceded by Jack Greenberg	Dean of Columbia College; 1993–95	Succeeded by Austin E. Quigley
