= Hermanus Noordkerk =

18th century Dutch lawyer and writer

Hermanus Noordkerk (New Latin: Hermanni Noordkerk; 28 January 1702 – 6 November 1771) was a Dutch lawyer and writer.

== Works ==
- Specimen lectionum, seu Disquisitio de Lege Petronia (1731)
- Observationum decas: in quibus varia juris Romani capita exponuntur aut emendantur (1731)

=== De Matrimoniis ===
Hermanni Noordkerk: De Matrimoniis, Ob turpe Facinus, quod Peccatum Sodomiticum vocant, Jure Solvendis, Dissertatio. Amstekedami, Apud Janssonio-Waesbergios. M. D. CC.XXXIII [1733].

Small 8vo.; size of paper 6 1/2 in × 4 1/4 in (170 mm × 110 mm), of letter-press 5 3/4 in × 2 13/16 in (146 mm × 71 mm); pp. 116, with 12 unnumbered pages of title, dedication (to nine gentlemen), and preface; fleuron of a basket of flowers on the title-page.

The work is divided into five chapters, of which the contents are briefly as follows:

1. The author examines, in 13 paragraphs, the ancient laws, and those of the Middle Ages, and concludes that the law can never embrace all cases.
2. Whether the act of sodomy is a sufficient cause for divorce, considered in twelve paragraphs.
3. The ten paragraphs are devoted to the consideration of the effect which might be produced by the commission of sodomy before the solemnisation of marriage.
4. Is the absence or flight of the person suspected of sodomy sufficient cause for divorce? Seven paragraphs.
5. In 1733 the Dutch government had condemned those persons who were accused of sodomy and who had taken to flight. Can such fugitives be legally divorced? Eight paragraphs.

Henry Spencer Ashbee, writing pseudonymously in 1885, gave the following assessment of this work: "The treatise has little or no value at present, but is nevertheless remarkable on account of the references and quotations, a few of which are in Dutch."

== Sources ==
- Ashbee, Henry Spencer (1885). Catena Librorum Tacendorum. London: privately printed. pp. 11–12.
- "Noordkerk (Mr. Hermanus)". Nieuw Nederlandsch Biografisch Woordenboek. Vol. 10. pp. 673–4.
- "Noordkerk (Hermanus)". Bijvoegsel op het Biogtaphisch Woordenboek der Nederlanden. pp. 302–5.
