= Randiana =

Randiana may refer to:

- Randiana, or Excitable Tales, a pornographic novel published by William Lazenby in 1884
- Choenomeles randiana, a species of the genus Choenomeles in the family Rosaceae
- Encyclia randiana, a species of the genus Encyclia
- Hevea randiana, a species of the genus Hevea
