= Sellon =

Sellon is a surname. Notable people with the surname include:

- Charles Sellon (1870–1937), American actor
- Edward Sellon (1818–1866), British writer, translator, and illustrator
- George Sellon (1881–1954), American architect
- Lydia Sellon (1821–1876), British founder of an Anglican women's order
