= The Romance of Lust =

Victorian erotic novel

The Romance of Lust, or Early Experiences is a Victorian erotic novel written anonymously in four volumes during the years 1873–1876 and published by William Lazenby. Henry Spencer Ashbee discusses this novel in one of his bibliographies of erotic literature. In addition the compilers of British Museum General Catalogue of Printed Books list this book.

== Content ==
The novel is told in first person, and the protagonist of the novel is Charlie Roberts. Charlie possesses a large penis, much virility, and a seemingly insatiable sexual appetite. The novel begins with "There were three of us—Mary, Eliza, and myself." Charlie describes his sexual initiation as an adolescent—as he is "approaching fifteen". He catalogs his sexual experiences including incest with his sisters Eliza and Mary, sex with his governesses, and his later sexual exploits with various male and female friends, and acquaintances. Besides incest, the book deals with a variety of sexual activities, including orgies, masturbation, lesbianism, flagellation, fellatio, cunnilingus, gay sex, anal sex, and double penetration. Taboo subjects such as homosexuality, incest, and pedophilia are common themes in the novel.

== Authorship ==
Questions of authorship exist for this novel, and there are two likely candidates, William Simpson Potter, and Edward Sellon. Sellon is the author of other erotic novels and a book on snake worship, whereas Potter wrote and had privately printed two books of letters on the Prince of Wales' visit to India in 1875–1876. From examining the text in Letters from India during H. R. H. the Prince of Wales visit in 1875–6, from William S. Potter to his sister, one could make a stronger case for Potter, as there are similarities in writing style between the book of letters and The Romance of Lust. Ashbee asserts that Potter acted as editor to contributions by a number of aficionados.

== Scholarly study ==
Scholarship on this novel is limited, although it is mentioned in passing in a number of historical works on the literature of the Victorian era. Steven Marcus discusses The Romance of Lust in some detail in his book The Other Victorians: a Study of Sexuality and Pornography in Mid-Nineteenth-Century England (1966), as does John Alfred Atkins in his historical survey, Sex in Literature (1970-1982).

Marcus's study is psychological in nature, relies much on the work of Sigmund Freud, and he invents a word to describe the sexual activities in this novel, "pornotopia", which he describes as being like a place where "all men ... are always and infinitely potent; all women fecundate with lust and flow inexhaustibly with sap or juice or both. Everyone is always ready for everything" (p. 276). Given the libidos of the characters, the comment is apt. Because of the often unrealistic description of sexual activities and positions in The Romance of Lust, Marcus uses the word vector to describe the mechanical sex acts. He also speaks of emotional deprivation in conjunction with the work, because the characters do not interact with one another as real, thinking, and feeling persons would do.

== Publication history ==
The first uncensored modern edition of this work was published in 1968 by Grove Press. Since then it has been republished by a number of publishers in the United States and the United Kingdom.

== Works that make substantial comment on or criticism of the novel ==
- Henry Spencer Ashbee (as Pisanus Fraxi), "Catena librorum tacendorum", 1885
- Atkins, John Alfred. Sex in Literature. London: Calder & Boyars, (1970–1982)
- Marcus, Steven. The Other Victorians: A Study of Sexuality and Pornography in Mid-Nineteenth-Century England. New York: Basic Books, (1966)
- Lisa Z. Sigel, "International exposure: perspectives on modern European pornography, 1800-2000", Rutgers University Press, 2005, ISBN 0-8135-3519-0, pp. 105–116
