= A Night in a Moorish Harem =

Erotic novella

A Night in a Moorish Harem is an erotic novella published in 1896 under the pseudonym "Lord George Herbert". It is written in the first person in the persona of a shipwrecked British sailor, recounting the night he spent in a Moroccan harem with nine concubines of different nationalities. The literary topos of the harem has been classified by some as a typical example of Western literary orientalism.

In December 1923, two New York booksellers, Maurice Inman and Max Gottschalk, were arrested for selling A Night in a Moorish Harem and convicted in March 1924. However, by 1930, a prosecution in Chicago for selling the book failed, as did another in New York in 1931.

== See also ==
- The Lustful Turk
