= Auguste Brancart =

Belgian publisher of pornographic literature

August or Auguste Brancart (21 July 1851 – 1894?) was a Belgian publisher of pornographic literature, credited with the first publication of My Secret Life. He published translations of English pornography into French and vice versa for English publishers such as Edward Avery. He also published work of the Decadent movement such as Monsieur Vénus by Rachilde.

He was already under investigation by the police in 1885, 1886 and 1888 and moved to Antwerp in 1894: in 1895 another police dossier was compiled.
