= The Boudoir =

British erotic magazine (1883–1884)

The Boudoir: A Magazine of Scandal, Facetiae etc. was an erotic magazine published in London in the 1880s by William Lazenby. It was a continuation of The Pearl and existed between 1883 and 1884.

== Reprints ==
- The Boudoir: A Victorian Magazine of Scandal, etc., Grove Press, New York, 1971
