= The Oyster =

Erotic magazine published in London in 1883

The Oyster was an erotic magazine published in London from 1883 by William Lazenby. It was a continuation of The Pearl. Unlike its predecessor, the emphasis was mainly on heterosexual pornography. It may have ceased publication in 1896.

Graham Grafton wrote in the preface to an anthology of writing from the magazine, "Since the rediscovery of The Oyster in the mid 1980s, there has been much speculation as to just who were the authors of this infamous Victorian underground magazine". He says that previous researchers have suggested a pulp-fiction writer, Gerald Burdett, as one of the contributors. Grafton adds a doctor, Edward Parsifal, as a possibility. Grafton describes the magazine as "a journal that flourished throughout the 1880s, only to disappear without trace during the next decade".
