= The Cremorne =

British pornographic magazine

- Categories: Pornographic magazine
- First issue: 1882
- Final issue: 1882
- Company: William Lazenby
- Country: United Kingdom
- Language: English

The Cremorne was a pornographic magazine published by William Lazenby in London in 1882 (but falsely backdated to 1851). The title alludes to Cremorne Gardens which had by that time become a haunt of prostitutes. The magazine was a sequel to The Pearl. The Cremorne folded in 1882.

The story "The Secret Life of Linda Brent" is an obscene parody of "Incidents in the Life of a Slave Girl", by Harriet Jacobs writing under the pseudonym of Linda Brent. It is in the same vein as "My Grandmother's Tale", previously published in The Pearl.
