= Gisèle d'Estoc =

French sculptor

- Born: Marie-Paule Alice Courbe; 27 March 1845; Nancy, France
- Died: 8 May 1894 (aged 49); Nice, France
- Occupations: writer; sculptor; feminist
- Spouse: Mr. Parent-Desbarres (See Notes (a))
- Writing career
- Pen name: "Gisèle d'Estoc" (pseudonym); "Mme Paule Parent-Desbarres" (possible pseudonym); "G. d'Estoc" (pen name); "Gyz-El" (pen name)
- Language: French

Gisèle d'Estoc, pseudonym of Marie-Paule Alice Courbe (27 March 1845 – 8 May 1894), was a French writer, sculptor, and feminist. She was also a duellist and cross dresser. Madame Paule Parent Des Barres was either her married name or another pseudonym, (Note: There is no evidence that a marriage occurred.) while her pen names included, Gyz-El and G. d'Estoc.

== Biography ==
Gisèle d'Estoc was born as Marie-Paule Alice Courbe on 27 March 1845, in Nancy. She studied sculpture with Delorme and Chapu, exhibiting her works at the Salon, the official art exhibition of the Académie des Beaux-Arts in Paris, until 1899. She exhibited Un peintre, a bas-relief in plaster in the sculpture section at the Palais des Champs-Elysées on May 2, 1881, her entry in the event catalogue referring to her as "PARENT DES BARRES (Mme Paule-Marie-Alice, née COURBE)". The following year, at the same event, she exhibited Tête d'Étude, a bust in dyed plaster, the catalogue referring to her by the same name as the year before. During this time, she began a very strong, friendly relationship with Marie-Edmée Pau, also an artist, in which the two young women developed their affinity for Joan of Arc by exploring gender identities, according to Melanie C. Hawthorne.

At the end of the Second French Empire, continuing to refer to herself as "Mme Paule Parent-Desbarres", she moved to Paris and began a literary career, her favorite themes being social justice and feminism. She maintained women should be accountable for their actions, notably criticizing the journalist Séverine in 1890 for having sent her husband to fight a duel for her. She concluded her diatribe with "à capacités égales salaire égal" (equal skills, equal pay).

Estoc was bisexual. After 1862, she began a romantic relationship with Guy de Maupassant, who remained close to Estoc until her death, then with Rachilde, a writer and cross-dresser like herself, whom Estoc later criticized in a leaflet. She also had a difficult affair with a rider from the Cirque Medrano, Emma Rouër, whom Estoc eventually beat in a duel, injuring her left breast. Her last companion was Léo d'Arkaï (alias, Louis-Joseph Pillard). It was with him that Estoc moved to Nice two years before her death in order to take advantage of the Mediterranean climate.

Using the name "G. d'Estoc", she joined the "Ligue de l'affranchissement des femmes" (League for the emancipation of women), just founded by Marie-Rose Astié de Valsayre in 1889. Estoc also joined the Group of Fencers, again under the influence of Astié, who believed in the need for a group of women to take up the sword to defend their causes. A year before her death, Estoc was a candidate for the 1893 legislative elections. She died 8 May 1894, in Nice, of leprosy, at the age of 49.

== Legacy ==
After Estoc's death, her life was examined by Pierre Borel, a biographer, who created an unflattering image of her, describing her as a "fin de siècle ghoul". Madeleine Pelletier (1874–1939) admired in Estoc a "way of luminous emancipation" through the practice of fencing and cross-dressing. Mélanie C. Hawthorne wrote a biography of Estoc in 2013.

== Selected works ==
=== Sculptures ===
- Mme Paule-Marie-Alice PARENT DES BARRES, Un peintre, 1881
- Mme Paule-Marie-Alice PARENT DES BARRES, Tête d'Étude, 1882

=== Publications ===
- G. d'Estoc, Comme quoi les Jésuites pourraient bien ne pas descendre du singe - avis à Darwin, 1880
- G. d'Estoc, La Vierge réclame, "Les Gloires malsaines", 1887
- Gyz-El, Noir sur blanc, récits lorrains, 1887
- G. d'Estoc, "Cahier d'amour" (1893), Guy de Maupassant - Poèmes érotiques, 1993
