= Rachilde =

French Decadent writer (1860–1953)

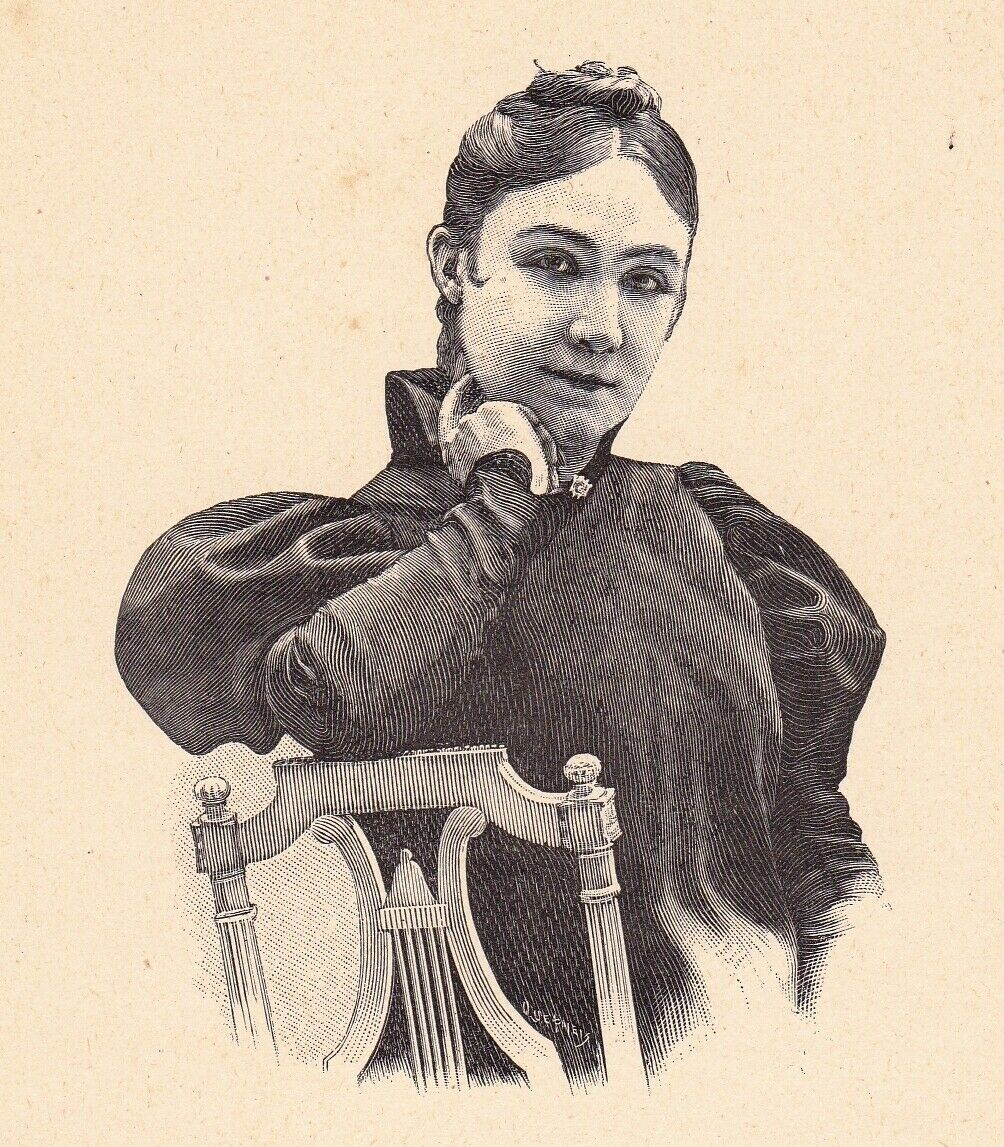
- Born: Marguerite Eymery; 11 February 1860; Château-l'Évêque, France
- Died: 4 April 1953 (aged 93); Paris, France
- Occupations: novelist and playwright
- Spouse: Alfred Vallette (m. 1889; died 1935)
- Writing career
- Pen name: Rachilde; Jean de Chilra
- Notable work: Monsieur Vénus
- Movements: Symbolist; Decadent

Rachilde (French pronunciation: [ʁaʃild]) was the pen name and preferred identity of novelist and playwright Marguerite Vallette-Eymery (11 February 1860 – 4 April 1953). Born near Périgueux, Dordogne, Aquitaine, France during the Second French Empire, Rachilde went on to become a Symbolist author and one of the most prominent women in literature associated with the Decadent movement of fin de siècle France.

A diverse and challenging author, Rachilde's most famous work includes the darkly erotic novels Monsieur Vénus (1884), La Marquise de Sade (1887), and La Jongleuse (1900). She also wrote a 1928 monograph on gender identity, Pourquoi je ne suis pas féministe ("Why I am not a Feminist"). Her work was noted for being frank, fantastical, and always with a suggestion of autobiography underlying questions of gender, sexuality, and identity.

She said of herself, "I always acted as an individual, not thinking to found a society or to upset the present one."

== Biography ==
=== Early life ===
Marguerite Eymery was born in February 1860 to Joseph and Gabrielle (Feytaud) Eymery. Marguerite was born with one leg shorter than the other, giving her a lifelong limp that set her apart from others from the very start. She grew up on the estate of le Cros as an only child. She was unwanted by her parents and received less affection from them than did the family's pet monkey, who was even granted such social graces as a seat at the table. She received some affection from her maternal grandmother, but Gabrielle taught the child to dismiss her grandmother as frivolous and simple. Nevertheless, it was her grandmother and her grandfather who encouraged Marguerite's imagination through play and reading, and offered her glimpses of fantastical escape.

Joseph Eymery was a soldier, and that had a distinct impact on his wife and daughter, through various absences and stresses. At the extreme end, Joseph was imprisoned for dueling for four months in 1867 and then was imprisoned as an enemy soldier by the Prussians from 1870 to 1871 after surrendering his unit to them. During this separation, at least in Marguerite's mind, the distance between uninterested wife and unfaithful husband became wider and more permanent. Both offered her abuse, but her father's abuse had a perverse hope at the end of it.

At twelve, Marguerite began writing anonymous pieces in the local newspaper. She then asked her father to read to her, an indication of her split relationship with herself that would be the hallmark of her life. Even at a young age, some of what she wrote was inappropriately decadent. She began to write on a commission at fifteen, taking on the name Rachilde for the first time and creating a new persona for herself.

As a bold young woman with a passion for writing, she wrote to idol Victor Hugo and received encouraging words in reply. This fueled in her a desire to move to Paris and become part of the literary culture there. Her father did not understand that, and it appears that in the mid-1870s he tried to set up an engagement for her as an alternative to literary pursuits. She rejected that engagement. Perhaps linked to this, she later claimed to have attempted suicide around this time.

=== Adult life in Paris ===
Between 1878 and 1881, Marguerite moved to Paris with money that her father had raised by selling his prize hounds. She shed "Marguerite" and asserted "Rachilde" in every way she could. Free to explore her own identity and challenge both herself and the world, she cut her hair short, went out publicly in men's clothing, and intentionally shocked the society around her with suggestions of gender ambiguity. Her cousin Marie de Saverny had introduced her to famous actress Sarah Bernhardt, who was known for her libertine interests and her own willingness to create her own identity. Bernhardt used her connections to help make sure that Rachilde's career could get off to a good start.

Rachilde began to hold a salon in her apartment each Tuesday and it quickly became gathering place for young nonconformist writers and their allies, placing her at the center of activity for the Symbolist and Decadent movements.

In 1884 she published her first successful novel, Monsieur Vénus. It was so scandalous that she was tried for pornography and convicted in absentia in Belgium, where the initial editions had been published. She was sentenced to two years of prison, essentially ensuring that she remain in France after that.

She met Alfred Vallette in 1885 and they married in 1889, despite his disapproval of her writing and her sometimes shocking public behavior. With their marriage, she regrew her hair and adopted a more subdued presentation of herself. A few months after their civil ceremony wedding, their only child was born. Rachilde named their daughter Gabrielle after her own estranged mother. By most accounts, she disliked motherhood and prioritized writing and supporting other writers over her daughter.

In 1890, Vallette launched the avant-garde magazine Mercure de France, "the most influential avant-garde journal of arts and literature of the era".^{:95} Rachilde served as the journal's literary critic, and as a "creative advisor to her husband".^{:95} There, she not only got to write her own material, but helped select and refine the work of others and to express her opinions in a way that would help define literature for fin de siècle France. Rachilde began to hold her Tuesday salon in the Mercure offices. She took great pride in the luminaries who attended, a group which included not only the established inner circle of Symbolist writers, but other notable countercultural figures such as Alfred Jarry, Oscar Wilde, painters Toulouse-Lautrec and Gauguin, composer Maurice Ravel, and many others.

Beyond poetry and prose, one stated goal of Mercure de France was to encourage the development of Symbolist theater. Rachilde was especially involved in working with Paul Fort and his Théâtre d'Art. That theater would be home for her dramas La Voix du sang (1890) and Madame la Mort (1891). Continuing her desire to support Symbolist theater, but also feeling inspired to encourage the production of plays by French authors, she became involved in supporting Théâtre de l'Œuvre. Her own drama The Crystal Spider (1894) would eventually be produced there, establishing a refined model for Symbolist theater.

Throughout her life, Rachilde's most infamous friendships were often tortured by the inability of her (generally male) friends to decide whether they admired her, lusted for her, or pitied her, as publicly exemplified by Maurice Barrès in his preface to a later edition of Monsieur Vénus. Good friend Jean Lorrain referred to her and his other female friends as high-strung, sex-addicted pervert, to which she said that he and her other male friends were also neurotic, just in a more balanced way. Even so, she often went out of her way for them, as when using her connections to arrange hospital care for Paul Verlaine.

It is less discussed, but Rachilde developed important relationships with women as well. Despite having poked fun at bas-bleu women in her preface to À Mort! (1886), she formed a complex relationship with writers Camille Delaville and Georges de Peyrebrune. These women were friends and supporters but also critics, often with a frank yet maternal tone. Rachilde also befriended Léonide Leblanc and publicly supported the one-time courtesan's efforts to enter legitimate theater. She was an early friend and supporter of fellow writer Colette and American expatriate Natalie Clifford Barney.

Rachilde remained socially active for much of her life, appearing around town with young men even into her sixties and seventies. There were naturally rumors of licentious adultery, but she had always preferred the company of gay men and men like Maurice Barrès, for whom there was pleasure in the torture of restraint. In 1935, however, when Rachilde was 75 years old, her husband Alfred Vallette died at his desk. Her truly bohemian phase had ended with her marriage to Vallette. Her active social presence ended with his death. After more than fifty years, her Tuesday salons came to an end.

In her Parisian apartment adjoining the Mercure de France, on Saturday, 4 April 1953, Rachilde died at the age of ninety-three.

=== Gender and sexuality ===
Although Rachilde was married to a man, her experience was not typical of a woman of her day. She distrusted women and envied the privilege of men. She referred to women as the inferior brothers of men. Rachilde was known to dress in men's clothes, even though doing so was in direct violation of French law. Her reasons are not entirely clear, as there is both boldness and polite reserve in a request she filed for a permit to do so:

Dear Sir, please authorize me to wear men's clothing. Please read the following attestation, I beg you and do not confuse my inquiry with other classless women who seek scandal under the above costume.

She did refer to herself as androgynous, but her definition was functional and pragmatic. There was such a thing as a man of letters, not a woman of letters. Hence, she was both a woman and man. Nor was she shy about that, identifying herself on her cards as "Rachilde, homme de lettres", a man of letters. Her views on gender were strongly influenced by her distrust of her mother and her envy of the privileged freedom she saw in men like her philandering father.

I never trusted women since I was first deceived by the eternal feminine under the maternal mask and I don't trust myself anymore. I always regretted not being a man, not so much because I value the other half of mankind but because, since I was forced by duty or by taste to live like a man, to carry alone the heavy burden of life during my childhood, it would have been preferable to have had at least the privileges if not the appearances.

Apart from her marriage and her often flirtatious friendships, Rachilde did engage in love affairs. She had an early affair with a man named Léo d'Orfer, to whom she dedicated Monsieur Vénus. Just prior to writing Monsieur Vénus, she had a fruitless passion for Catulle Mendès. Though she would later deny even a slight attraction to women, Rachilde also had a relationship with the enigmatic Gisèle d'Estoc, a bisexual woman of some notoriety at the time. It was an affair that unfolded in playful secrecy and ended with tremendous drama in 1887.

It is unclear just what her thoughts were about sexual pleasure and sensual attraction. Her friend and admirer Maurice Barrès quotes her as suggesting that God erred in combining love and sensuality, that sensual pleasure is a beast which should be sacrificed: "Dieu aurait dû créer l'amour d'un côté et les sens de l'autre. L'amour véritable ne se devrait composer que d'amitié chaude. Sacrifions les sens, la bête." In her work, while she certainly portrays sexual pleasure, she also portrays sexual desire as something powerful, beyond control, and perhaps frightening.

Her own sexuality and gender may have been conflicted, but she was not confused in her support of others. In the public sphere, she wrote articles in defense of homosexual love, albeit sometimes with mixed results. She counted among her friends openly lesbian writer Natalie Clifford Barney, who found her an enchanting enigma and a tender friend. She was well known at the time for her close friendships with gay men, including such prominent and notorious dandies as Barbey d'Aurevilly, Jean Lorrain, and Oscar Wilde, who brought his lover Lord Alfred Douglas to her salons. She is known to have appeared at events with Lorrain while he was wearing female disguise. She offered shelter and support to tormented poet Paul Verlaine. She may not have been settled with herself, but she did not let it make her unsettled with those she cared about.

== Writing ==
The pseudonym Rachilde gave young Marguerite some initial anonymity and a measure of gender ambiguity, but it was more than that. When her identity was discovered, she explained that Rachilde was the name of a long-dead Swedish lord who had come to her in a séance. This allowed her to shift the blame for her perverse writings to spiritual possession, but that also gave her an internal explanation for why she felt unnatural and unlike the others around her. This idea would be recapitulated later in life with the idea of possession by a werewolf.

In 1878 Rachilde began to be published by Parisian newspapers, and in 1879 she published her first novel. In 1884 she was a scandalous sensation. One little-known serial novel (La Joise d'Ameir) was published in 1885 under the name Jean Yvan, but that was a brief and unsuccessful experiment and she returned to Rachilde. Then, in 1895, at the insistence of her publisher, two of her novels were published under the name Jean de Chilra, an anagram of Rachilde, though typographical errors plagued its few printings. This imperfect pseudonym had its own personality, that of a young male anarchist, and was treated as separate person. Unafraid to interact with an artificial identity, Rachilde herself wrote a lengthy and personal review of the de Chilra novel L'Heure sexuelle. Neither novel was a publishing success, and by 1899 she was publishing exclusively as Rachilde once again.

Stylistically, Rachilde occupies an interesting place in French literature, most closely associated with the Decadent movement but also linked to French Symbolism. She was published in the pages of La Décadence, which was formed as a Symbolist-leaning rival to Anatole Baju's Le Décadent, but then she was also published in Le Décadent. In fact, despite the Symbolist qualities of much of her work and her close association with that group, Rachilde actively opposed an attempt by the Symbolists to take over the more explicitly Decadent publication. Maurice Barrès certainly put her in the company of the early Decadents when he described as writing as a dreamlike extension of life, intending primarily to titillate but also to explore la maladie du siècle, the ennui and disillusion of the age, which in women was known at the time to result in hysteria.

Her writing embraced or at least explored many different forms of sexuality at odds with the morals and expectations of her society, often shocking for their depravity rather than any explicit descriptions: prostitution, cross-dressing, gender ambiguity, homosexuality, sadism, incest, bestiality, Pygmalionism, necrophilia, and more. According to Rachilde herself, the real vice she exposed was not those activities but Love.

Obsession is common thread throughout her œuvre, but Rachilde also dealt with characters whose entire lives are formed or constrained by other overpowering psychological conditions such as delirium or terror. Often those conditions were tied into sexuality or gender conflicts.

The core dynamic of Rachilde's fiction is frequently gender reversal. Either at the outset or as an outcome of the story line there is a biologically female character who seems more culturally masculine and a biologically male character who seems more culturally feminine. There is variation in degree and manifestation, but it is important time and time again.

Later in life, as she became less prolific, her writing took on a much more reflective and autobiographical quality. This trend began around the time of World War I and became especially notable after the 1935 death of her husband Alfred Vallette.

=== Novels ===
Rachilde's 1884 novel Monsieur Vénus is usually regarded as her breakthrough work. In it, she uses a fantastical erotic plot to reverse gender roles, explore the nature of sexual desire, and question the nature of interpersonal power. She makes clear a preference for the ideal and suggests that even in erotic matters there can be power in artifice and illusion. In his preface to the 1889 edition, Maurice Barrès referred to this novel as depraved, perverse, and nasty. He called it a "sensual and mystical frenzy", and the shocking and mysterious "dream of a virgin".

Her novels continued to explore gender identity and the power structure of relationships through sexual experimentation in a shocking and extreme way that was typical of the Decadent movement. The Juggler (1900) is often considered to be the most complete and refined Rachilde novel to deal with these themes. In it she uses eroticism and violent imagery to both subvert traditional sex roles and at the same time to satirize the "new woman", the feminist ideal of her day.

The two novels published as Jean de Chilra provide an interesting interlude, different in some key ways from the Rachilde-credited novels, despite sharing the themes of aggressive sexual deviance, obsession, and confusion between reality and illusion. The main character of La Princesse des ténèbres (1895) is a weak and victimized woman. The main character of L'Heure sexuelle (1898) is a man who may be conflicted, but is not typically effeminate. Both novels are also more introspective than the others published up to this point, invoking sexual guilt and raising questions about the relationship between sex and abusive violence.

Rachilde's final novel was Duvet d'Ange (1943), an autobiographical roman à clef dealing with mother–daughter relationship, inherited sin, and the Catholic Church's turning sin into something evil. In this story she makes use of the werewolf origin myth she had adopted for herself, especially in terms of family curses.

=== Drama ===
Rachilde was the only woman at the time to play a prominent role in avant-garde theater of any sort. Through her support, involvement and reviews at Mercure de France, she helped bring Théâtre de l'Œuvre and Théâtre d'Art to prominence. She herself wrote and directed Symbolist plays, stretching the ability of the theater and of audiences to accommodate rich and complex supernatural symbols.

Rachilde's first prominent experiment was with Madame la Mort (1891), in which the entire second act takes place as a subjective and dreamlike experience inside the protagonist's mind. In that act she incarnates both death and life as women competing for the same suicidal man, as he sorts through whether he should embrace death or allow himself to be charmed by life. Life is a tempting young woman named Lucie, and ultimately Lady Death scolds her as a "slut", on grounds of Lucie's thoughts of procreation, i.e., sex as a reproductive act sanctioned by the Catholic Church.

The next year, Rachilde's 1892 one-act drama L'Araignée de cristal (English: The Crystal Spider) refined the Symbolist drama, exploring gender roles, power structures, simmering sexuality, self-identify, and the nature of reality through a dialogue of fear and confusion. The central image is that of a mirror. A mirror is a double trap. It shows you other realities, where your desires are more powerful than you are, and it also calls into question which side of the mirror is real and which is illusion, which of you is the free person and which is the trapped reflection.

=== Poetry and short fiction ===
Rachilde wrote short stories that were published in Mercure de France and other literary reviews. She released collections of the stories along with other material, including Le Démon de l'absurde (1894), Contes et Nouvelles (1900), and The Theater of Animals (1926). One such story, originally written for Mercure de France in 1892, is "La Dent", a dark and disturbing tale about the two sides of sensual experience, the nature of womanhood, and identity horror, all centering around a lost tooth. In typical Rachilde fashion, the main character begins to experience a sexualized obsession and drowns in a mixture of memory, fantasy, and fact.

She also published two poorly received volumes of poetry: Les Accords perdus (1937 – "Lost Deals") and Survie (1945 – "Survival").

=== Non-fiction ===
Rachilde wrote countless reviews and essays for the various magazines and newspapers that thrived in Paris during this time. These are, strictly speaking, non-fiction, but their purpose was really to manage the fictional world that the writers were creating. She wanted to amplify the work of those she admired or supported, and she knew well how much of a role just being talked about could play. In typical Rachilde recursive behavior, non-fiction was a vehicle for fiction.

After World War I, Rachilde wrote a variety of biographical portraits of various writers. This included her friend Alfred Jarry, whose career she actively supported throughout his life.^{:96} In her biography of Jarry she established the myth of the infamous opening night right of his play Ubu Roi at the Théâtre de l'Œuvre.^{:96}

In 1928 she published her brief monograph Pourquoi je ne suis pas féministe ("Why I Am Not a Feminist"). In this book she discloses an upbringing in which her mother Gabrielle (Feyaud) Eymery assertively devalued her father, remained cold and distant, and insulted young Marguerite at every opportunity. At the same time her father Joseph Eymery was abusive and liberated to pursue his own sexual pleasures outside of marriage, something Gabrielle made clear was not appropriate for a proper lady. She also relayed the story of her mother's ancestral sins and the curse that was placed on her family because of them. Her rejection of feminism was for autobiographical reasons and an envy of freedom, founded in a distaste for both men and women. In the end, she preferred animals to both.

During this latter phase of her career, Rachilde also published collections of letters and a variety of memoir volumes, most of which demonstrate flexibility and creativity in their varying presentations of her life story. She wrote the most famous of these amidst the 1942 German occupation of France. In Face à la peur ("Facing Fear") she laid forth a strange origin myth for herself, recalling the family curse she had disclosed in 1928. In this version of her life story, she rose about the limits of society, her confused friendship with misogynists, and even her parents' wish that she had been a boy. She was outside of all these things, because she was none of them. Bearing the family curse, she described herself as a werewolf. She embraced the animal side as preferable to being the human product of her parents, perhaps also recalling the status of another animal, the pet monkey who usurped her place in the family affections.

Her last publication was another memoir in 1947: Quand j'étais jeune ("When I was Young"). It is the final version of the life story she wants us to understand her by. Many of the threads from earlier memoir continue. It is not generally considered credible for dates and ages. It is also where she clearly recounts a dreamlike memory that even she doesn't trust, of meeting an illegitimate half-brother and staring at him, realizing how much alike they look, and feeling as if he were really a male reflection of herself.

== Influence and legacy ==
The most important impact that Rachilde had was upon the literary world in which she lived. Monsieur Vénus caused great scandal, but in general her works were not widely read by the general public and were almost forgotten. There has been a resurgence of interest in her after the 1977 reissue of Monsieur Vénus, but even that is often relegated to literary scholars with an interest in feminist or LGBTQ topics.

During her lifetime and within her world, however, Rachilde made a definite impression. In an 1886 review, Maurice Barrès famously referred to her as "Mademoiselle Baudelaire", and explicitly situated her work in the direct lineage of Charles Baudelaire's Les Fleurs du mal and Charles Augustin Sainte-Beuve's Joseph Delorme. In his preface to the 1889 Monsieur Vénus, he lavished her with praise for both her writing and her personal life, and compared her again to Charles Baudelaire and also to the Marquis de Custine for the quality of her writing and for her veiled approach to exploring the complications of love in her time.

Some of her friends and fellow writers appreciated her mainly for her extremes of bold decadence. Jean Lorrain praised L'Animale (1893) purely for its grand depravity. Jules Barbey d'Aurevilly is said to have declared, "A pornographer, yes, she is, but such a distinguished one!" (This might have been in response to Monsieur Vénus, a defense of her in polite company, or a remark upon first meeting her.) Paul Verlaine congratulated her on the creativity of her perversion: "Ah! My dear child, if you've invented an extra vice, you'll be a benefactor of humanity!"

She also had a noteworthy impact on the career and legacy of British decadent Oscar Wilde. She hosted him and his lover at her salon and supported him during his lifetime. More directly than that, Wilde admired Monsieur Vénus and drew inspiration from it. Many scholars believe that Le Secret de Raoul, the novel that has its poisonous effect on Dorian Gray, is named in honor of the main character of Monsieur Vénus, Raoule de Vénérande. Rachilde also translated and wrote about many of his works after his death, helping pave the way for his long-lasting legacy in France.

In many ways, her most direct impact on many of these contemporaries was not through her creative writing, nor for her Decadent character which they admired. It was through her reviews, boosting their careers; her salons, encouraging the exchange of ideas; and her friends, offered to them at difficult times.

According to those who knew her, Rachilde was enticing and inscrutable, passionate and angry. She was unafraid to speak openly with the sincerity of her feelings. She had no shame in marketing herself, but was also known as a tender and caring friend. Intimate in friendship and dedicated to supporting the careers of others, Rachilde was nevertheless always an outsider, forced to explain her thoughts and beliefs in terms of possession, because what was natural to her seemed to be so unnatural to everyone around her, including to herself as she tried to sort out what was in her and what was in the reflection.

== Bibliography ==
Some notable works by Rachilde:

- 1879 Monsieur de la Nouveauté
- 1884 Monsieur Vénus (Brussels: Auguste Brancart, 1884 in two "first" editions; Paris: Flammarion, 1977)
- 1885 Queue de poisson (Brussels: Auguste Brancart, 1885)
- 1885 Nono (Paris: Mercure de France, 1997)
- 1886 À Mort!
- 1886 Candaulette (serialized in Le Décadent)
- 1887 La Marquise de Sade (Paris: Mercure de France, 1981)
- 1890 La Voix du sang
- 1891 Madame la Mort
- 1892 L'Araignée de cristal
- 1893 L'animale (Paris: Mercure de France, 1993)
- 1894 Le Démon de l'absurde
- 1895 La Princesse des ténèbres (as Monsieur Jean de Chilra)
- 1897 Les hors nature
- 1898 L'Heure sexuelle (as Monsieur Jean de Chilra)
- 1899 La tour d'amour (Paris: Mercure de France, 1994)
- 1900 La Jongleuse (Paris: Des femmes, 1982)
- 1934 Mon étrange plaisir (Paris: Éditions Joëlle Losfeld, 1993)
- 1942 Face à la peur
- 1943 Duvet d'Ange
- 1947 Quand j'étais jeune
