= The Victim of Lust =

Victorian pornographic novel published by William Dugdale

The Victim of Lust, or Scenes in the Life of Rosa Fielding is an anonymously written Victorian pornographic novel published by William Dugdale in 1867.

In the third volume of his bibliographic trilogy on erotic books, Catena Librorum Tacendorum, after giving a one-page summary of the novel, Henry Spencer Ashbee concludes that "The book is very obscene, and possesses no literary merit whatever." Gordon Grimley, in Wicked Victorians: an anthology of clandestine literature of the nineteenth century, called Dugdale "the most notorious of publisher/booksellers of pornography of his time." An excerpt is contained in the anthology Erotic tales of the Victorian Age.

According to Alfred Rose's Register of erotic books, the book is 135 pages long, illustrated, with coloured engravings.
