= The New Epicurean =

1865 Victorian erotic novel by William Dugdale

The New Epicurean: The Delights of Sex, Facetiously and Philosophically Considered, in Graphic Letters Addressed to Young Ladies of Quality is a Victorian erotic novel published by William Dugdale in 1865 and attributed to Edward Sellon. The novel is falsely dated "1740", and is written as an eighteenth-century pastiche, composed of a series of letters addressed to various young ladies.

The story concerns an English gentleman, named Sir Charles, and his wife Lady Celia, who procure very young girls to their suburban villa, in order to indulge in sex with them. He essentially grooms underage girls into sex. He shows the girls the mating of horses, to introduce them to the act. He procures the girls from a local orphanage and some whose parents can't pay for their daughters upkeep. Charles pays to deflower the girls, the money goes to the owner of the orphanage.

The house is luxuriously furnished and is situated in extensive grounds with an inner secret garden surrounded by high walls to prevent onlookers observing what takes place there.

The Victorian pornographic bibliographer Henry Spencer Ashbee comments that: "The scenes depicted, many of which are doubtless from the author's own experience, and may be to a certain extent autobiographical, are remarkable for an ultra-lasciviousness, and a cynicism worthy of the Marquis de Sade".
