= Edith Cadivec =

Austrian author

Edith Cadivec (27 November 1879 in Sveti Martin, Buzet, Croatia – 1952) was an Austrian teacher, erotic novelist and notorious sex criminal of Slovenian descent.

== Conviction ==
Cadivec was arrested, tried, and convicted in 1924 on the charge of sexually abusing eight underage girls under her care, including her own daughter. After a three-day trial, in the Viennese Court, she was sentenced to six years in jail but was set free in December 1925 after showing signs of mental instability.

When arrested, she was found in possession of a large collection of birches, whips, canes, and erotic pictures. One of the whips had a silver knob with the engraving, Dominatrix. Also revealed were compromising letters to a painter in Innsbruck which enlarged on her interests in erotic sadism. The testimony of the trial indicates that Cadivec not only flogged the children under her care, but also indulged in sex acts with them and invited paying guests to watch.

== Books ==
She wrote two books on her experiences, entitled Confessions and Experiences and Eros, the Meaning of My Life (published together 1930–1). Both books sold well and were translated into many languages. In them, the author portrays herself as unable to control the sexual thrill she obtained, when flogging the minors under her charge in the name of discipline, and being a victim of her own lust—though outside observers have been less charitable about her motives.

== Bibliography ==
- Edith Cadivec (1971) Confessions and Experiences. Grove Press.
- Edith Cadivec (1998) Eros, the Meaning of My Life. Blue Moon Books.
