= Alfred Vallette =

French man of letters

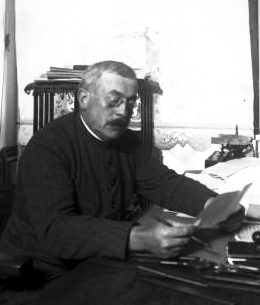
Alfred Vallette in 1909

Alfred Vallette (1858, Paris – 1935) was a French man of letters.

With his wife Rachilde, he founded and edited the Mercure de France, a Symbolist review, founded in 1890. In 1892, they expanded the review into a book publisher.

== Publications ==
- À l'écart, avec Raoul Minhar, Paris, Perrin, 1891; réédition chez Honoré Champion, 2004.
- La Vie grise. Le Vierge, Paris, Tresse et Stock, 1891 — Read online.
- Le Roman d'un homme sérieux : Alfred Vallette à Rachilde, 1885-1889, Mercure de France, Paris, 1943. Réédition (preface Édith Silve), Mercure de France, 1994.
- Lettres à A.-Ferdinand Herold, 1891-1935, et quelques-unes à son épouse, avant-propos et notes par Claire Lesage, Philippe Oriol, Christian Soulignac, Paris, Éditions du Fourneau, 1992.
- In perpetuum, roman inédit, Paris, Éditions du Fourneau, 1992.
