= William Lazenby =

British publisher

William Lazenby (died c. 1888) was an English publisher of pornography active in the 1870s and 1880s. He used the aliases Duncan Cameron and Thomas Judd. His notable publications include magazines The Pearl, which published poems thought to have been written by Algernon Charles Swinburne, The Oyster, The Boudoir and The Cremorne He also published such books as The Romance of Lust, Randiana, or Excitable Tales, The Birchen Bouquet (1881), The Romance of Chastisement (1883), The Pleasures of Cruelty (1886) and The Sins of the Cities of the Plain. He was an associate of Edward Avery and Leonard Smithers. He was prosecuted in 1871 and again in 1881.

After the Post Office (Protection) Act 1884, Lazenby together with other publishers such as Edward Avery, Charles Carrington, and Harry Sidney Nichols, moved much of their business to Paris to sell in the United Kingdom by mail order.
