= Randiana, or Excitable Tales =

1884 pornographic novel

Randiana, or Excitable Tales is an anonymously written pornographic novel originally published by William Lazenby in 1884. The book depicts a variety of sexual activities, including incest, defloration and lesbianism.
