= Charles Lavy =

German industrialist and politician

Christopher Hughes Edward Charles Lavy (16 August 1842 in Hamburg – 10 May 1928) was a German industrialist and politician, best remembered as proprietor of Charles Lavy & Company. He served as member of the Hamburg Parliament from 1882 to 1910.
