= The Pearl (magazine) =

Pornographic monthly magazine issued in London during the mid-Victorian period

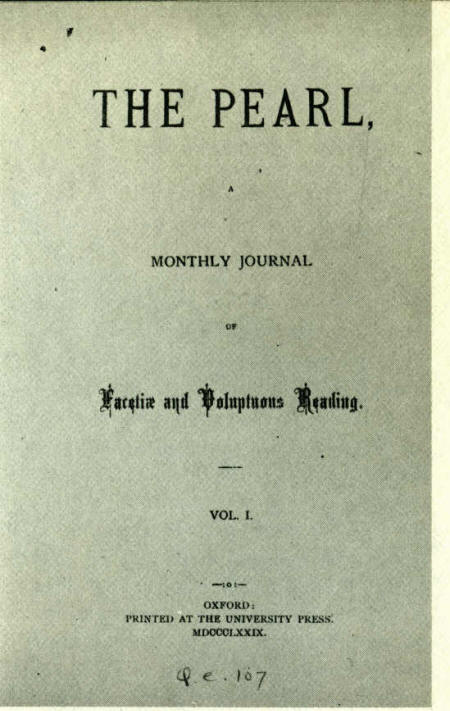

The Pearl: A Magazine of Facetiae and Voluptuous Reading was a pornographic monthly magazine issued in London during the mid-Victorian period by William Lazenby. It was closed down by the British authorities for violating contemporary standards of obscenity.

== Publication ==
The Pearl ran for eighteen issues from July 1879 to December 1880, with two Christmas supplements. As an underground publication, it was limited to 150 copies and cost twenty-five pounds, which made it unusually expensive relative to comparable contemporaneous pornographic periodicals. The Christmas Annual, a crudely produced supplement that ran sixty pages, sold for three guineas. Only the special numbers contained illustrations. The publisher and editor, William Lazenby, also wrote some of the content. The magazine was distributed discreetly through mail order. Based on the cost and subject matter, the target audience appears to have been middle- and upper-class professionals. Two of the flagellant poems were composed by Algernon Charles Swinburne, though it is unclear whether he authorized their publication. The format of the magazine, in combining a mix of short stories, serial fiction, current events, and letters to the editor, parodied contemporary family magazines such as Englishwoman's Domestic Magazine, which itself contained depictions of corporal punishment. Parts of the magazine were later compiled and translated into German.

After the magazine was shut down, Lazenby would go on to publish three subsequent pornographic magazines, The Cremorne (1882), The Oyster (1883), and The Boudoir (1883). The popularity of pornographic magazines like The Pearl was part of a trend that began in the 1860s of capitalizing on the profitability of writing about sex, which served to proliferate discourses about sexuality by the time of the fin de siècle in England.

== Contents ==
The general format of the periodical was to publish three serial erotic tales simultaneously, devoted to sex in high society, incest, and flagellation, respectively. The novels, six in total, were interspersed with limericks, hymns, odes, songs, facetious nursery rhymes, acrostic poems, parodies, faux advertisements, and fabricated letters to the editor. The topics depicted in the novels and poems were wide-ranging, including women's suffrage, physical disability, sexual impairment, secret sex societies, bestiality, India-rubber dildos, slave rape, duels, mock crucifixions, Turkish harems, and prophylactic devices. The Pearl often contained extensive political commentary, including references to the Reform Bills and Contagious Diseases Acts, and portrayed or alluded to many controversial public figures, including Annie Besant, Charles Spurgeon, Wilfrid Lawson, Newman Hall, Edmund Burke, William Gladstone, and Robert Peel.

The Pearl contains the first obscene tale about slavery in the Americas. The story, entitled My Grandmother's Tale, depicts the brutal sexualized flogging of a black West Indian slave girl by an overseer of ambiguous racial background acting under the authority of a white plantation owner.

The Pearl's serial novel Lady Pokingham, in which a consumptive invalid recounts her sexual adventures from a wheelchair, has been noted for its depiction of transience, bodily decay, and death, which thus provides counter-evidence to the idea advanced by Steven Marcus that Victorian pornography portrays a pornotopia.

== Legal and cultural legacy ==
Swinburne’s flagellant writings from The Pearl have been cited in British legal arguments as evidence against the safety and utility of corporal punishment in schools.

In 2011, a local councillor in Australia was convicted for possession of "child exploitation material" because a digital copy of The Pearl was found on his laptop. Greg Barns, the director of Australian Lawyers Alliance, noted that the conviction would imply criminality for possession of any number of works of art and literature, and media reports pointed out that HarperCollins had republished the magazine in 2009, and was currently available on Amazon. When the Victorian origins of the materials were identified on appeal, the conviction was set aside.

A selection from the story Lady Pokingham is read during a scene in the 2012 film The Master.

The Pearl's characters and locations, being Victoriana, are featured in The League of Extraordinary Gentlemen by Alan Moore. A girls' school seems to be haunted by a ghost (The "Holy Spirit") that is raping and impregnating the students. The headmistress is Rosa Coote, a character from one of The Pearl's serials. The "Holy Spirit" turns out to be Hawley Griffin, the Invisible Man.

== See also ==
- Rosa Coote
- Victorian morality
- Pornotopia

== Bibliography ==
- The Pearl: A Journal of Voluptuous Reading, the Underground Magazine of Victorian England, Grove Press, 1968, ISBN 0394171268
