= Edward Sellon =

English author of erotic literature (1818–1866)

- Born: 6 January 1818; Brighton, England
- Died: April 1866 (aged 48); Webb's Hotel, Piccadilly, England
- Known for: Author of erotic literature
- Notable work: The Romance of Lust
- Spouse: Sarah Ann Wilds
- Children: 4

Edward Sellon (1818–1866) was an English writer, translator, and illustrator of erotic literature.

== Family ==
Edward Sellon was born 6 January 1818 in Brighton, England (bap. 9 July 1818 in Paddington, England), the only child of Edward Sellon (1791–1822) and Laura Willats (b. 1794).

Edward, Sr. was the son of William Marmaduke Sellon (1757–1824), a brewer and proprietor of several public-houses (pubs), and Henrietta Say (1761–1844). Laura was the daughter of Thomas Willats (1762–1852) and Laura Elizabeth Littlehales (1760–1825). After her husband's death, Laura married John Booty on 14 October 1828.

Edward, Jr. married Sarah Ann Wilds (c. 1819–1866) on 29 February 1840 in Brighton, England. Sarah was the daughter of Amon Henry Wilds (1790–1857) and Sarah Pain (1791–1871). Edward and Sarah had four children, all born in Brighton:

- Guillimina Constance Sellon (1842–1842)
- Ernest Littlehales Sellon (1847–1926); college lecturer...died in Brentford, England
- William Loftus Sellon (1851–1895); a painter...died in Edinburgh, Scotland
- Marmaduke St Juste Sellon (1855–1925); a priest...died in Paris, France

== Life and writings ==
Sellon joined the army at the age of 16 and served in India for ten years, eventually being promoted to captain. In 1844 he took a wife, but finding that she was not as rich as he had been led to believe before the marriage, left her to live in London with his mother at Bruton Street. Here, after two years, his wife rejoined him, but now Sellon was keeping a mistress in another part of town, and had seduced his fourteen-year-old parlour maid, a girl called Emma. His wife's discovery of this latter affair led to fighting, and her leaving him, though Sellon was seemingly unrepentant. Hard times followed after the family fortune was lost and Sellon was constrained to work as a stagecoach driver on the Cambridge Mail for two years and afterwards as a fencing master. Later on, after numerous affairs, he was reconciled with his wife and went to live with her in a village in the New Forest, Hampshire for three years. After she had a child, though, he grew tired of her and returned to London where he resumed a life of debauchery. A final reconciliation with his wife was engineered by a rich relation of Sellon, of whom the latter had financial expectations. This was, however, terminated when his wife discovered him leading a group of schoolgirls into a local wood "for a game of hide and seek".

In his last years Sellon wrote erotica for the pornographic publisher William Dugdale. These included The New Epicurean (1865) and a memoir entitled The Ups and Downs of Life (1867) which featured his erotic escapades in India. Sellon is one of two likely candidates for authorship of the erotic novel The Romance of Lust. He also wrote papers on phallic worship and Ophiolatreia, a book on snake worship.

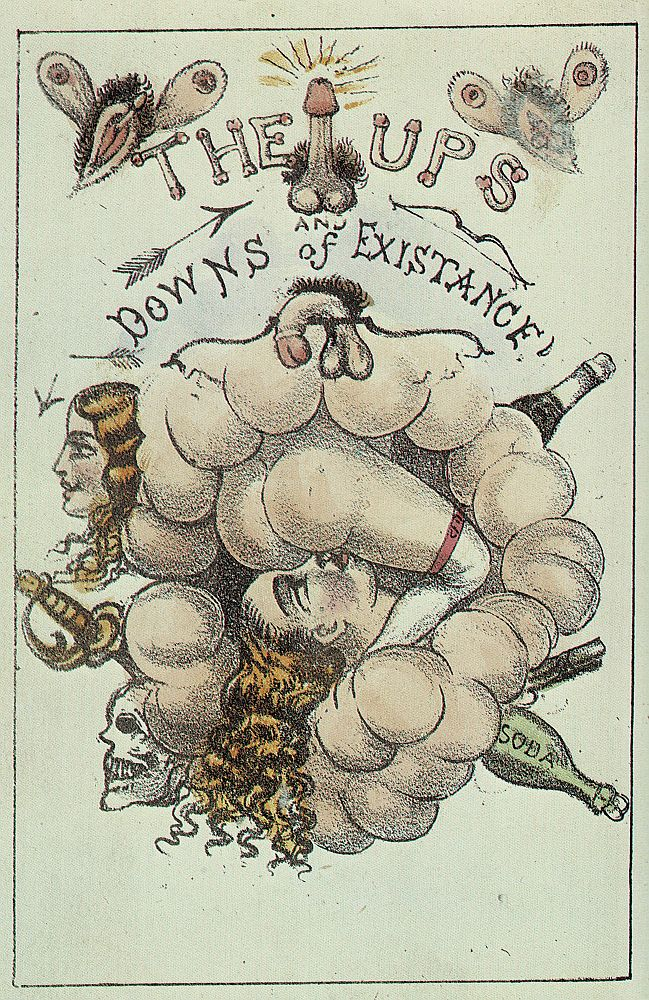
Frontispice of his autobiography (London, 1867).

== Death ==
In April 1866, at the age of forty-eight, he shot himself fatally at Webb's Hotel, Piccadilly (now the site of the Criterion Theatre). The manner of his death is said to have been a surprise to his 'friends and family alike. No one ever suspected that this happy-go-lucky soldier...might one day plunge to such depths of melancholy.'

== Selected publications ==
- 1848: Herbert Breakspear – a novel about the Mahratta War, set in India.
- 1865: The New Epicurean: The delights of sex, Facetiously and Philosophically Considered, in Graphic Letters Addressed to Young Ladies of Quality – falsely dated "1740", and written as an eighteenth-century pastiche, it is in fact from the pen of Sellon and dates to 1865.
- 1865: "On the Phallic Worship of India", in: Memoirs read before the Anthropological Society of London, Vol. 1, pp. 327–34
- 1866: The Adventures of a Schoolboy by James Campbell – illustrator.
- 1866: The New Ladies' Tickler, or Adventures of Lady Lovesport and the Audacious Harry (1866) – dealing with flagellation
- 1866: Phoebe Kissagen; or the Remarkable Adventures, Schemes, Wiles and Devilries of une Maquerelle being a sequel to the 'New Epicurean, etc.' – falsely dated 1743.
- 1867: The Ups and Downs of Life – an erotic autobiography.
- 1889: Ophiolatreia: an account of the rites and mysteries connected with the origin, rise, and development of serpent worship in various parts of the world, enriched with interesting traditions, and a full description of the celebrated serpent mounds & temples, the whole forming an exposition of one of the phases of phallic, or sex worship (sometimes ascribed to Hargraves Jennings) External link
- 1902: Annotations on the Sacred Writings of the Hindus, being an epitome of some of the most remarkable and leading tenets in the faith of the Hindu people
- 2017: Sellon's Annotations (revised by J. Lange with additional information, plus two papers previously published in 'Memoirs Read before the Anthropological Society,' a glossary, and an appendix revealing the identity of Sellon's silent source) ISBN 1545416362
