= Henry Spencer Ashbee =

Book collector and writer (1834–1900)

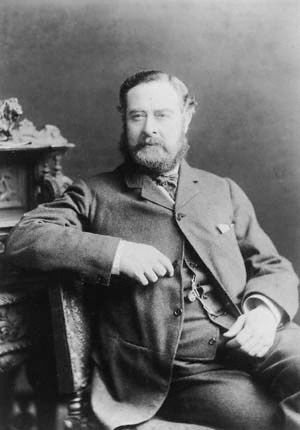
Ashbee in 1889

Henry Spencer Ashbee (21 April 1834 – 29 July 1900) was a book collector, writer and bibliographer. He is notable for his massive, clandestine three-volume bibliography of erotic literature published under the pseudonym of Pisanus Fraxi.

He left his large collections of books to the British Museum, and also 48 paintings, mostly contemporary works, to the Victoria and Albert Museum.

== Life ==
Ashbee was born in Southwark, London, the son of Robert and Frances Ashbee (née Spencer). He became the senior partner in the London branch of the firm of Charles Lavy & Co. He travelled extensively during his life, including Europe, Japan, and San Francisco, collaborating with the architect Alexander Graham on Travels in Tunisia, published in 1887.

Ashbee married Elisabeth Lavy in 1862. Elizabeth (1841–1919) was the daughter of Edward Otto Charles Lavy, who founded the Hamburg firm in 1838. Elizabeth's brother Charles Lavy (1842–1928) inherited the firm and became a politician in Germany.

The Ashbees had one son, Charles (the designer Charles Robert Ashbee, born 1863), and three daughters. His family life grew unhappier as he aged. As he became more conservative, his family followed the progressive movement of the era. "The 'excessive education' of his daughters irritated him, his Jewish wife's pro-suffragism infuriated him, and he became estranged from his socialist homosexual son, Charles". Henry and Elisabeth separated in 1893. Henry Spencer Ashbee is buried in Kensal Green Cemetery.

== Book collection ==
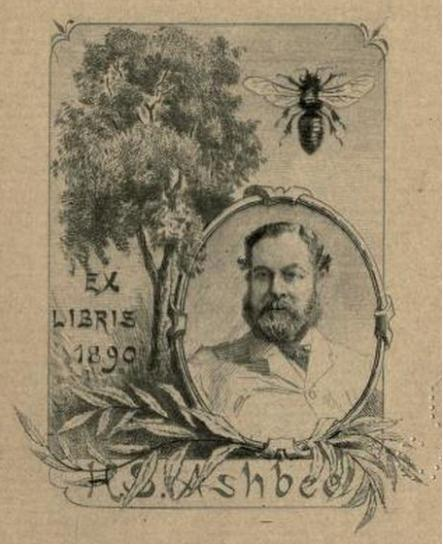
Ashbee's book plate, designed by Paul Avril

Ashbee was an avid book collector, with perhaps the world's most extensive collections of Miguel de Cervantes and erotica. Influenced by a friendship with the Belgian diplomat Joseph Octave Delepierre, his erotica collecting proceeded with purchases in Amsterdam, Brussels, and Paris.

Ashbee was a part of a loose intellectual fraternity of English gentlemen who discussed sexual matters with an openness that was at odds with Victorian mores; this fraternity included Richard Francis Burton, Richard Monckton Milnes, Algernon Charles Swinburne and others. He also amassed thousands of volumes of pornography in several languages. He wrote on sex under the Latin pseudonyms "Fraxinus" (Ash) and "Apis" (Bee) and sometimes combined them as "Pisanus Fraxi".

Ashbee's will left his entire book collection to the British Museum, with the condition that the erotic works had to be accepted along with the more conventional items. Because the trustees of the Museum wanted the materials related to Cervantes, they decided to accept the entire bequest but not without some reluctance. The trustees were allowed to destroy any of the books if they already had a duplicate, but in the event went much further and destroyed six boxes "of offensive matter which is of no value or interest whatsoever" including cheaply produced Victorian erotica. The remainder of the erotic works formed the core of the Private Case which were kept hidden from readers in the British Library for many years; they include a work by William Simpson Potter. (See also Secretum).

== Works ==
- The Encyclopedia of Erotic Literature. New York: Documentary Books. 1962. "3 Volumes in Slipcase. first published between 1877 and 1885"

Ashbee's most famous works were his three bibliographies of erotic works:

- Index Librorum Prohibitorum: being Notes Bio- Biblio- Icono- graphical and Critical, on Curious and Uncommon Books, by Pisanus Fraxi. London, privately printed, 1877. (The name is borrowed from the Catholic Church's list of banned books, Index Librorum Prohibitorum). Translation: A Catalogue of Books which should be Prohibited. A facsimile edition was printed in 1960 by Charles Skilton Ltd., London, "limited to 395 copies" (p. 543). In at least the facsimile, the title page reads "Index Librorum Prohibitoru" [the final "m" is missing]. (Charles Skilton was the publisher of the Billy Bunter series of school stories.)
- Centuria Librorum Absconditorum: being Notes Bio- Icono- graphical and Critical, on Curious and Uncommon Books. London, privately printed, 1879, online. Translation: A Hundred Books that should be Hidden.
- Catena Librorum Tacendorum: being Notes Bio- Icono- graphical and Critical, on Curious and Uncommon Books. London, privately printed, 1885, online. Translation: Further Books which should not be mentioned.

The Index was arranged alphabetically by title, the Centuria and Catena by subject. Ashbee includes plot summaries of the works listed, with liberal quotations. Of particular note are the 300 pages of the Centuria devoted to anti-Catholic pornography. Initially only 250 copies of each volume were printed.

Ashbee is suspected to be "Walter", the author of My Secret Life, a lengthy sexual memoir of a Victorian gentleman.

== Legacy ==
Ashbee was the subject of a 2001 biography by Ian Gibson, The Erotomaniac.

A character based on Ashbee is central to Sarah Waters's award-winning novel Fingersmith (2002): a man obsessively collecting and indexing pornography and works about human sexuality, in an atmosphere of oppressive Victorian hypocrisy.
