= Pornotopia =

Idea in theory describing ideal space of pornography

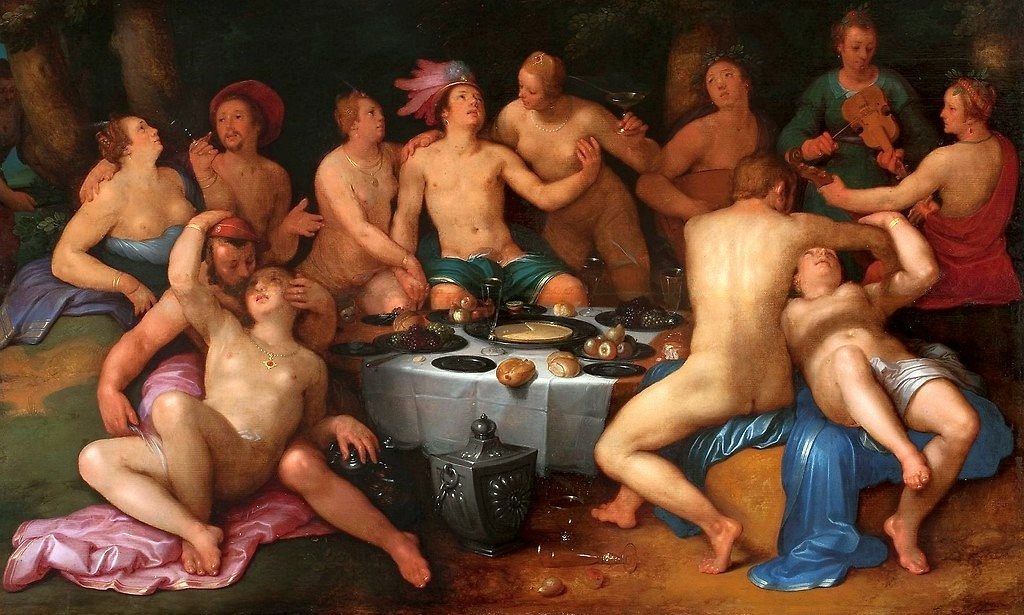
An artistic depiction of sexual fantasies and human sexual activities, 1615

In critical theory, pornotopia describes an imagined space determined by sexual fantasies and dominated by human sexual activity, expressed in and encompassing erotica and pornography. The word was coined by the American literary critic Steven Marcus in his 1966 book The Other Victorians, deriving inspiration from nineteenth-century English literature on sexuality by moralists, physicians, and erotic authors.

== Structure ==
A pornotopia is characterized by its freedom from the normal social restraints of place and time ingrained by the Real, instead orienting around unconscious laws of enjoyment. Steven Marcus summarized this aspect with the principle that "it is always summertime in pornotopia". Barriers to enjoyment and subsequently liberated sexuality are either split off entirely, or dissolved through an excess of sexual activity, provoking jouissance.

In pornotopias, narrative flows are suspended on a tenuous line; examples include picaresque novels allowing for multiple encounters, and Sadean novels with multiplications of all possible combinations of persons and their orifices. Marcus argued that because of the freedom offered by the enjoyment of pornography that paradoxically traps subjects in its enjoyment, besides the orgasm, "it is an end, a conclusion of any kind, that pornography most resists". For example, Susan Sontag singled out Catherine Robbe-Grillet's 1956 novel The Image as transcending its genre because its conclusion retrospectively illuminates the novel's sadomasochistic events and leaves them in a suspense that suggests limitless continuation, which is a key component of a pornotopia.

== Characterization ==
In a pornotopia, characters are typically hypersexual, forever ready for sex with an almost omnipotent capacity for libido, renewal and further activity, evoking freedom from external reality and timelessness. In this sense, they can often be invulnerable; for example, in Anne Desclos' 1954 novel Story of O, the novel's central metaphor demonstrates that just as the chains never rust in her fairytale-style château, the inhabitants are never damaged by their ordeals, and never lose any of their allure. This capacity of the novel, and of pornotopias in general, to allow the enjoyment of the Imaginary to overtake the reality principle was observed by Jacques Lacan, saying that "whatever happens to the subject is incapable of spoiling the image in question, incapable even of wearing it out".

== Criticism ==
Following the publication of The Other Victorians, historian Brian Harrison criticized Steven Marcus' concept of pornotopia for what he saw as a biased use of literary sources. From Harrison's analysis, Marcus exclusively drew on a small number of Victorian texts oriented around sexuality, from which he developed a lengthy conceptual conclusion about the intents and drives of pornography in general. In 2017, literary critic Thomas Joudrey, drawing on the same archive that Marcus had examined at the Kinsey Institute, also challenged the concept of pornotopia by calling attention to the equally pervasive presence of bodily failure, decay, suffering and death in Victorian pornographic novels, appearing as impotence, castration, torn foreskins, slack vaginas, incontinence and syphilitic outbreaks, although this could also be taken as transgressive enjoyment. Joudrey further challenged the concept of pornotopia by drawing attention to extensive political commentary in pornographic magazines such as The Pearl, including references to the Reform Bills and Contagious Diseases Acts, in addition to many controversial public figures, including Annie Besant, Charles Spurgeon, Wilfrid Lawson, Newman Hall, Edmund Burke, William Gladstone, and Robert Peel, where such a space of liberated and limitless sexuality is implausible against the social demands of non-sexual activity.

== See also ==
- Assemblage
- Cornucopia
- Escapism
- Jouissance
- Pastoral
- Raunch culture
- Repressive desublimation
- Saturnalia
- Sentimentalism
- Sexual fantasy
- The Symbolic
- Utopia
