= List of authors of erotic works =

The list of authors of erotic works contains entries of writers of historic sexual works both, fictional and instructional. It includes authors both historic and contemporary.

== Sex manuals ==
- Vatsayana, famous for the Kama Sutra
- Yasodhara, author of the Jayamangala
- Kokkoka, author of the Ratirahasya
- Kalyanamalla, author of the Ananga Ranga
- Praudha Devaraya, author of the Ratiratna Pradipika
- Ovid, Roman author famous for the Ars Amatoria
- Ge Hong, Jin dynasty author of Pao-Pu Zhi
- Muhammad ibn Muhammad al-Nafzawi, author of The Perfumed Garden
- Hua Tuo, author of On Venereal disease.
- Sun Simiao, author of On the Loss and Gain of The Chamber Art
- Wan Quan, author of Essentials for Extending Posterity
- Gao Lian, author of On Abstinence in Sex
- Alex Comfort, author of The Joy of Sex

== Fiction ==
- Jacques Abeille, author of De la vie d'une chienne and other erotic books
- Kathy Acker, postmodern pornographer, author of I Dreamt I Was a Nymphomaniac
- Laura Antoniou, author of The Marketplace
- Emmanuelle Arsan, author of the novel Emmanuelle and various other works
- Nicholson Baker, author of Vox
- Ivan Barkov
- Georges Bataille, author of Story of the Eye
- Giovanni Boccaccio, Italian author contemporary and friend of Petrarch; wrote Decameron a collection of 100 short stories, some of which are erotic, considered masterpieces of the genre.
- Susie Bright
- Patrick (Pat) Califia, author of Macho Sluts
- Nicolas Chorier – author of L'académie des dames
- M. Christian, author of The Bachelor Machine and other works
- John Cleland, author of Fanny Hill
- Sylvia Day
- Daniel Defoe, author of Moll Flanders
- Andreas Embirikos, author of The Great Eastern
- Esparbec, author of La Pharmacienne
- Sunil Gangopadhyay, Bengali Indian author who wrote maximum number of erotic novels in Bengali literature
- Elias Gaucher
- Günter Grass, author of The Tin Drum and Cat and Mouse
- Maxim Jakubowski, editor of the Mammoth Erotica series and a major erotica writer in his own right
- Yasunari Kawabata, author of Beauty and Sadness
- Caitlín R. Kiernan — author of Frog Toes and Tentacles, Tales from the Woeful Platypus, and Sirenia Digest
- D. H. Lawrence, author of Lady Chatterley's Lover
- William Levy
- Marilyn Jaye Lewis, author of Neptune and Surf and Lust: Bisexual Erotica
- E L James, author of Fifty Shades of Grey
- Barry N. Malzberg, author of Screen and writer/editor for Olympia Press
- Henry Miller, author of Tropic of Cancer
- A. R. Morlan
- Vladimir Nabokov, Russian-born English-language writer, author of Lolita
- Taslima Nasrin, Bangladeshi author who wrote "Lajja" in 1993, an explicit sexual book.
- Anaïs Nin, author of Delta of Venus
- Kenzaburō Ōe, author of Seventeen, J, and A Personal Matter
- Alexander Pushkin, author of the Gabrieliad
- Pauline Réage, author of Story of O
- Anne Rice, also writing as A. N. Roquelaure
- Catherine Robbe-Grillet, writing as Jean de Berg and Jeanne de Berg
- Leopold von Sacher-Masoch, author of Venus in Furs
- The Marquis de Sade, author of Justine, or the Misfortunes of Virtue
- Mitzi Szereto, author of The Wilde Passions of Dorian Gray, Pride and Prejudice: Hidden Lusts, and Phantom: The Immortal, among others.
- William Simpson Potter, author of Romance of Lust
- Jun'ichirō Tanizaki, author of The Key, Naomi, and Quicksand
- Tamara Thorne, author of the Sorority series
- Alexander Trocchi
- Mark Twain, author of 1601
- Marco Vassi, author of "The Erotic Comedies", "Devil's Sperm Is Cold", and "The Stoned Apocalypse"
- Mario Vargas Llosa, author of The Notebooks of Don Rigoberto
- Zane.

=== Chinese erotica ===
- Li Yu, author of The Carnal Prayer Mat
- Lanling Xiaoxiao Sheng, author of Jin Ping Mei
- Lü Tiancheng, author of The Embroidered Couch
- David Tod Roy, translator and editor of The Plum in the Garden Vase

== Poetry ==
- Ovid, Roman erotic poet
- Catullus, Roman erotic poet
- Sextus Propertius, Roman poet
- Sappho, Greek poet from the island of Lesbos who wrote love poetry to young women.
- Petrarch, Italian poet, considered, together with Dante, the father of Renaissance. His love sonnets dedicated to Laura are masterpieces of erotic poetry
- Bai Juyi, Romantic poet of Tang dynasty
- King Solomon, Author, according to Judeo-Christian tradition, of the Song of Songs.
- John Donne, 17th-18th century British poet. Books: "Poems", "Love Poems".
- John Wilmot, 2nd Earl of Rochester, British 17th Century libertine
- Hồ Xuân Hương, 18th-19th century Vietnamese poet
- Pietro Aretino, Italian poet. Books: "The School of Whoredom", "The Secret Life of Nuns", "Sonetti Lussuriosi e Dubbi Amorosi", "The Secret Life of Wives", "La Cortigiana", "Ragionamenti".
- Manuel Maria Barbosa du Bocage, Portuguese poet. Books: "Poesias Eróticas, Burlescas e Satíricas", "Os Amores", "Opera Omnia".
- Pierre Louys, Belgian poet. Books: "Poesies Erotiques: la femme, les vulves legendaires", "Les soeurs à l'envers", "Oeuvre Erotique", "Le nom de la femme", "Le femme et le Pantin", "Trois filles de leur mére", "Les cahiers de la Nrf", "Les chansons de Bilitis", "Manual da Civilidade Destinado às Meninas para uso nas Escolas".
- Gregório de Mattos, Brazilian poet. Books: "Poemas Satíricos", "Para que todos entendais poesia", "Desenganos da vida humana e outros poema".
- Olga Savary, Brazilian poet. Books: "Espelho Provisório", "Sumidouro", "Altaonda", "Magma", "Natureza Viva", "Hai-Kais", "Linha d'água", "Berço Esplendido", "Retratos", "Rudá", "Éden Hades", "Morte de Moema", "Anima Animalis", "O Olhar Dourado do Abismo", "Repertório Selvagem".
- Hilda Hilst, Brazilian poet. Books: "Fico Besta Quando me Entendem", "Da Poesia", "Porno Chic", "De Amor Tenho Vivido", "Cantares", "Baladas", "A Obscena Senhora D", "Obscenica", "O Caderno Rosa de Lori Lamby", "Tu Não Te Moves de Ti", "Contos D'Escárnio/Textos Grotescos", "Fluxo Floema", "Cartas de um Sedutor", "Kadosh", "Como Meus Olhos de Cão", "Poemas Malditos, Gozosos e Devotos", "Do Desejo", "Rutilos", "Exercícios".
- Glauco Mattoso, Brazilian poet. Books: "Memórias de um Pueteiro", "Línguas na Papa", "O Calvário dos Carecas: História do Trote Estudantil", "Rockabillyrics", "Limeiriques & Outros Debiques Glauquianos", "Haicais Paulistanos", "Galeria Alegria", "O Glosador Motejoso", "Animalesca Escolha", "Pegadas Noturnas: Dissonetos Barrockistas", "Poética na Política", "Poesia Digesta", "A Planta da Donzela", "A Aranha Punk", "A Letra da Ley", "O Cancioneiro Carioca e Brasileiro", "Contos Hediondos", "Cinco Ciclos e Meio Século", "Tripé do Tripúdio e Outros Contos Hediondos", "Raymundo Curupyra, O Caypora: Romance Lyrico", "Cautos Causos", "Outros Cautos Causos", "Sacola de Feira", "Poesia Vaginal: Cem Sonnettos Sacanas", "Curso de Refeologia", "Graphophobia", "Arachnophobia", "Testamento satanista".
- Cairo Trindade, Brazilian poet. Books: "PoetAstro", "Saca na geral", "Liberatura", "Poematemagia", "Poesya, que porra é essa?".
- Vinni Corrêa, Brazilian poet. Books: "Coma de 4", "Literatura de Bordel", "Lunch Box", "Sexo a Três", "Com Mamas na Língua".

== Autobiography ==
- Emmanuelle Arsan, author of Emmanuelle
- Toni Bentley, author of The Surrender: An Erotic Memoir
- Vanessa Duriès, author of Le lien
- Nancy Friday
- Henry Spencer Ashbee, author of My Secret Life
- Frank Harris, multiple-volume memoir My Life and Loves
- Catherine Millet, author of The Sexual Life of Catherine M.
- Georges Simenon
- Edward Avery, editor of The Autobiography of a Flea
- Xaviera Hollander, author of The Happy Hooker
