= Erotic fiction =

Genre of fiction

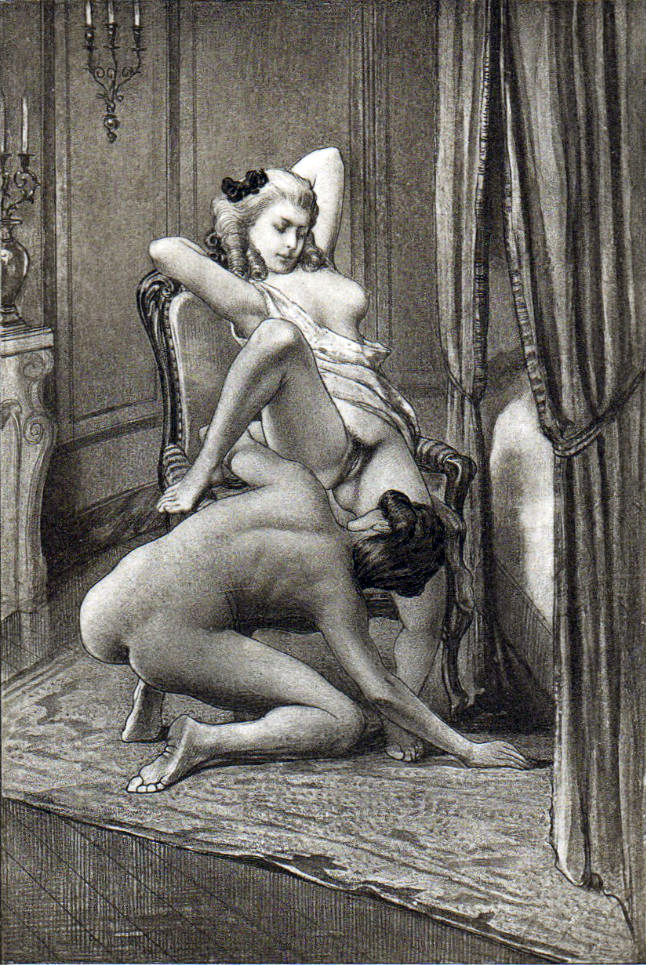
1907 illustration by Édouard-Henri Avril of the erotic novel Fanny Hill (1748)

Erotic fiction is a part of erotic literature and a genre of fiction that portrays sex or sexual themes, generally in a more literary or serious way than the fiction seen in pornographic magazines. It sometimes includes elements of satire or social criticism. Such works have frequently been banned by the government or religious authorities. Non-fictional works that portray sex or sexual themes may contain fictional elements. Calling an erotic book 'a memoir' is a literary device that is common in this genre. For reasons similar to those that make pseudonyms both commonplace and often deviously set up, the boundary between fiction and non-fiction is broad.

Erotic fiction has been credited in large part for the sexual awakening and liberation of women in the 20th and 21st centuries.

== History of erotic fiction ==
=== Ancient, medieval, and early modern periods ===
The Satyricon of Petronius Arbiter (later made into a film by Fellini) is an ancient Roman novel, which has partially survived, narrating the misadventures of an impotent man named Encolpius, who has been cursed by the god Priapus. The novel is filled with bawdy and obscene episodes, including orgies, ritual sex, and other erotic incidents. The discovery of several fragments of Lollianos's Phoenician Tale reveal that a genre of picaresque erotic novel also existed in ancient Greece. Some of the ancient Greek romance novels, such as Daphnis and Chloe, also contain elements of sexual fantasy.

From the medieval period, there is the Decameron (1353) by the Italian Giovanni Boccaccio (made into a film by Pasolini) which features tales of lechery by monks and the seduction of nuns from convents. This book was banned in many countries. Even five centuries after publication, copies were seized and destroyed by the authorities in the US and the UK. For instance, between 1954 and 1958 eight orders for destruction of the book were made by English magistrates.

From the 15th century, another classic of Italian erotica is a series of bawdy folk tales called the Facetiae by Gian Francesco Poggio Bracciolini. The Tale of Two Lovers (Latin: Historia de duobus amantibus) written in 1444 was one of the bestselling books of the 15th century, even before its author, Aeneas Sylvius Piccolomini, became Pope Pius II. It is one of the earliest examples of an epistolary novel, full of erotic imagery. The first printed edition was published by Ulrich Zel in Cologne between 1467 and 1470.

The 16th century was notable for the Heptaméron of Marguerite de Navarre (1558), inspired by Boccaccio's Decameron and the notorious I Modi which married erotic drawings, depicting postures assumed in sexual intercourse, by Giulio Romano, with obscene sonnets by Pietro Aretino.

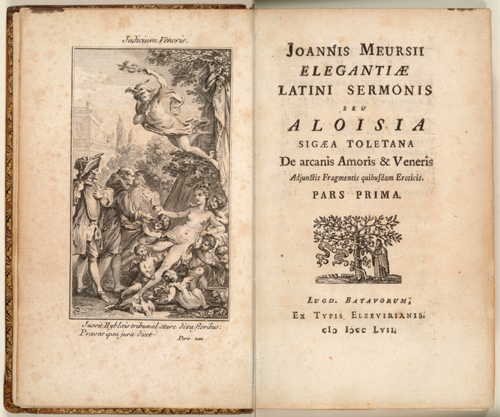
Frontispiece and title page of the 1757 Latin edition of the Dialogues of Luisa Sigea (first published c. 1660) by Nicholas Chorier

Aretino also wrote the celebrated whore dialogue Ragionamenti, in which the sex lives of wives, whores and nuns are compared and contrasted. Later works in the same genre include La Retorica delle Puttane (The Whores' Rhetoric) (1642) by Ferrante Pallavicino; L'école des filles (The school for girls) (1655), attributed to Michel Millot and Jean L'Ange. and The Dialogues of Luisa Sigea (c. 1660) by Nicolas Chorier. Such works typically concerned the sexual education of a naive younger woman by an experienced older woman and often included elements of philosophising, satire and anti-clericalism. Donald Thomas has translated L'École des filles, as The School of Venus, (1972), described on its back cover as "both an uninhibited manual of sexual technique and an erotic masterpiece of the first order". In his diary Samuel Pepys records reading and (in an often censored passage) masturbating over this work. Chorier's Dialogues of Luisa Sigea goes a bit further than its predecessors in this genre and has the older female giving practical instruction of a lesbian nature to the younger woman plus recommending the spiritual and erotic benefits of a flogging from willing members of the holy orders. This work was translated into many languages under various different titles, appearing in English as A Dialogue between a Married Woman and a Maid in various editions. The School of Women first appeared as a work in Latin entitled Aloisiae Sigaeae, Toletanae, Satyra sotadica de arcanis Amoris et Veneris. This manuscript claimed that it was originally written in Spanish by Luisa Sigea de Velasco, an erudite poet and maid of honor at the court of Lisbon and was then translated into Latin by Jean or Johannes Meursius. The attribution to Sigea and Meursius was a lie; the true author was Nicolas Chorier.

A unique work of this time is Sodom, or the Quintessence of Debauchery (1684), a closet play by the notorious Restoration rake, John Wilmot, 2nd Earl of Rochester in which Bolloxinion, King of Sodom, authorises "that buggery may be used O'er all the land, so cunt be not abused", which order, though appealing to soldiery, has deleterious effects generally, leading the court physician to counsel: "Fuck women, and let Bugg'ry be no more".

=== 18th century ===
An early pioneer of the publication of erotic works in England was Edmund Curll (1675–1747), who published many of the Merryland books. These were an English genre of erotic fiction in which the female body (and sometimes the male) was described in terms of a landscape. The earliest work in this genre seems to be Erotopolis: The Present State of Bettyland (1684) probably by Charles Cotton. This was included, in abbreviated form, in The Potent Ally: or Succours from Merryland (1741). Other works include A New Description of Merryland. Containing a Topographical, Geographical and Natural History of that Country (1740) by Thomas Stretzer, Merryland Displayed (1741) and set of maps entitled A Compleat Set of Charts of the Coasts of Merryland (1745). The last book in this genre appears to be a parody of Laurence Sterne's A Sentimental Journey Through France and Italy (1768) entitled La souricière. The Mousetrap. A Facetious and Sentimental Excursion through part of Austrian Flanders and France (1794) by "Timothy Touchit".

The rise of the novel in 18th-century England provided a new medium for erotica. One of the most famous in this genre was Fanny Hill (1748) by John Cleland. This book set a standard in literary smut and was often adapted for the cinema in the 20th century. Peter Fryer suggests that Fanny Hill was a high point in British erotica, at least in the eighteenth century, in a way that mainstream literature around it had also reached a peak at that time, with writers like Defoe, Richardson and Fielding all having made important and lasting contributions to literature in its first half. After 1750, he suggests, when the Romantic period began, the quality of mainstream writing and of smut declined in tandem. Writes Fryer: "sex was driven out of the English novel in the latter half of the eighteenth century. The castration of imaginative English literature made the clandestine literature of sex the most poverty stricken and boring in Europe".

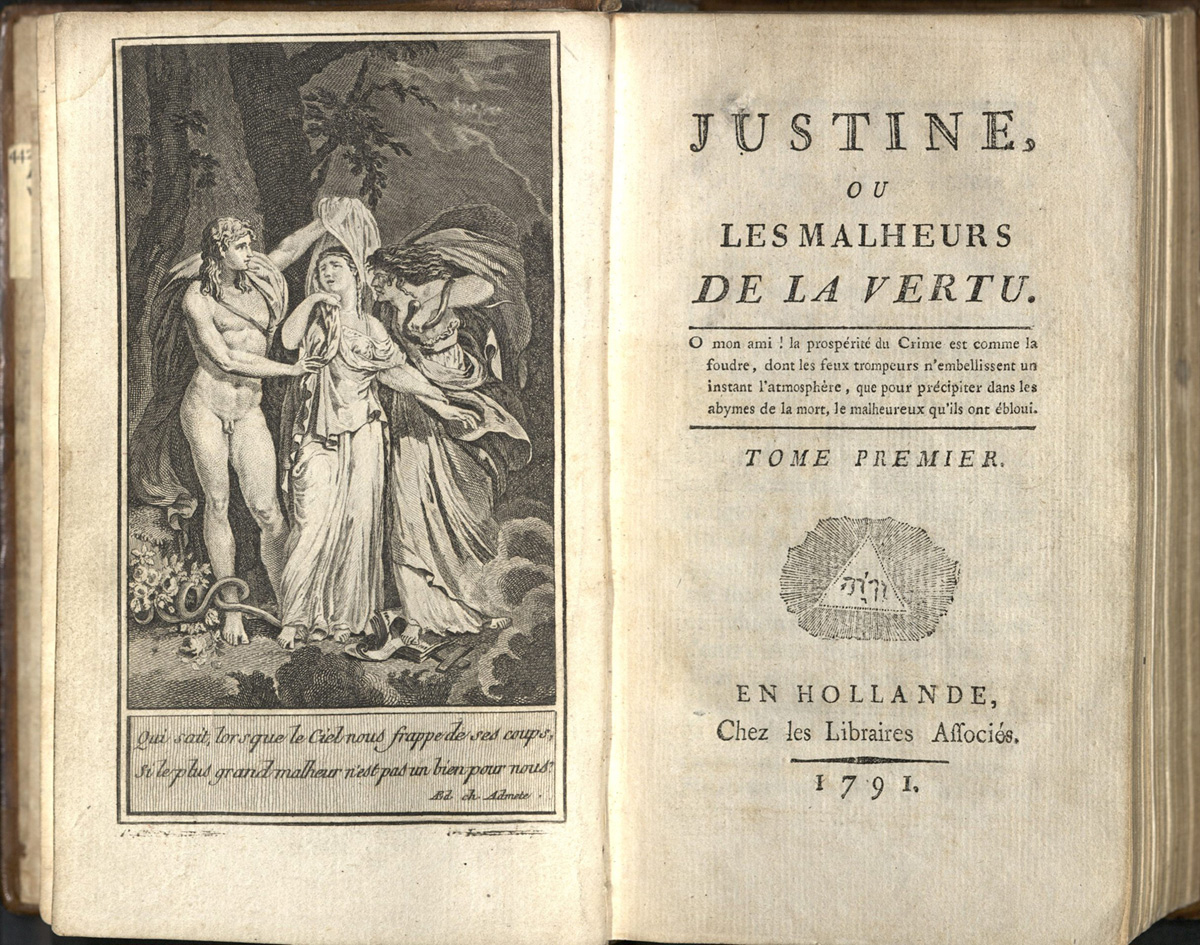
Frontispiece and title page of the first edition of Justine, or The Misfortunes of Virtue (1791) by Philippe Chéry

French writers kept their stride. One genre, which vies in oddness with the English "Merryland" productions, was inspired by the newly translated Arabian Nights and involved the transformation of people into objects which were in propinquity with or employed in sexual relationships: such as sofas, dildos and even bidets. The climax of this trend is represented in French philosopher Diderot's Les Bijoux indiscrets (1747) in which a magic ring is employed to get women's vaginas to give an account of their intimate sexual histories.

Other works of French erotica from this period include Thérèse Philosophe (1748) by Jean-Baptiste de Boyer, Marquis d'Argens which describes a girl's initiation into the secrets of both philosophy and sex; The Lifted Curtain or Laura's Education, about a young girl's sexual initiation by her father, written by the French revolutionary politician Comte de Mirabeau; and Les Liaisons dangereuses (Dangerous Liaisons) by Pierre Choderlos de Laclos, first published in 1782.

In the late 18th century, such works as Justine, or the Misfortunes of Virtue and 120 Days of Sodom by the Marquis de Sade were exemplars of the theme of sado-masochism and influenced later erotic accounts of sadism and masochism in fiction. De Sade (as did the later writer Sacher-Masoch) lent his name to the sexual acts which he describes in his work.

=== 19th century ===
In the Victorian period, the quality of erotic fiction was much below that of the previous century—it was largely written by 'hacks'. Some works, however, borrowed from established literary models, such as Dickens. The period also featured a form of social stratification. Even in the throes of orgasm, the social distinctions between master and servant (including form of address) were scrupulously observed. Significant elements of sado-masochism were present in some examples, perhaps reflecting the influence of the English public school, where flagellation was routinely used as a punishment. These clandestine works were often anonymous or written under a pseudonym, and sometimes undated, thus definite information about them often proves elusive.

English erotic novels from this period include The Lustful Turk (1828); The Romance of Lust (1873); The Convent School, or Early Experiences of A Young Flagellant (1876) by Rosa Coote [pseud.]; The Mysteries of Verbena House, or, Miss Bellasis Birched for Thieving (1882) by Etonensis [pseud.], actually by George Augustus Sala and James Campbell Reddie; The Autobiography of a Flea (1887); Venus in India (1889) by 'Captain Charles Devereaux'; Flossie, a Venus of Fifteen: By one who knew this Charming Goddess and worshipped at her shrine (1897). A novel called Beatrice, once marketed as another classic of Victorian erotica from the pen of the ubiquitous "Anon", now appears to be a very clever 20th-century pastiche of Victorian pornography. It first appeared in 1982 and was written by one Gordon Grimley, a sometime managing director of Penthouse International.

Clandestine erotic periodicals of this age include The Pearl, The Oyster and The Boudoir, collections of erotic tales, rhymes, songs and parodies published in London between 1879 and 1883.

The centre of the trade in such material in England at this period was Holywell Street, off the Strand, London. An important publisher of erotic material in the early 19th century was George Cannon (1789–1854), followed in mid-century by William Dugdale (1800–1868) and John Camden Hotten (1832–1873).

An evaluation of 19th-century (pre-1885) and earlier underground erotica, from the author's own private archive, is provided by Victorian writer Henry Spencer Ashbee, using the pseudonym "Pisanus Fraxi", in his bibliographical trilogy Index Librorum Prohibitorum (1877), Centuria Librorum Absconditorum (1879) and Catena Librorum Tacendorum (1885). His plot summaries of the works he discusses in these privately printed volumes are themselves a contribution to the genre. Originally of very limited circulation, changing attitudes have led to his work now being widely available.

Notable European works of erotica at this time were Gamiani, or Two Nights of Excess (1833) by Frenchman Alfred de Musset and Venus in Furs (1870) by the Austrian author Leopold von Sacher-Masoch. The latter erotic novella brought the attention of the world to the phenomenon of masochism, named after the author.

Toward the end of the 19th century, a more "cultured" form of erotica began to appear by poets such as Algernon Charles Swinburne, who pursued themes of paganism, lesbianism and sado-masochism in such works as Lesbia Brandon and in contributions to The Whippingham Papers (1888) edited by St George Stock, author of The Romance of Chastisement (1866). This was associated with the Decadent movement, in particular, with Aubrey Beardsley and the Yellow Book. But it was also to be found in France, amongst such writers as Pierre Louys, author of Les chansons de Bilitis (1894) (a celebration of lesbianism and sexual awakening).

Pioneering works of gay male erotica from this time were The Sins of the Cities of the Plain (1881), which features the celebrated Victorian transvestite duo of Boulton and Park as characters, and Teleny, or The Reverse of the Medal (1893).

Two important publishers of erotic fiction at the end of the 19th century and the beginning of the 20th were Leonard Smithers (1861–1907) and Charles Carrington (1867–1921), both of whom were subject to legal injunctions from the British authorities in order to prohibit their trade in such material. Because of this legal harassment the latter conducted his business from Paris. Erotic fiction published by Carrington at this period includes Raped on the Railway: a True Story of a Lady who was first ravished and then flagellated on the Scotch Express (1894) and The Memoirs of Dolly Morton (1899) set on a slave-plantation in the Southern States of America.

=== 20th century ===
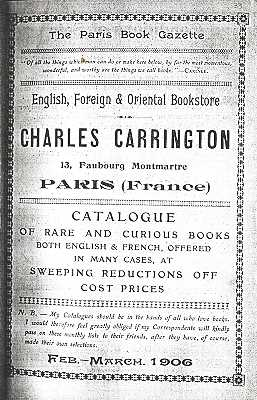
Coverpage of a catalogue of books published by Charles Carrington (Paris, 1906)

20th-century erotic fiction includes such classics of the genre as: Suburban Souls (1901), published by Carrington and possibly written by him also; The Confessions of Nemesis Hunt (issued in three volumes 1902, 1903, 1906), attributed to George Reginald Bacchus, printed by Duringe of Paris for Leonard Smithers in London; Josephine Mutzenbacher (1906) by Anon. (presumably Felix Salten); Sadopaideia (1907) by Anon. (possibly Algernon Charles Swinburne); Les Mémoires d'un jeune Don Juan (1907) and the somewhat disturbing Les onze mille verges (1907) by Guillaume Apollinaire; The Way of a Man with a Maid (1908) and A Weekend Visit by Anon.; Pleasure Bound Afloat (1908), Pleasure Bound Ashore (1909) and Maudie (1909) by Anon. (probably George Reginald Bacchus), and My Lustful Adventures (1911) by the pseudonymous 'Ramrod'; Manuel de civilité pour les petites filles à l'usage des maisons d'éducation (1917) and Trois filles de leur mère (1926) by Pierre Louys;, a memoir My Life and Loves by Frank Harris published in four volumes (1922-1927), Story of the Eye (1928) by Georges Bataille; Tropic of Cancer (1934) and Tropic of Capricorn (1938) by Henry Miller; The Story of O (1954) by Pauline Réage; Helen and Desire (1954) and Thongs (1955) by Alexander Trocchi; Ada, or Ardor (1969) by Vladimir Nabokov; Journal (1966), Delta of Venus (1978) and Little Birds (1979) by Anaïs Nin and The Bicycle Rider (1985) by Guy Davenport and Lila Says (1999) by an anonymous author.

A study found that the most popular of the Armed Services Editions paperbacks distributed to American soldiers during World War II "are novels that deal frankly with sexual relations (regardless of tone, literary merit and point of view, no matter whether the book is serious or humorous, romantically exciting or drably pedestrian)".

Vladimir Nabokov's Lolita is usually described as an erotic novel, but in the view of some it is a literary drama with elements of eroticism. Like Nabokov's Lolita, Johannes Linnankoski's The Song of the Blood-Red Flower is also often described as erotic novel, only a little explicit and cleverly cloaked in gentler romance.

Lolita and The Story of O were published by Olympia Press, a Paris-based publisher, launched in 1953 by Maurice Girodias as a rebadged version of the Obelisk Press he inherited from his father Jack Kahane. It published a mix of erotic fiction and avant-garde literary works. The Girls of Radcliff Hall is a roman à clef novel in the form of a lesbian girls' school story written in the 1930s by the British composer and bon-vivant Gerald Berners, the 14th Lord Berners, under the pseudonym "Adela Quebec", published and distributed privately in 1932.

Another trend in the twentieth century was the rise of the lesbian pulp fiction. Works such as The Price of Salt (1952), Spring Fire (1952), Desert of the Heart (1964), and Patience and Sarah (1969) were only a few examples of this subgenre. Many of the authors were women themselves, such as Gale Wilhelm and Ann Bannon. Many gay men also enjoyed gay pulp fiction, which borrowed the same sexploitation format as the lesbian books.

=== Asian erotic fiction ===
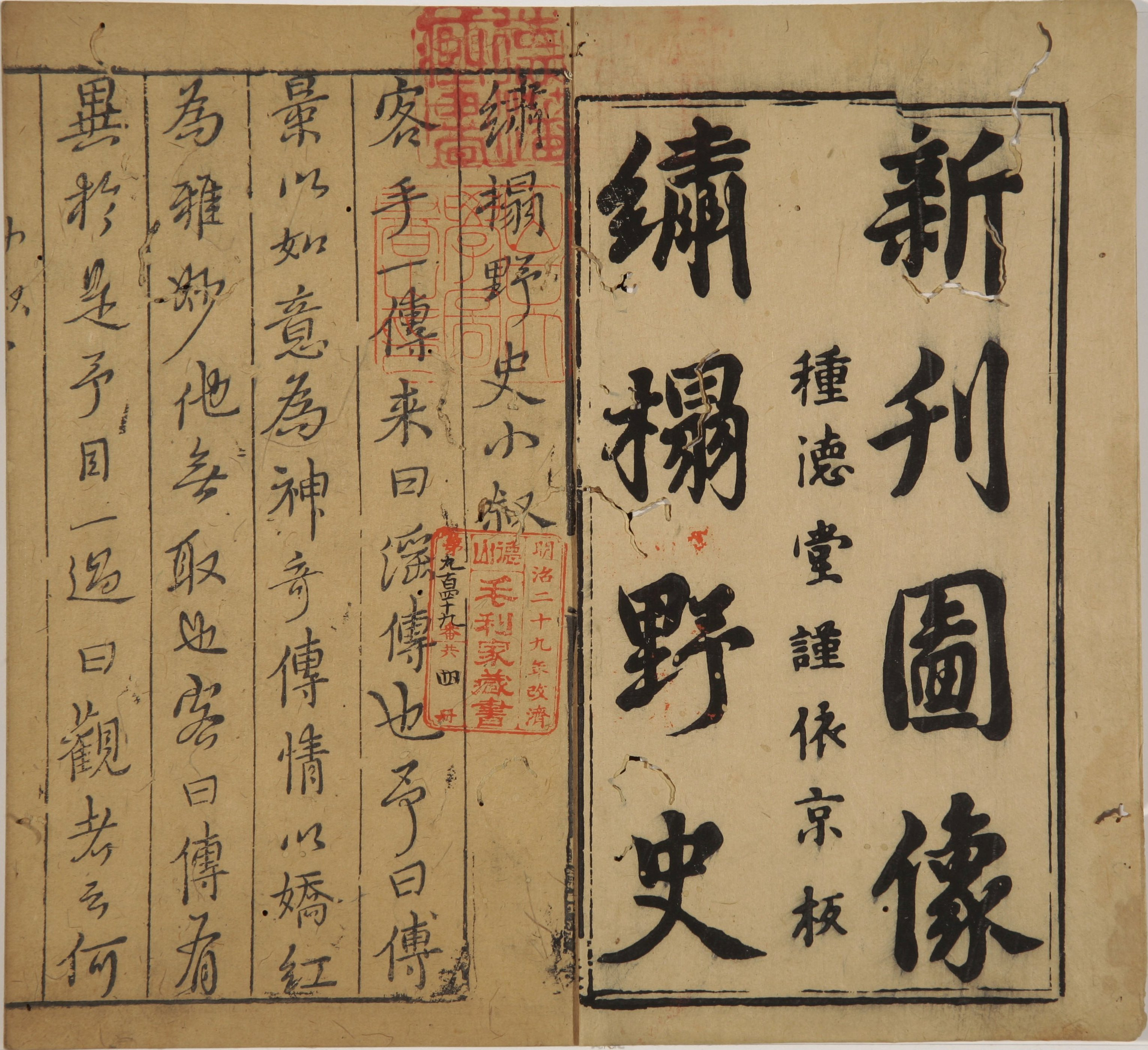
The title page from the first volume of a Ming dynasty edition of The Embroidered Couch, one of the most notorious and controversial erotic novels

Chinese literature has a rich catalogue of erotic novels that were published during the mid-Ming to early-Qing dynasties. Some well-known erotic novels with explicit sexuality during this period include Ruyijun zhuan (The Lord of Perfect Satisfaction), The Embroidered Couch, Su'e pian, Langshi, Chipozi zhuan, Zhulin yeshi, and The Carnal Prayer Mat. The critic Charles Stone has argued that pornographic technique is the "union of banality, obscenity, and repetition", and contains just the "rudiments" of plot, style, and characterization, while anything that is not sexually stimulating is avoided. If this is the case, he concluded, then The Lord of Perfect Satisfaction is the "fountainhead of Chinese erotica", but not pornography.

The novel Jin Ping Mei (or The Plum in the Golden Vase), written by an author who used only a pseudonym (as his real name is unknown), is generally regarded as the greatest of all Chinese erotic novels. Its literary status is unparalleled among erotic fiction and it has been described by critic Stephen Marche in the Los Angeles Review of Books as "one of the world's great novels, if not simply the greatest."

There is also a tradition of erotic fiction in Japan. Jun'ichirō Tanizaki often touches on erotic themes in his novels, eg. obsession in Naomi, lesbianism in Quicksand or sexuality in The Key. Some portion of this is doujinshi, or independent comics, which are often fan fiction. The sharebon (洒落本) was a pre-modern Japanese literary genre. Plots revolved around humor and entertainment at the pleasure quarters. It is a subgenre of gesaku.

=== Contemporary erotic fiction ===
In the 21st century, a number of female authors, including Alison Tyler, Rachel Kramer Bussel, and Carol Queen, rose to prominence. Mitzi Szereto is an editor and author who said she wants to see the term erotica removed from novels and anthologies that include depictions of sexual activities. Other authors celebrate the term but also question why literature featuring sexual activity should be considered outside literary fiction.

The debate was rekindled in 2012 by the release of the 50 Shades of Grey trilogy written by E. L. James. Its success gave rise to satires like Fifty Shames of Earl Grey by 'Fanny Merkin' (real name Andrew Shaffer), a book of essays called Fifty Writers on Fifty Shades (ed. Lori Perkins) and editors of erotic imprints re-evaluating the content and presentation of the genre.

One development in contemporary erotica is emphasis on the fact that many women, and not just men, are aroused by it. This is regardless of whether it is traditional pornography or tailor-made women's erotica. Romantic novels are sometimes marketed as erotica—or vice versa—as "mainstream" romance in recent decades has begun to exhibit blatant (if poetic) descriptions of sex. Erotic romance is a relatively new genre of romance with an erotic theme and very explicit love scenes, but with a romance at the heart of the story. Erotic fantasy is a subgenre of fantasy fiction and utilizes erotica in a fantasy setting. These stories can essentially cover any of the other subgenres of fantasy, such as high fantasy, contemporary fantasy, or even historical fantasy. The extents of the genre to break existing conventions and limits in subject matter have managed to shock popular audiences, with genres such as monster erotica emerging with the ease of digital publishing.

Erotic fantasy fiction has similarities to romantic fantasy but is more explicit. Erotic fantasy can also be found in fan fiction, which uses plot elements and characters from popular fiction such as television, film, or novels. Erotic fan fiction may use characters from existing works in non-canon relationships, such as slash (homoerotic) fan fiction. Fan fiction and its Japanese counterpart, doujinshi, account for an enormous proportion of all erotica written today.

=== Internet erotic fiction ===
The Internet and digital revolution in erotic depiction has changed the forms of representing scenes of a sexual nature.

Erotica was present on the Internet from its earliest days, as seen from rec.arts.erotica on Usenet. This news group was a moderated forum for the exchange of erotic stories that predated the creation of the World Wide Web. Most of this migrated to the alt.* hierarchy forums by the 1990s, including alt.sex.stories. The bandwidth/speeds available to end users on the internet influenced usage, and during early days of dial-up internet connections, the limited speeds, especially in developing countries, limited the number of users trying to access visual forms of erotica including images and videos, and might have created a niche for erotic literature. Platforms such as nifty.org presented a vast library of erotic literature categorized according to the narrative, including heterosexual, gay, bisexual and transgender themes.

The vast majority of Internet erotica is written by amateurs for the enjoyment of the author and readers instead of for profit. The increased interactivity and anonymity allows casual or hobby writers the opportunity not only to author their own stories but also to share them with a world-wide audience. Many authors adopt colorful pseudonyms and can develop cult followings within their genre, although a small number use their real names. Among transgender or non-binary authors, it is a common practice to adopt a feminine or masculine alter-ego, although a writer may use their own given name.

== See also ==
- Erotic literature
- Eroticism
- Erotica
