= Chipozi zhuan =

Chinese erotic novella

Inside pages from a copy of Chipozi zhuan from the Shanghai Library

Pages from a copy of Chipozi zhuan from the Harvard-Yenching Library

Chipozi zhuan (traditional Chinese: 癡婆子傳; simplified Chinese: 痴婆子传; pinyin: Chīpózi zhuàn), translated into English as The Story of the Foolish Woman, Biography of a Foolish Woman or A Tale of an Infatuated Woman, is a Chinese erotic novella written in the mid to late 16th-century during the Ming dynasty.

== Plot ==
Told through first-person narration, the novella recounts the sexual exploits of a septuagenarian named Shangguan E'Nuo (上官阿娜; "Graceful"), who at various points in her life has sex with numerous men including her cousin, her male servants, her husband, her two brothers-in-law (her husband's brothers), her father-in-law, a pair of Buddhist monks, her younger sister's husband (another brother-in-law) and an opera performer. At the age of 39, she met Gu Deyin, her son's new tutor, and soon fell in love with him. However, her "misdeeds" with the young man were exposed to her husband by her brothers-in-law and father-in-law (as well as by the various men around her who had sexual relations with her for many years). After being expelled from her husband's residence, she becomes a pariah and claims to have not had sex for three decades.

== Publication history ==
Chipozi zhuan was "compiled" or written by an anonymous writer using the pseudonym "Lotus Lord" or "Madame Hibiscus" (芙蓉主人) and edited by a "Passion-Infatuated Philosopher" (情痴子). It was composed in Classical Chinese during the mid- to late sixteenth century, at about the same time that Jin Ping Mei was published. At just over 10,000 Chinese characters, Chipozi zhuan is technically a novella. Chipozi zhuan was evidently in circulation before 1612, because it is mentioned in a preface to the novel Dong Xi Jin yanyi (东西晋演义; The Romance of the Eastern and Western Jin) that was published in that year. It was constantly banned after its publication for being a "lascivious and obscene work", and the earliest existing edition of the text dates to 1764.

== Literary significance and reception ==
According to Paola Zamperini, Chipozi zhuan is "seen as one of the first pornographic sources within the history of Chinese literature". Alongside Ruyijun zhuan (如意君傳; The Lord of Perfect Satisfaction) and Xiuta yeshi (繡榻野史; The Embroidered Couch), Chipozi zhuan is one of the three erotic works referenced in The Carnal Prayer Mat, which is believed to have been written by Qing dynasty writer Li Yu. Wu Cuncun states that Chipozi zhuan "can be regarded as an early representative work in narrating a series of sexual adventures of a woman from an unexceptional and relatively modest urban household." The novella also uses a first-person female narrator, which is described by Zamperini as "a very rare event ... (that) breaks strikingly with both previous and later narrative modes and models."

Because of the writer's pseudonym, there has long been doubts and discussion on the author's gender. Rick W.L. Guisso and Lenny Hu view that Chipozi zhuan might be "the earliest work of erotica in world literary history" by a female writer.

Martin W. Huang writes that the novella should be considered as one of the earliest fictional works published in China to champion "feminine authority", in that the protagonist E'Nuo is "not only a desiring subject but ... also a speaking subject, who had the discursive power to define and interpret her own subjectivity." In dissent, Hoi Yan Chu argues that Chipozi zhuan "is illusory and constructed based on a male perspective" and whose "patriarchy implications are mainly shown in its triple denial to female desire through showing female unsuccessful attempts to actively pursue sexual pleasure, emphasizing passivity as the only way for female sexual pleasure and punishing females."
