= Crisis and Transformation in Seventeenth-Century China =

Crisis and Transformation in Seventeenth-Century China: Society, Culture, and Modernity in Li Yü's World
- Author: Chun-shu Chang and Shelley Hsueh-lun Chang
- Subject: History of China
- Publisher: University of Michigan Press
- Publication date: 1992
- Publication place: United States
- Media type: Print
- Pages: 472
- ISBN: 0-472-10255-9

Crisis and Transformation in Seventeenth-Century China: Society, Culture, and Modernity in Li Yü's World is a 1992 book written by Chun-shu Chang and Shelley Hsueh-lun Chang about the transition in seventeenth-century China from the Ming dynasty to the Qing as viewed from a scholar living during the transition, Li Yu. The book discusses the state, society, and culture of the time by examining Li Yu's life and writings. The book received Choice's Outstanding Academic Title Award in 1998.

== Background ==
Chun-shu Chang is a professor of History at the University of Michigan and has written numerous publications on the history of China.

== Conclusions ==
Resulting from 20 years of work, Crisis and Transformation presents different conclusions about the seventeenth-century Chinese scholar Li Yu than were previously recorded by Patrick Hanan in his 1988 biographical study, The Invention of Li Yu. Chang and Chang conclude that the erotic novel The Carnal Prayer Mat was not authored by Li Yu as was previously suggested by Patrick Hanan. The Changs also accepted Li Yu as the author of the historical study Gujin Shilue (Outline of History), while Hanan had stated that the work was "fake". The difference this makes in the historical view of Li Yu is that he was seen by Hanan as a blithe, artful writer but by the Changs as a more staid scholar.

== Reception ==
Crisis and Transformation received Choice's Outstanding Academic Title Award in 1998, an award given to select academic books that were reviewed by Choice in the previous year. In his review for the journal Chinese Literature: Essays, Articles, Reviews, Robert E. Hegel wrote that the volume is a "essential source of information" for students studying the development of seventeenth century fiction and theater.
