= The Imperial Granary =

The Imperial Granary (Chinese: 皇家粮仓; Chinese: 皇家糧倉; pinyin: Huángjiāliángcāng) is an ancient storehouse as old as the Forbidden City, which has witnessed the reign of 24 emperors, from the Ming Dynasty to the Qing Dynasty, and seen the entire capital history from the time of the Republic of China and subsequent history to the present. It is the imperial storehouse that has survived the ravages of time on the largest scale, and is the one with the most intact current condition. As the terminal of the Grand Canal, the Imperial Granary (Nanxincang) will be selected into the list of China Cultural Heritage.

== Architecture ==
The Imperial Granary faces towards south. It is 22.9m in width, 16.9m in depth, 9.9m in height and occupies 500 square metres, supported by 8 columns dating back to Ming dynasty reinforced with modern steel. The wall is 1.5m in thickness. The Granary serves as crop storage for the imperial household and the royal guards and thus is built in the class of military defence, which ensures its endurance. Furthermore, the Granary employs state-of-the-art ecological technology of ancient China. Location on a higher terrain enables efficient drainage underground while the thick wall with vent guarantees nice draught and consistency in room temperature.

== History ==
In 1409, The Imperial Granary rebuilt in to replace the Yuan Dynasty structure initially in its place.

In 2001 the structure was granted the title of Key Cultural Relics of the State.

From 2007, the Granary hosts private events and Kunqu performances which including The Peony Pavilion and The Fragrant Companion.
