= Meditation Upon a Broomstick =

Book by Jonathan Swift

A Meditation Upon a Broomstick is a short satire and parody written by Jonathan Swift in 1701. It was first published by Edmund Curll in 1710, against Swift's wishes.

The book is a parody of Robert Boyle's meditations and their religious themes. Swift's meditations on the fate of men are intentionally nihilistic.

== Origins ==
The satire's origins lie in Swift's time at Moor Park, Surrey, when he acted as Secretary to William Temple. While in the household, Swift would read passages from Robert Boyle's Occasional Reflections upon Several Subjects (1665) for the young Esther Johnson ("Stella" to Swift).

Boyle's Reflections took the form of meditations on everyday subjects, where they were likened to religious themes. Boyle would consider a fire, or house cleaning, and see in it a reflection of God's relationship to man, or man to his soul. These reflections were very popular in the Temple household. One day, Swift, being bored with the predictability of Boyle's points, wrote his own Meditation and put it into the book. When the time came to read for the day, he read, instead of Boyle, his own Meditation Upon a Broomstick. The ladies of the house did not catch on until near the end of the meditation that it was absurd.

Swift later wrote up the one-page Meditation in a more formal manner.

== Publication ==
Edmund Curll, in an attempt to antagonize and siphon off money from Swift, published it in 1710 from a manuscript stolen from Swift (which forced Swift to publish a corrected and authorized version that he also had to write from memory).

== Style of the work ==
To get a flavor of the Meditation, consider the last paragraph:

But a Broom-stick, perhaps you'll say, is an Emblem of a Tree standing on its Head; and pray what is Man, but a Topsy-turvy Creature, his Animal Faculties perpetually mounted on his Rational; His Head where his Heels should be; groveling on the Earth, and yet with all his Faults, he sets up to be a universal Reformer and Corrector of Abuses, a Remover of Grievances, rakes into every Slut's Corner of Nature, bringing hidden Corruptions to the Light, and raises a mighty Dust where there was none before, sharing deeply all the while, in the very same Pollutions he pretends to sweep away: His last Days are spent in Slavery to Women, and generally the least deserving; 'till worn to the Stumps, like his Brother Bezom, he's either kicked out of Doors, or made use of to kindle Flames, for others to warm Themselves by.

The Meditation begins with a rational moral comparison and proceeds to a frenzy of increasingly unlikely comparisons. While the satire begins with a pitch-perfect imitation of the kindly Boyle's tone, it ends in a frantic, misanthropic and misogynistic note of despair and nihilism. While it begins with a hopeful call to self-examination, it moves eventually into a condemnation of all efforts at improvement.
