= Merryland =

The Merryland books were a genre of English 17th and 18th century erotic fiction in which the female body was described in terms of a topographical metaphor derived from a pun on Maryland. Four of the titles were published by 18th century controversialist Edmund Curll (c. 1675–1747).

The earliest work in this genre seems to be Erotopolis: The Present State of Bettyland (1684) probably by Charles Cotton. This was included, in abbreviated form, in Curll's The Potent Ally: or Succours from Merryland (1741). Other works published by Curll include A New Description of Merryland. Containing a Topographical, Geographical and Natural History of that Country (1740) by Thomas Stretzer (whose name is sometimes given as "Stretser" and of whom nothing is known), Merryland Displayed (1741) and set of maps entitled A Compleat Set of Charts of the Coasts of Merryland (1745).

Stretzer's book was typical of the genre in depicting the female body as a landscape that men explore, till, and plow. For example, he writes: "Her valleys are like Eden, her hills like Lebanon, she is a paradise of pleasure and a garden of delight." Sometimes, the metaphor of female form equals landscape changes, but the objectification of the female body remains intact; only the image is changed, as when, for example, in another passage, the novel's narrator, Roger Pheuquewell, describes the uterus ("Utrs," as the author simply contracts vowels without graphical indication) as resembling "one of our common pint bottles, with the neck downwards." It is remarkable, he says, for expanding infinitely, the more it is filled, and contracting when there is no crop to hold. Similarly, in Charles Cotton's Erotopolis: The Present State of Bettyland, the female body is an island farmed by men.

Stretzer's book is dedicated to George Cheyne, who, at that time, would not be known for vegetarianism, but, rather, alleged deism. Merryland combines the traditional language of Song of Songs, the microcosm of classical education, and, most pointedly, the tropes of Book II of Jonathan Swift's Gulliver's Travels. In Book II, Gulliver reports that he was used in ways that a gentleman should not endure by the giant girls who undress in his presence. The erotic possibilities were dismissed in Swift's account, but Curll, who was an enemy of Swift's, would have quickly seen the pornographic possibilities, especially as he had already produced a "Key" to Gulliver and had attempted to siphon off Swift's sales. Curll's practice was to hire impoverished authors for commissioned works on pornography, and his stable of hired authors was substantial.

After Curll's death further books appeared by different authors, using a similar topographical metaphor for the female body. The last book in the genre is a parody of Laurence Sterne's A Sentimental Journey Through France and Italy (1768) entitled La Souriciere. The Mousetrap. A Facetious and Sentimental Excursion through part of Austrian Flanders and France (1794) by "Timothy Touchit".

== Modern editions ==
- Stretzer, Thomas. Merryland. Published by Robin Hood House, 1932.
- Merryland. In v.3 of Eighteenth-Century British Erotica, edited by Alexander Pettit and Patrick Spedding. London: Pickering and Chatto, 2002.
- Merryland. New York: Kessinger Publishing, 2003.
- Pheuquewell, Roger. Travels to Merryland. Published by Black Scat Books, Pocket Erotica series, 2020.
