= De Usu Flagrorum =

Treatise on sexual flogging by Heinrich Meibom

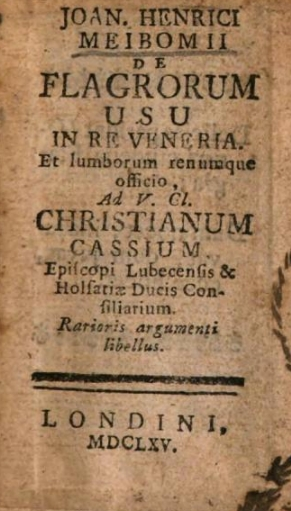
Title page of London edition of Meibomius De flagrorum usu, 1665

Tractus de usu flagrorum in re Medica et Veneria is a 1639 treatise by Henricus Meibomius (1590–1655). The English title is A Treatise on the Use of Flogging in Medicine and Venery. It was published by the English publisher Edmund Curll.

It is the earliest printed work on the subject, giving accounts of a number of examples. David Savran declared it was the authoritative text on the subject for two hundred years. In it the author, among other things, “rejoice[s]” to know that when someone doing flogging for sexual gratification was found in Germany, they would be burned alive.
