= Porn Art Movement =

Brazilian transgressive avant-garde movement

The Porn Art Movement (Movimento de Arte Pornô) was a transgressive Brazilian avant-garde movement that started in 1980 and ended in 1982. The movement took place under a military dictatorship and pioneered the use of pornography both as a form of political resistance and as an innovative art medium. The movement was formally experimental, politically progressive and socially non-normative. It used the word “porn” deliberately but it did not produce conventional pornography. Rather, it rejected erotica, which was accepted by the dictatorship, and subverted the logic of pornography to create social, political and aesthetic alternatives that employed humor, scatology, surprise, poetry, performance, body politics and pansexuality. Organized and coordinated activities ended in 1982, but isolated performances were realized and publications came out until 1984. The book Antolorgia, published in 1984, was the last publication of the movement.

== History ==
The Movimento de Arte Pornô (Porn Art Movement), also known as Poesia Pornô (Pornpoetry) or Pornismo (Pornism), was conceived by Eduardo Kac in January 1980 in Rio de Janeiro. Kac invited Cairo Trindade to develop the movement together and they launched it publicly on March 30, 1980, through their Ipanema Beach intervention called Pelo Topless Literário (Literary Topless). This was a sudden invasion of the beach's Lifeguard Post 9 (Posto Nove) with performances, poetry readings, demonstrations with banners featuring slogans, and distribution of publications. Lifeguard Post 9 was a strategic choice: it was considered at the time the epicenter of the beach (and, as a consequence, a major focal point of the city).

Soon after the Literary Topless intervention, Kac and Trindade invited Teresa Jardim to join them, thus forming the official performative arm of the movement, which they called Gang (The Gang). Braulio Tavares, Ana Miranda, Cynthia Dorneles and Sandra Terra also performed with The Gang.

Kac and Trindade wrote the Manifesto Pornô (Porn Manifesto) in May 1980 and first published it in the movement's zine Gang, n. 1, September 1980. The movement published a total of three editions of the Gang zine, in addition to chapbooks, stickers, t-shirts, prints, comics, artist's books and anthologies.

Between 1980 and 1982, every Friday night The Gang performed at Rio’s main square known as Cinelândia, a vibrant and busy area surrounded by the Municipal Theatre, the National Library, the Rio de Janeiro City Council and the National Museum of Fine Arts. In front of a public that mixed intellectuals and popular audiences, the Gang read out loud the Porn Manifesto on September 9, 1980. The selection of Cinelândia was also a strategic maneuver, since it is the heart of Rio de Janeiro.

On February 13, 1982, the Gang presented its last major public intervention, which took place in Ipanema Beach's Lifeguard Post 9. This event, which Kac considers the formal end of the movement, mobilized 9 performers, explored the entire repertoire developed during the preceding two years, included a wide array of props and publications, climaxed with a nude demonstration along the beach (which was and still is forbidden by law), mobilized public participation, and culminated with a collective dive in the ocean—a symbolic act meant to signify self-renewal, the beginning of a better path forward beyond the prevailing political and aesthetic conservatism.

The videographer Belisario Franca, then a photographer, accompanied The Gang between 1980 and 1982, producing photographic documentation of many of its interventions.

The Brazilian Porn Art Movement anticipated the international use of pornography as a critical and imaginative art form, as later seen in the work of Jeff Koons, Annie Sprinkle, Sue Williams, Santiago Sierra, Shu Lea Cheang, Wim Delvoye and the artists featured in the 2006 DVD compilation entitled Destricted.

The movement started to be rediscovered in 2010, when the Laura Marsiaj Gallery, in Rio de Janeiro, exhibited Eduardo Kac's series entitled Pornogramas (Pornograms), developed by the artist between 1980 and 1982. The first museum exhibition of the Brazilian Porn Art Movement took place at the Reina Sofía Museum, in Madrid, in the context of the group show Losing the Human Form, realized in October 2012. The museum published a catalogue that features the movement.

== Main participants ==
- Eduardo Kac
- Cairo Trindade
- Teresa Jardim
- Glauco Mattoso
- Braulio Tavares
- Cynthia Dorneles
- Hudinilson Jr.
- Leila Míccolis
- Ota
- Siegbert Franklin
- Alberto Harrigan
- Hélio Lete (Hélio Leites)

== Art forms ==
The Porn Art Movement produced work in a variety of media, including performance, poetry, graffiti, drawing, photography, cartoon and the graphic arts. Glauco Mattoso created an innovative form that he called Jornal Dobrabil, a self-printed double-sided sheet designed entirely on a typewriter that was visually provocative and mixed indiscriminately classic, experimental and popular pornographic material. Hudinilson Jr. created a visual vocabulary based on his systematic sampling of his own body through reprographic media, notably the photocopier. Leila Míccolis, Teresa Jardim and Cynthia Dorneles developed their respective poetic voices through a form of feminism that combined unabashed pornography and liberal political positions. Ota produced invitations, posters, cartoons and comics through which he advanced the movement's agenda while inviting the movement's participants and the public to laugh. The poetry of Braulio Tavares and the drawings of Siegbert Franklin were also significant contributions to the movement. Publicly forging a new subjectivity, Eduardo Kac wore a pink mini-skirt in his daily life. Kac also developed the innovative series entitled Pornograms, hybrid of body art, design, political resistance, performance, publishing, activism, photography and poetry. In this series Kac uses photography to explore the possibilities of writing with the body and writing the body itself. Kac included two Pornograms in his artist's book Escracho, which he published in 1983.
