= Whore dialogues =

Literary device and genre of erotic fiction

Whore dialogues are a literary genre of the Renaissance and the Enlightenment and a type of erotic fiction. The first example was the Ragionamenti by Pietro Aretino, followed by such works as La Retorica delle Puttane (The Whores' Rhetoric) (1642) by Ferrante Pallavicino; L'École des Filles (The School for Girls) (1655), attributed to Michel Millot and Jean L'Ange and also known as The School of Venus; The Dialogues of Luisa Sigea (c. 1660) by Nicolas Chorier—known also as A Dialogue between a Married Woman and a Maid in various editions. Such works typically concerned the sexual education of a naïve young woman by an experienced older woman and often included elements of philosophising, medical folklore, satire and anti-clericalism. The later works in this genre, such as that by Chorier, indulge in a more sophisticated type of sexual fantasy and are the precursors of the more explicit pornography which followed in Europe.

== Individual works ==
In Aretino's Ragionamenti the sex lives of wives, whores and nuns are compared and contrasted. Later works in the same genre include La Retorica delle Puttane (The Rhetoric of Whores) (1642) by Ferrante Pallavicino; L'Escole des Filles (The school for girls) (1655), attributed to Michel Millot and Jean L'Ange. and The Dialogues of Luisa Sigea (c. 1660) by Nicolas Chorier. Such works typically concerned the sexual education of a naive younger woman by an experienced older woman and often included elements of philosophising, satire and anti-clericalism. Donald Thomas has translated L'École des filles, as The School of Venus, (1972), described on its back cover as "both an uninhibited manual of sexual technique and an erotic masterpiece of the first order". In his diary Samuel Pepys records reading and (in an often censored passage) masturbating over this work. Chorier's Dialogues of Luisa Sigea goes a bit further than its predecessors in this genre and has the older female giving practical instruction of a lesbian nature to the younger woman plus recommending the spiritual and erotic benefits of a flogging from willing members of the holy orders. This work was translated into many languages under various titles, appearing in English as A Dialogue between a Married Woman and a Maid in various editions. The School of Women first appeared as a work in Latin entitled Aloisiae Sigaeae, Toletanae, Satyra sotadica de arcanis Amoris et Veneris. This manuscript claimed that it was originally written in Spanish by Luisa Sigea de Velasco, an erudite poet and maid of honor at the court of Lisbon and was then translated into Latin by Johannes Meursius. The attribution to Sigea and of the translation to Meursius were later considered a complete fabrication; it is believed that the true author is Nicolas Chorier.
