= Flossie, a Venus of Fifteen =

English erotic novel

- Author: Anonymous
- Language: English
- Genre: Erotic fiction
- Published: 1897

Flossie, a Venus of Fifteen is an English erotic novel, first published in 1897.

== Synopsis ==
The novel recounts the adventures of an immature young person of distinct cockney type, who begins to sexually satisfy older males at a very early age, and manages to retain her physical virginity until the last few pages. According to the publisher Charles Carrington, "The book has no other pretension than to be thoroughly obscene".

== Publication ==
The first edition was printed at Amsterdam for the author in the latter half of the year 1897:

Social Studies of the Century: Flossie, a Venus of Fifteen by one who knew this charming Goddess and Worshipped at her Shrine. Printed at Carnopolis for the delectation of the amorous and the instruction of the amateur in the year of excitement of the sexes: MDCCCXCVII. Large 8vo.

The first and limited edition was soon sold out, but it was immediately reprinted, "for the Erotica Biblion Society of London and New York", n.d. (Paris, 1898), small 12mo. of 122 pages, and there were two or three more re-issues by 1902. The work is sometimes attributed to Algernon Charles Swinburne.

== Censorship ==
The book was published privately and anonymously with misleading notices: "Printed at Carnopolis" (1897), and "Printed for the Erotica Biblion Society Society of London and New York" (1898); no doubt to confuse the authorities, as such works were illegal and publishers and booksellers were often prosecuted.

On 19 April 1933, London bookseller William Hamilton, charged with selling two obscene books described only as "absolute filth", was sentenced to 3 months' imprisonment in the second division and fined £100 and 10 guineas costs. The works in question, described by the Magistrate as the worst that could be imagined, were Flossie and The Autobiography of a Flea.

== See also ==
- Obscene Publications Acts
- Pornotopia

== Sources ==
- Druce, Robert (1995). "Pulex Defixus, or, the Spellbound Flea: An Excursion Into Porno-Gothic". In Tinkler-Villani, Valeria; Davidson, Peter; Stevenson, Jane (eds.). Exhibited by Candlelight: Sources and Developments in the Gothic Tradition. Brill. pp. 221–242. ISBN 978-90-04-49011-6, 978-90-5183-832-9, 978-90-5183-828-2.
- Larsson, Mariah (2007). "Drömmen om den goda pornografin. Om sextio-och sjuttiotalsfilmen och gränsen mellan konst och pornografi". Tidskrift för genusvetenskap, no. 1–2. pp. 31–111.
- Thomas, Donald (1969). A Long Time Burning: The History of Literary Censorship in England. New York and Washington: Frederick A. Praeger. p. 284.

Attribution:

- Carrington, John ["An Old Bibliophile"] (1902). Forbidden Books: Notes and Gossip on Tabooed Literature. Paris: For the Author and his Friends. pp. 140–145.
