= L'Escole des Filles =

1655 French erotic text

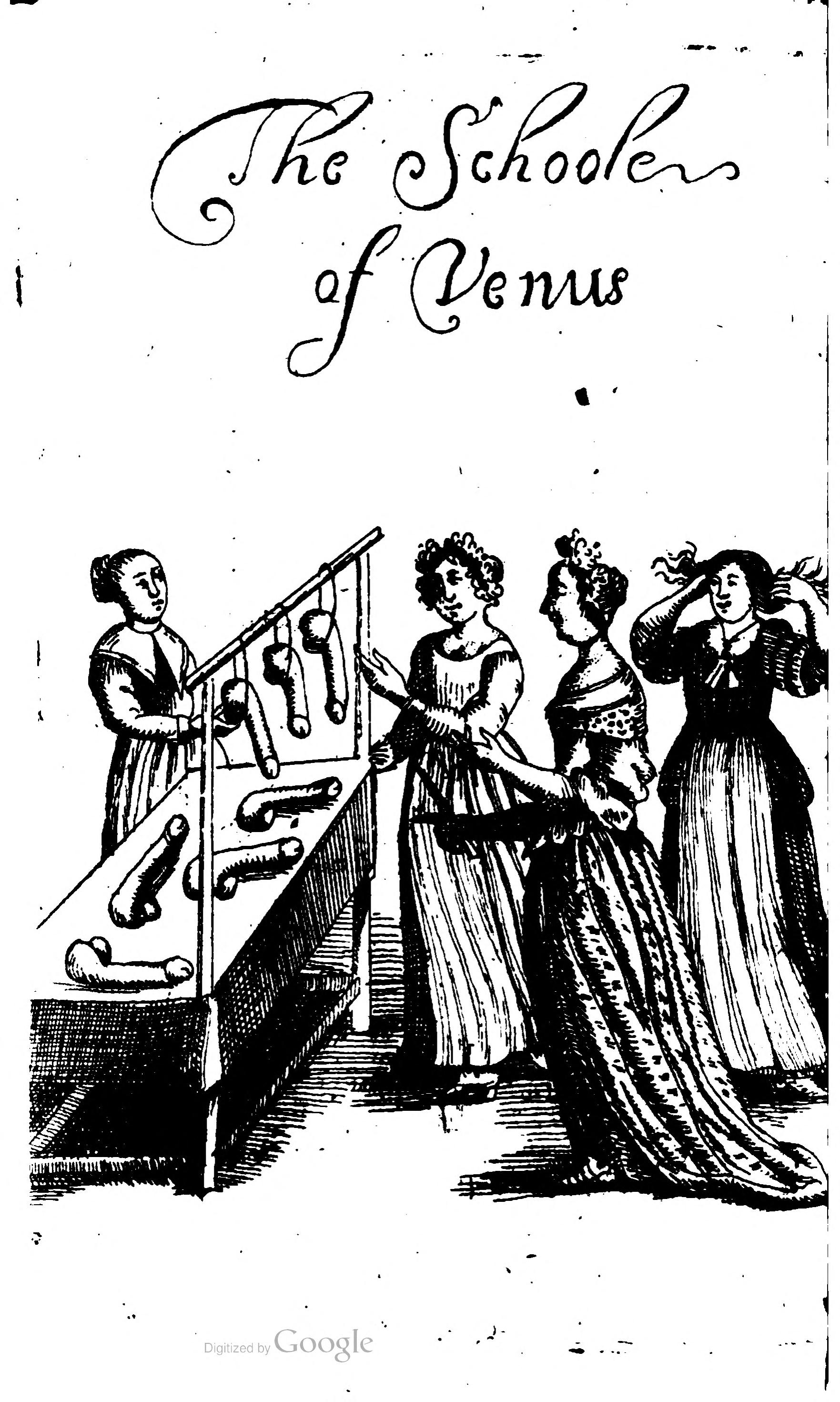
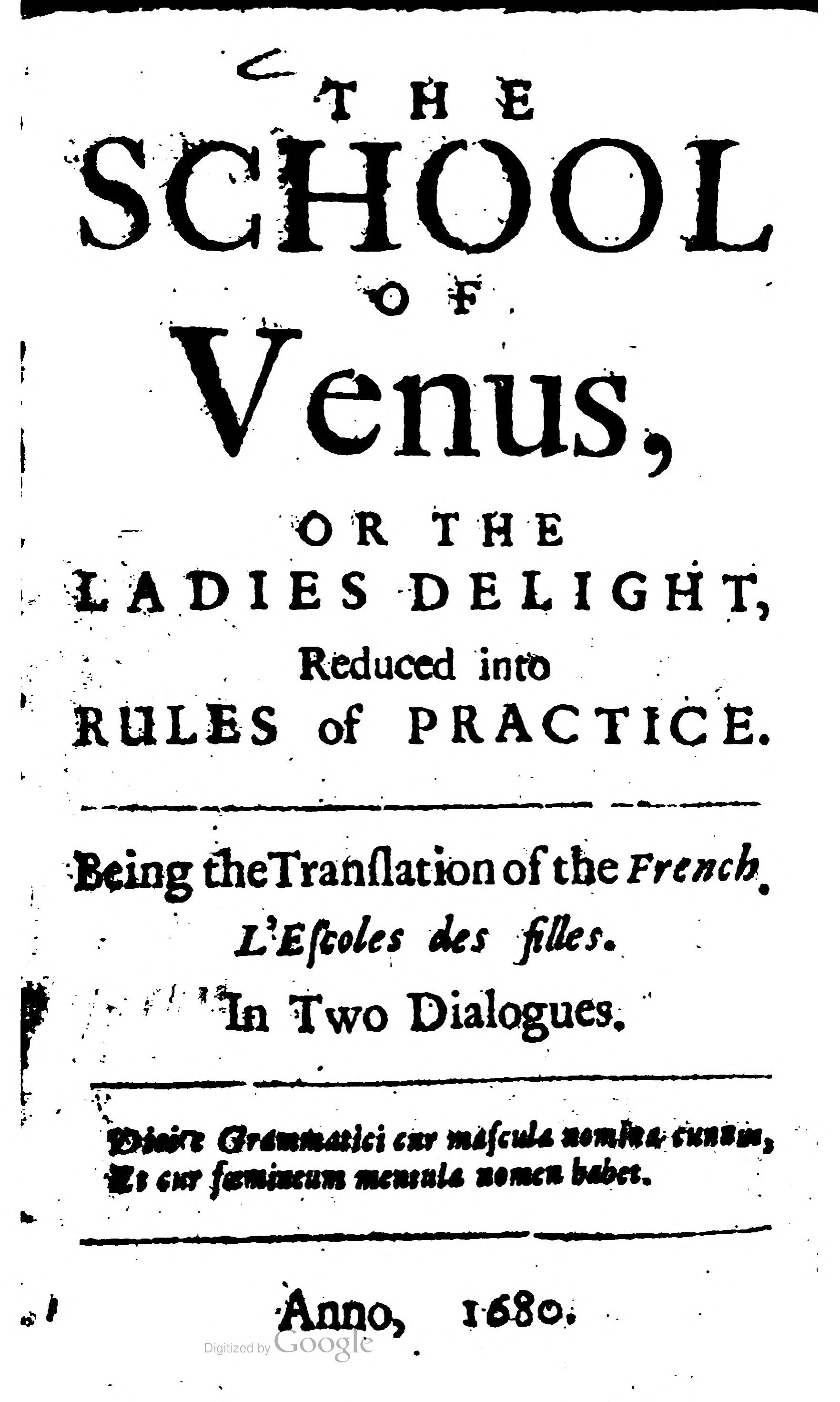
Frontispiece and title page of the English edition, 1680

L'Escole des Filles, ou la Philosophie des dames (lit. 'The School for Girls, or the Philosophy of Ladies'), known in English as The School of Venus, is an early work of erotica in French. Published anonymously in 1655 in Paris, later editions sometimes ascribe it to M[ichel] Millilot (Note: Variously spelt 'Millilot', 'Mililot', and 'Millot'.) and Jean L'Ange. In this work considered as the first novel on libertinism and the first erotic novel in French literature, two cousins discuss sexual topics.

The novel has a small cast and a relatively simple plot. A trader's son has fallen for the virgin girl Fanchon, but he considers her unapproachable. Fanchon's older cousin Susanne is asked to enlighten the younger girl on sexual matters and to kindle Fanchon's lust. After Fanchon willingly lets the man deflower her, she describes the experience to Susanne. The two cousins then have a discussion about sexual topics, including which methods of birth control are available to them.

The French novel circulated in England. The English diarist Samuel Pepys recorded that he masturbated to this novel. The first known English translation appeared in 1680, while Edmund Curll produced his own translation c. 1728.

== Characters ==
- Robinet (Mr. Roger)
- Franchon (Katherine = Katy)
- Susanne (Frances = Frank)

== Synopsis ==
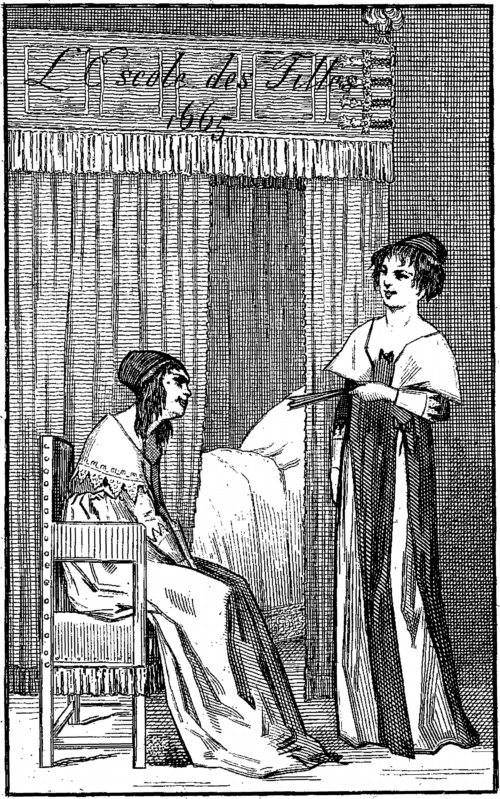
Frontispiece of a 19th-century reprint of the Dutch counterfeit edition of 1668

The work takes the form of two dialogues in which two cousins discuss sexual topics. In a summary, which precedes the two dialogues, the circumstances of the plot are briefly described. Robinet, the son of a trader, is in love with a young girl named Fanchon, but because of her naivety he is unable to approach her. He therefore convinces Fanchon's older cousin Susanne to enlighten her through a trusting conversation and at the same time to kindle her lust.

In the course of their conversation, Susanne and Fanchon discuss a variety of topics, such as the age of marriage, the male and female sex organs, and sexual intercourse. At the end of the first dialogue, Fanchon agrees to let Robinet deflower her.

The second dialogue takes place a few days later. When asked by Susanne, Fanchon gives a detailed account of her first intercourse with Robinet. The two women address other topics including sex positions, flagellation, penis sizes, birth control and marriage.

== Reception ==
In his diary Samuel Pepys records reading and (in an often censored passage) masturbating over this work. The work was translated anonymously into English as The School of Venus, or the Ladies Delight (1680). The London bookseller Edmund Curll was prosecuted in 1728 for producing an English translation. More recently, Donald Thomas has translated L'Escole des Filles into modern English; he describes the original as "both an uninhibited manual of sexual technique and an erotic masterpiece of the first order".

== See also ==
- Whore dialogues

== Sources ==
- Greenberg, Mitchell (2001). Baroque Bodies: Psychoanalysis and the Culture of French Absolutism. Ithaca, NY: Cornell University Press. ISBN 0-8014-3807-1. pp. 78–79.
- Muchembled, Robert (2008). Orgasm and the West: A History of Pleasure from the 16th century to the Present. ISBN 0-7456-3876-7. Polity. p. 90.
- Hyde, Harford Montgomery (1964). A History of Pornography. London: Heinemann. pp. 19, 155.
- Suarez, Michael F.; Woudhuysen, H. R., eds. (2010). "Pornography". In The Oxford Companion to the Book. Oxford University Press. ISBN 9780198606536.
- Thomas, Donald, ed. (1971). The School of Venus. New American Library (Panther, 1972). ISBN 0-586-03674-1.
