= Lü Tiancheng =

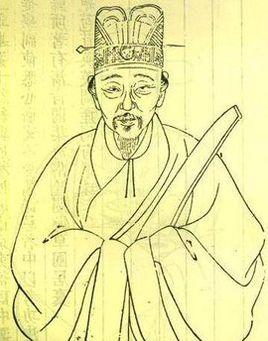
- Born: 1580
- Died: 1618 (aged 37–38)
- Occupations: Playwright; poet

Lü Tiancheng (Chinese: 呂天成; pinyin: Lǚ Tiānchéng; Wade–Giles: Lü T’ien-ch’eng; 1580–1618) was a Chinese playwright and poet active during the late Ming dynasty.

== Career ==
Lü is widely believed to be the author of the erotic novel Xiuta yeshi (繡榻野史) or The Embroidered Couch, which he reportedly wrote as a teenager. According to his friend and a contemporary drama critic, Wang Jide (王驥德), Lü also wrote another romantic novel titled Xianqing biezhuan (閒情別傳) "for fun". Having adapted several dramas including Romance of the Western Chamber and Story of a White Rabbit, Lü himself was also a drama critic. His seminal 1613 work Qu Pin (曲品) or Opera Studies comprises some ninety biographies of playwrights, alongside commentaries on notable plays from the Yuan dynasty to the Ming dynasty; according to the Historical Dictionary of Chinese Theater, Qu Pin is "one of the most influential books on the variety opera, the Southern opera, the legend, and the Kun opera."
