= Venus in India =

Book by Charles Devereaux

Venus in India, or Love adventures in Hindustan is a pornographic novel by the pseudonymous "Charles Deve(u)re(a)ux" (variously spelled in the different editions; the very first one has "Deveureux") published by Auguste Brancart in Brussels in 1889. It purports to be the autobiography of a British Army officer serving on the North West Frontier of India, describing his erotic adventures with Lizzie Wilson and the three daughters of Colonel Selwyn. His wife Louie remains in England. He sometimes refers to Théophile Gautier's Mademoiselle de Maupin during the narrative which is set during the third Afghan War. It is divided into two volumes and the content of a third volume is occasionally referred to in the text but this was never published. The real author is thought to be Major Crommelin Henry Ricketts, who retired from the 5th Cavalry (Madras Staff) in 1871 after 21 years' service.
