= Langshi =

Late-Ming anonymous Chinese novel

The beginning of chapter one of Langshi, where it quotes the poem Sui Gong by the poet Li Shangyin

Inside pages from volume one of Langshi

Langshi (Chinese: 浪史; pinyin: Làng Shǐ), (Note: Also published under the titles Langshi qiguan (浪史奇觀), Qiaoyinyuan (巧姻缘), and Meimengyuan (梅夢緣), and translated into English as The Story of The Libertine, Tales from a Life of Indulgence, or A History of Debauchery.) translated into English as A History of Debauchery and several other titles, is a Chinese novel composed during the late Ming dynasty by an anonymous writer under a pseudonym. Believed to be one of the oldest erotic novels published in China, Langshi revolves around the scholar Langzi (浪子), who is described as adept in seducing others. The novel has been constantly banned or censored since its publication.

== Synopsis ==
Divided into forty "episodes" or chapters, the novel follows the adventures of a young scholar named Langzi (浪子; "The Rake") as he seduces his female and male lovers. After "achieving ultimate sexual gratification", Langzi ascends to heaven and becomes a Taoist immortal.

== Publication history ==
Langshi was written by an anonymous writer under the pseudonym "Youxuan zi of Wind and Moon Studio" (風月軒又玄子著) in the late Tianqi era. One of the earliest mentions of the novel is in the preface of the novel Tianxu zhai pidian Bei Song san Sui pingyao zhuan (天許齋批點北宋三遂平妖傳), dated 1620. The novel is also "presumably" mentioned in the preface of The Three Sui Quash the Demons' Revolt as expanded by Feng Menglong in the 1620s. Alongside Jin Ping Mei (金瓶梅) and Xiuta yeshi (繡榻野史), both also written during the late Ming dynasty, Langshi is believed to be one of the oldest erotic novels published in China.

== Reception and legacy ==
Cuncun Wu and Mark Stevenson argue that Langshi "represents a complete abnegation of any form of moral standpoint" and "lacks even the slightest hint of moral didacticism or contrition, and instead parodies moral conventions by upending them". Furthermore, they claim that "in the history of the Chinese novel there are few works that can match Langshi in ... being devoid of any suggestion of a moral causality."

Martin W. Huang writes that Langshi is an example of "erotic fiction as a transgressive genre (that) seems occasionally to have offered more latitude for viewing deviations, especially those committed by women, with more tolerance." For instance, Mei Suxian makes the "feminist" gesture of allowing his wife Li Wenfei to have sex with his servant and bisexual lover Lu Shu, because she allowed her husband to keep a concubine. The early Qing dynasty commentator Liu Tingji (劉廷璣) attacks the novel as "poison", while Giovanni Vitiello criticises the book for being "rather poor in plot and repetitive in style".
