= Olga Savary =

Brazilian writer (1933–2020)

- Born: May 21, 1933 Belém, Pará, Rep. of the United States of Brazil
- Died: May 15, 2020 (aged 86) Teresópolis, RJ, Brazil
- Occupation: Writer, translator, journalist
- Genre: Novel, short story, poetry
- Literary movement: Postmodernism
- Notable awards: Prêmio Jabuti (1971); Associação Paulista de Críticos de Arte Prize (1977, 2008)

Olga Savary (21 May 1933 – 15 May 2020) was a Brazilian writer, poet, and literary critic.

== Biography ==
Savary's mother, Célia Nobre de Almeida, was born in Pará, and her father, Bruno, was a Russian engineer. She spent her childhood in Belém, Monte Alegre, Fortaleza, and Rio de Janeiro. Her parents separated in 1942 and Savary went to Rio de Janeiro to live with her uncle. Here, she discovered her love of writing, although her mother preferred for her a musical career. She hid her writings, and they were kept by a friend at the Brazilian Press Association.

Savary studied at the Colégio Moderno in Belém. Afterwards, she returned to Rio de Janeiro and continued her career. She wrote several publications and was a member of PEN International. Notably, she won the Prêmio Jabuti in 1970 for Espelho Provisório.

== Death ==
Olga Savary died on 15 May 2020 in Teresópolis at the age of 86 due to COVID-19.

== Publications ==
- Espelho Provisório (1970)
- Sumidouro (1977)
- Altaonda (1979)
- Magma (1982)
- Natureza Viva (1982)
- Hai-Kais (1986)
- Linha d'água (1987)
- Berço Esplendido (1987)
- Retratos (1989)
- Rudá (1994)
- Éden Hades (1994)
- Morte de Moema (1996)
- Anima Animalis (1996)
- O Olhar Dourado do Abismo (1997)
- Repertório Selvagem (1998)
