= Glauco Mattoso =

Brazilian writer and poet

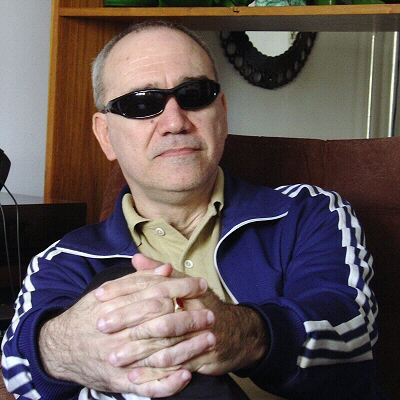
- Glauco Mattoso, in 2004
- Born: Pedro José Ferreira da Silva; 29 June 1951 (age 75); São Paulo, São Paulo, Brazil
- Occupations: Poet, writer, ficcionist, novelist, essayist, translator, songwriter

Pedro José Ferreira da Silva (São Paulo, 29 June 1951), known as Glauco Mattoso, is a poet, writer, novelist, essayist, translator and songwriter from Brazil.

== Career ==
In the 1970s, he participated in the cultural resistance to the military dictatorship through the group of Poesia Marginal. In addition to editing the poetic-pamphlet fanzine Jornal Dobrabil, he collaborated in several alternative press periodicals, such as the gay tabloid Lampião and the humorous newspaper O Pasquim.

In the 1980s, he published works in magazines such as Chiclete com Banana, Tralha, Mil Perigos, SomTrês, Top Rock, Status and Around, essays and literary criticism in Jornal da Tarde, as well as several volumes of poetry and prose. In 1982, he edited the Dedo Mingo magazine as a supplement to the Jornal Dobrabil. With his pornographic poetry, he joined the Porn Art Movement.

In the 1990s, glaucoma cost him his vision. He left behind his graphics work (comic strip and concrete poetry) to dedicate himself to song lyrics and to phonographic production. In 1999, with Jorge Schwartz, he won the Jabuti Prize for his translation of the inaugural work of Jorge Luis Borges, Fervor de Buenos Aires.

In 2015, Glauco Mattoso won the third place in the Oceanos Prize with the work "The First History of the World and Saccola de Feira"

== Anterior orthography to 1911 ==
Glauco Mattoso frequently uses the anterior orthography to 1911 in words as "kilômetro", "menarcha", "pharmácia" and others. His orthography is called "etymological orthography".

== Books ==
- Memórias de um Pueteiro (1982)
- Línguas na Papa (1982)
- O Calvário dos Carecas: História do Trote Estudantil (1985)
- Rockabillyrics (1988)
- Limeiriques & Outros Debiques Glauquianos (1989)
- Haicais Paulistanos (1992)
- Galeria Alegria (2002)
- O Glosador Motejoso (2003)
- Animalesca Escolha (2004)
- Pegadas Noturnas: Dissonetos Barrockistas (2004)
- Poética na Política (2004)
- Poesia Digesta: 1974-2004 (2004)
- A Planta da Donzela (2005)
- A Aranha Punk (2007)
- A Letra da Ley (2008)
- O Cancioneiro Carioca e Brasileiro (2008)
- Contos Hediondos (2009)
- Cinco Ciclos e Meio Século (2009)
- Tripé do Tripúdio e Outros Contos Hediondos (2011)
- Raymundo Curupyra, O Caypora: Romance Lyrico (2012)
- Cautos Causos (2012)
- Outros Cautos Causos (2012)
- Sacola de Feira (2014)
- Poesia Vaginal: Cem Sonnettos Sacanas (2015)
- Curso de Refeologia (2018)
