= Vinni Corrêa =

Brazilian writer (born 1981)

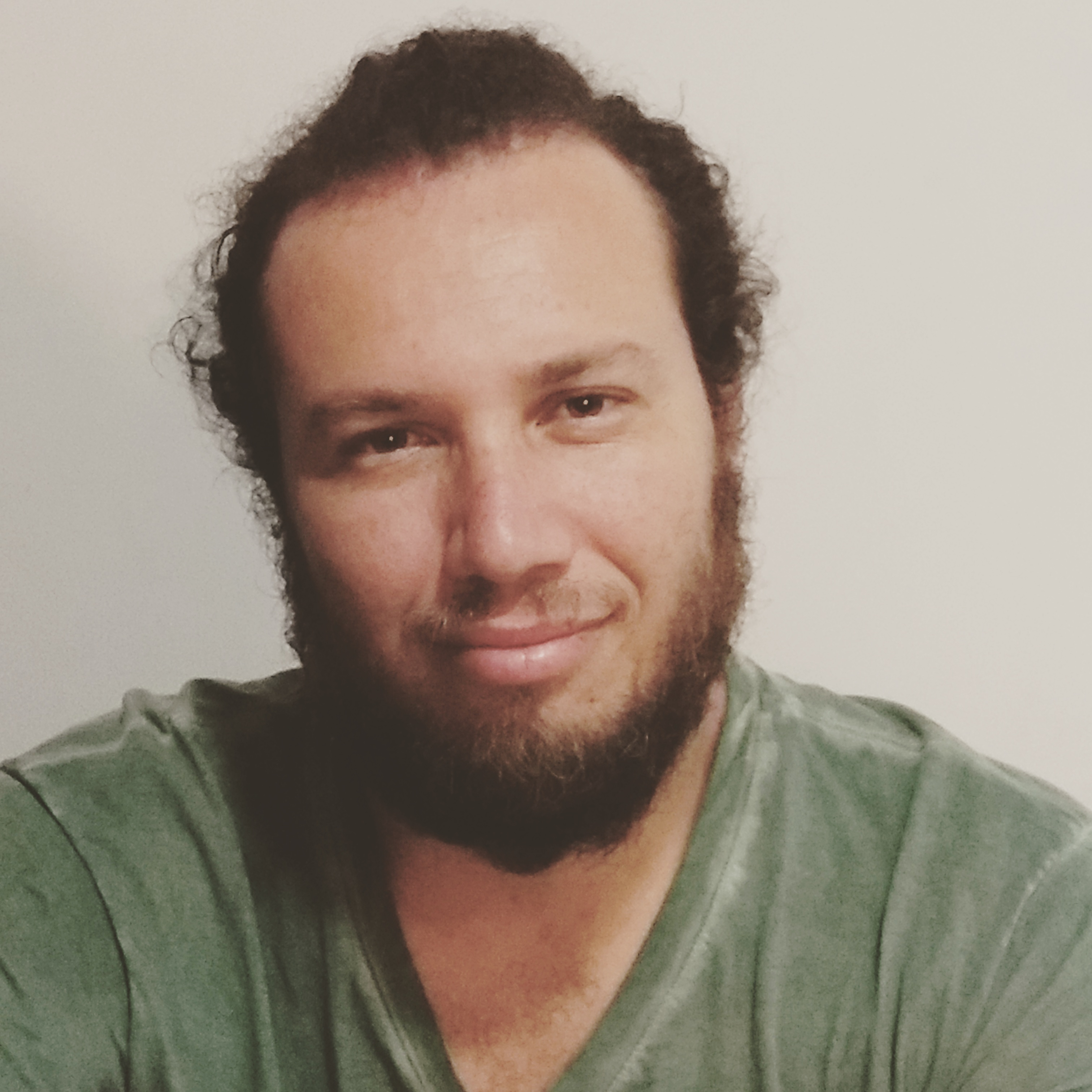
- Corrêa in 2018
- Born: 1981 (age 44–45); Rio de Janeiro, Brazil
- Writing career
- Genre: Erotic poetry
- Subjects: Sex, eroticism
- Website: Official website

Vinni Corrêa (born 1981 in Rio de Janeiro) is a Brazilian poet, visual artist, and erotologist.

== Career ==
In 2012, for the release of his first book Coma de 4, he created the erotic poetry event Fresta Literária - sarrau de poesia erótica with the support of the poet Cairo Trindade, bringing together poets and artists of Rio's eroticism. The event has already been the subject of the program Penetra, on Canal Sexy Hot, and of the documentary Sex in The World's Cities for the French cable channel Paris Première. He is the author of four books of erotic poetry: Coma de 4 (2012); Literatura de Bordel (2015); Lunch Box (2015); Sexo a Três (2018) and Com Mamas na Língua (2025). In comedy, the poet wrote some texts for the Sensationalista website and participated in some episodes of the Minuto de Silêncio podcast.

The 5th edition of the Literary Festival, in 2014, was the event with the greatest participation of artists, with presentations by Cairo and Denizis Trindade, Cynthia Dorneles, Sady Bianchin, Dalberto Gomes, Tanussi Cardoso, Jorge Ventura, Ricardo Ruiz, Zuza Zapata and many others.

In 2018, the poet participated in several events for the release of his book Sexo a Três, such as the 18th edition of Primavera Literária, at the Museu da República, in Rio de Janeiro. The book brought great repercussion in Brazilian erotic literature, especially among the female audience.

Vinni Corrêa also began to develop visual poems called "animaverbivocovisualidade" by Antonio Miranda, professor and researcher of Communication Science. After that, his work took on a visual poetics, specializing in collage and street art. Vinni Corrêa's porn art is centered on the body as an object. In his series entitled Uncyborg Sutra, the artist assembles new bodies by mixing flesh and everyday tools.

In 2018, Vinni Corrêa started a movement against the censorship of erotic art images on social networks such as Facebook and Instagram. Under the name Obscenografica, the artist brought together several other artists, including poets, cartoonists, illustrators and photographers from Brazil and other countries in an online magazine. The second edition was published in 2021, showing artists from around the world.

== Bibliography ==
Poetry

- Coma de 4 (2012)
- Literatura de Bordel (2015)
- Lunch Box (2015)
- Sexo a Três (2018)
- Com Mamas na Língua (2025)

Anthologies

- A Palavra em Prisma: antologia VI (São Paulo: Via Lettera, 2008)
- Antologia de Poetas Brasileiros Contemporâneos (Salvador: Clube dos Autores, 2013 – Org. Elenílson Nascimento)
- II Antologia de Poetas Brasileiros Contemporâneos (Salvador: Clube dos Autores, 2013 – Org. Elenílson Nascimento)
- MEGA: antologia da oficina literária Cairo Trindade (Rio de Janeiro: Personal, 2014 – Org. Cairo Trindade)
- Grandes Poetas do Século XXI: o livro oficial do Sarau Poesia & Arte (Rio de Janeiro: Illuminare, 2016 – Org. Leandro Ervilha e Marcio Muniz)
- Antologia Ruínas (São Paulo: Editora Patuá, 2020 - Org. Eduardo Lacerda)
- Fio Arte Erótica: homenagem aos saraus D4 e Dark Room Poético (Rio de Janeiro: Fio Cultural, 2021 - Org. Clécia Oliveira)
- Antologia Patuscada 2 (São Paulo: Editora Patuá, 2021 - Org. Eduardo Lacerda)
- FioZine 2021 (Rio de Janeiro: Fio Cultural, 2021 - Org. Clécia Oliveira)
