= The Fragrant Companion =

A Qing period copy of the play, from the National Library of China

The Fragrant Companion (traditional Chinese: 憐香伴; simplified Chinese: 怜香伴; pinyin: Lián Xiāng Bàn) is a Chinese play by Li Yu, written in 1651. The story is about two women, Cui Jianyun (Chinese: 崔笺云; pinyin: Cuī Jiànyún) and Cao Yuhua (Chinese: 曹语花; pinyin: Cáo Yǔhuā), who fall for each other.

The story is about female homosexuality in a patriarchal society.

== Plot ==
Cui Jianyun, wife of the scholar Fan Jiefu (Chinese: 范介夫; pinyin: Fàn Jièfū), goes to a temple to burn joss to the gods after her honeymoon. At the temple she meets Cao Yuhua, the daughter of Lord Cao, who is two years her junior. Cui Jianyun is attracted to Cao Yuhua's extraordinary fragrance and Cao Yuhua is attracted to Cui Jianyun's poetic talent. Cui Jianyun prays to be turned into a man so she can marry Cao Yuhua. When the miracle does not occur, Cui Jianyun begins wearing men's clothing and marries Cao Yuhua secretly. However they are soon separated.

Dreaming together by night

Dressing together by day

Flowered countenances side by side in the mirror, two fragrant buds on a stem.

Deep in the inner chambers, harmonizing our song, step by step,

Just like a husband and wife.

— Excerpt from the text, translated by Jessica Moyer

In order to live together, Cui Jianyun persuades Fan Jiefu to send a matchmaker to Lord Cao's house, asking him to grant her daughter to him as a second wife. Lord Cao flies into a rage at the thought of his daughter becoming a mere concubine to the scholar. He throws out the matchmaker, leaves at once for the capital with Cao Yuhua, and orders Fan to be stripped of his title. After numerous twists and turns, Cui Jianyun and Cao Yuhua manage to reunite and in the end Fan Jiefu is given permission to take them both as wives.

== Performances ==
This story was adapted into Peking opera in 1954, and re-adapted into Kun Opera. This premiered in Beijing in 2010, to commemorates the 400th anniversary of Li Yu's birthday.
