= Suburban Souls =

- Author: Anonymous (Jacky S--)
- Language: English
- Genre: Erotic literature
- Published: 1901
- Publication place: France
- Pages: 304
- OCLC: 70710596

Suburban Souls: The Erotic Psychology of a Man and a Maid is an anonymous erotic novel in three volumes originally printed and published in Paris in one hundred and fifty copies in 1901 for distribution amongst private subscribers only. The book has been reprinted by Grove Press in the United States in 1968, 1979, and 1994, and in England by Wordsworth Classic in 1995 with an introduction by Richard Manton (pseudonym for the late British author Donald Thomas) and Barney Rosset, the former owner of the publishing house Grove Press.

The book, which is considered a classic of the 20th century erotic fiction genre, was originally published by Charles Carrington, a leading British publisher of erotica in late-19th and early 20th century Europe, and possibly written by him also under the pseudonym of Jacky S--. Slang lexicographer John S. Farmer has been suggested as another possible candidate for the book's real author.
