= Edmund Curll =

British publisher and bookseller (c. 1675–1747)

Edmund Curll (c. 1675 – 11 December 1747) was an English bookseller and publisher. His name has become synonymous, through the attacks on him by Alexander Pope, with unscrupulous publication and publicity. Curll rose from poverty to wealth through his publishing, and he did this by approaching book printing in a mercenary and unscrupulous manner. By cashing in on scandals, publishing pornography, offering up patent medicine, using all publicity as good publicity, he managed a small empire of printing houses. He would publish high and low quality writing alike, so long as it sold. He was born in the West Country, and his late and incomplete recollections (in The Curliad) say that his father was a tradesman. He was an apprentice to a London bookseller in 1698 when he began his career.

== Early hucksterism ==
An auctioneer selling books from a hanged man, circa 1700. Curll got his start doing this kind of work in 1708.

At the end of his seven-year apprenticeship, he began selling books at auction. His master, Richard Smith, went bankrupt in 1708, and Curll took over his shop at that point. His early practice was to work in conjunction with other booksellers to write, publish, and sell pamphlets and books and to exploit any furore to produce "accounts" and arguments. For example, in 1712 the witch trial of Jane Wenham had the public's interest, and one partner wrote a pamphlet exonerating her, while another condemned her, and both pamphlets were sold at all three shops. He also manufactured a set group of newspaper quarrels between the various "authors" for and against Mrs. Wenham to get free advertising.

As a bookseller, Curll's stock was always exceptionally eclectic, and as a publisher, he produced inexpensive books on inexpensive paper. Most of his books sold for one or two shillings, putting them within reach of tradesmen, apprentices, and servants. He carried and published erotic literature and mixed it with serious Christian calls to prayer, "medical" texts, and the like. He also published Whig political tracts. One of his earliest productions was John Dunton's The Athenian Spy, but he also had titles like The Way of a Man with a Maid and The Devout Christian's Companion. Curll also sold medical cures themselves, and he was unscrupulous in promoting them. In 1708, he published The Charitable Surgeon, a feigned book of medical advice on syphilis cures from a pretended physician of public spirit. It explained that one John Spinke's cure of mercury was devoid of worth and that the only efficacious cure came from Edmund Curll's own shop. Dr. Spinke wrote a pamphlet in reply, and characteristically Curll wrote a reply to that and, to create a scandal, made the outlandish claim that Spinke was ignorant and offered five pounds if Spinke could come to Curll's shop and translate five lines of Latin. Spinke did so and used the money to buy some of Curll's "cure", which he had analyzed. In the end, Curll's "cure" was also mercury. Curll kept publishing his Charitable Surgeon, however, and expanded it with A new method of curing, without internal medicines, that degree of the venereal disease, called a gonorrhea, or clap.

In 1712, Curll's shop was so successful that he opened a branch in Tunbridge Wells, and he moved to a bigger store on Fleet Street. He began to write his own pamphlets around this time. In 1712 he collaborated with John Morphew, a Tory, to cash in on the excitement over the Henry Sacheverell controversy. After their collaboration, Curll was able to hire away one of Morphew's hack writers.

== Piracy ==
One feature of Curll's career, and the one that most cemented his reputation through the ages, was the unauthorized publication of works originally produced by another house, often against the author's wishes. Usually, Curll stayed just across the legal line from piracy, but not always. In 1707, Curll announced in the newspapers that he was going to publish Poems on Several Occasions by Matthew Prior. Jacob Tonson had the sole rights to Prior's works, but Curll published anyway. In 1716, Curll again announced his intent to publish Matthew Prior's works, and Prior himself wrote letters of protest to the newspapers. The quarrel with Tonson, and Prior's objections, only served as publicity, however, and Curll published the book anyway. In 1710, he printed up Jonathan Swift's Meditation Upon a Broomstick. He also that year wrote a "key" to other Swift works, and in 1713 he produced a key to A Tale of a Tub. Swift was angry at Curll for revealing his authorship of the works (as Swift was ascending in the Church of England), but he was also amused at the dullness of Curll's explication of his works. He wrote to Alexander Pope that dunces like Curll were tools for a satirist, that they were valuable in their way. Having gotten into the habit of sapping Swift, Curll did not relent, especially after Swift incorporated Curll's notes (without permission) into the apparatus of A Tale of a Tub. In 1726, Curll produced a wildly inaccurate "key" to Swift's Gulliver's Travels. Another alleged case of unauthorized publication came with the poet Edward Young, who sent a poem to Curll for publication, with a letter of solicitation. When the poem was published in 1717, Young took out an ad claiming that the poem and letter were forgeries. In fact, the poem was in praise of a politician who had lost place, and Young's letter was authentic.

His connection with the anonymously published Court Poems in 1716 led to the long quarrel with Alexander Pope. Curll got three anonymous poems, by Pope, John Gay, and Lady Mary Wortley Montagu. Pope wrote to Curll warning him not to publish the poems, which only confirmed for Curll the authorship. He published them. In response, Pope and Bernard Lintot, Pope's publisher, met with Curll at the Swan tavern. Pope and Lintot seemed resigned and worried only for John Gay's prospects. However, they had filled Curll's glass with an emetic, causing him, when he went home, to go into convulsions of vomiting. Pope published two pamphlet accounts of the incident and informed the public (a la Swift's Bickerstaff Papers) that Curll was dead. Curll seized upon the publicity for his own purposes, as well. He published and advertised John Oldmixon's The Catholick Poet and John Dennis's The True Character of Mr Pope and his Writings. He reprinted these in 1716, when the atmosphere of England was highly charged after the failure of the Jacobite rising of 1715.

The next step in the Pope/Curll battle came in 1716, when Curll got a bawdy version of the first Psalm written years earlier by Pope. He published it in folio and announced that he would be the future publisher of all of Pope's works. Also in that year, Curll was sent to jail for publishing an account of the trial of the Earl of Winton. No sooner was he out than he produced a biography of Dr. Robert South, former head of Westminster School. He had printed the eulogy for Dr. South by the current school head, as well. He was invited to the school and expected to be honored for the work he had done on behalf of the memory of the school's masters. Instead, the students forced him to his knees by beatings and forced him to beg for an apology. They then wrapped him in a blanket and began beating him with sticks and tossing him in the air. Samuel Wesley, a student at the school and older brother to John Wesley, wrote a mock-heroic poem on the blanket incident. Curll suspected that Pope and his friends were somehow responsible for his treatment, and he began to employ the "phantom poet." He published a poem called "The Petticoat" by "J. Gay." This poet was Francis Chute, who used the pseudonym "Joseph Gay." To siphon off sales of John Gay's poems and to wound Pope and his friends, Curll used this phantom twice more.

== Biographies, obscenity and "Curlicisms" ==
He was notorious for commissioning hack-written biographies of famous people as soon as they died and for publishing them without regard for inaccuracies and inventions. Perhaps the reference to Curll most often repeated by posterity is John Arbuthnot's quip that Curll's biographies had become "one of the new terrors of death" (quoted in Robert Carruthers, The Poetical Works of Pope, 1853, vol. 1, ch. 3). Curll's entire goal was to be the first to the shops with a biography and not in any way to be the best or most accurate account. Thus, his method was to announce that a biography was about to be published and ask the public to contribute any memories, letters, or speeches of the deceased. He would then include these (and sometimes nothing else) in the "biography." He had no care at all for accuracy and would accept accounts from enemies as quickly as friends. When contributions failed, he would hire an author to invent material. In 1717 alone, he produced biographies of Bishop Burnet and Elias Ashmole. He would later produce, exactly as Swift predicted in his 1731 Lines on the Death of Dr. Swift, a hack biography of Swift. Arbuthnot's terror was apt, for there was virtually no recourse against Curll's press. In 1721, he published a biography of the Duke of Buckingham. He was summoned to the House of Lords for trial, and Lords made a new law making it illegal to publish anything about or by a lord without permission.

Curll became notorious for his indecent publications, so much so that "Curlicism" was regarded as a synonym for literary indecency. In 1718, Curll published Eunuchism Display'd, and Daniel Defoe attacked it as pornography, calling it a "Curlicism." Curll capitalized on the charge by writing Curlicism Display'd as a defense. The pamphlet was, however, a listing of books in Curll's shop, so Curll turned the entire thing into an advertisement. In 1723, he published A Treatise of the Use of Flogging in Venereal Affairs, which was a translation of De Usu Flagrorum. To the book, Curll added a sexual frontispiece and advertised other "medical" books. In 1724, he published Venus in the Cloister, a translation of a mildly erotic French title of the previous century that argued that it is the church, and not Christ, that forbids sexual exploration. That year, an anonymous complaint to the Lords mentioned these two titles specifically as obscenities. As with previous scandals, Curll attempted to turn it to profit by publishing The Humble Representation of Edmund Curll and rushing forward a new edition of Venus in the Cloister. He was arrested in March and held until July. The courts determined that there was no actual obscenity law, so they prosecuted him for libel. Curll published an apology and promised to quit publishing, but the apology was an ad for two new titles. While Curll was in prison, he met John Ker, who wished his memoirs published. The work contained state secrets from the reign of Queen Anne, so Curll was nervous. He wrote to Robert Walpole for permission. Getting no answer, he treated silence as assent and published the book. The last volume of the memoirs was done by Edmund's son, Henry Curll, and both Henry and Edmund were arrested. They spent fourteen months in prison (to February 1728) and were fined for the Nun in her Smock and The use of flogging, and sentenced to an hour in the pillory for publishing Ker's memoirs. Curll wrote and published a broadsheet for his pillory day saying that publishing Ker's memoirs had been done out of loyalty to the old queen only, and the crowd therefore did not beat him. Instead, they cheered Curll and carried him away on their shoulders.

== The Dunciad ==
Pope and Curll tangled again in 1726, when he published some of Pope's letters without authorization. Pope avenged himself by having Curll figure very prominently in the 1728 Dunciad. In fact, no figure, including the "King of Dunces" Lewis Theobald (nor, later, Colley Cibber) is ridiculed as consistently and viciously in Dunciad as Edmund Curll. Curll's response was to print a pirate edition, then to produce a "Key" to the poem to explain all the people Pope attacked, and then to publish reply poems that were attacks on Pope personally. The Popiad, written possibly by Lady Mary Wortley Montagu, The Female Dunciad, and The Twickenham Hotch-Potch all came out in 1728 as answers. In 1729, Pope's Dunciad Variorum took further, prose swipes at Curll, and Curll produced The Curliad: a Hypercritic upon the Dunciad Variorum. It contained an autobiography, a defense against charges of obscenity (explaining that the flogging text had been meant as a cure for impotence), and a defense of his actions with Pope.

Later in 1729, Curll set out to publish a volume of William Congreve. John Arbuthnot complained in the press of Curll's action, so Curll renamed his shop "Congreve's Head" and put up a bust of Congreve to spite Arbuthnot and Congreve's friends. In 1731 he moved shops to Burleigh Street and advertised an upcoming life of Pope, saying, "Nothing shall be wanting but his (universally desired) Death." In response to his call for materials, a person known as "P.T." offered Curll some Pope letters. The letters, however, were fakes, and the entire offer had been a set-up by Pope, who published a corrected version of his letters in 1735. Curll moved his shop again in that year and called it "Pope's Head" and sold under the sign of Pope. Two years later, he published five volumes of Pope's letters. In 1741, Pope finally prevailed against Curll in the courts. A court ruled that letters affix copyright to the author, although a recipient of a letter has no copyright status.

== Merryland ==
In his last years Curll published a series of "Merryland" books which constitute a major contribution to the somewhat peculiar genre of English seventeenth and eighteenth century erotic fiction in which the female body (and sometimes the male) was described in terms of topographical metaphor. The earliest work in this genre seems to be Erotopolis: The Present State of Bettyland (1684) probably by Charles Cotton. This was included, in abbreviated form, in Curll's The Potent Ally: or Succours from Merryland (1741). Other works published by Curll include A New Description of Merryland. Containing a Topographical, Geographical and Natural History of that Country (1740) by Thomas Stretzer (of whom nothing is known), Merryland Displayed (1741) and set of maps entitled A Compleat Set of Charts of the Coasts of Merryland (1745).

In Curll's last years, he continued to publish "Curlicisms" mixed with serious and valuable works. His will indicates that his son had died without issue and that there was no family except his wife. Curll died in London on 11 December 1747.

== See also ==
- Elizabeth Barry (an actress whose biography Curll published)
- Charles Gildon (another disreputable biographer whose accounts still inform biographies)
- Elizabeth Thomas, whose involvement with Curll earned her infamy in Pope's Dunicad as "Curll's Corinna."
