= Cairo Trindade =

Brazilian writer (b. 1946)

Cairo de Assis Trindade (born in Porto Alegre, 1946. - Rio de Janeiro, 11 December 2019), better known as Cairo Trindade, is a Brazilian poet, short story writer, chronicler, dramaturge, editor, performer, actor and literary advisor.

== Career ==
In 1968, he moved to Rio de Janeiro.

He was one of the creators of the Porn Art Movement in the 80's, having organized the "Topless Literário", a nudist parade along the Copacabana border. He and his wife Denizis Trindade form the "Dupla do Prazer", with poetic performances.

He published anthologies of authors of his literary workshop and participated in the Fresta Literária, an erotic poetry slam organized by the poet Vinni Corrêa.

His works were exhibited in museums in Brazil, Germany and other countries.

== Bibliography ==
Poetry

- PoetAstro (1974)
- Saca na geral (1980)
- Liberatura (1990)
- Poematemagia (2001)
- Poesya, que porra é essa? (2011)

Dramaturgy

- Verbenas de Seda (1973)
- Raízes e Asas (1978)

Anthologies

- Antolorgia: Arte Pornô (1984)
