= Discursive dominance =

Sociology concept

Discursive dominance or discursive power is the ultimate emergence of one discourse as dominant among competing ones in their struggle for dominance. Ultimately, one of the discourses emerges as dominant. The word ‘discursive’ is related to the word discourse, which refers to "communication of ideas".

In a society there are competing discourses (or narratives) regarding anything and everything such as feminism, racism, casteism, communalism, regionalism, economic development, democracy, governance, etc.

== See also ==
- Cultural hegemony
- Soft power
