= Li Yu (playwright) =

Chinese playwright, novelist and publisher

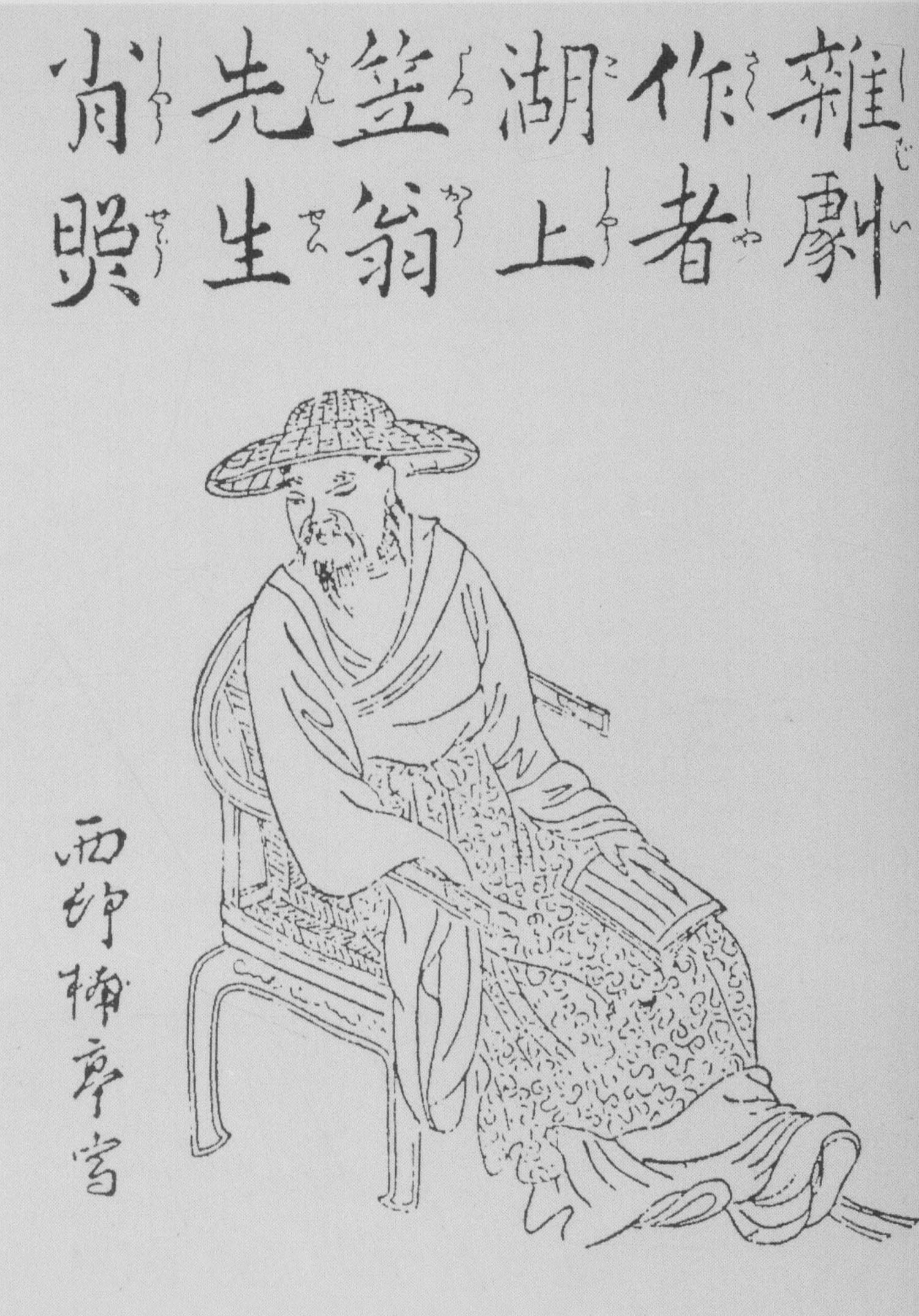
A portrait of Li Yu

Li Yu (Chinese: 李漁; pinyin: Lǐ Yú, given name: 仙侣 Xiānlǚ; courtesy name: 笠翁 Lìwēng; 1611–1680 AD), also known as Li Liweng, was a Chinese playwright, novelist and publisher.

== Life ==
Born in 1611 in Rugao, in today's Jiangsu province, Li came from a literati family and grew up during the final decades of the Ming dynasty. Following his father's death in 1629, he moved to his ancestral home in Lanxi, Zhejiang, where he continued preparing for the civil service examinations. He passed the county-level of the imperial examination, but he couldn't advance to the provincial level before the political turmoil caused by the transition to the Qing. In 1644, Li fled to the mountains to avoid the war associated with the collapse of the Ming Dynasty. After the conflict passed, he returned to Lanxi in 1646 and then relocated to Hangzhou in 1652, an urban center known for its commercial theater and publishing industries, where he pursued a career as an author, producer, and playwright.

== Writings ==
Within about a decade of living in Hangzhou, Li achieved commercial success as a writer in erotic literature, establishing himself as a distinctive figure in early Qing literature. The collections he published during this time period, including some of his well known short stories like Silent Operas (Wusheng xi, 1656), Priceless Gems (Liancheng bi, 1658), and Twelve Towers (Shi'er lou, 1658), explored the topics of love and gender roles. He also wrote plays such as Errors Caused by the Kite (Fengzheng wu) and The Fragrant Companion (Lian Xiang Ban, 1651), which were performed by his troupe on the Chinese Kun opera stage. In his fiction and drama, he frequently used irony and narrative inversion to examine social convention, as seen in stories like in House of Gathered Refinements (Cuiya lou, 1658), which is about same-sex love, and in The Carnal Prayer Mat (Rou putuan, 1657), which uses irony and eroticism to critique hypocrisy in Confucian ideals.

In 1662, Li moved to Nanjing, which was a commercial center known for its book trade and printing. This was around the same time he began expanding his themes beyond fictional narrative to include art, history, and everyday life. He published essays like A Brief History of the Old and New (Gujin Shilüe, 1659), New Aid for Governance (Zizhi xinshu chuji, 1663), and Discussions of the Past (Lungu, 1664). His essays during this time period spanned topics from gastronomy, governance, leisure, and architecture. For example in one of his most influential collections, Leisure Notes (Xiangqing ouji, 1671), he expressed his belief that having new, aesthetic enjoyment in everyday life is essential to personal cultivation. Scholars have noted that throughout his wide range of themes, Li maintained a consistent style, using humor to observe human behavior and the conditions of everyday living.

Li was critical of gambling, describing dice as innocent objects transformed into devils in the hands of gamblers.

== Translations ==
- Patrick Hanan et al. (1990). "Silent Operas (Wusheng Xi)". Hong Kong: Research Centre for Translation, Chinese University of Hong Kong. ISBN 978-9627255079
- Patrick Hanan (1996). The Carnal Prayer Mat. Honolulu : University of Hawaii Press. ISBN 0-8248-1798-2.
- Patrick Hanan (1998). Tower for the Summer Heat. New York : Columbia University Press. ISBN 0-231-11384-6.
- Nathan K Mao (1979). Twelve towers : short stories. Hong Kong: Chinese University Press. ISBN 962-201-170-5.
- Jacques Dars (2003). Au gré d'humeurs oisives : Les carnets secrets de Li Yu : un art du bonheur en Chine. Arles : Éditions Philippe Picquier. ISBN 2-87730-664-X
- Jou-pu-tuan : Andachtsmatten aus Fleisch; e. erot. Roman aus d. Ming-Zeit. Frankfurt am Main : Fischer-Taschenbuch-Verlag. ISBN 3-596-22451-9. 1986.
- LI‑YU Jeou-P'ou-T'ouan, la chair comme tapis de prière, translated by Pierre Klossowski; Éditions Jean-Jacques Pauvert, Paris, 1979
- Li Yu: À mari jaloux, femme fidèle, by Pascale Frey 1998

== Sources and further reading ==
- Chen, Duo, "Li Yu". Encyclopedia of China, 1st ed.
- Chun-Shu Chang and Shelley Hsueh-Lun Chang. Crisis and Transformation in Seventeenth-Century China: Society, Culture, and Modernity in Li Yü's World. Ann Arbor: University of Michigan Press, 1992. x, 452p. ISBN 0-472-10255-9.
- Owen, Stephen, "Li, Yu, Silent Operas (Wu-sheng xi)," in Stephen Owen, ed. An Anthology of Chinese Literature: Beginnings to 1911. New York: W. W. Norton, 1997. p. 915-941. (. (Archive).
- Patrick Hanan (1988). The Invention of Li Yu. Cambridge, Mass. : Harvard University Press. ISBN 0-674-46425-7. Comprehensive overview of Li Yu's life and works, containing many substantial excerpts from Li Yu's essays, plays, short stories and novel.
- Andrea Stocken: Das Ästhetikkonzept des Li Yu (1610–1680) im Xianqing ouji im Zusammenhang von Leben und Werk. 2005 ISBN 3-447-05120-5
- HENRY, Eric: Chinese Amusement - The Lively Plays of Li Yü.Archon Books Hamden, CT 1980
- Воскресенский Д.Н. Ли Юй. Полуночник Вэйян или подстилка из плоти. (пер. с кит., предисл., коммент.) М., Гудьял-Пресс
- Воскресенский Д.Н. Ли Юй. Двенадцать башен (повести XVII в.). (пер. с кит., предисл., коммент.) М., Гудьял-Пресс
- Hummel, Arthur W. Sr., ed. (1943). "Li Yü" . Eminent Chinese of the Ch'ing Period. United States Government Printing Office.
