= The Carnal Prayer Mat =

Chinese erotic novel

- Chapter one of the novel The Carnal Prayer Mat
- Author: Li Yu
- Original title: 肉蒲團
- Language: Chinese
- Subject: Sexual fantasy
- Genre: Erotic literature
- Publication date: 1657
- Publication place: China
- Media type: Print

Rouputuan
- Traditional Chinese: 肉蒲團
- Simplified Chinese: 肉蒲团
- Literal meaning: The Carnal Prayer Mat
Transcriptions
Standard Mandarin
- Hanyu Pinyin: Ròupútuán

Huiquanbao
- Traditional Chinese: 迴圈報
- Simplified Chinese: 回圈报
- Literal meaning: The Karmic Cycle
Transcriptions
Standard Mandarin
- Hanyu Pinyin: Huíquānbào

Juehouchan
- Traditional Chinese: 覺後禪
- Simplified Chinese: 觉后禅
- Literal meaning: Zen After Awakening
Transcriptions
Standard Mandarin
- Hanyu Pinyin: Juéhòuchán

Rouputuan, also known as Huiquanbao and Juehouchan, and translated as The Carnal Prayer Mat or The Before Midnight Scholar, is a 17th-century Chinese erotic novel published under a pseudonym but usually attributed to Li Yu. It was written in 1657 and published in 1693 during the Qing dynasty. It is divided into four volumes of five chapters apiece. It was published in Japan in 1705 as Nikubuton with a preface proclaiming it the greatest erotic novel of all time.

The novel had a controversial status in Chinese literature, and has long been banned and censored; recent scholarship treats the work as an allegory which uses its unabashed pornographic nature to attack Confucian puritanism. The prologue comments that sex is healthy when taken as if it were a drug, but not as if it were ordinary food.

== Plot summary ==
Set during the Yuan dynasty in the 14th century, the novel's protagonist, Weiyangsheng (未央生; lit. "Unrealised One" or "Unfinished One"), visits a Buddhist temple, where he meets a monk, who notes that he exhibits wisdom but also lust. Weiyangsheng says that the monk's purpose in life is to sit on a zafu (or prayer mat) and meditate, while his desire is to marry a beautiful woman and sit on a "carnal prayer mat" (肉蒲團). The title of the novel comes from this line said by Weiyangsheng.

Weiyangsheng is an egoistic young scholar who often boasts of his aspiration to marry the most beautiful woman in the world. He seeks neither fame nor glory, and prefers to indulge in women and sex. A monk called "Budai Heshang" (布袋和尚; lit. "Monk with a Cloth Sack") once urged him to give up on his philandering ways and follow the path of Buddhism, while his father-in-law, the Taoist Tiefei (鐵扉道人), also attempted to persuade him to be more decent, but Weiyangsheng ignored both of them.

On a trip to the capital city, Weiyangsheng encounters Saikunlun (賽崑崙), a bandit, and becomes sworn brothers with him. Saikunlun introduces Weiyangsheng to Tianji Zhenren (天際真人), a Taoist magician, who surgically enhances Weiyangsheng's penis by splicing strips of a dog's penis into it, causing it to be enlarged and become more 'powerful'. With Saikunlun's help, Weiyangsheng gets involved in illicit sexual relationships with many married women, including: Yanfang (艷芳), the wife of Quan Laoshi (權老實); Xiangyun (香雲), the wife of Xuanyuanzi (軒軒子); Ruizhu (瑞珠), the wife of Woyunsheng (臥雲生); Ruiyu (瑞玉), the wife of Yiyunsheng (倚雲生).

When Quan Laoshi learns of his wife's relationship with Weiyangsheng, he is furious and is determined to take revenge. He disguises himself and infiltrates Weiyangsheng's household, where he has an affair with Weiyangsheng's wife, Yuxiang (玉香), and makes her pregnant. Quan elopes with Yuxiang and sells her to a brothel to be a prostitute. Later, he realises that he has committed grave sins and decides to show penitence by becoming a monk and studying under Budai Heshang.

Meanwhile, in the brothel, Yuxiang is trained in a special technique – writing calligraphy by clutching a brush with her genitals. Later, she meets Xuanyuanzi, Woyunsheng and Yiyunsheng, and has sex with each of them. When Weiyangsheng visits the brothel, Yuxiang recognises her husband and commits suicide in shame. Weiyangsheng is given a good beating, which makes him come to his senses. He decides to follow in Quan Laoshi's footsteps and become a monk under Budai Heshang. He also castrates himself to avoid being distracted from this calling by his surgically enhanced penis.

The alternative Chinese titles of the novel – Huiquanbao (The Karmic Cycle) and Juehouchan (Zen After Awakening) – reflect the overarching theme of the story, specifically on Zen and the Buddhist concept of karma: Weiyangsheng had improper sexual relationships with the wives of Quan Laoshi and others, and later he received his karmic retribution when these men had sex with his wife; his sexual escapades came to an end when he finally 'awakened' (i.e. came to his senses) and decided to pursue Zen by following Budai Heshang.

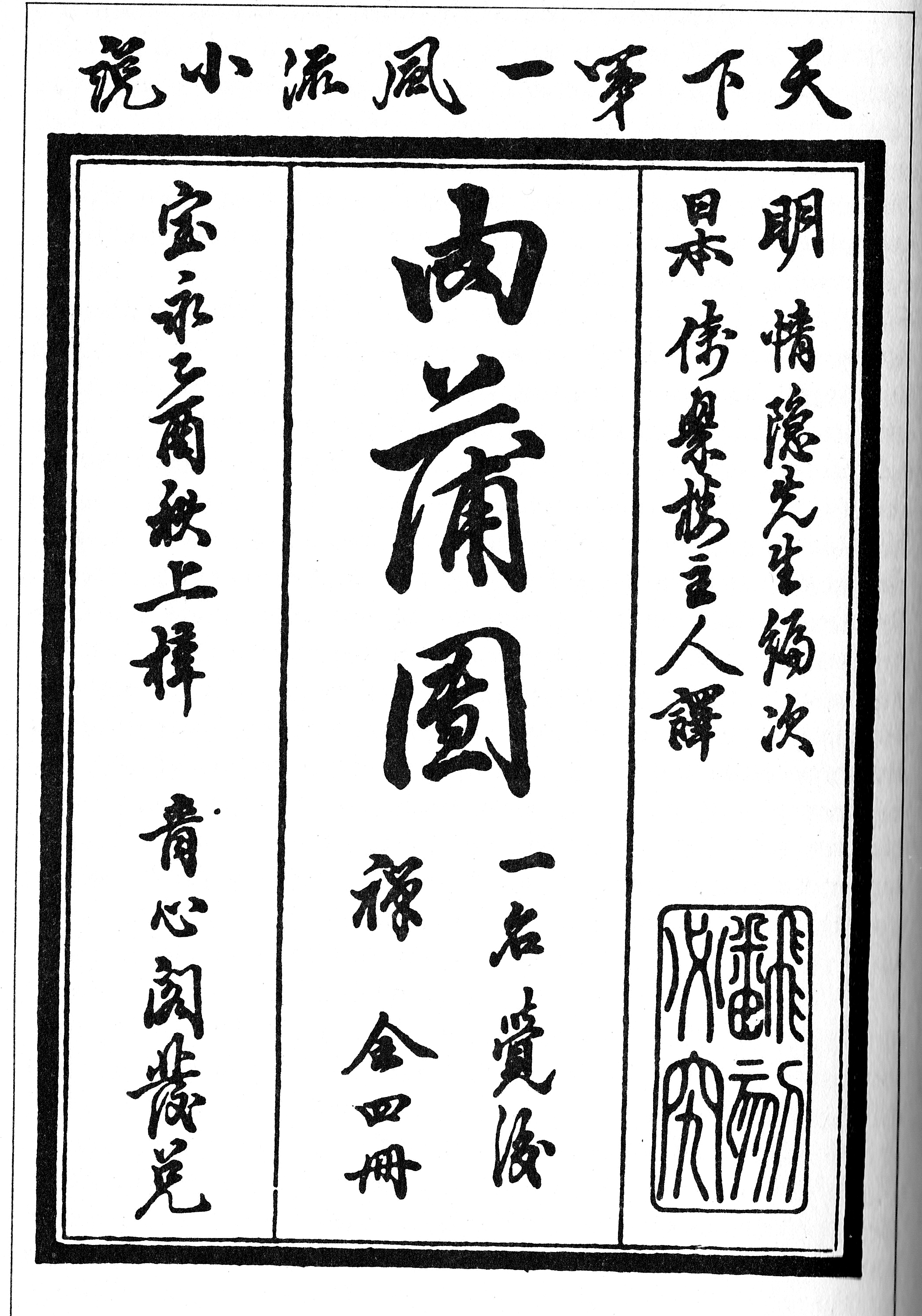
Cover page of the novel, 1705 edition, collection of the University of Tokyo.

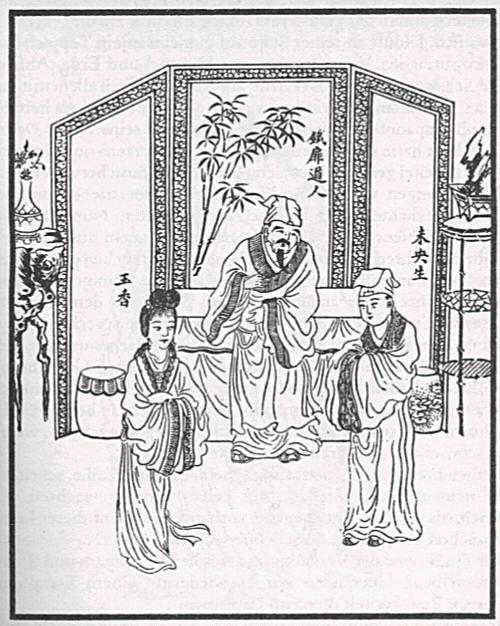
An 1894 illustration of Rouputuan. The three characters depicted are (from left to right): Yuxiang, the Taoist Tiefei, Weiyangsheng

== Analysis ==
The novel is part of the development away from earlier story-tellers' conventions toward a self-conscious original literary composition. The author's stance allows "refined interplay of irony between the characters, the plot, the readers, and, less perceptibly, the author himself". While story is "clearly an allegory", it does "not pretend to hide its realistic, pornographic nature". The structure of the narrative, a "rake's progress of a sort", is "neatly woven towards a climax", the outcome of which is an "apt, artificial conclusion of the ironical Buddhist framework" in the body of the narrative which follows the prologue in the first chapter. However, the first chapter seems to express the view that "sex is healthy, not devitalising, as in the traditional Chinese assertion, so long as it is 'taken' as if it were a drug, and not 'consumed' as if it were an ordinary food". The "moralistic, Buddhist stance, which leads to self-emasculation, need not be taken seriously. Yet its assistance in denouncing the stingy Confucian puritanism it attacks, is certainly intended."

== Authorship ==
Inside the pages of a printed edition of The Carnal Prayer Mat

The scholars Chun-shu Chang and Shelley Hsueh-lun Chang discuss the problems of authorship. They point out that the attribution to Li did not come until 1715, 35 years after Li's death, and was offered with no evidence, and no new evidence was added in the following years of the Qing dynasty. They further point out that in modern times Lu Xun suggested that the novel had a spirit and style akin to Li's, but he did not elaborate. The Changs acknowledge Patrick Hanan's conclusion that "so distinctive is his brand of fiction that although the novel has never actually been proved to be by Li Yu, one has only to read it alongside his stories to feel the truth of the attribution." However, they themselves argue that "we cannot conclude that Li Yu was the author of Prayer Mat of Flesh. Andre Levy in the Indiana Companion to Traditional Chinese Literature says that the author is "probably" Li Yu. The literary historians Wilt Idema and Lloyd Haft simply say Li is "often considered" to be the author.

== Analysis ==
Robert E. Hegel wrote that The Carnal Prayer Mat was intended to satirise the imperial examination system and parody the patterns in caizi jiaren novels.

== Translations ==
- Manchu: During the Qing dynasty, the book was translated into Manchu as ᡰᡝᠣ
  ᡦᡠ
  ᡨᡠᠸᠠᠨ
  ᡳ
  ᠪᡳᡨᡥᡝ (Möllendorff transliteration: Žeo pu tuwan i bithe). This was issued as: Martin Walravens, Lutz Bieg, Martin Gimm (eds.), Der chinesische Roman Rou putuan 肉蒲團 in manjurischer Übersetzung der Berliner Handschrift aus der Zeit um 1700 (Berlin: Staatsbibliothek zu Berlin, 2011). In the series Neuerwerbungen der Ostasienabteilung ("New Acquisitions of the East Asia Department"), special issue 27.
- English: Patrick Hanan, The Carnal Prayer Mat (Honolulu: University of Hawaii Press, 1996). ISBN 0-8248-1798-2
- English: Richard Martin, translated from the German of Franz Kuhn, Jou Pu Tuan (The Prayer Mat of Flesh) (New York: Grove Press, 1963), published in the United Kingdom as The Before Midnight Scholar (London: André Deutsch), 1965.
- French: Pierre Klossowski, Jeou p'ou t'ouan ou la chair comme tapis de prière (Paris, J.-J. Pauvert) 1962.
- German: Franz Kuhn, Jou Pu Tuan: ein erotisch-moralischer Roman aus der Ming-Zeit mit 62 chinesische Holzschnitten (Zürich: Verlage Die Waage, 1959).
- Czech: Oldřich Král, Rouputuan - Meditační rohožky z masa, Maxima 2011, ISBN 978-80-86921-06-8
- Hungarian: Kiss Imre, A szerelem imaszőnyege - Erotikus regény a Ming-korból, 1989 ISBN 963 241 698 8
- Hebrew: Dan Deor, מחצלת הבשרים (Makhtselet Habesarim), 2005 ISBN 965-13-1743-4
- Italian: Anna Maria Greimel, translated from the German, Il tappeto da preghiera di carne (Milano: Bompiani), 1973.

== Later popular culture ==
The novel was loosely adapted into the Hong Kong erotic films Sex and Zen and 3D Sex and Zen: Extreme Ecstasy.
