= Royal Mail Group Security =

Law enforcement branch of the Royal Mail

- Royal Mail insignia

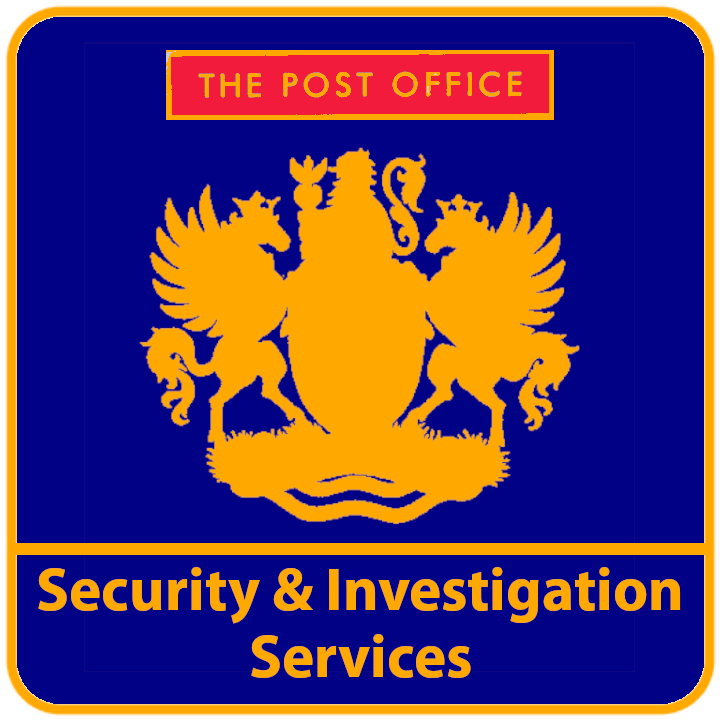
- Badge issued to POSIS

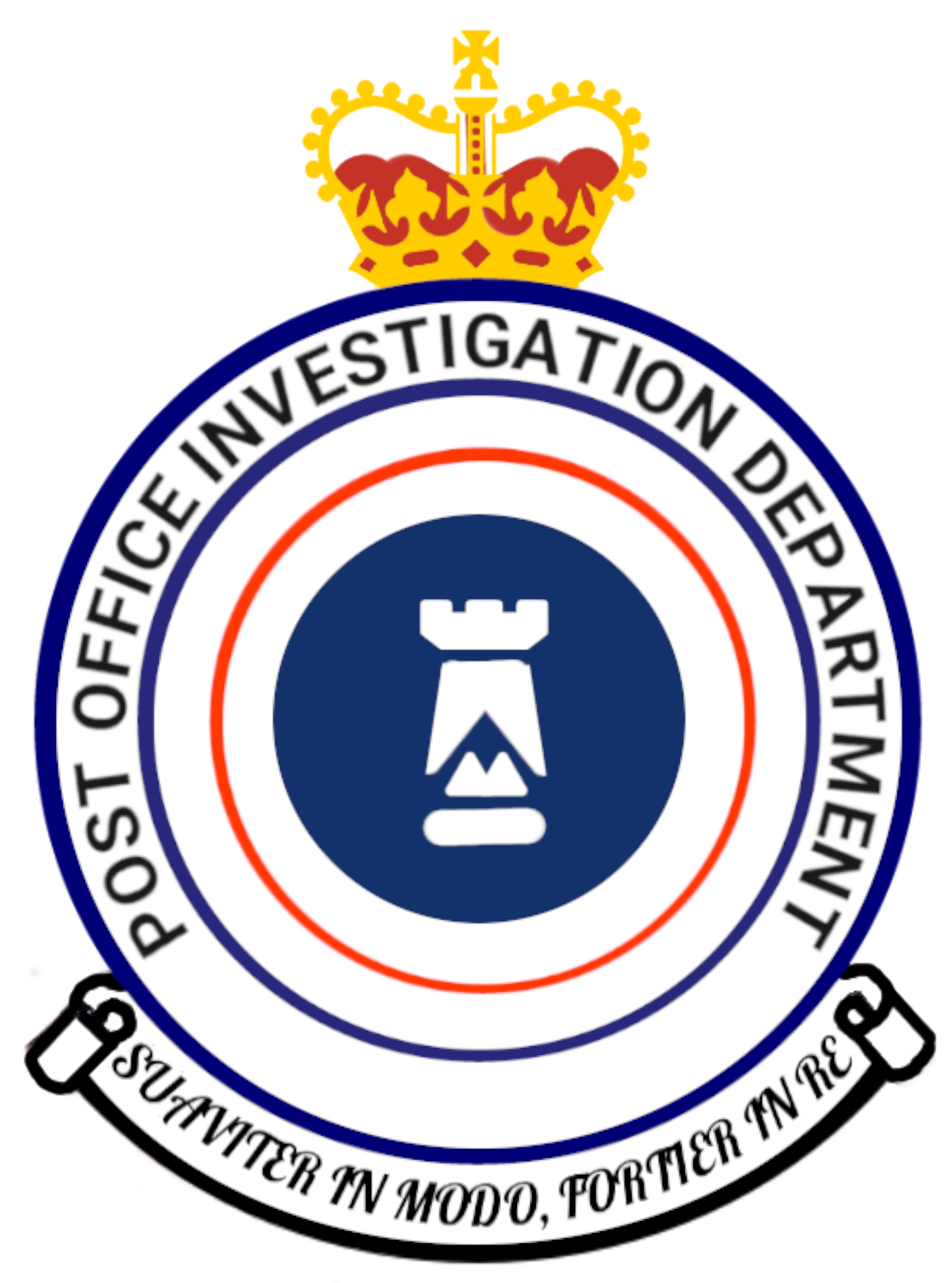
- Badge issued to POID
- Motto: SUAVITER IN MODO, FORTIER IN RE; Gentle in Manner, Resolute in Deed

Agency overview
- Formed: 1683

Jurisdictional structure
- Operations jurisdiction: United Kingdom

Operational structure
- Headquarters: London
- Elected officers responsible: Postmaster General of the United Kingdom (1683–1969); Minister of Posts and Telecommunications (1969–1974)
- Agency executives: Solicitor to the General Post Office (1683–1816); Secretary to the General Post Office (1816–1848); Inspector General of the Post (1848–1858); Secretary to the General Post Office (1858–)
- Parent agency: General Post Office (1683–1969); The Post Office (1969–1974); Royal Mail Group (1974–2012); Royal Mail (2012–Present)

Notables
- Person: Edmund Yates, Agency Director (1861–1871)

Royal Mail Group Security (RMGS), the investigative and security function of Royal Mail, is the oldest functioning law enforcement agency in the world. Prior to the full divorce of Post Office Limited and Royal Mail in 2012, RMGS was a branch within the larger Royal Mail Group Centre, operating alongside Post Office Security and Investigation Services (POSIS) to maintain proper function of The Post Office. RMGS was bifurcated from POSIS in 1999 – before that, POSIS was the sole investigative agency for the entire Royal Mail Group, with its executive board at headquarters known as the Security and Investigation Executive (S&IE). Before the year 1969, the Royal Mail was literally the "property of the Crown," and its agents were all officers of the State. However, since 1969 and the creation of the Statutory Corporation, their enforcement powers have been more limited.

Known before 1996 as the Post Office Investigation Department (POID), before 1967 as the Post Office Investigation Branch (IB), before 1908 as the Confidential Enquiry Branch, before 1883 as the Missing Letter Branch, and before 1816 by the nickname of The Enquirers, it has been a function of the British Postal system since 1683. For over three centuries, it has investigated those alleged criminals who have committed package theft, mail robbery, mail fraud, highway robbery, sedition, terrorism, communist activities, murder, smuggling, and other crimes involving the post. It has also been the primary investigative authority over employees of the British postal system, and until 1836, the Missing Letter Branch pursued the death penalty against any postal carrier who had stolen a single letter.

IB was the principal investigating agency into the incidents of the Great Train Robbery, directing the efforts of the Buckinghamshire Police, the Train Robbery Squad, and the Metropolitan Police. POID was especially involved in the pursuit of the serial killer Donald Neilson.

From 1968 onward, after the disastrous handling of the General Post Office by John Stonehouse (who turned out to be a Czech-KGB spy, and faked his own death in 1974), Neoliberal and Libertarian elements of the Liberal Democrats and Conservatives undertook decades-long efforts at privatization of the Post. In 1996, a massive attempt to fully privatize the British postal system was undertaken. Despite the failure of this attempt, it still resulted in the effective dismantling of POID in what was called a "modernization" program – one that would for the successors of POID – RMGS and POSIS – be the inception of the disastrous British Post Office Scandal, known today as "the greatest miscarriage of justice in British history." Confusingly, today, Royal Mail is what Brits call the company that manages the bulk of their postal services, while Post Office Limited is an entirely different organization that only oversees a very limited scope of postal services.

== Origins of postal intelligence and security ==
=== Creation of the British Post (1635) ===
The English monarchy maintained some form of postal system since the Middle Ages, and Charles I of England established an official British Post in 1635. For about twenty years, this organization operated as a once-weekly delivery service. The Post, being the state-authorized entity, was the center of all communications throughout Britain – the only other method to communicate with someone directly was to talk to them, disregarding smoke signals and wigwags. There were many private couriers, but none of them could be relied upon with the same official guarantee of delivery as that of the state's service.

=== The GPO and Cromwell's postal intelligence service (1653–1660) ===
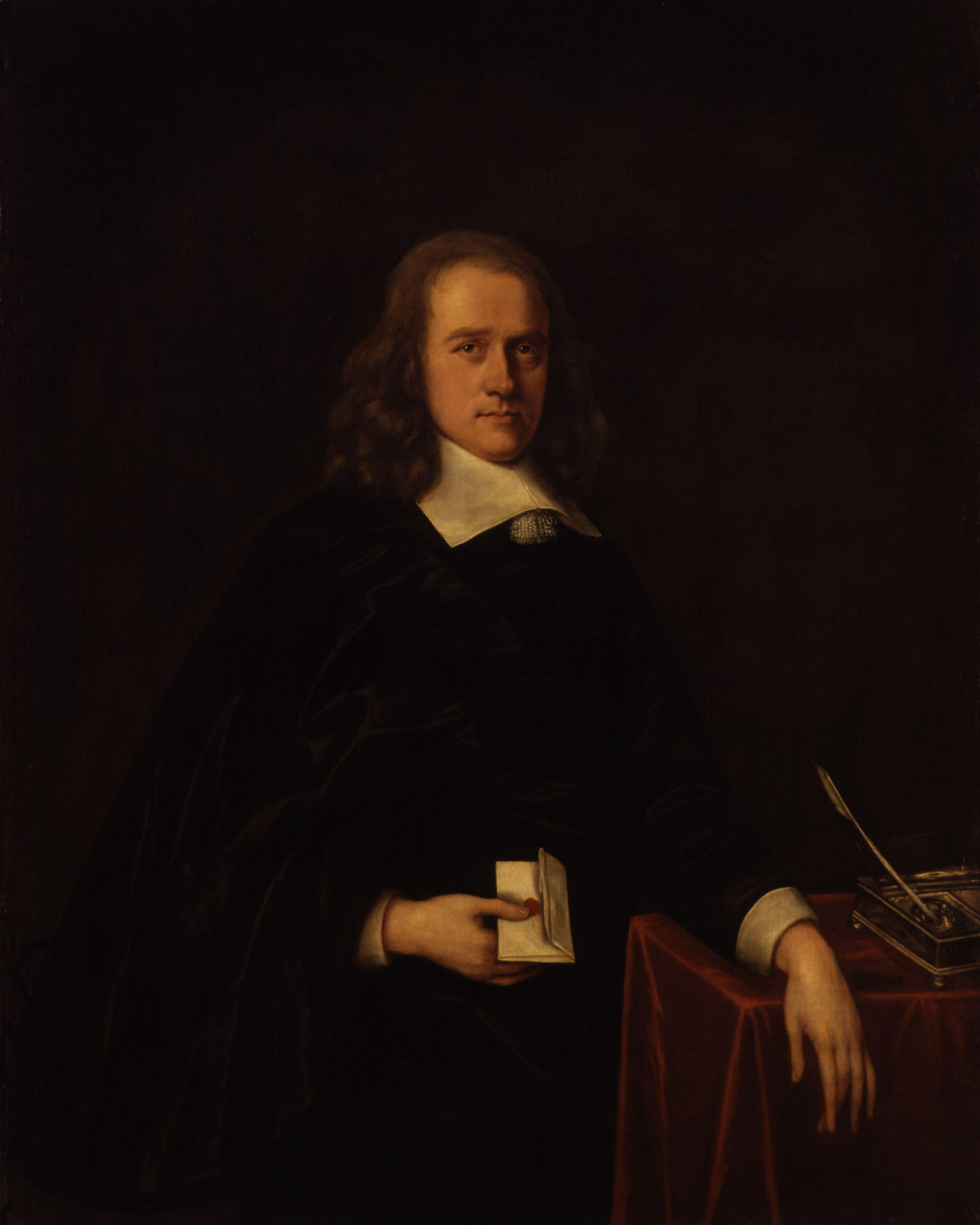
John Thurloe, pictured here holding an opened letter.

It was not until the British Interregnum, however, that Oliver Cromwell and The Protectorate established the General Post Office (GPO) in 1653, operating it as a mechanism of the Republic. The Post Office Act of 1657, in addition to fixing the rate of postage, authorized the Republican Secretary of State, John Thurloe, to access the monopoly of the Post to gather intelligence on enemies of the state, and to oversee intelligence capabilities for the Roundheads. The GPO became England's largest intelligence apparatus, performing intelligence gathering, postal censorship, and surveillance duties, among other activities. Thurloe was removed from his office, accused of treason, and arrested in May 1660.

=== The Restoration Post Office and the Stuart postal intelligence service (1660–1683) ===
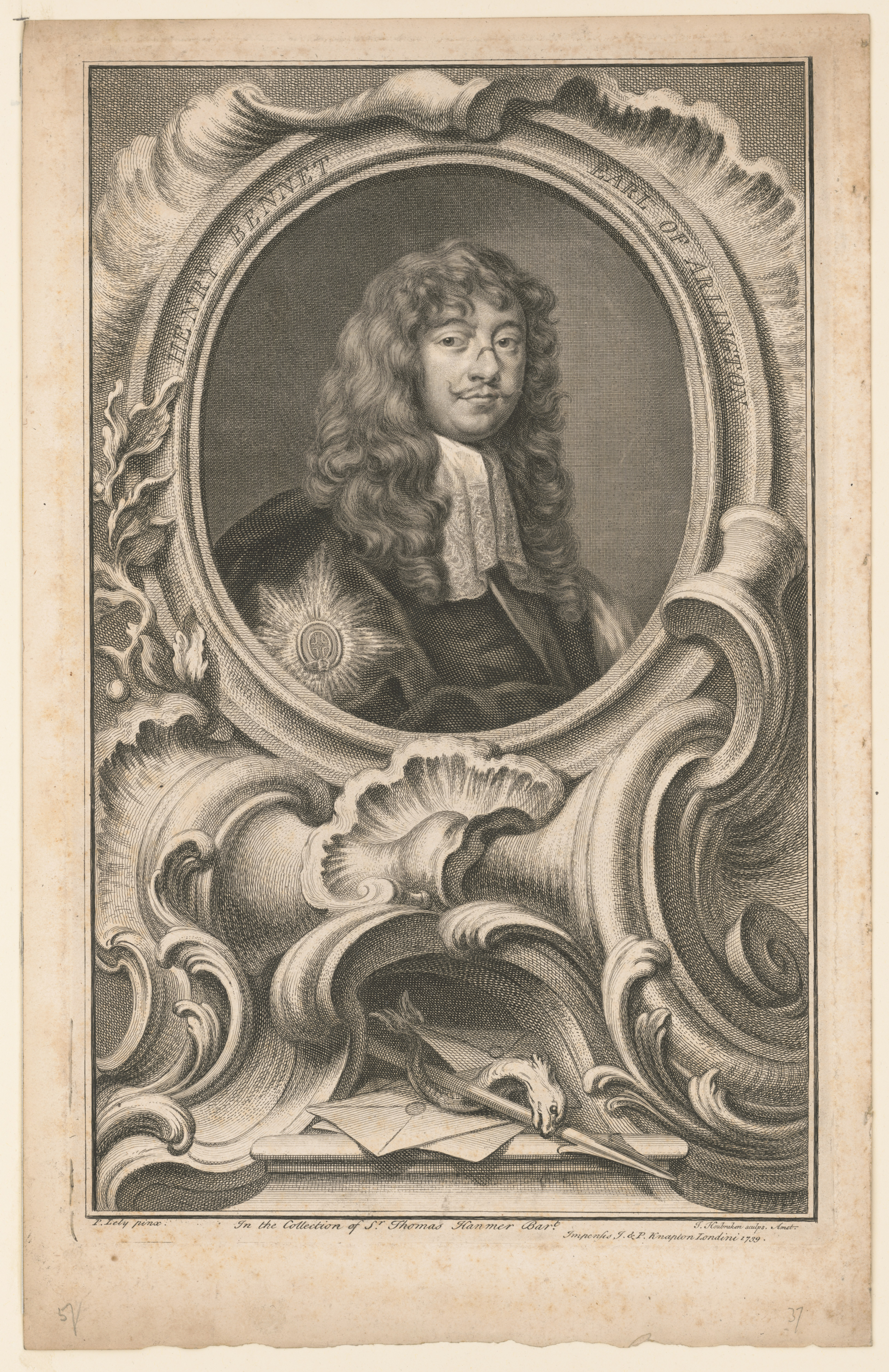
Henry Bennet, 1st Earl of Arlington oversaw the Post during the creation of the Solicitor's Office, and especially went on a campaign of purging the postal system of any Roundhead sympathies.

The Royalists did not end Thurloe's work, only its targets. While the methods remained the same, the targets shifted as the continuing wars upset the power balance of Great Britain. Through the rest of the Seventeenth Century, persons secret and unknown were assigned with opening and reading the mails of suspected traitors to the regime. The knowledge in the general public that the Post Office was not only carrying letters, but had normalized the practice of reading correspondences, caused a fear in Britain that their letters were not secure, which was a deliberate tactic by the Post Office. Their intention was twofold: the act of reading the mail ensured that the King knew all in his land, and the act of letting people know about it caused enough fear to hope that the Post would no longer be used to commit treason.

The Restoration Act of 1660 created the Restoration Post Office and fermented the machinery of the post, with its headquarters at the General Letter Office on Clock Lane, Dowgate. Charles II of England continued to rely on GPO largely as the center of his own massive royal Stuart intelligence system. Only one year later, in 1661, the GPO was purged of all British Republicans and Roundheads who had been working at the Post under John Wildman and Henry Bishop – the same year that Bishop invented the first known postmark at Clock Lane. Bishop, despite being suspected to hold Republican sympathies, was retained as Postmaster General of the United Kingdom until the appointment of Daniel O'Neill.

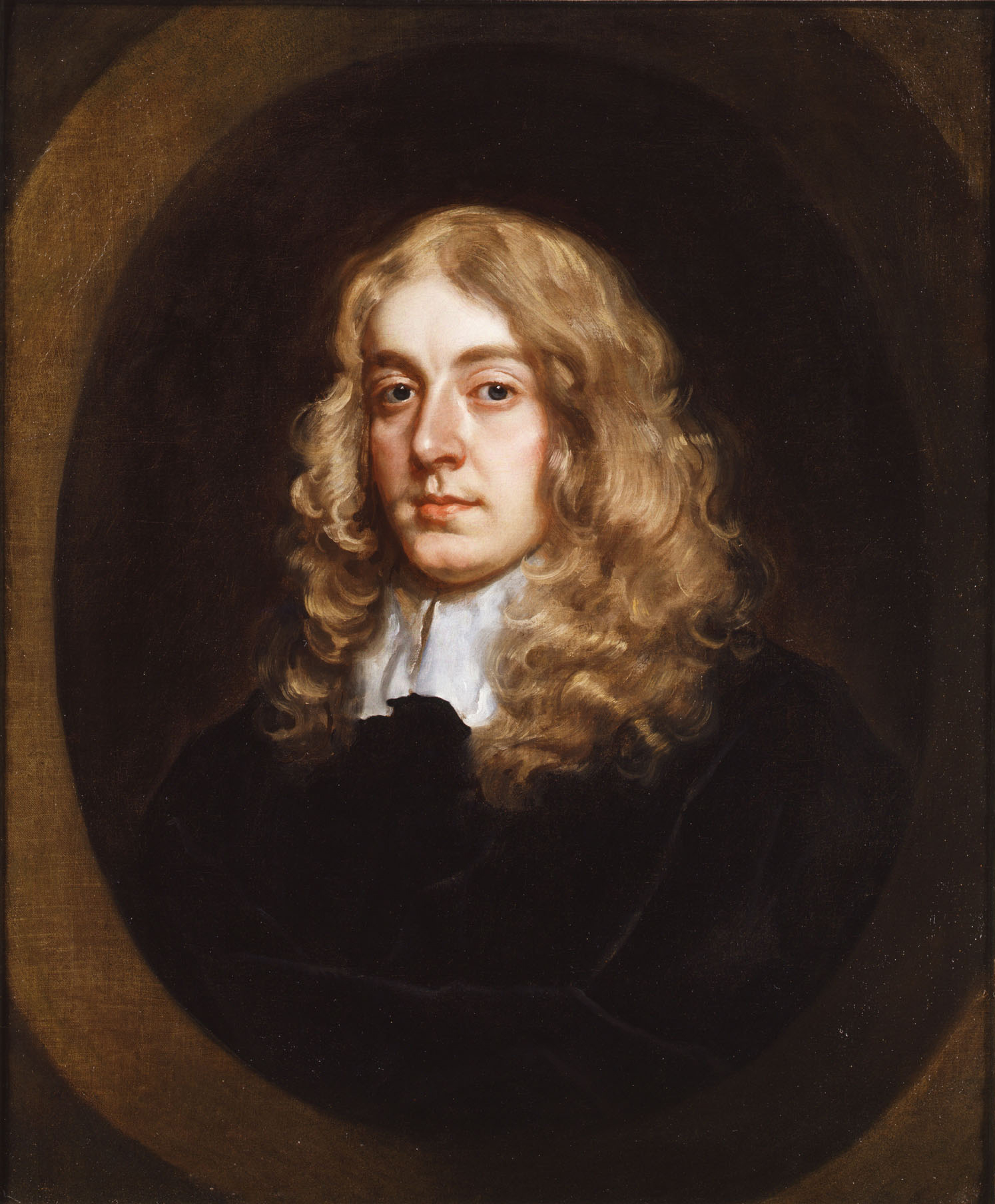
Sir Samuel Morland invented much of the secret British devices to read the mail undetected, and to send secret messages.

Henry Bennet, 1st Earl of Arlington, serving as the Secretary of State for the Southern Department, managed to regain State's control over the Post in 1667, appointing Joseph Williamson, the creator of the London Gazette, as his chief spymaster. Members of this intelligence team were mostly holdovers from Thurloe's intelligence staff; Isaac Dorislaus, Samuel Morland, and John Wallis.

Despite the fact that the Roundheads and the Royalists had targeted each other, they both shared other common and more dangerous enemies: the French, the Dutch, and the Spanish. While the British were secretly reading their diplomatic mails and diplomatic correspondences, those other great European powers were also reading those of the British. The Earl Arlington, desiring to be able to read European letters without detection, tasked Samuel Morland with the job.

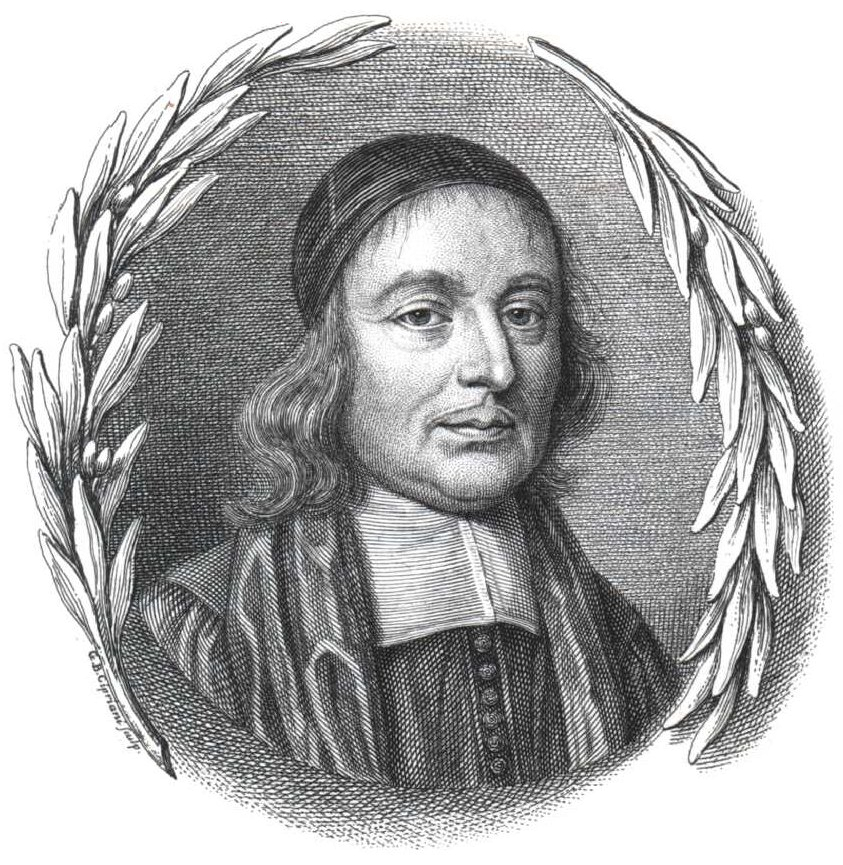
John Wallis did not hold any particular allegiances to the Roundhouses or the Royalists, and developed cryptanalysis and cryptography for their Post Offices simply because he enjoyed mathematics. The Earl Arlington arranged to pay him 50 guineas per quarter for his work.

Beginning around 1664, Morland worked off of espionage reports received from Spain to develop entirely new technologies and chemistries, and successfully demonstrated to Arlington and Williamson a letter that had been opened without leaving any signs – Arlington could not tell the difference. Morland pioneered many of the early methods of postal censorship, forgery of documents and wax seals, analytical chemistry, fiber orientation analysis and paper grain direction engineering, graphonomics and graphology, steganography, and cryptography. Samuel Morland is suggested to be one of the early inventors of modern pliable plastics, which he used in his wax seal forgeries. Morland operated his laboratory until the Great Fire of London burned his entire works. He was not able to rebuild his lab until the 1690s.

The practices of postal interception were formalized and outlined by Henry Coventry in 1677, in an exchange of letters to the Earl Arlington. Coventry, himself, had only just in 1676 been ordered by the King to perform such an interception mission against Edward Colman. In his letters to the Earl Arlington, he specified that even though he personally found the practice of reading private correspondences morally wrong, as long as it was done at the orders of the King, or at the King's "particular command," no other permissions were necessary.

== The Enquirers (1683–1816) ==
=== Richard Swift hires the first investigators (1683) ===
The first officeholder of Solicitor to the General Post Office was Gentleman Attorney Richard Swift, who took office in 1683. His office was principally responsible for: “the detection and carrying on of all prosecutions against persons for robbing the mails and other fraudulent practices.” He served in this office to at least 1713, when he was commended by HM Treasury as having "...all along acted with great diligence, faithfulness, and success."

He only worked three days a week, considered normal for his position at the time. He hired an unknown number of Clerks who served as what would later become known as The Enquirers.

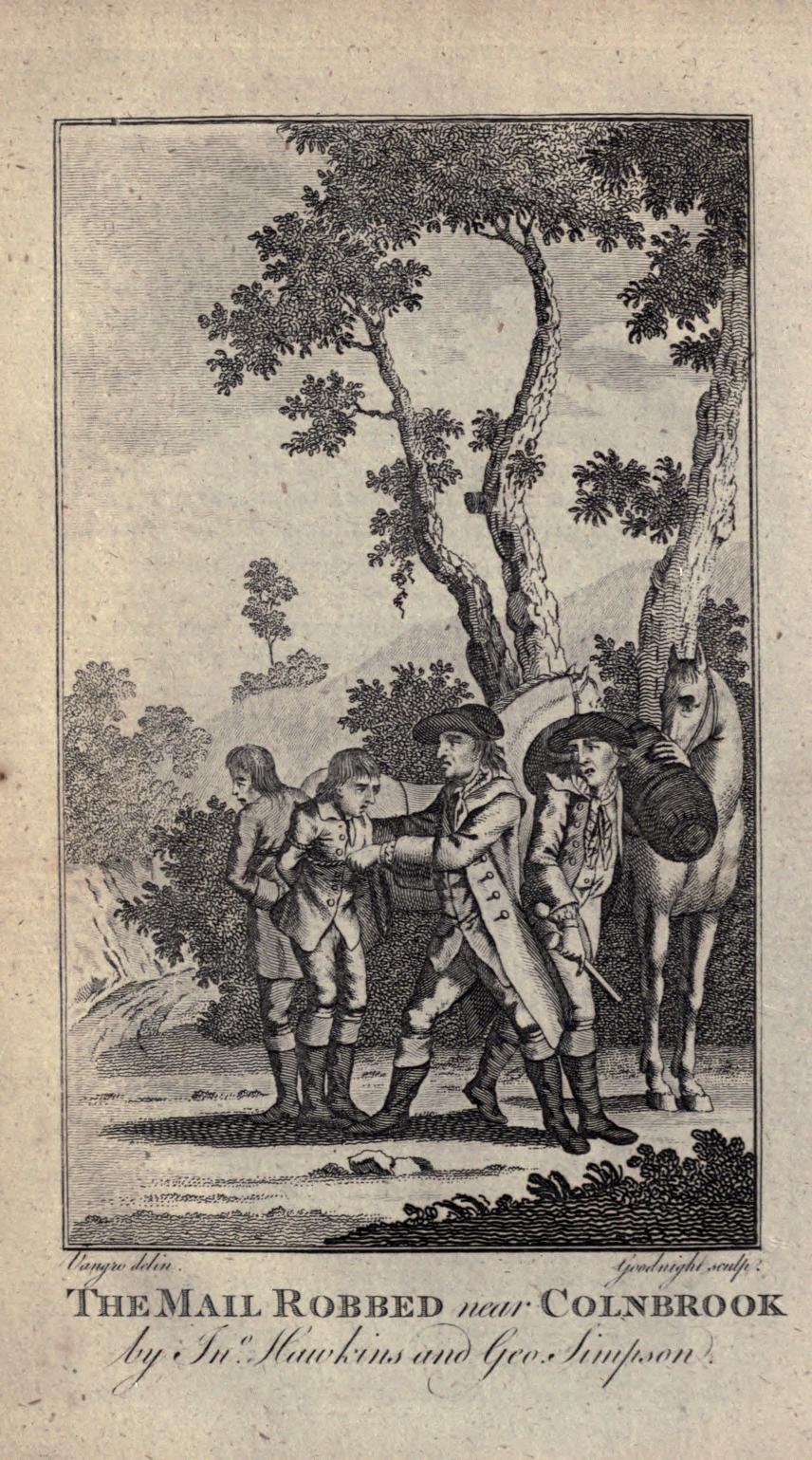
The notorious highwayman John Hawkins and his associate George Simpson depicted here robbing the postal carrier Thomas Green along the London to Bristol post route. They were executed in 1722.

The notorious mail robber and highwayman John Hawkins, wrote in a letter about his capture that: “I found two men whose countenances I did not like; it came to my head that they were The Enquirers.” Hawkins and his associate George Simpson were executed on 21 May 1722, hung by the neck until dead.

In 1765, an Act of Parliament ensured that a death penalty was received as standard for the following crimes related to letters, correspondence, and packages; theft, secreting, destruction of letters or packages, or embezzlement. The crime of obstructing the mail received a sentence of 6 months imprisonment.

During the American Revolutionary War, the General Post Office resumed the duties of secretly reading the mails of the rebellious Colonists. In response, the Colonists created their own security and police force for the security of their mail system, headed by William Goddard and Benjamin Franklin. That service is today known as the United States Postal Inspection Service (USPIS), the oldest continuing federal law enforcement agency in the United States, and the closest counterpart to POID.

In 1774, the Enquirers came at-odds with the office of the Commissioners of Customs over a scandal involving contraband goods being brought into Britain. The Enquirers investigated and discovered that local officers of Customs were being paid to pretend to make seizures of illegal goods at port, while allowing the bulk of those same shipments to be allowed into the country.

In 1788, Parliamentary Commissioners reported on behalf of the Treasury that they had discovered that the Solicitor at the time had hired an Assistant Solicitor named Antony Parkins in 1771, who was working without an official salary and only through legal charges and bills. The Commissioners further suggested that the current Solicitor was not carrying out his duties, and they were mostly being carried out by the Assistant Solicitor. They recommended to Parliament that people should only get paid if they actually do their job, and since Parkins was doing the Solicitor's job without a salary, that the Solicitor should be removed.

=== Antony Parkins is appointed Solicitor (1793) ===
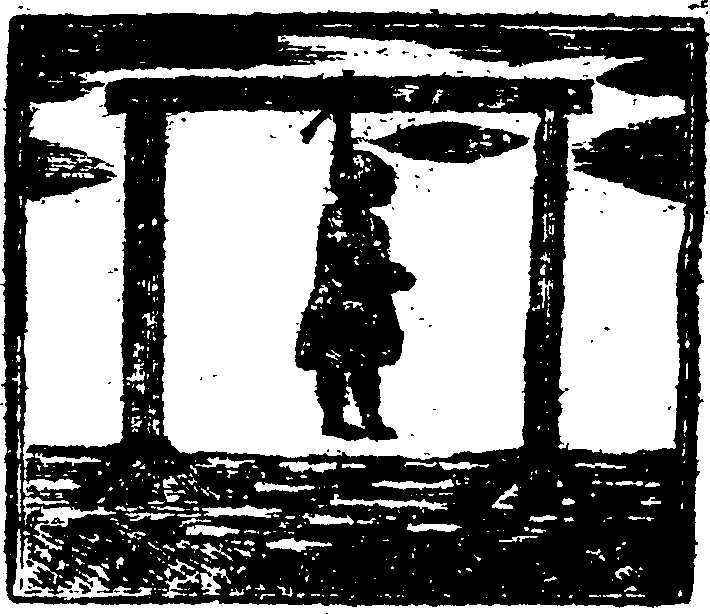
For almost a century, in cases involving the theft of the post or packages, The Enquirers pursued evidence which would secure the death sentence by hanging.

After a direct request for clarification from the Postmaster General, in a 1793 letter, Antony Parkins enumerated the law enforcement mechanisms of the Solicitor, the Assistant Solicitor and by extension, The Enquirers:

"[the] Duty is to detect, and carry on Prosecutions against Persons for robbing the Mails, against Clerks, Sorters, Letter Carriers and others, both in the Post Office in London and those of the Country, for offences committed in taking Bank Notes and Bills of Exchange out of Letters: and various other Fraudulent Practices: and I need scarcely observe to your Lordships that those sorts of offences being wholly unknown, until the Parties are either detect'd or in a way of being discovered, the most Instantaneous Exertions of the Solicitor, both by Night and by Day, are frequently unavoidably called for, and he of Necessity must cause every other Business or Engagement to give absolute way to this Important Duty, otherwise Public Justice might be defeated."

Parkins was then made the Solicitor. On the single day of 20 May 1795, three of the six men executed by hanging at the Old Bailey were postmen, and the fourth was a letter sorter named Evan Morgan.

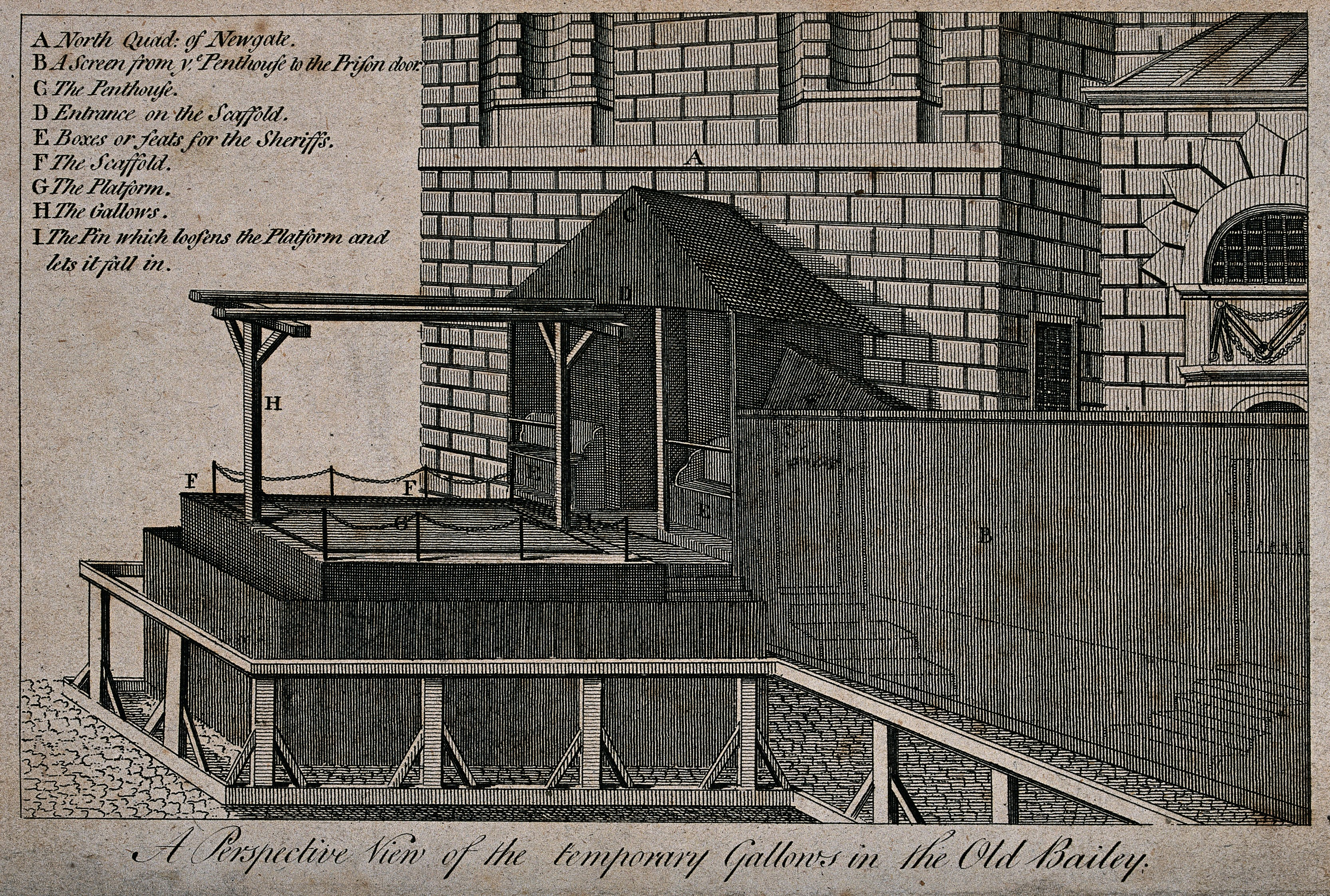
Public executions were relocated from Tyburn Tree to the Old Bailey, near Newgate Prison.

As it was written in the 1795 edition of The Newgate Calendar, robbing the mail was considered a serious offense to the people of Britain during the Eighteenth Century:

"Robbing the mail is a crime of so enormous a magnitude, that we are at a loss to find language in which to express our abhorrence of it. It is inconceivable what distress may be occasioned by the perpetration of a fact of this nature. Tradesmen men who expect remittances by the post may be ruined by their not arriving in time; and the bankruptcy of one may be the destruction of many. Hence, it is possible that hundreds of honest manufacturers and other dependents on shopkeepers, may suffer through the wickedness of one man who is base enough to rob the mail."

On 11 September 1811, the Postmaster of the Bath Post Office, Arthur Bailey, was executed at Ilchester for stealing a letter and check fraud. His photograph was previously on display at the former Bath Postal Museum.

The last postman in Britain to be hanged for theft of the post was in 1836. The death sentence was abolished with the passage of the Post Office Act 1837, which replaced it with transportation for a period 7 years to life. The Act also enumerated that the offense of tampering with the mail might be punishable by imprisonment with or without hard labour in the Common Gaol or House of Correction. Some lesser offeses, such as the theft of a newspaper, were only punishable by imprisonment.

=== The Mail Guard (1784–1874) ===
In 1874, a new position was begun, called the mail guard.

== Missing Letter Branch (1816–1883) ==
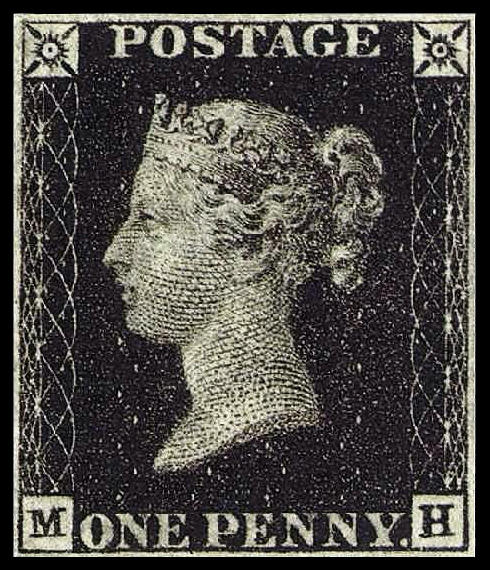
The Penny Black was introduced in 1840, and crime rates against the Post Office rose almost immediately.

The authority over The Enquirers shifted from the Solicitor's Office to the office of the Secretary to the General Post Office in 1816.

By at least 1823, Bow Street Runners were regularly seconded to the General Post Office to assist in investigations. Their secondments were then assumed by the Metropolitan Police in 1829, when that police force was created by Sir Robert Peel. Those secondments to the General Post Office, therefore, were effectively the first-ever active investigative assignments in the history of the Metropolitan Police.

=== The Penny Black ===
The Penny Black was introduced in 1840. This increased the workload of the Missing Letter Branch immeasurably; members of the public now had much easier and regular access to send postage, and traffic volumes rose greatly across the whole of Britain.

Due to the increase in postal crime as a result of the Penny Black's introduction, the office of the Inspector General of the Post (IG) was created in 1848. His office was given the authority over the Missing Letter Branch. However, the IG also created a more elite task force with joint duties shared by the Inland Office. The IG's office only lasted for a decade, being disbanded in 1858.

Travelling Officer – Travelling Officers were employed in this Branch to detect and investigate suspected crime against the PO. They were also involved in the prosecution of offenders.
~ The Postal Museum

The Missing Letter Branch was also reorganized that year, and the headquarters staff was increased by four Travelling Officers and two Assistant Constables.

=== Pillar boxes ===
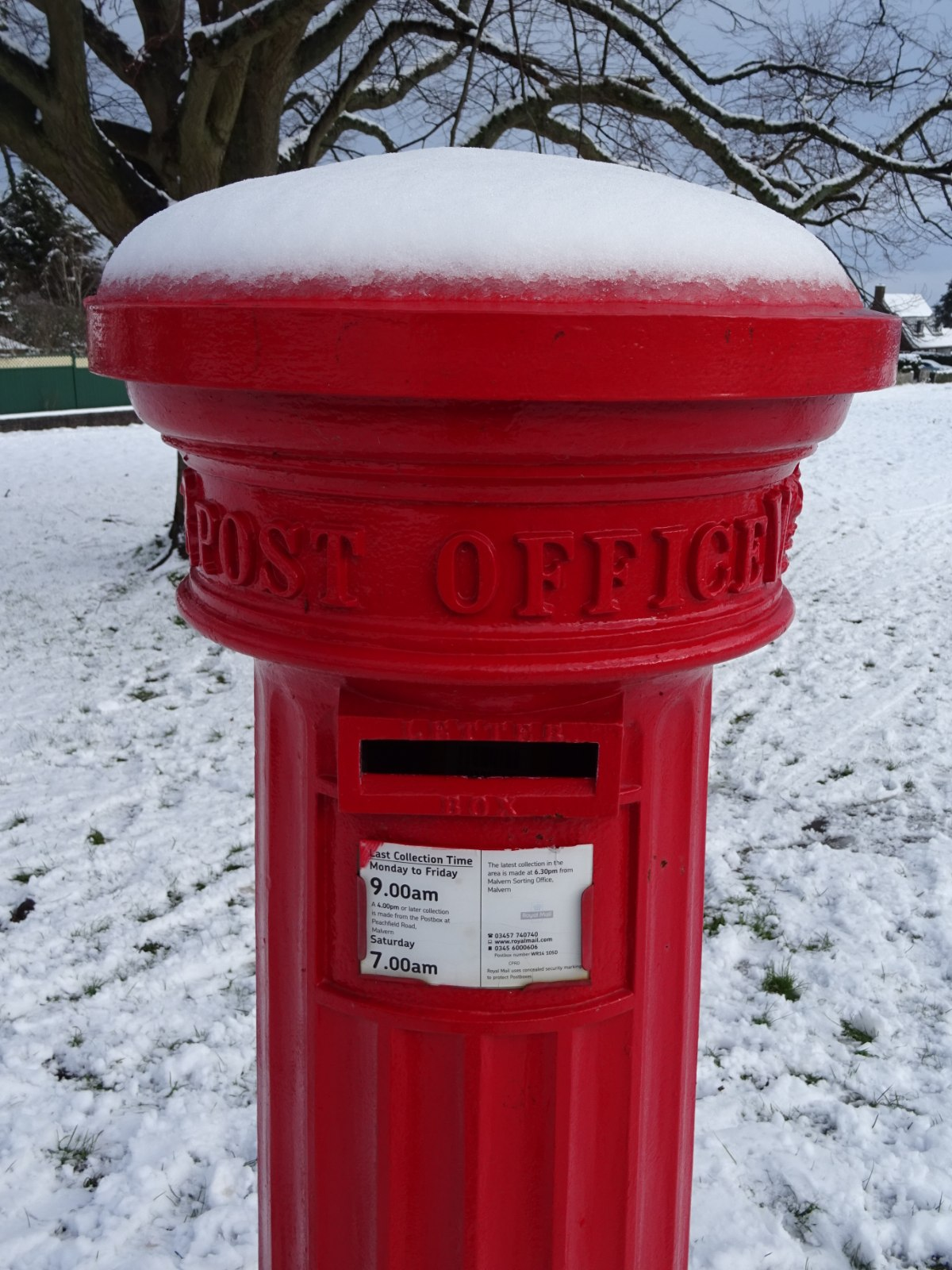
The pillar box was introduced in 1853, and became a direct target for thieves.

In 1853, the introduction of the pillar box saw an even higher uptick in mail volumes. Customers were now granted the ability to pre-purchase postage and to mail that envelope from any pillar box without needing to visit their Branch office. This took the strain off of post office clerks in the busier locations, but it also meant that pillar boxes became direct more targets for thieves.

=== Test letters ===
By at least the year 1858, "test letters," were introduced to catch thieves in the act. These were postage letters (most likely printed with invisible inks and/or watermarks) sent deliberately by the Missing Letter Branch through the post at or near locations where, using geographic triangulation, higher rates of theft had been reported. If that letter went missing, the investigators would match the time that it was sent and its intended route to those employees who would have handled it. However, the Branch had also realized that employees would rarely, if ever, steal mail from the routes they were assigned to.

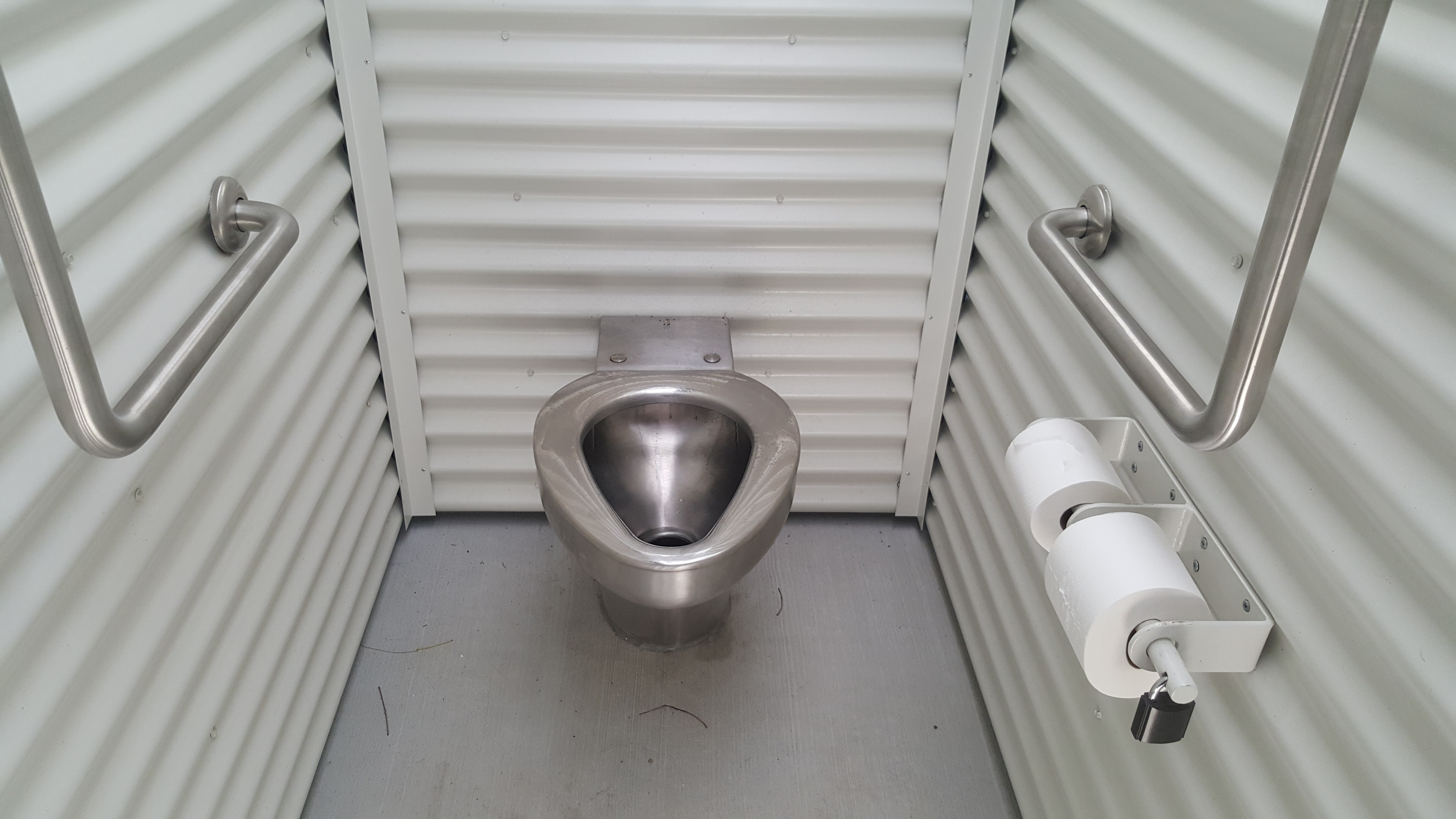
By the 1860s, the Missing Letter Branch discovered that employees who stole mail would usually try and open letters in the station toilets.

Writing about the form and function of test letters in 1908, Austin Philips wrote in The Strand Magazine:

"..the eldest child of the Confidential Inquiry Branch is the test letter... No test letter is ever sent at haphazard. So perfect is the machinery at headquarters that if, at any office in the United Kingdom, letters are going astray, it is possible, by means of system, built up and perfected through years of practical experience, for an investigating officer to put his finger on the pulse of the mischief and, sooner or later, to bring the offender to book."

When they were sent out, test letters were closely monitored at each interval. Enquirers would note the time and date that it passed certain areas between sorting and delivery. When the suspect was identified, they would be searched, and if the test letter was on them, they would be detained. If the suspect was indeed a postal employee, they would usually be searched in the toilets, where most suspects were inclined to search their own stolen letters.

Between 1859 and 1908, a total of 833 postal employees were tried in the Old Bailey for mail theft. The average jail time sentence around this time was 3 1/2 years. Between 1875 and 1908 throughout the whole of England and Wales, roughly 2700 postal workers were indicted for mail theft, and they were nearly all found guilty.

In the year 1860, the General Post Office had a turnover of £3.5 million and a revenue of £700,000. The new advancements in postal technology meant that by the end of the century, around the 1890s, turnover grew to £16.8 million and revenue grew to £3.4 million.

=== Increased workloads ===
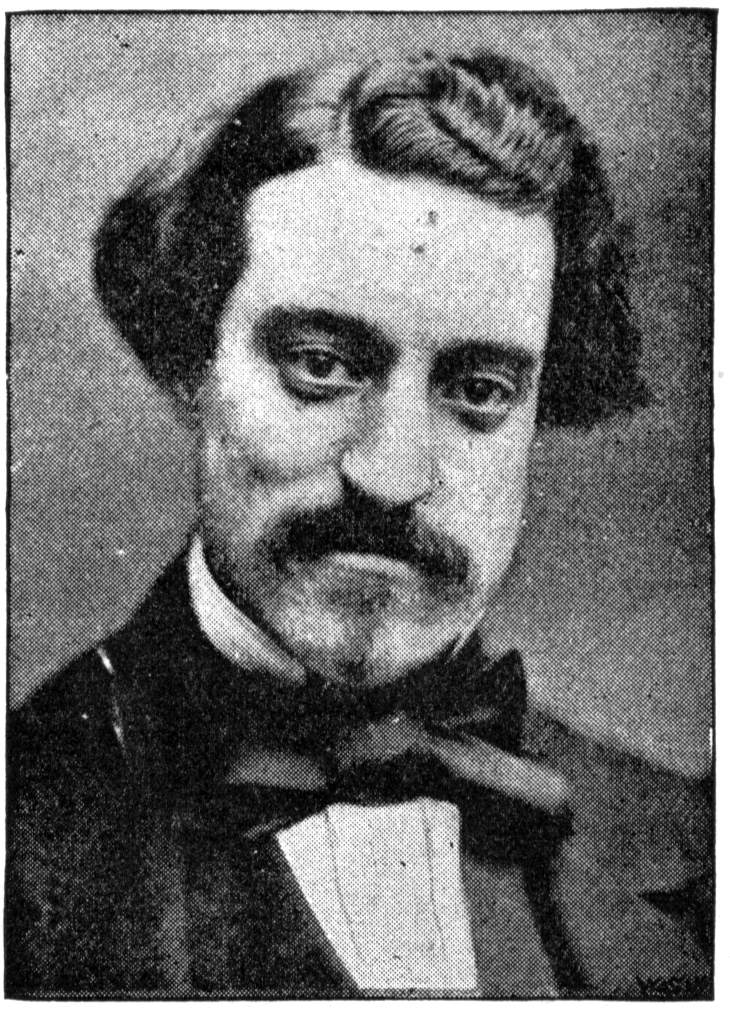
Edmund Yates served as the Director of the Missing Letter Branch for a decade.

Edmund Yates, who had joined the Missing Letter Branch in 1847 (as a clerk), in 1861 was made Director of the Missing Letter Branch. He worked here in this position for a full decade, until 1871. Also in 1861, the Post Office absorbed the newly established Savings Bank, which replaced the old Money Orders Department. This now meant that the post could contain even higher volumes of financial transactions, and its security was even more vital. Yates immediately authorized five Travelling Officers to be given permanent status at headquarters to assist with the increased workloads.

While Yates was serving as Director, in 1869, the Missing Letter Branch was reorganized yet again. A new position of Principal Travelling Officer was introduced that year, later Clerk for Missing Letter Business. In his memoirs, Yates writes that the reorganization caused his final two years in the Missing Letter Branch to become dull and monotonous, where before they had been filled with excitement.

== Post Office Cats and the War on Mice (1868–1984) ==
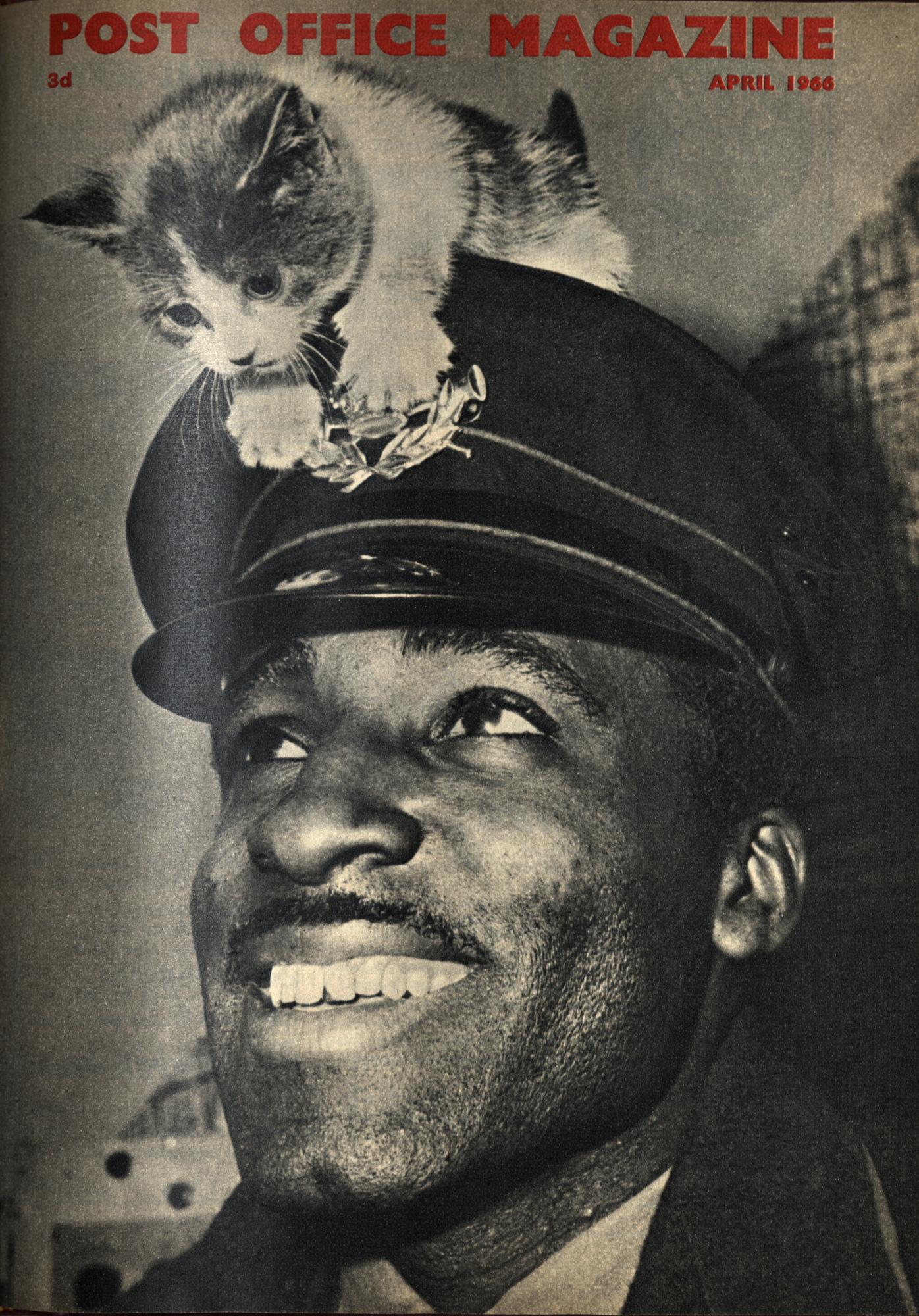
Post Office Cats were paid employees of the Post Office, and served on security duties for over a century.

Beginning in 1868, the staff at Post Office Headquarters were keen to keep the offices free from rodents, and especially from mice, who if left unchecked, could chew through mailbags and damage their contents. Mice were also keen on nesting in mailbags.

These offending rodents were issued, much like their human counterparts in years before, with the death sentence. To oversee the sentencing, the Money Order Office hired cats for the job, known as Post Office Cats.

The Money Order Office was especially concerned that rats were nesting in the money orders, cash, and other currencies kept in their offices. The Controller of the London Money Order Office at the time, Frederic Rowland Jackson, sent a suggestion to the Secretary of the Post Office, John Tilley, that they should add three cats to the payroll.

The cats would be left in the basement, most often, and trained to feed solely on mice for an initial six months probationary period. If mice populations were not reduced, the cats would be removed from their positions at the end of the six months.

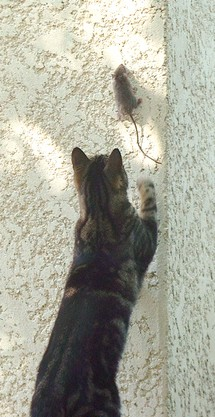
Post Office Cats were fierce soldiers on the frontlines of the Post Office War on Mice.

On 23 September 1868, Jackson wrote to Tilley:

"Traps and other means have to no purpose been used for the riddance of these vermin, and I beg to state that I have requested the resident porter, [James] Tye, to procure three cats for the purpose... I understand that 1½d (old) pence per day is usually allowed at the Museum and other places of this kind for each cat kept, and I propose that Tye should be allowed 2/- shillings per week for the keep and care of these cats."

Later on 23 September, Tilley responded:

"Three cats may be allowed on probation. They must undergo a test examination and should, I think, be females. It is important that the cats be not overfed and I cannot allow more than 1/- a week for their support. They must depend on the mice for the remainder of their emoluments and if the mice be not reduced in number in six months a further portion of the allowance must be stopped."

In 1873, they were awarded a pay raise of 6d per week. However, their wages remained stagnant until the 1950s, when members of the public, and especially Parliament, demanded that Post Office Cats should see wages increased requisite for inflationary causes.

Perhaps the most famous of these Post Office Cats was Tibs the Great, who served the office from 1950 to 1964, especially during the Post Office Cat wage scandal.

Technically, these cats were employed by the General Post Office overall, and were not recorded in the books as members of the Missing Letter Branch, or of the Enquiry Branch – but their careers were exceptionally aligned with those of the current RMGS, and are therefore considered predecessors to the modern security function.

The last Post Office Cat to hold office died in 1984. This cat's name was Blackie. The end of their service coincided with the introduction of rodent-resistant mailbags.

== Confidential Enquiry Branch (1883–1908) ==
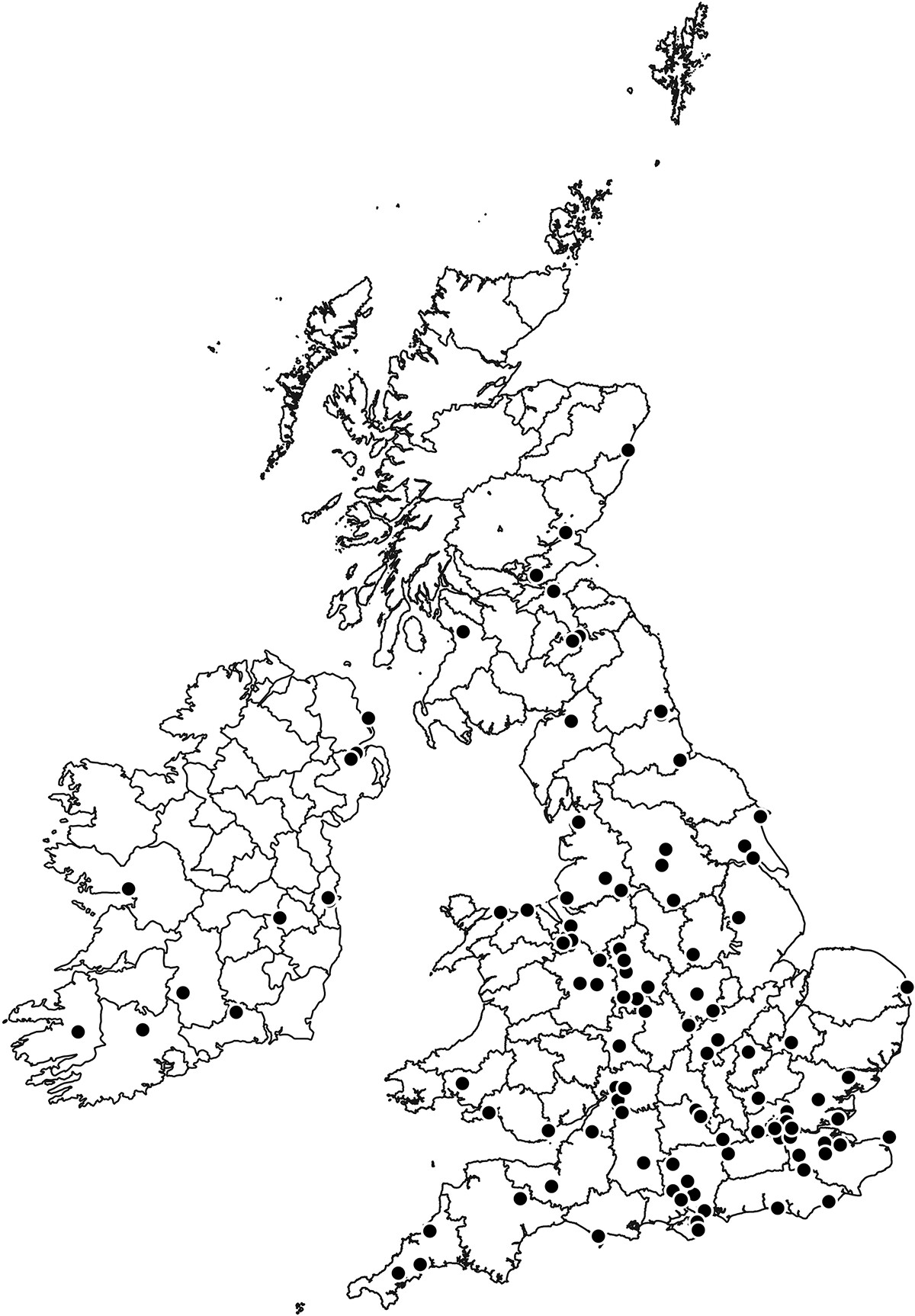
These are the locations of Confidential Enquiry Branch investigations for a 12-month period ending on 7 August 1895.

In 1881, the Post Office introduced postal orders to send smaller sums of money than normal money orders. However, because they were much cheaper to purchase, the volume of Postal Orders far outpaced the volume of traditional money orders. Over the next decade, over 778 million postal orders were issued by the Post Office, and they were issued throughout the entire British Empire. In the initial postal order years, only a few million pound sterling were sold, but by the year 1901, over £30 million were sold.

W. H. Mulock, serving as the Director of the Missing Letter Branch oversaw the process of its rebranding and reorganization as the Confidential Enquiry (also spelled Inquiry) Branch in 1883. Over the next ten years, an additional 16 travelling clerks were seconded as travelling officers for the Enquiry Branch, and they were assisted by an additional 16 Postal Police officers.

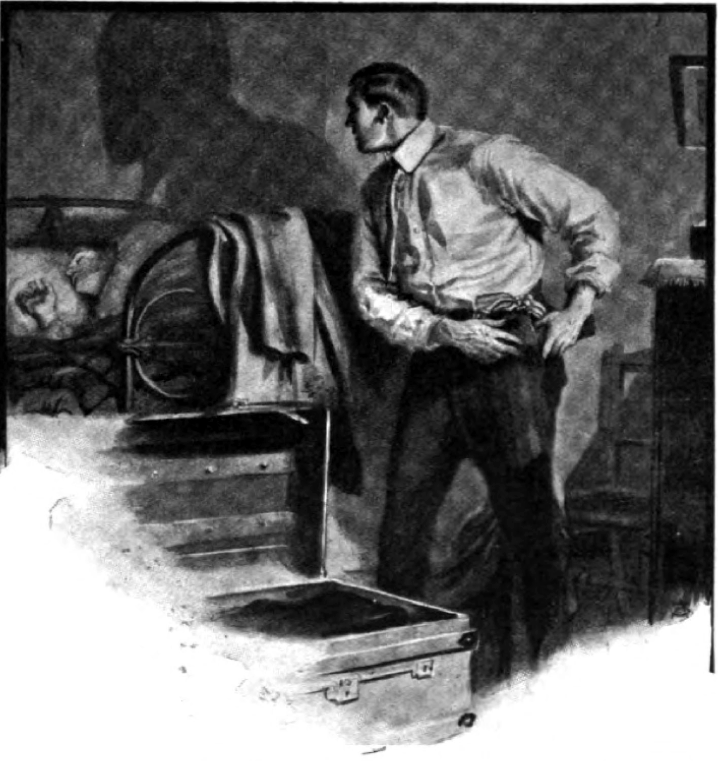
This drawing by Arthur Twidle which appeared in The Strand Magazine, depicts a postal worker armed with a pistol (pistols were standard-issue for all postmen) stealing from his coworker's tin box.

Investigations by this point had largely become systematized; a number of complaints would be received from the public about their mail going missing, and a traveling team of one clerk and one constable would be despatched to the nearest post office to those complaints. These investigations occurred through the whole of Great Britain and Ireland, at post offices in large cities or in rural villages.

Many people who stole mail were not employees of the Post Office, but there became a prevalent myth in British society that insiders, Post Office employees, were usually the first suspects because they often knew how to tell if an envelope or package contained cash or coinage.

The thing that made test letters so effective was that detectives were always watching them. Every single movement that a test letter made was monitored by a surveillance team of at least several people, trading off on shifts. There was no such thing as wireless tracking in these days, so investigators would often go on stakeouts with test letters.

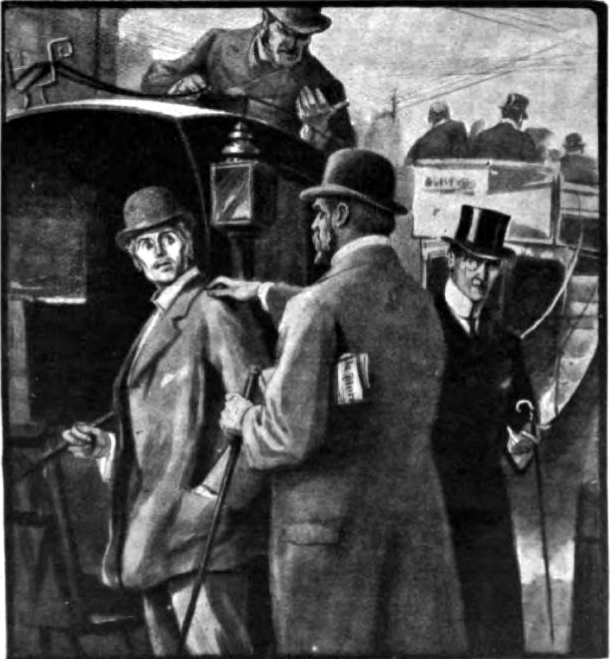
Here, Arthur Twidle depicts a plainclothes detective from the Confidential Enquiry Branch apprehending a suspect in the street.

Undercover work was often used, usually with clerks being implanted into the staff of the local post office to work alongside employees suspected of theft. Other detectives were then deployed to officially question the suspect's friends and coworkers to find their habits, especially to ascertain if they might have gambling debts. Employees of the post office were expressly forbidden to participate in gambling, for the lure that debts might cause one to steal postal orders or money orders.

When a suspect opened a test letter, they would searched – usually in the toilets, but sometimes in the middle of the street. Then, after a test letter was found on them, they would be brought to the Postmaster's room and questioned by detectives from the Branch.

In 1885, Robert Bradford, a postal investigator, launched an investigation into Mary Derry, the daughter of the postmaster at Burslem. At her trial, several hundred spectators filled the court gallery.

=== Cleveland Street Scandal ===
In 1889, Postal Constable Luke Hanks discovered from a London telegraph boy in the employ of the Post, that an illegal house of assignation at 19 Cleveland Street in Fitzrovia had been established, and was "offering" the prostitution of telegraph boys for a clientele of elite London men. This became known as the Cleveland Street Scandal, of which the Enquiry Branch was the lead investigating agency.

=== Birkenhead Murder ===
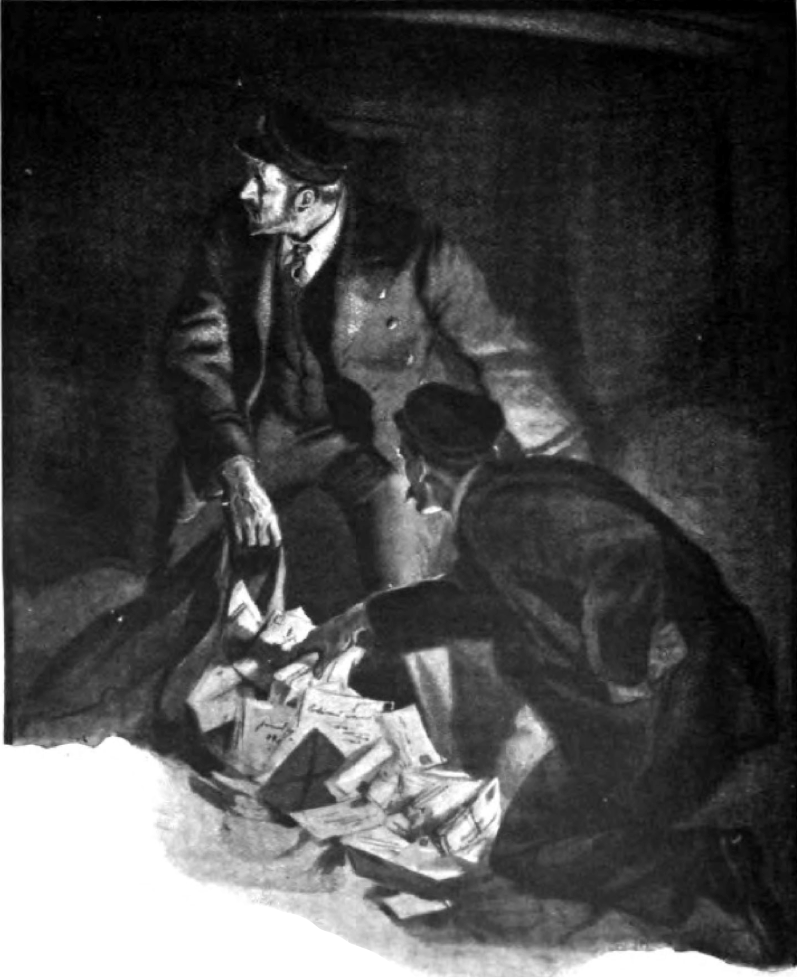
Arthur Twidle depicts the moment that the Confidential Enquiry Branch uncovered stolen envelopes containing cash and diamonds.

At the turn of the Century, it was normal for post offices to cease operations between the hours of 10am to 5pm on Sundays, and to be placed in the charge of a Post Office caretaker watchman, whose main job was to keep the doors locked. Returning to work at 5pm on 9 September 1900, the staff of the Birkenhead Post Office could not make contact with George Fell, the caretaker watchman.

The swinging doors of the sorting office were open, and there were pools of blood on the floor. More blood was found on the sorting boards. They discovered the safe door open, and the floor littered with opened envelopes. The counter flap door of the sorting office was damaged and splintered, from apparent signs of a struggle. Bloody fingerprints could be seen along the blinds of the windows.

They found George Fell's body in the Postmaster's room, lying on a hearthrug and covered with a green mailbag. His face had been repeatedly smashed, beyond the point of recognition. His body had been carried into the room by the murderer. The murder weapon – described as either an iron rod used for opening parcel baskets, or a fireplace poker – was lying next to his body and broken in half.

The case remains unsolved.

=== More reorganization ===
By 1901, the CEB was limited in scope and mandate to enquiries, while other duties were transferred to other branches under the command of the Secretary's Office. The Prosecution Division of the Solicitor's Office continued to manage prosecutions.

In 1904, a London mail sorter and representative from the Fawcett Association named Charles Durrant presented evidence to the Parliamentary Committee on Post Office Wages that test letters were an unfair practice. His argument was that postal workers were paid so little, and that test letters were forms of entrapment, because they were always filled with cash, coins, or money orders.

Despite that formal complaint, the practice of test letters, has continued into the 21st Century.

== Post Office Investigation Branch (1908–1967) ==
In 1908, the Confidential Enquiry Branch was renamed the Investigation Branch (IB).

In 1935, the IB became an administrative department within the Headquarters structure of the General Post Office.

In 1937, the recently departed Chief Investigator of the Investigation Branch, F. C. Cartwright, wrote in his memoir G-Men of the GPO:

"Although my profession has been in almost all respects similar to that of the men of the Criminal Investigation Department, it has been possible for me to avoid much of the publicity which falls to the lot of the Scotland Yard detective... I have taken a leading part in many strange criminal investigations without my activities being known to any, save those in my own Department... I may say that I am a little below average height and am spare of figure. Had I been of the accepted "detective type," he might not have been so unsuspecting."

When he did finally retire, F. C. Cartwright held the record for the longest-serving Postal Investigator at forty-six years of service, joining the Confidential Enquiry Branch at the age of fifteen, and being almost immediately charged with special investigation duties to find a mysterious package thief.

In 1946, the title of Director was changed to Controller.

=== The Great Train Robbery ===
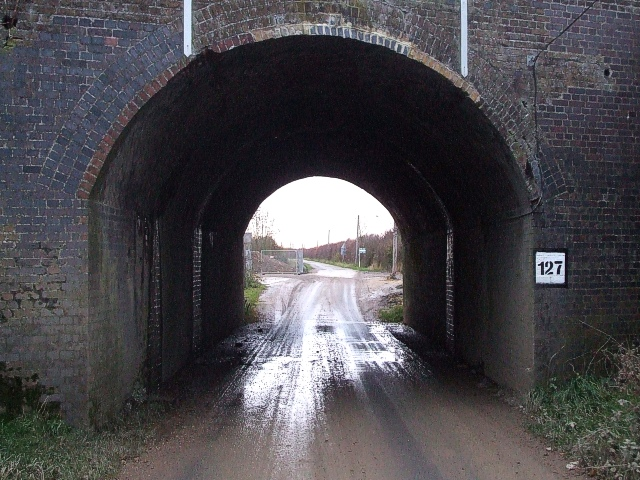
The events of the Great Train Robbery occurred here, at Bridego Bridge.

The Great Train Robbery occurred in 1963, and detectives of the Investigation Branch were deployed to the scene almost immediately, where they began a lengthy investigation as the jurisdictional authority over the local police.

== Post Office Investigation Department (1967–1996) ==
Briefly in 1967, the Investigation Branch changed its name to the Investigation Division, but was changed quickly to the Post Office Investigation Department (POID). The title of Controller was once again changed back to Director.

Detectives and Constables of POID were deployed with the approval of Parliament, the Home Office and the Courts.

In 1981, with the passage of the British Telecommunications Act 1981, The Post Office split off from British Telecommunications (BT). POID officers remained attached to BT until 1985, when BT was successful in establishing its own security branch.

== Post Office Security and Investigation Services (1996–1999) ==
In 1996, POID was dissolved, and was replaced by the Post Office Security and Investigation Services (POSIS). The Solicitor's Office was renamed Royal Mail Legal Services (RMLS).

In 1998, the POSIS investigator Andy Gardener lost his life in the line of duty while searching the premises of a postal employee named James Robinson. Robinson pulled a concealed shotgun and fired repeatedly at the three investigators searching his home. Gardener was hit twice and died.

== Royal Mail Group Security (1999–2012) ==
The turn of the Millennium saw drastic changes in the British postal system. The Post Office was officially renamed Royal Mail Group, where it oversaw the functions of the postal system reduced down to only four main functions: Royal Mail Letters, Post Office Limited, Parcelforce Worldwide, and General Logistics Services. Each of these functions formed individual security and investigative teams, all working under the umbrella of Royal Mail Group Security.

At the Royal Mail Group Centre, RMGS was established: "to provide strategic direction, governance and performance supervision, and maintain formal links with the Home Office and Ministry of Justice, Police and Law Enforcement Agencies and other Government departments."

Royal Mail Legal Services was conjoined with RMGS, and was recognized by the Ministry of Justice as a private prosecutor, and was authorized to pursue prosecutions in England and Wales.

By the year 2010, there were 287 investigators and security managers employed throughout the RMGS.These investigators had backgrounds in fields such as crime risk management and modelling, physical and electronic security, and behavioural security. They functioned under the authority of the Police and Criminal Evidence Act 1984, the Regulation of Investigatory Powers Act 2000, and the Postal Services Act 2000.

In Scotland, RMGS was authorized to report criminal activity to the Procurator fiscal. In Northern Ireland, RMGS reported to the Public Prosecution Service for Northern Ireland. These are the same exact processes that the police forces of those two countries are authorized.

Their rules and regulations were enumerated in the Royal Mail Group's Code of Business Standards and its Conduct Code.

== Royal Mail Group Security (2012–present) ==
After the passage of the Postal Services Act 2011, in 2012, the Royal Mail was fully privatized, and Post Office Limited was bifurcated from Royal Mail.

At the reorganized Post Office Limited, even though it remained a government company, POSIS was shuttered with the creation of the Post Office Security Team (POST), which in 2024 was renamed the Network Crime & Risk Support Team (NC&RST or NCRST). After the disastrous revelations during the Horizon Scandal, NCRST no longer maintains any law enforcement or prosecution function, only providing external security services.

Royal Mail Group Security, even though it is the security function of a privately traded company, Royal Mail, which is owned by International Distribution Services – is still technically considered a law enforcement agency, despite not having certain statutory powers. They still have many of the functions of a traditional police force, including the authority to launch investigations, access the Police National Computer, and prosecute against members of the public. RMGS is even allowed to interview suspects and search properties, but these are only authorized if the suspect volunteers. RMGS is required to seek local police assistance to make official arrests.

== See also ==
- United States Postal Inspection Service
- Hugh Finlay
- Dead Letter Office
