= Alexander Meyrick Broadley =

British barrister and historian (1847–1916)

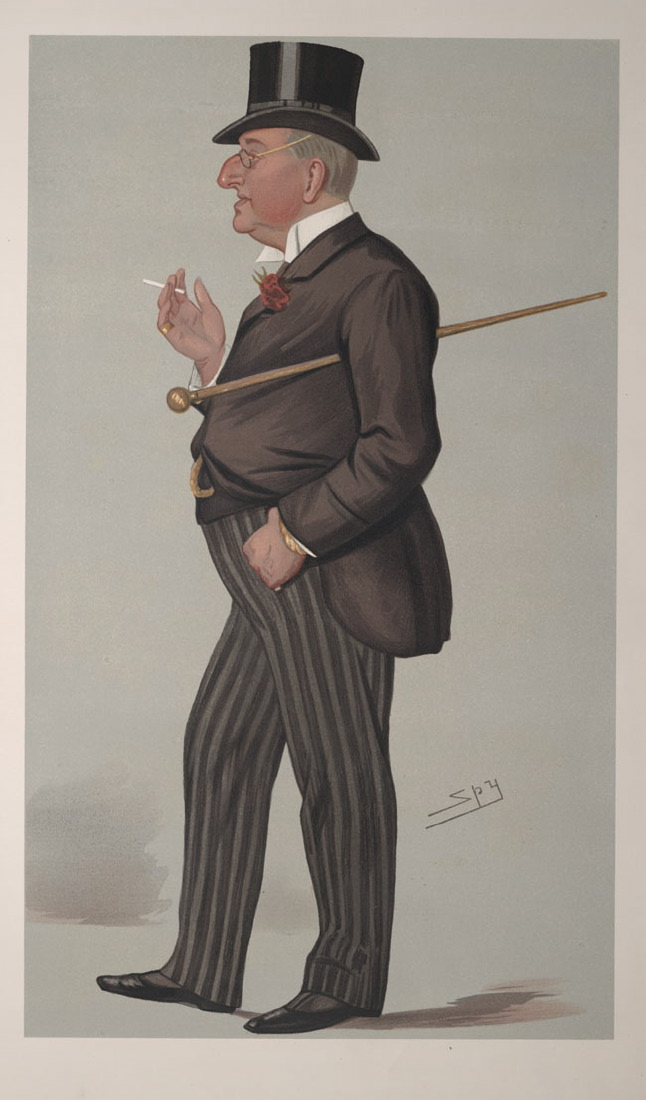
Vanity Fair caricature, 1889

Alexander Meyrick Broadley (19 July 1847 – 16 April 1916), also known as Broadley Pasha, was a British barrister, author, company promoter and social figure. He is best known for being the defence lawyer for Ahmed 'Urabi after the failure of the 'Urabi Revolt.

== Early life ==
Broadley was the son of the Rev. Alexander Broadley, vicar of Bradpole, in Dorset, and his wife Frances Jane, daughter of Thomas Meyrick of Pembroke. He was educated at Lord Weymouth's Grammar School, Warminster, and Marlborough Grammar School. He entered Lincoln's Inn as a law student in 1866 and after taking the examination to enter the Indian Civil Service, went in 1869 to India, where he became Assistant Magistrate and Collector of Patna, Bengal. In 1872 he conducted a survey of the ruins of the Nálanda monasteries at Burgàon, and formed a magnificent collection of sculptures from the region, going on to establish a museum for the collection. The colonial administrator and explorer Sir Harry H. Johnston noted that Broadley was "very orthodox on account of his father" and "was led into rude interruptions of any speech which traversed the belief that the Earth was only six or seven thousand years old".

In 1871 Broadley delivered a public lecture English Legislation for India. He also put forward the view that imprisonment for civil debts should be abolished.

In 1872 he spoke at a large meeting on education in Bengal, where he condemned the educational policy of the Indian Government. He was not punished, but later that year he spoke at a public meeting of the Dacca People's Association. His remarks on educational policy and on the Criminal Procedure Code, which were reported in newspapers and created angry discussions, were objected to by the Lieutenant-Governor of Bengal, Sir George Campbell and officially denied. Broadley applied for leave, which Campbell rejected, demanding an explanation.

In May 1872 it was reported that charges of a serious nature had been brought against Broadley: he was suspended and sent to Patna pending an investigation. The following month he was reported to have been posted to Noynabad, and ordered to remain there, having been invested with the power to try cases arising from riots of the Muslim Ferazi sect. In November the Calcutta Gazette reported him as being officially on leave and transferred to Chittagong by Campbell's order. When a warrant for his arrest for homosexual offences was issued, Broadley absconded. One report stated that "his reputation was known to every Englishman who ever lived in India", and his presence was taboo in European clubs in Malta and Egypt.

Due to the scandal he was unable to return immediately to England. He moved to Tunis, where he worked as a lawyer and as a correspondent for The Times. One of his clients was the Bey of Tunis. He also became influential in freemasonry, founding the prestigious Drury Lane Masonic Lodge, which is likely to have aided his social rise. In 1882 he published The last Punic war. Tunis, past and present, which drew admiring reviews, Vanity Fair writing: "If Mr. Broadley's book on Tunis were only read by all citizens who influence the policy of Ministers, I question very much whether anything like our Egyptian crime could be repeated. The dullest would see how far we have been led".

Given Broadley's knowledge of Muslim law, and the fact he was "abnormally clever", that same year Wilfrid Blunt engaged him as counsel for Ahmed ʻUrabi, otherwise known as Aribi Pasha, an Egyptian nationalist who was put on trial in Cairo for insurrection. Broadley forced the compromise which enabled Pasha and his companions to be sent as pensioners to Colombo. Broadley was paid 10,000 guineas, and was henceforth nicknamed 'Broadley Pasha' by his friends, the press, and English Society.

== Return to England ==
Following the trial Broadley returned to England as the agent and legal adviser of the ex-Khedive Ismail. His social skills also saw him appointed de facto editor of Edmund Yates' periodical World, and despite his previous disgrace, for a few years he achieved an exceptionally high profile in London Society. "He knew everyone in London and all paid court to him." Of his 40th birthday party in 1887 one newspaper recorded: "Princes and princesses, peers and peeresses, bishops and baronets, diplomatists and doctors, members of Parliament and musicians, authors and artists, actors and actresses availed themselves of the opportunity of offering birthday congratulations".

An Indian official suggested that Broadley had not been compelled to return to India to answer the charges against him, as such a threat hanging over the head of the editor of an important society newspaper guaranteed that he would not publish anything of embarrassment to those in high places.

Of "Falstaffian proportions", Broadley was described as "that strange being…who, amongst other avocations, acts as a sort of social broker 'for bringing together people who would not otherwise meet' ". According to one report "he had the faculty of attaching himself to and 'running' whomsoever was the most amusing and useful person of the hour". They included the 'nitrate king' John Thomas North and would-be national leader General Georges Boulanger. It was at Broadley's Regents Park home, Cairo Cottage at 2 Beta Place, that Boulanger made his London debut. Broadley also became connected with the management of the Theatre Royal, Drury Lane, acting as a financial and business adviser to Augustus Harris.

Broadley's social ascendency continued until 1889 when his portrait by Spy appeared in the magazine Vanity Fair. Edward VII, then Prince of Wales, whose sons' portraits had also appeared in the magazine, and who had knowledge of Broadley's reputation in India, took offence at his inclusion. After making enquiries at Scotland Yard, the magazine's owner Edmund Yates dismissed Broadley, and published an apology. Broadley was told to leave the country within 12 hours. The reason was not just the earlier scandal in India: Broadley was implicated as a client of the male brothel at the centre of the Cleveland Street Scandal. With the Prince of Wales' equerry involved, and rumours also connecting his eldest son, the Prince was reported to be "in a very stern and unbending mood." Said one newspaper report: "Everybody knows it was H.R.H. caused Broadley Pasha's extinction." Le Figaro later alleged that Broadley had taken Boulanger and his propagandist Henri Rochefort to the brothel; the allegation was dismissed by Boulanger's right-hand man Count Dillon. On the witness stand the rentboy John Saul stated that he had briefly secured employment in the 1889 production The Royal Oak at Drury Lane, which was during Broadley's time there.

== Exile ==
Broadley moved to Paris and then Brussels, where he edited the English language newspaper The Belgian News. In August 1890 it was reported of Broadley that "he has been guilty here of all the practices charged to him and others in Cleveland Street. His last line of operations was to invite young boys and scholars attending school to his rooms to supper." One of the boys informed his mother of the lavishness of these meals provided by a "benevolent old gentleman", which included "stupefying cordials". Broadley was placed under police surveillance. In 1891 he was reported to be 'loafing' in Tunis with fellow Cleveland Street exile Lord Arthur Somerset.

Broadley's ability to reinvent himself provoked a mockingly Wildean paragraph in a British syndicated newspaper column in 1892, which stated that in Brussels he had "renewed his youth" and was:

...in the widest sense "a new man". He in fact insists that he is a disconnected and different Mr Broadley altogether from the gentleman whose adventures while in the service of the Indian Prison department finally excited so much curiosity in London; denies that there was ever such a person as himself, that his portrait ever appeared in Vanity Fair, or that an exalted personage ever intervened fiercely in his affairs. The English colony in Brussels is now divided into two contending camps. One section insists that Mr Broadley is the Mr Broadley, and therefore impossible and insufferable. The other protests that their Mr Broadley, who it appears enjoys the friendship and esteem of the King of the Belgians, is fitted to grace any society in which he may find himself."

It was subsequently reported that to confirm his identity, the English Club of Brussels went to the trouble of procuring the back number of Vanity Fair which had featured the infamous portrait.

== Final return to England ==
In 1894, Broadley quietly returned to England to manage the estates and general affairs of Viscount Cantelupe, who succeeded in 1896 as 8th Earl de la Warr. In April 1896 Broadley met the serial financial fraudster Ernest Terah Hooley, and subsequently worked to promote his investment schemes. Newspaper reports alleged Broadley was "a brilliant financier" and Hooley was merely his ventriloquist's dummy. Later in court Broadley freely admitted that he advised Hooley on nearly all his projects.

Hooley purchased Anmer Hall estate, adjoining Sandringham in 1896. Through an intermediary the Prince of Wales requested that he be allowed to purchase the estate from Hooley, ostensibly for his daughter Maud, to which Hooley agreed. It has been alleged that the real reason for the Prince's action was to avoid the possibility of Broadley becoming a constant visitor to the estate, and hence near-neighbour.

In 1898, Hooley was made bankrupt. In the Bankruptcy Court, Broadley appeared with Earl de la Warr and two other gentlemen. They were charged with contempt of court in attempting to bribe Hooley to alter his testimony to protect the Earl. Broadley was found guilty of insubordination and perjury and ordered to pay costs. Public opinion considered the treatment of Broadley by the judge very lenient. "Broadley made a beautiful witness", one report suggested, "brimming over with benevolence and pathos. He threatened to commit suicide, too, unless Hooley did something or other, and Hooley seems to have believed him..." Hooley stated on the witness stand that Broadley had intercepted money intended for others, and that he had made a further £80,000 acting as Hooley's promoter, accusations Broadley denied.

With Broadley again the subject of publicity, in the House of Commons the Home Secretary was asked by a parliamentarian whether Broadley was the same person against whom there was an outstanding warrant for a criminal offence in India, did such warrants apply in England, and if so, why had it not been actioned. The reply was that they did apply, but that he had no other information on the matter.

Broadley was denounced by Robert Wright, Justice of the Court of the Queen's Bench, as the real author and organiser of Hooley's deceitful schemes, but escaped bankruptcy and fashioned himself as a country gentleman. He retreated to his home village of Bradpole, Dorset, building a picturesque towered mansion, The Knapp.

== Last years ==
The last fifteen years of Broadley's life were devoted to writing and book collecting, Napoleon and his age being at the heart of it, but also a large collection of works on criminal jurisprudence. He made significant acquisitions of manuscript material, accumulating original letters and documents, as his book Chats on Autographs related. His library included 135 works he had "grangerized" by adding additional illustrations, amounting to about 600 volumes. He also became a prolific author of books on historical topics. In 1906 he even penned a work on the boyhood of his nemesis Edward VII titled The Boyhood of a Great King. It drew at least one scathing review under the headline 'Scissors and Snobbery' which stated: "this stitching together of stale tattle from the Royal nursery may be 'good business': it is not an undertaking which enlists our sympathy. Mr Broadley's record as an ex-Indian Civilian, ex-barrister, ex-journalist, and ex-company promoter is well known. This volume does not alter our estimate of the writer or the man."

Broadley also became a great supporter of the Bath Historical Pageant, including appearing one year as Beau Nash, when he was recorded as holding 'kingly sway' and was "pre-eminently the great success of the ball".

In 1911 Broadley made a pilgrimage with friends over the route followed by Charles II during his wanderings in late 1651, and wrote a history The Royal Miracle, an interest sparked by the play The Royal Oak.

Never married, Broadley died, in the middle of the First World War, on 16 April 1916 in Gerrards Cross, Buckinghamshire.

By the time of his death, Broadley's crimes had been largely forgotten, and his obituary in The Times and those elsewhere made no mention of them. This prompted novelist and U.S. newspaper columnist Marguerite Cunliffe-Owen to restate them with the observation: "Of course all this is old and forgotten, and if I recall it, it is merely in order to show how very unreliable obituaries are apt to be, and the facility with which even such men as Broadley, if possessed of sufficient cleverness, and of impudence, are able to blind their citizens to their past infamies and to die in the odor of respectability, if not of sanctity"

== Legacy ==
In his will, Broadley left the sum of £8,506, the majority bequeathed to his nephew Lieutenant R.A.L. Broadley, who put his collection up for sale; the Napoleana was purchased en bloc by Lord Curzon, who bequeathed it to Oxford University. It now resides in the Bodleian with 332 of his grangerized books. Other repositories of his grangerized volumes include the Theatre Collection at Westminster City Archives, which holds four scrapbooks Annals of the Haymarket (1911), and the Royal Society, which owns a multivolume copy of Charles Richard Weld's History of the Royal Society.

The contents of Broadley's museum in Bihár have been relocated to the collections of the Indian Museum in Kolkata.

His country seat in Bradpole has been subdivided: The Knapp is now St James' Nursing Home, and its former gatehouse is a separate residence.

A phonograph recording of Broadley delivering a toast in 1888 to Edmund Yates and Arthur Sullivan survives.

== Works ==
- English Legislation For India, 1871
- Ruins of the Nálanda Monasteries at Burgáon, subdivision Bihár, Zillah Patna. Calcutta: Bengal Secretariat Press. 1872.
- The last Punic war. Tunis, past and present; with a narrative of the French conquest of the regency. W. Blackwood and sons. 1882.
- Le général Boulanger. A Duquesne. 1887.
- Doctor Johnson and Mrs Thrale: Including Mrs Thrale's unpublished Journal of the Welsh Tour Made in 1774 and Much Hitherto Unpublished Correspondence of the Streatham Coterie. London: John Lane The Bodley Head. 1909.
- How we Defended Arábi and His Friends: A Story of Egypt and the Egyptians (second ed.). London: Chapman and Hall. 1884.
- Alexander Meyrick Broadley; Rose, John Holland (1908). Dumouriez and the Defence of England Against Napoleon. London: J. Lane.
- Alexander Meyrick Broadley; Harold Felix Baker Wheeler (1908). Napoleon and the Invasion of England: The Story of the Great Terror.
- Napoleon in Caricature 1795-1821. London: John Lane. 1911.
- The History of Freemasonry in the District of Malta. London: George Kenning. 1880.
- The Two Scribbling Mrs P.P.s: The Intimate Letters of Hester Piozzi and Penelope Pennington, 1788-1821, 6 vols, ed. Oswald Knapp, Collected and arranged by A.M. Broadley. The Knapp. 1914.

== Bibliography ==
- Blunt, Wilfred (1922). Secret History of the English Occupation of Egypt. Knopf.
- Carter, Mia (2003). Archives of Empire: Volume I. From The East India Company to the Suez Canal. Duke University Press.
- Couvreur, Jessie (Tasma) (1995). Clarke, Patricia (ed.). Tasma's Diaries: The Diaries of Jessie Couvreur with Another by Her Young Sister Edith Huybers. Canberra: Mulini Press.
- Stratmann, Linda (2010). Fraudsters and Charlatans: A Peek at Some of History's Greatest Rogues (The Crooks Who Conned Millions). The History Press.
