= Edmund Yates =

British journalist, novelist and dramatist (1831–1894)

Edmund Hodgson Yates
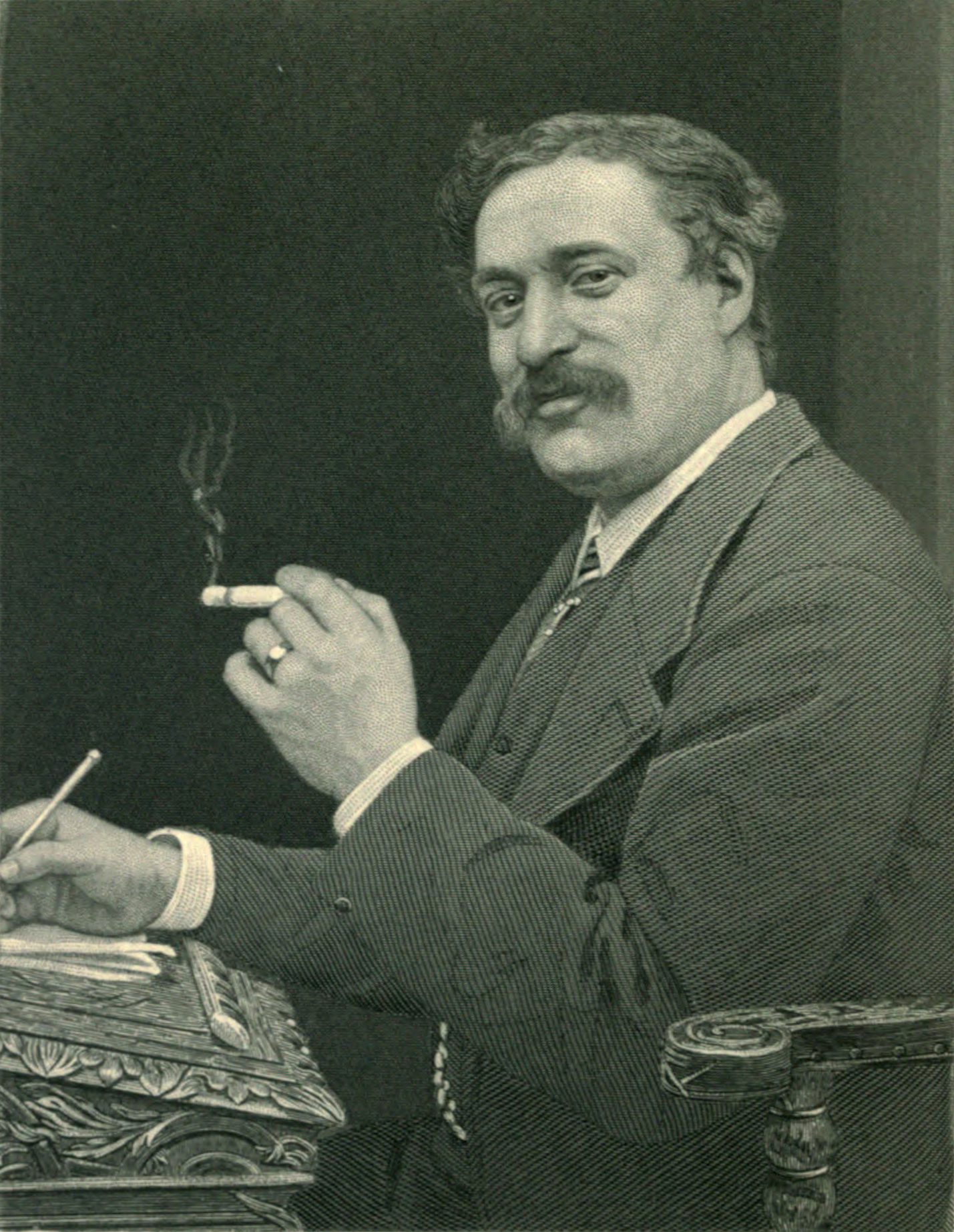
- Born: 3 July 1831; Edinburgh, Scotland
- Died: 20 May 1894 (aged 62)
- Occupations: Journalist; novelist; playwright

Edmund Hodgson Yates (3 July 1831 – 20 May 1894) was a British journalist, novelist and dramatist.

== Early life ==
He was born in Edinburgh to the actor and theatre manager Frederick Henry Yates and was educated at Highgate School in London from 1840 to 1846, and later in Düsseldorf. His first career was a clerk in the General Post Office, becoming in 1862 head of the missing letter department, and where he stayed until 1872. Meanwhile, he entered journalism, working on the Court Journal and then Daily News, under Charles Dickens.

In 1854 he published his first book My Haunts and their Frequenters, after which followed a succession of novels and plays. As a contributor to All the Year Round and Household Words, he gained the high opinion of Dickens, who was a friend; in the 1850s, Yates lived at No. 43 Doughty Street, London, close to Dickens's former home at No. 48, which is now the Charles Dickens Museum.

== Journalism career ==
In 1858 Yates was made editor of a new paper called Town Talk. His first number contained a laudatory article on Dickens, and the second a disparaging one on Thackeray, containing various personal references to private matters. Thackeray brought the article before the committee of the Garrick Club, of which he contended that Yates had made improper use, and the result was that Yates was expelled from the club. Besides editing the magazine Temple Bar and Tinsley's Magazine, Yates during the 1860s took to lecturing on social topics, and published several books, including the novel Black Sheep (1867). In the Morning Star, under the heading of "Le Flâneur", he continued the sort of column which he had inaugurated in the Illustrated Times. On his retirement from the Post Office he went to the United States on a lecture tour, and afterwards, as a special correspondent for the New York Herald, travelled through Europe.

Back in London, Yates was perhaps best known as proprietor and editor, under the pen-name of "Atlas", of The World society newspaper, which he established in 1874 with Eustace Clare Grenville Murray, and which for a time was edited by Alexander Meyrick Broadley. The World, which was perceived as a newspaper chronicling upper class London Society, was a pioneer in "personal journalism", such as the interview, which was later adopted by newspapers generally. He met Violet, Lady Greville at a party where he shared his patronising approach to her and her type. She revealed that she was the anonymous writer from whom Yates had been requesting work for the last two years. Prompted by Yates's surprise that she was not a man, she decided to write under her own name in future.

In 1885 he was sentenced to four months' imprisonment for libelling Lord Lonsdale, yet in later life enjoyed a second career as a county magistrate.

Yates was also the author of, and performed in, Invitations at Egyptian Hall, London, which ran in 1862–1863. The work was a highly successful comedy in which he and Harold Littledale Power posed as hosts to a variety of singers and actors. Power also performed songs and imitations.

Edmund Yates wrote his autobiography titled Edmund Yates, His Recollections and Experiences, the first edition of which was published by Richard Bentley and Son in 1884.

== Assessments ==
Marie Corelli wrote of him: "Too hastily judged by some, and maligned by others, he was to those who recognised his real character 'a man among men' – a frank friend, an equally frank foe, and an open hater of all things mean and false and hypocritical." According to the Encyclopædia Britannica Eleventh Edition, "He had been the typical flâneur in the literary world of the period, an entertaining writer and talker, with a talent for publicity of the modern type—developed, no doubt, from his theatrical parentage—which, through his imitators, was destined to have considerable influence on journalism."

== Works ==
- After Office-Hours (1861)
- Running the Gauntlet (1865)
- For Better, for Worse (1864)
- Broken to Harness: A Story of English Domestic Life (1864)
- The Business of Pleasure (1865)
- Land at Last (1866)
- Kissing the Rod (1866)
- The Forlorn Hope (2v., 1867)
- The Rock Ahead (1868)
- Wrecked in Port (2v., 1869)
- A Righted Wrong (1870)
- Dr. Wainwright's Patient (2v., 1871)
- The Yellow Flag (1872)
- A Waiting Race (2v., 1872)
- Castaway (2v., 1872)
- Nobody’s Fortune (2v., 1872)
- The Yellow Flag (2v., 1873)
- The Impending Sword (2v., 1874; sometimes cited as Impeding)
- Two by Tricks (1874)
- Black Sheep (1874)
- A Silent Witness (2v., 1875)
- Going to the Bad (1876)

Strangely enough, most of Yates's works, although they appeared in English, were apparently originally published in Leipzig, Germany.
