= Arthur Twidle =

English painter

Arthur Twidle (1864 to 26 April 1936) was an English illustrator and artist best known for his illustrations of Arthur Conan Doyle's Sherlock Holmes books.

Born in Rotherhithe, Surrey, in 1864, Arthur Twidle was the son of Alfred Twidle (a journeyman cooper and his wife Rachel (née Smith), who had married in 1855. In 1881, following the death of his mother, Twidle was living with an uncle and his occupation was described as draughtsman in wood.

In 1885, Twidle married Annie Elizabeth Mason at St. Olave, Southwark. In 1891, the family—now including Annie Elizabeth (b. 1887) and Arthur (b. 1888) -- were living in Dulwich.

On the death of Sidney Paget, who had illustrated Conan Dolyle's Sherlock Holmes stories in The Strand magazine, Twidle became one of Doyle's regular artists. He illustrated many of Doyles's later works including the Doyle 'Author's Edition'. Over many years, Twidle's illustrations appeared in Annie S. Swan's Magazine, The Strand, The Red Magazine, the Girl's Own Paper, and elsewhere. He was a prolific illustrator for the Boy's Own Paper, particularly of historical subjects. He also illustrated for the Religious Tract Society and Frederick Warne & Co.

In 1901 and 1911 he was living at Foots Cray, Kent, England.

Towards the end of his life Arthur moved to 6 Ivy Mill Lane, Godstone Surrey. The conveyance is dated 25 August 1925. He built a large artist's studio in the back garden which still has a painting of his painted directly onto one wall.

According to a brief obituary in The Times, "Mr. Twiddle did most of his work in black-and-white and water-colour he exhibited paintings in oils at the Royal Academy and was well known for his mural paintings, panels and pastels."
