= Mail robbery =

Theft of mail during delivery

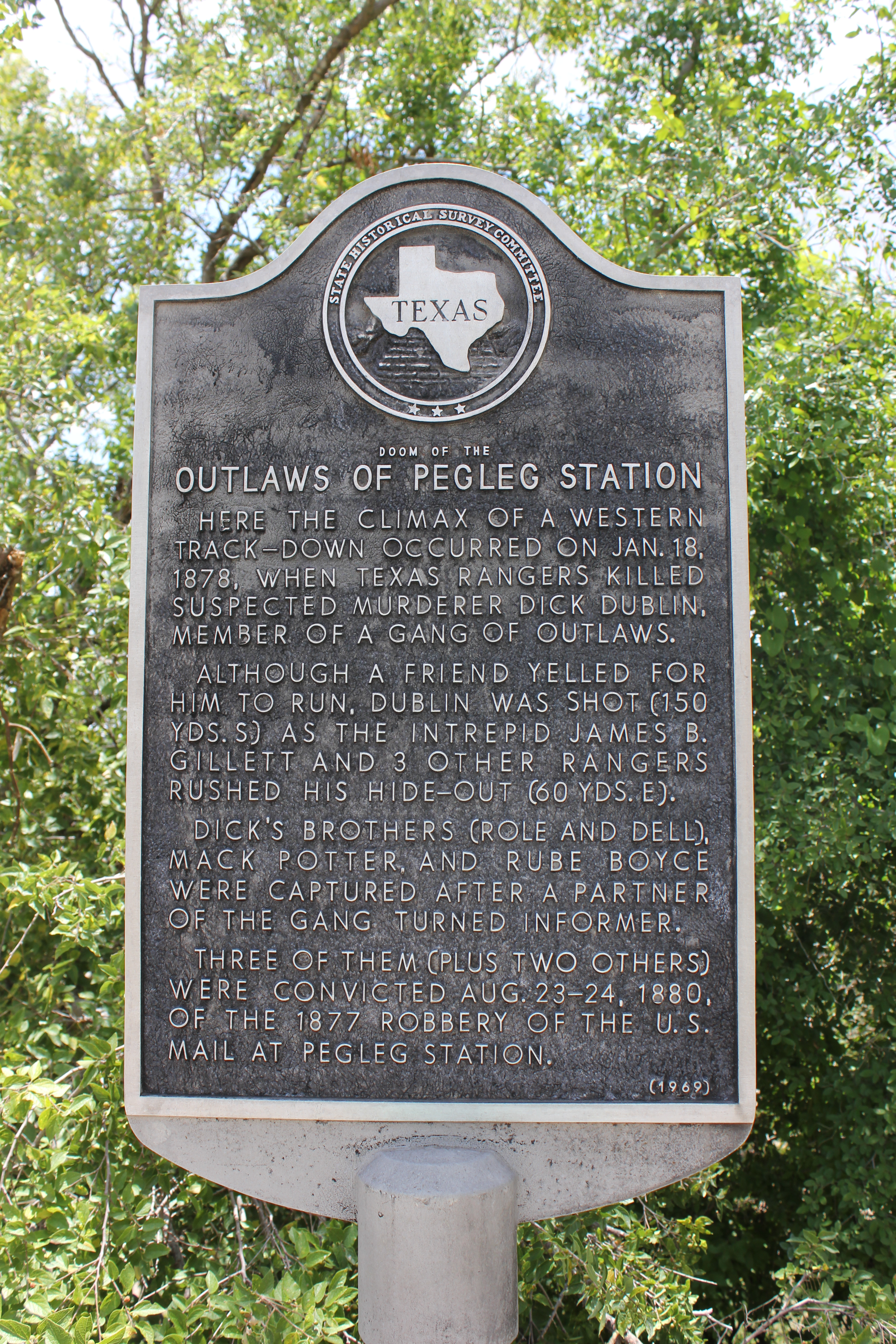
Doom of the OUTLAWS OF PEGLEG STATION, Kimble County, Texas Historical Marker

Mail robbery is the robbery of mail usually when it is in the possession, custody, or control, of the delivering authority, which in most countries is the postal operator and can involve the theft of money or luxury goods.

== History ==
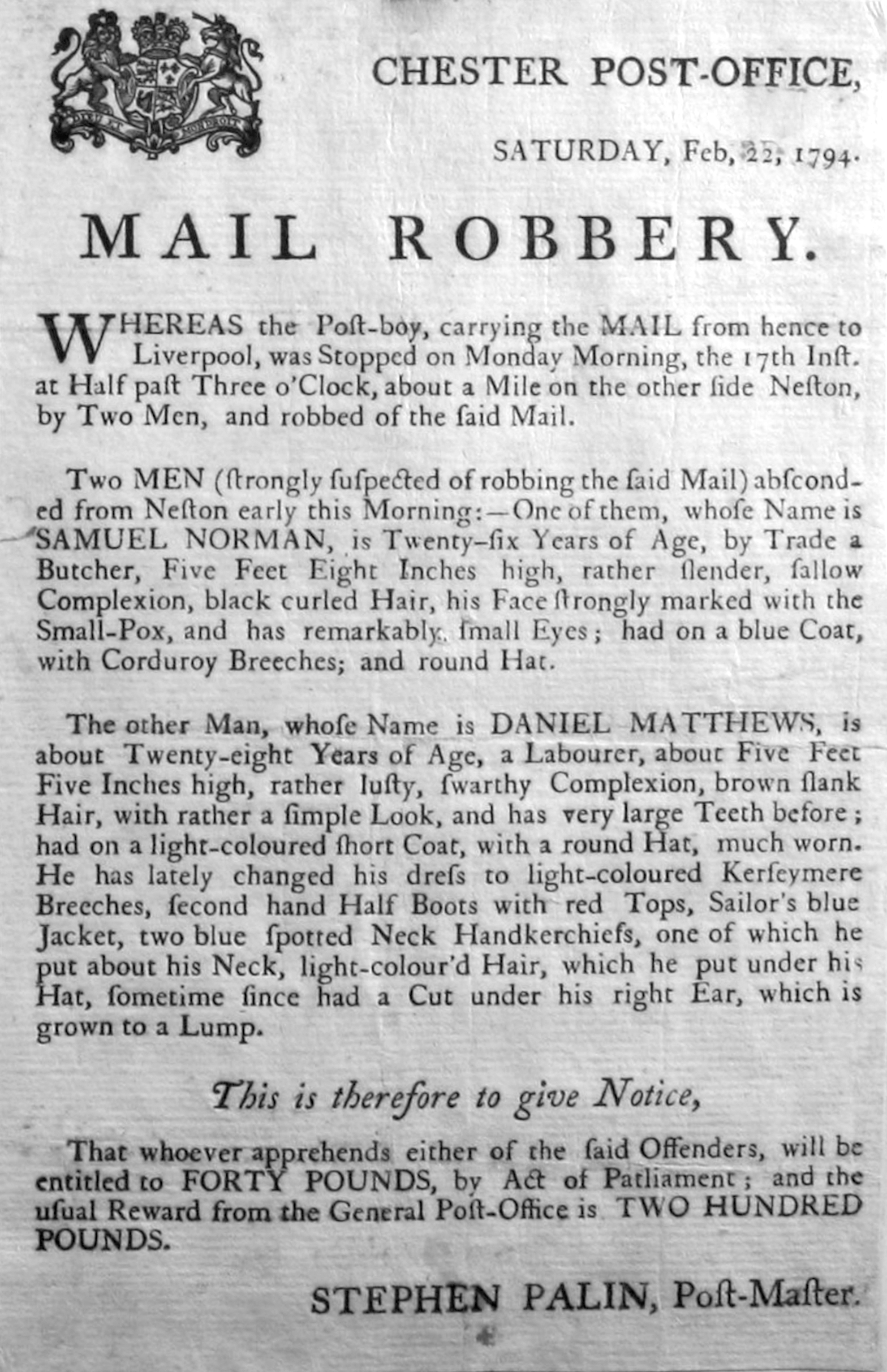
1794 post office notice of reward concerning the robbery of the mail between Chester and Liverpool

In the UK stage coach (from 1784 Mail coach) robberies by highwaymen were common, despite the death penalty. For example, in 1722 two were executed for robbing the Bristol mail.

Robberies from trains also began early. An early example was on the Bristol and Exeter Railway in 1849.

In the USA, the period immediately following the First World War witnessed a large number of mail robberies. Eventually, the frequency of these thefts caused the Department of the Navy to place armed Marines on all mail trains.

A number of high-value mail robberies occurred in the UK after the Second World War, as a result of a lack of improvements in security in the transport of money. One major example was the Eastcastle Street robbery in 1952, involving the theft of £287,000 from a post office van in London. Overall that year, 629 mailbags went missing, and in the following year the figure was 738.

The two most significant mail robberies both occurred in the early 1960s. In the UK, £2.6 million was taken in the 'Great Train Robbery' of 1963. A year earlier, $1.5 million was stolen from the hold-up of a U.S. Mail truck in Massachusetts. By the end of the 1960s, however, mail robbery had become less common.

== See also ==
- Package pilferage
- Alvin Karpis
- Charles Bolles alias Black Bart
- Dave Rudabaugh
- Mail fraud
- Postal robbery in the Subach
- Plymouth Mail robbery
- Roadblock (1951 film)
- Ronnie Biggs
- Roy Gardner (bank robber)
- Sallins Train Robbery
- Stagecoach
- Thomas James Holden
- United States Postal Inspection Service
- William Quantrill
- Wyatt Earp
