= Lord Arthur Somerset =

British Noble

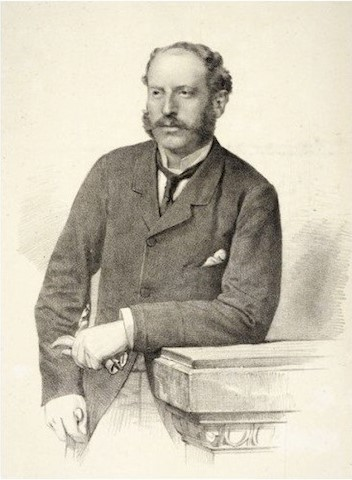
- Lord Arthur Somerset
- Born: 17 November 1851
- Died: 26 May 1926 (aged 74); Hyères, France
- Noble family: Beaufort
- Father: Henry Somerset, 8th Duke of Beaufort
- Mother: Georgiana Charlotte Curzon

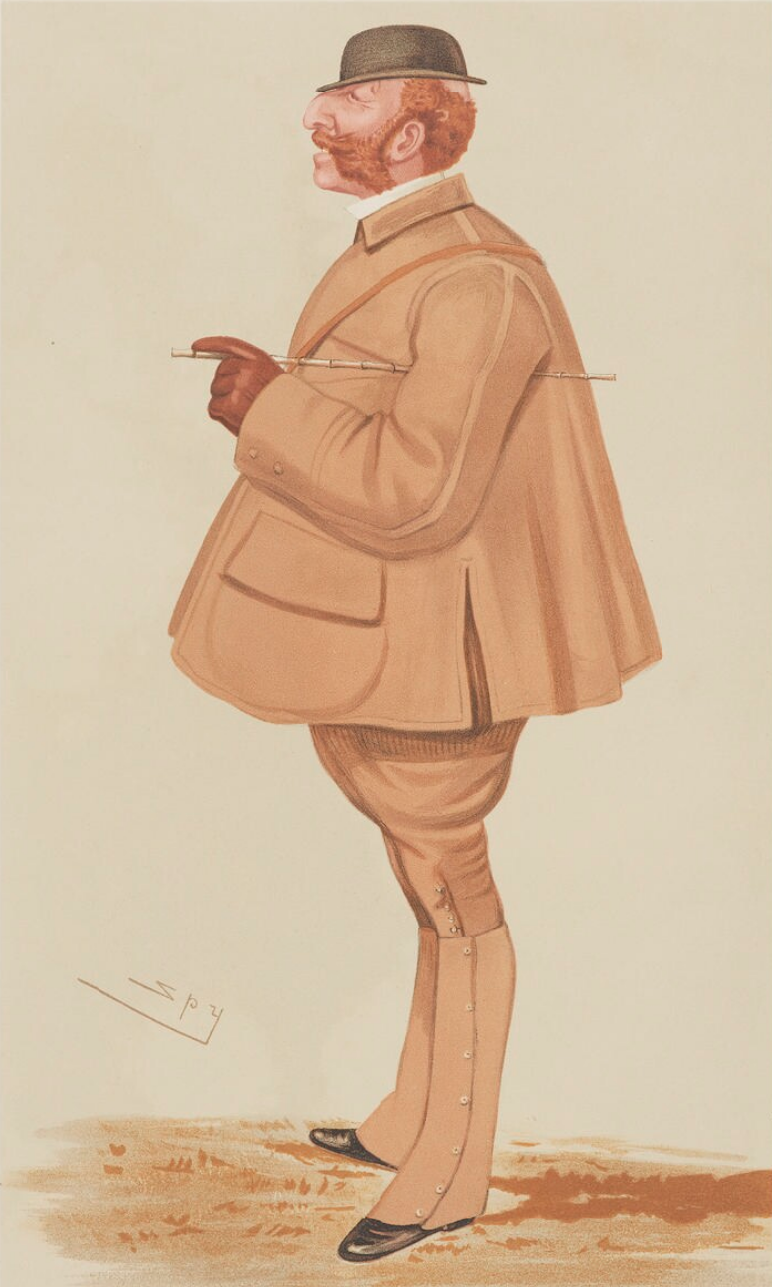
An 1887 caricature of Lord Arthur Somerset

Major Lord Henry Arthur George Somerset, DL (17 November 1851 – 26 May 1926) was the third son of the 8th Duke of Beaufort and his wife, the former Lady Georgiana Curzon.

== Biography ==
Somerset joined the Royal Horse Guards with the purchase of a commission as cornet in 1869. He was promoted to lieutenant in 1871, captain in 1877 and major in 1883. In 1885 he was appointed to succeed Nigel Kingscote as superintendent of the stables and an extra equerry-in-waiting to the Prince of Wales (later King Edward VII).

Lord Arthur Somerset was linked with the Cleveland Street scandal, in which he was identified and named by several male prostitutes as a customer of their services. He was interviewed by the police on 7 August 1889, and although the record of the interview has not survived, it resulted in a report being made by the Attorney-General, Solicitor-General and Director of Prosecutions urging that proceedings should be taken against him under section 11 of the Criminal Law Amendment Act 1885. A piece of paper was pasted over Somerset's name in the report, as it was deemed so sensitive. It is believed that he gave the police the initials of a member of the royal family "P. A. V.", which stood for Prince Albert Victor, the second in line to the throne, who – he alleged – also frequented the brothel.

After that, the Director was told that the Home Secretary wished him to take no action for the moment. The police obtained a further statement implicating Somerset, while Somerset arranged for his solicitor to act in the defence of the boys arrested over the scandal. After the police saw him for a second time on 22 August, Somerset obtained leave from his regiment and permission to go abroad.

Lord Arthur went to Bad Homburg in Germany, although he returned to England. When tipped off in September that charges were imminent, he fled to France to avoid them. In November he resigned his Army commission and his appointments in the Prince of Wales's household. From there he travelled through Constantinople, Budapest, Vienna, and back to France, where he settled, living with an Englishman, James Neale, until his death in 1926, aged 74.
