= Teleny, or The Reverse of the Medal =

1893 British erotic novel

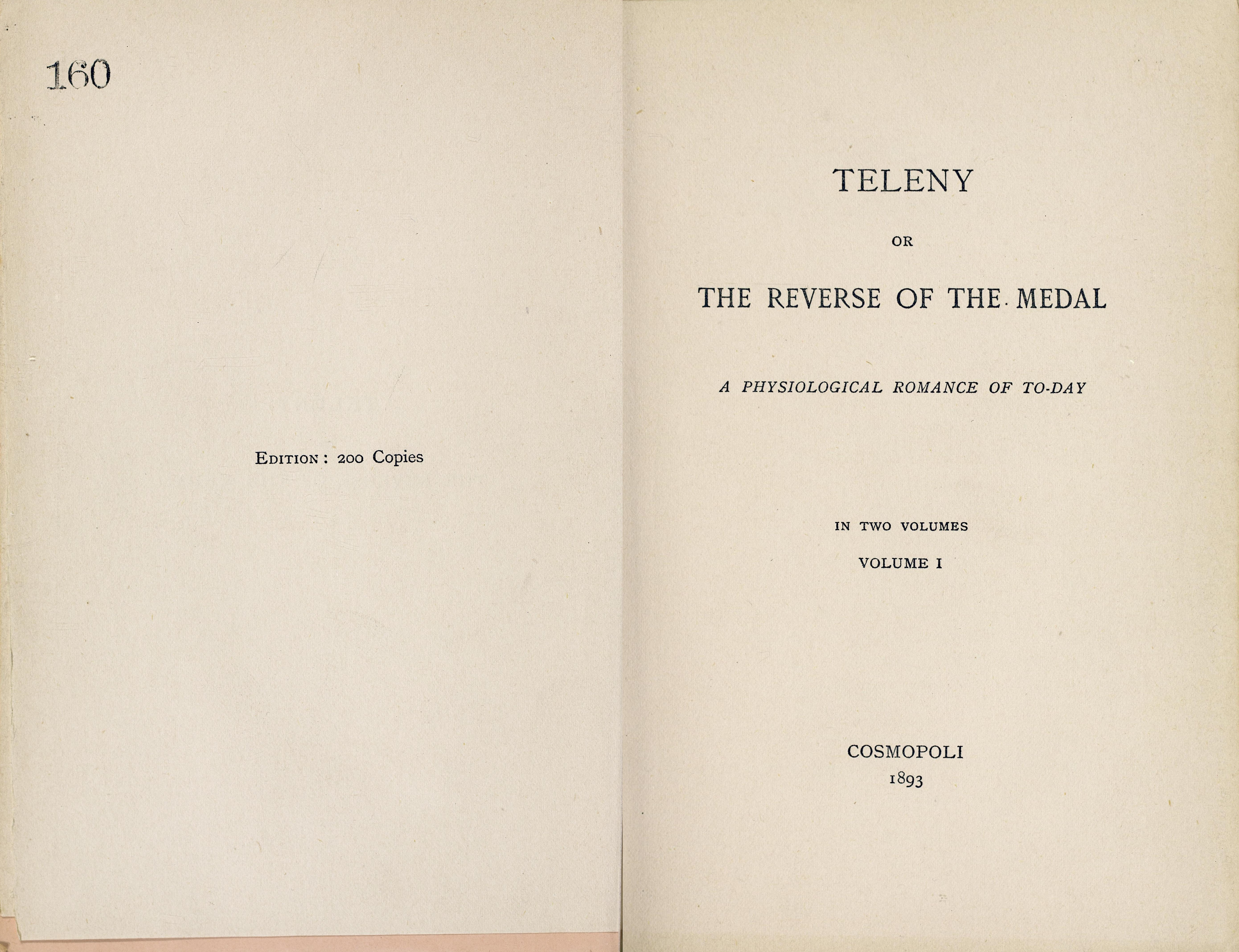
- Author: Anonymous; attributed to Oscar Wilde
- Language: English
- Series: Erotika Biblion Society
- Genre: Novel; Pornography
- Publisher: Leonard Smithers
- Publication date: 1893
- Publication place: United Kingdom
- Text: Teleny, or The Reverse of the Medal at Wikisource

Teleny, or The Reverse of the Medal is a pornographic novel, first published in London in 1893. The authorship of the work is unknown. There is a consensus that it was an ensemble effort, but it has often been attributed to Oscar Wilde. Set in fin de siècle Paris, its concerns are the magnetic attraction and passionate though ultimately tragic affair between a young Frenchman named Camille Des Grieux and the Hungarian pianist René Teleny. The novel is one of the earliest pieces of English-language pornography that focuses explicitly and near-exclusively on homosexuality (following The Sins of the Cities of the Plain, published in 1881). Its lush and literate, though variable, prose style and the relative complexity and depth of character and plot development share as much with the aesthetic fiction of the period as with its typical pornography.

== History of publication ==
Wilde's authorship, while unproven, is claimed by erotic bookseller and pornographer Charles Hirsch, "A few days later one of the young gentlemen I had seen with [Wilde] came to collect the package. He kept it for a while and then brought it back saying in turn: 'Would you kindly give this to one of our friends who will come to fetch it in the same person’s name'". Hirsch recounts three further repetitions of this "identical ceremony" before the package made its way back to Wilde. Hirsch defied the strict instructions not to open the package while it was in his care, and claims that it was written in several different hands, which lends further support to his supposition that it was authored in "round robin" style by a small group of Wilde's intimate associates. Neither Wilde's authorship nor editorship has ever been ascertained.

By 1893, the manuscript had made its way into the hands of Leonard Smithers, who since 1892 had been in business with Harry Sidney Nichols, Smithers serving primarily as an "entrepreneurial" liaison between "authors, publishers, and distributors". Smithers and Nichols were aligned with William Lazenby, Edward Avery, and Charles Carrington, in a small and tightly interwoven group of late Victorian publishers heavily involved in the production and distribution of pornography in London and Paris. Smithers worked extensively in the 1890s with Wilde and his circle, as is indicated by the title of James Nelson's book on Smithers, Publisher to the Decadents. Lisa Sigel claims that unlike most pornographers, who were eager to preserve their anonymity for reasons of respectability and safety, Smithers "embrace[d] public scrutiny" and managed to earn some renown for encouraging and orchestrating the collaboration of Wilde and Beardsley on Salome. (Note: Smithers's reputation was tainted, however, after Wilde's imprisonment, and in financial desperation he resorted to pirating copies of Wilde's works.) From 1892 to 1894 Smithers and Nichols released, among other projects, a series of pornographic novels under the imprint Erotika Biblion Society. Teleny was published 1893 as part of this series in a limited edition of 200 copies, with significant edits by Smithers, including the omission of an introduction and a change in the setting from London to Paris. Smithers promoted it in an advertisement, sent to a select group of subscribers, as "undoubtedly, the most powerful and most cleverly written erotic Romance which has appeared in the English language during recent years," authored by "a man of great imagination…[who] has conceived a thrilling story." And: "It is a most extraordinary story of passion, and while dealing with scenes which surpass in freedom the wildest license, the culture of its author’s style adds an additional piquancy and spice to the narration". Judged by the traditional literary standards of plot, character, suspense, variation, style, etc. which usually find pornography lacking, (Note: Steven Marcus does this in The Other Victorians.) Teleny stands apart from its contemporaries as the "most powerful and most cleverly written erotic Romance."

Hirsch published a translation into French in Paris in 1934 shifting the locale back to London.

In 1958 it was published in English by Paris-based Olympia Press. A paperback edition from Icon Books came out in 1966. This was an expurgated version due to the laws regarding obscene publication in effect at the time. In the introduction to that edition, readers are advised that if they wish to see the complete text they can in the British Museum, where a copy is kept in the Private Case. In 1986, it was published in London by Gay Men's Press as part of their Gay Modern Classics series; Wordsworth Classics published it in 1995 in their series Wordsworth Classic Erotica. The most recent edition, edited by Amanda Mordavsky Caleb, was published by Valancourt Books in 2010.

== Plot summary ==
The story begins with Des Grieux attending a concert with his mother; he experiences strange and suggestive visions during one piano performance – by the beautiful Hungarian Teleny. Des Grieux becomes fascinated by the man and by the sporadically and frequently sexual telepathic connection he feels with Teleny, and this feeling becomes a mixture of curiosity, admiration, and desire, which quickly leads to jealousy. Des Grieux knows that Teleny attracts many men and women before their relationship begins. Eventually they meet and share their experiences of their unexplained bond which quickly leads to a passionate affair. Des Grieux feels very torn about loving and desiring a man and attempts to genuinely sexually interest himself in a household servant, but in so doing indirectly leads to her death. Thus shaken, he vows not to fight his feelings and allows Teleny to introduce him to an underground sexual society of males desiring men. Their love continues through a blackmailing attempt and their emotional struggles, until Teleny declares a need to leave for a time, ostensibly for a concert performance. During this time Des Grieux goes to Teleny's apartments only to find Teleny in bed with Des Grieux's mother, who had offered to pay Teleny's debts in return for sexual favours. The two part badly; Des Grieux nearly commits suicide and remains isolated in the hospital for many days. When he leaves he goes to Teleny only to find that his lover has stabbed himself in remorse, and is bleeding to death. Des Grieux forgives Teleny; they re-declare their love, and Teleny dies.

== Adaptations ==
A comic book adaptation by Jon Macy entitled Teleny and Camille, published by Northwest Press in 2010, won the 2010 Lambda Literary Award for Gay Erotica. In May 2014, Melbourne's Fly-On-The-Wall Theatre presented a stage production of Teleny adapted by playwright Barry Lowe, directed by Robert Chuter.
