= Erotika Biblion Society =

Pornographic publishing imprint in Victorian London

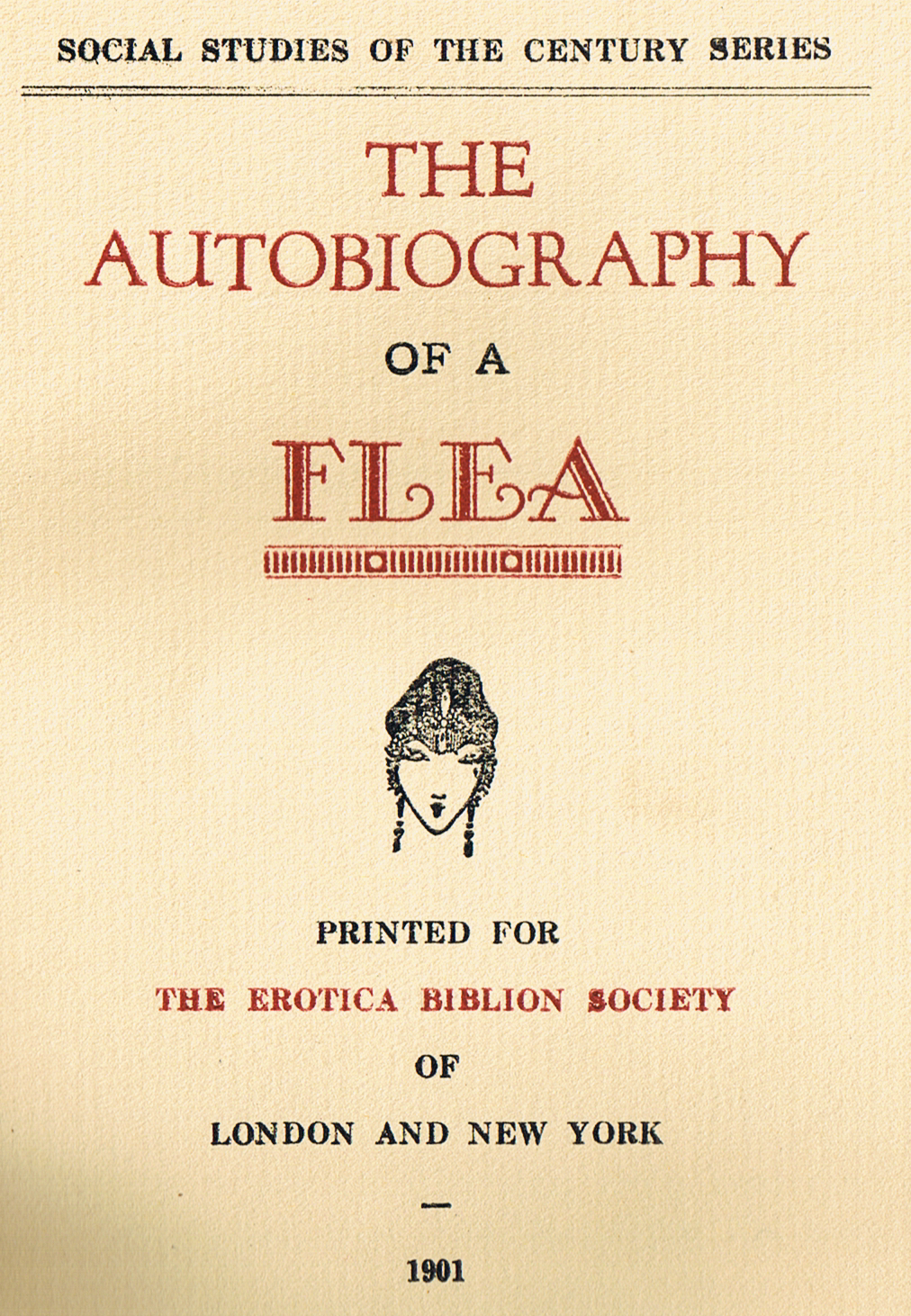
The Autobiography of a Flea, Edward Avery, cover of 1901.

The Erotika Biblion Society was a pornographic publishing imprint in Sheffield formed by Harry Sidney Nichols and Leonard Smithers around 1886, with their first publication appearing in 1888. In 1891 both moved to London.

They formed their name from the nonfiction treatise of the same name, Erotika Biblion (1783), published in Paris before the French Revolution, under the penmanship of the Comte de Mirabeau. One of their most notable publications was Teleny, or The Reverse of the Medal, an anonymous product of several authors in which it is speculated that Oscar Wilde collaborated.

The venture ended in 1907, after the death of Smithers.

== Publications ==
- VOISENON, [Claude-Henri de Fusée] Abbé de. Fairy Tales. Translated by R. B. Douglas. Illustrated With and Etched Frontispiece by Will Rothenstein. Athens [London] 1895.
- Full Bibliography listed in: Steven Halliwell, The Erotika Biblion Society (The Rivendale Press, 2025).

== See also ==
- List of pornographic book publishers
