= The Sins of the Cities of the Plain =

1881 novel

- Author: Anonymous
- Language: English
- Genre: Gay erotica
- Publisher: William Lazenby
- Publication date: 1881
- Publication place: United Kingdom
- Media type: Print
- Text: The Sins of the Cities of the Plain at Wikisource

The Sins of the Cities of the Plain; or, The Recollections of a Mary-Ann, with Short Essays on Sodomy and Tribadism, by the pseudonymous "Jack Saul", is one of the first exclusively homosexual works of pornographic literature published in English. The book was first published in 1881 by William Lazenby, who printed 250 copies. A second edition was published by Leonard Smithers in 1902. It sold for an expensive four guineas.

== Overview ==
The Sins of the Cities of the Plain purports to be the memoirs of Jack Saul, a young rentboy or "Mary-Ann". In the book Saul is picked up on the street by a Mr. Chambon. After they have dinner, Chambon invites Saul to recount his life story.

While some have accepted it as a genuine account, it is more likely to be an early form of the non-fiction novel.

John Saul was an actual male prostitute of Irish birth, known as 'Dublin Jack', who was involved in a homosexual scandal at Dublin Castle in 1884, and later in the Cleveland Street scandal. The book is clearly inspired by him, and it is possible he shared his experiences with the anonymous author(s). Factual details suggest the book could be based on an authentic rentboy's account, but one that has been elaborated. There are consistencies with the real life Saul, but also discrepancies: he was of Irish birth, but in the book he is English.

The 'Mr Chambon' in the book lives "in the Cornwall Mansions close to Baker Street Station". William Simpson Potter, a friend of William Lazenby the publisher, did live at Cornwall Residences, a now-demolished block of nondescript Victorian flats near the Station, from about 1877 until his death in 1889. Potter was the 'compiler' of another anonymous piece of the erotica A Letter from the East (1877) as well as Letters from India during HRH the Prince of Wales' Visit in 1875/6 (1876). Mr Chambon could be based on Potter, who was also a friend of Henry Spencer Ashbee, and may have known Saul.

Ashbee, who included the title in his classic bibliography of erotic literature, suggested that the characters Boulton and Park may have been known to the author(s) in real life. Boulton and Park were an actual duo of Victorian transvestites who appeared as defendants in a celebrated court case of 1871. In The Sins of the Cities of the Plain, Jack Saul in the guise of "Miss Eveline" recounts how he meets Boulton ("Miss Laura") and Park dressed up as women at Haxell's Hotel in the Strand with Boulton's lover and "husband" Lord Arthur Clinton trailing along behind. Jack Saul later spends the night at Boulton and Park's rooms in Eaton Square and the next day has breakfast with them "all dressed as ladies".

Pornographic bookseller Charles Hirsch claimed that this was one of the "Socratic" books that he purveyed to Oscar Wilde in 1890.

In 1883, Hirsh published a sequel "Letters from Laura and Eveline, Giving an Account of Their Mock-Marriage, Wedding Trip, etc. Published as an Appendix to Sins of the Cities." It was reprinted in 1899 and 1903. Only one original copy is known to survive: that of the third edition.

The only known copy of the original edition of Sins of the Cities of the Plain is held by the British Library. Both books have been republished by Valancourt Books.

== Authorship ==
It has been suggested that it was largely written by the pornographer James Campbell Reddie. Reddie died several years before its publication, and was ill with poor eyesight prior to that, which makes his connection unlikely. Authorship has also been attributed to the painter Simeon Solomon, who had been convicted of public indecency in 1873 and disgraced. However, this attribution is based on speculation and the "circumstantial evidence" of Solomon's friendship with Boulton and Park.

== List of chapters ==
Volume 1
"Recollections of a Mary-Ann: Introduction"
"Jack Saul's Recollections: Early Development of the Pederastic Ideas in His Youthful Mind"

Volume 2
"Jack Saul's Recollections (continued): Some Frolics with Boulton and Park"
"Further Recollections and Incidents"
"The Same Old Story: Arses Preferred to Cunts"
"A Short Essay on Sodomy, etc."
"Tribadism"

== Editions ==
- The Sins of the Cities of the Plain; or, The Recollections of a Mary-Ann, with Short Essays on Sodomy and Tribadism. 2 volumes. London: privately printed, 1881.
- The Sins of the Cities of the Plain; or, The Recollections of a Mary-Ann, with Short Essays on Sodomy and Tribadism. London and New York: Erotica Biblion Society, 1902.
- Sins of the Cities of the Plain, ed. James Jennings. Badboy Books. New York: Masquerade Books, 1992. ISBN 1-56333-322-8
  - The 1992 edition not only switches the sex of almost all characters but also adds and omits entire scenes, as noted by Morris B. Kaplan.
- Die Sünde von Sodom. Erinnerungen eines viktorianischen Strichers, edited and translated by Wolfram Setz. Bibliothek rosa Winkel, 12. Berlin: Verlag rosa Winkel, 1995; Hamburg: MännerschwarmSkript, 2005. ISBN 3861490420
- Jack Saul, Sins of the Cities of the Plain. New Traveller's Companion Series, 91. Olympia Press, 2006. ISBN 1-59654-286-1
- The Sins of the Cities of the Plain, edited by Wolfram Setz. Kansas City: Valancourt Books, 2013. ISBN 978-1-934555-31-6
- Los pecados de las ciudades de la llanura. Madrid: Editorial Amistades Particulares, 2015. ISBN 978-84-943115-5-0

== Adaptation ==
In 2019, the opera The Sins of the Cities of the Plain premiered at Espacio Turina in Seville, Spain. The libretto was entirely written in Polari by librettist and playwright Fabrizio Funari, while the music was composed by Germán Alonso, with cantaor Niño de Elche in the role of Jack Saul. The opera was produced and performed by instrumental ensemble Proyecto OCNOS, formed by Pedro Rojas-Ogáyar and Gustavo A. Domínguez Ojalvo, with the support of ICAS Sevilla, Fundación BBVA and The Librettist.
