= Will G. Mein =

British artist

- Born: William Gordon Mein; April 4, 1868; Kelso, Scotland
- Died: 1939 (aged 70–71); London
- Occupation: Illustrator
- Spouse: Frances Elizabeth Sinclair

William Gordon Mein (4 April 1868 - 1939) was a British book illustrator who flourished in the late 19th to early 20th century. He lived in London from around the turn of the century.

== Life and works ==
Mein was born in Kelso, Roxburgh, Scotland. His painting On the Tweed Near Berwick was exhibited by the Royal Scottish Academy in 1898 but he is known primarily for his illustrations. His drawings were published in The Dome periodical, with contemporary artists Laurence Housman and Frank Mura. He was engaged by publisher Andrew Melrose to illustrate W. E. Cule's fairy tale Mabel's Prince Wonderful (1899) - his first major book illustration commission. Around the same time, the Decadent publisher Leonard Smithers commissioned him to illustrate Nigel Tourneur's Hidden Witchery.

Mein married Frances Elizabeth Sinclair in December 1902, in Berwick, and they settled in Fulham, London. In the 1911 Census he was living at 18 Rostrevor Mans Rd. Fulham and his occupation is listed as artist and Art Chronicle editor. He is known in particular for illustrating works of fairy tale and fantasy and also specialised in boys' stories. He provided woodcut illustrations for The Roadmender by Michael Fairless (1903), which went through many editions.

He died in London in 1939.

== Selected works illustrated by Mein ==
- Michael Fairless (Margaret Barber) The Roadmender, Duckworth & Company, London, 1903.
- D.L A. Jephson, A Fragment, R. J. Everett & Sons, London, 1903.
- Cyril Arthur Edward Ranger Gull (pseud. Guy Thorne) From the Book Beautiful: Being Some Old Lights Relit, Greening & Co., London,1903.
- The Adventures of Ulysses the Wanderer: An Old Story Retold, Greening & Co., London, 1902.
- Nigel Tourneur, Hidden Witchery, Leonard Smithers, London, 1898.
- Percy Izzard, Homeland:A Year of Country Days, .John Richmond, London, 1918.
- Irene Osgood (trans.) The Indelicate Duellist: Adapted from the French (of Charles Leroy), John Richmond, London, 1914.
- Where Pharaoh Dreams: Being the Impressions of a Woman-of-Moods in Egypt", John Richmond, London, 1914.
- W. E. Cule. Mabel's Prince Wonderful: or, A Trip to Storyland, E. W. & R. Chambers, Edinburgh & London,1899.
- Christies Deas. Pan-o’-the-Pipes: Eight Fairy Tales, A. Walker & Son, Galashiels, 1915.
- Clement Scott. Some Notable Hamlets of the Present Time, Greening & Co., London, 1900.
- H.L.Havell, Stories from Thucydides, Harrap, 1909
- James Eaton. The Worship of It, and Other Fancies, Grant Richards, London. 1915.
- James Baldwin,The Story of Roland and the Peers of Charlemagne, George G. Harrap & Co., 1917
- Regina Miriam Bloch, The Book of Strange Loves, London, 1918
