= Male prostitution =

Men providing sexual services for payment

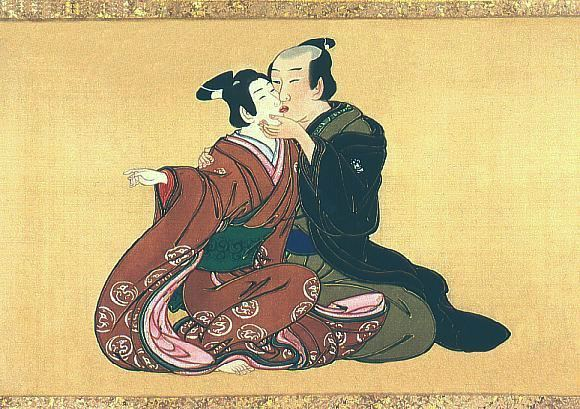
- Miyagawa Isshō, Samurai kisses male actor, ca. 1750

Occupation
- Names: Male escort, call boy
- Occupation type: Prostitute, sex worker
- Activity sectors: Sex industry

Description
- Fields of employment: Sex work
- Related jobs: Stripper, porn actor, sugar dating

Male prostitution is a form of sex work consisting of the act or practice of men providing sexual services in return for payment. Although clients can be of any gender, the vast majority are older males looking to fulfill their sexual desires. Male prostitutes have been far less studied than female prostitutes by researchers. Even so, male prostitution has an extensive history, including regulation through homosexuality, conceptual developments on sexuality, and the HIV/AIDS epidemic impact. In the last century, male sex work has seen various advancements such as popularizing new sexual acts, methods of exchange, and carving out a spot in cinema.

== Terminology ==
The terms used for male prostitutes generally differ from those used for females. Some terms vary by clientele or method of business. Where prostitution is illegal or taboo, it is common for male prostitutes to use euphemisms which present their business as providing companionship, nude modeling or dancing, body massage, or some other acceptable fee-for-service arrangement. Thus one may be referred to as a male escort, gigolo (implying female customers), rent boy, hustler (more common for those soliciting in public places), model, or masseur. A man who does not regard himself as gay or bisexual, but who has sex with male clients for money, is sometimes called gay-for-pay, or trade. A more dated term for a man who dressed similarly to female sex workers and tried to pass as a woman is known as a fairy.

Male clients, especially those who pick up prostitutes on the street or in bars, are sometimes called johns or tricks. Those working in prostitution, especially street prostitutes, sometimes refer to the act of prostitution as turning tricks.

Michel Dorais describes four types of working patterns that male prostitutes usually fall into in his book, Rent Boys: the World of Male Sex Trade Workers.

1. Outcasts: This group is severely impoverished and living day to day. They face substance abuse issues and most of their money goes towards alcohol and drugs (including cocaine and heroin). They frequently use drugs some time before, after, or during their sexual encounters. Compared to the others groups, outcasts included the highest number of sexual abuse victims. Male sex workers in this group are usually the youngest in the trade, with an average age of eighteen. Criminal activity, violence, and addiction are all characteristics of "outcasts".
2. Part-timers: Members of this group do not participate in sex work on a daily basis. They use sex work as a way to make life somewhat more comfortable, for example, if they needed to pay a bill or afford something they would not normally be able to. Drug and alcohol usage is uncharacteristic of the "part-timers". Their average age is twenty-eight years old.
3. Insiders: As the name implies, "insiders" grew up around the sex trade and view those surrounding them as their "family". Unlike the part-timers and the outcasts, the insiders view prostitution as an honorable occupation. Some try other jobs and turn back to prostitution because they miss the work. Most males use drugs to various extents in this category. The average age of an "insider" is seventeen.
4. Liberationists: A group who primarily identifies as homosexual for which prostitution is a source of exploration and realizing their fantasies. Liberationists have higher levels of education and self-esteem and maintain good connections with their families. They believe that prostitution fulfills their sexual and emotional needs, so relationships are casual.

== Introduction to prostitution ==
Surveys show that male sex workers often report getting into prostitution after running away from home, due to unfortunate home situations. While the trade is not forced upon most, many participants turn to sex work out of desperation. After running away to major cities with no money, some resort to prostitution to take care of themselves. However, extreme poverty is not the only reason why men and boys partake in prostitution. Bridge Over Troubled Waters Inc, a Boston agency that works with children in crisis, surveyed young male prostitutes and 86% of them reported having to serve someone's sexual needs prior to joining in sex work. Many are sexualized and/or victimized as children, but there is little data that confirms a direct link to prostitution. Nonetheless, some do believe that sex, whether casual or transactional, is a way to acquire affection and attention, which can influence their sexual activity. Often, they have no prior experiences with prostitution and do not approach potential clients, but they allow the punters to approach them. Male prostitutes generally do not have pimps, but if they do, it is usually because they have not learned how to find their own clients and take care of themselves yet.

If parents were to know about their child's participation in sex work, they usually have one of two responses. If their clients are older men, and the relationship is going, some parents take that as an exploitative relationship. In this case, they may report this observation. Other parents may condone the practice. If the household is struggling, they will let their son continue engaging in sex work because they need the additional income, and "working class boys" are expected to contribute to bills.

== History ==
=== Ancient ===
Male prostitution has been part of nearly all cultures, ancient and modern. The practice in the ancient world of men or women selling sexual services in sacred shrines, or sacred prostitution, was attested to be practiced by foreign or pagan cultures in the Hebrew Bible or Old Testament. Male prostitutes are also attested to in Graeco-Roman culture in the New Testament, among many other ancient sources. Some interpreters consider that in one of the Pauline vice lists, 1 Corinthians 6:9–10, one of the words malakoi ("soft") or arsenokoitai (a compound of "male" and "bed") refer to male prostitution (or male temple prostitution): this interpretation of arsenokoitai is followed in the New Revised Standard Version.

The Encyclopedia of Homosexuality states that prostitutes in ancient Greece were generally slaves. A well-known case is Phaedo of Elis who was captured in war and forced into slavery and prostitution but was eventually ransomed to become a pupil of Socrates; Plato's Phaedo is told from his perspective. Male brothels existed in both ancient Greece and ancient Rome.

=== Modern ===
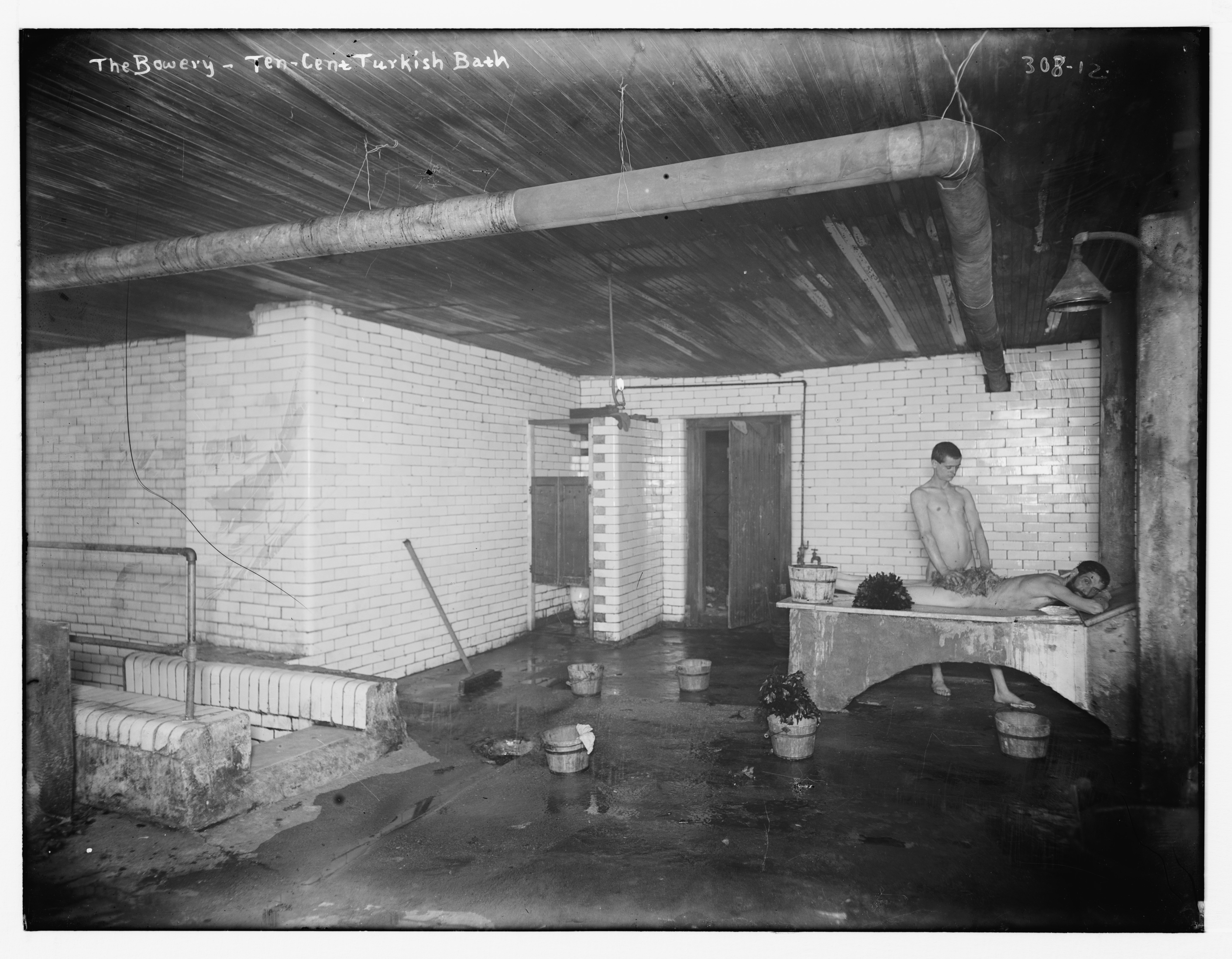
A nude male prostitute giving a man a massage in the Bowery district in New York, c. 1910

Young male prostitutes in the Edo period of Japan were called kagema. Their clients were mainly adult men. In southern areas of Central Asia and Afghanistan, adolescent males between twelve and sixteen years old perform erotic songs and suggestive dancing and are available as sex workers. Such boys are known as bacchá.

The most famous male prostitute of the Victorian era was the Irish-born John Saul, who was involved in both the 1884 Dublin Castle scandal, and the Cleveland Street scandal of 1889.

A male sex worker in the Caribbean who solicits on the beaches and accepts clients of either sex is called a sanky-panky. Cuban male prostitutes are called jinetero – literally "horse jockey"; female prostitutes are called jinetera.

==== United States ====
Court records and vice investigations from as early as the 17th century document male prostitution in what is now the United States. With the expansion of urban areas and the aggregation of gay people into communities toward the end of the 19th century, male/male prostitution became more apparent. Around this time, prostitution was reported to have taken place in brothels, such as the Paresis Hall in the Bowery district of New York and in some gay bathhouses. Solicitation for sex, including paid sex, took place in certain bars between so-called "fairies".

Male street prostitutes solicited clients in specific areas which became known for the trade. Well-known areas for street "hustlers" have included: parts of 53rd Street in New York City; Santa Monica Boulevard in Los Angeles; Cypress Street in Atlanta; Piccadilly Circus in London; "The Wall" in Sydney's Darlinghurst; The Drug Store and Rue Sainte-Anne in Paris; Polk Street Gulch in San Francisco; and Taksim Square in Istanbul. Bars such as Cowboys and Cowgirls and Rounds in New York City, Numbers in Los Angeles, and certain go-go bars in Patpong, Thailand were popular venues where male prostitutes offered their services.

The 1969 Stonewall riots were a turning point for male sex workers and the LGBTQ+ community. As a result of the uprising, and the formation of the gay liberation movement, there was increased openness in the community along with more opportunities for sex workers. Gay publications and activist groups were created. Sex workers were now able to publish print advertisements that could be read in these newsletters that were distributed in the bars and bookstores, as well as sent through the mail. Telephone chat lines became another, potentially safer line of doing business than street hustling. Through phone sex the clients were able to control their fantasy and have some security in the fact that they were communicating anonymously. The emergence of hustler bars provided sex workers with a reliable and consistent supply of clients and created a more social atmosphere for them. The bars took some of the streetwalkers off the streets, providing them some protection. In exchange for being allowed to work in the hustler bars, sex workers would have to sacrifice a fraction of their incomes. The gay liberation era normalized gay men buying sex from other gay men. Before then, most gay and bisexual men hid their sexuality because gay sex was still illegal in most places as well as socially condemned; they feared arrest, exposure, ostracism or harsher punishment. Some male clients would also express a preference for "heterosexual" sex workers, saying they wanted to be dominated by men they perceived as straight. Formerly more taboo sexual practices such as homosexual threesomes, anal penetration, and roleplay began to be discussed more openly. Along with the rise in gay liberation and the sexual openness of the 1970s, gay prostitution became more openly discussed and less taboo, even though policing and discrimination kept many people closeted.

A table in Larry Townsend's The Leatherman's Handbook II (the 1983 second edition; the 1972 first edition did not include this list) which is generally considered authoritative states that a green handkerchief is a symbol for prostitution in the handkerchief code, which is employed usually among gay male casual-sex seekers or BDSM practitioners in the United States, Canada, Australia and Europe. Wearing the handkerchief on the left indicates the top, dominant, or active partner; on the right indicates the bottom, submissive, or passive partner. However, negotiation with a prospective partner remains important because, as Townsend noted, people may wear hankies of any color "only because the idea of the hankie turns them on" or "may not even know what it means".

== Clients of male sex workers ==
Sex work clients are people who pay for sexual services. Before the mid-20th century, clients were invisible and shielded from public discourse. Sex workers face the double standard of people being critical of them for supplying sex, but not the clients for demanding/buying sex.

=== Characteristics of clients ===
Common reasons for resorting to buying sex include fear of not being able to find other partners without paying them, attraction to adolescents, or having unsatisfying sex lives. Overall, the rent boy would fill the sexual or emotional void that the client could be experiencing.

Donald West explains three different scenarios in which clients may pay for a prostitute:

1. They are married men with unsatisfying or non-existent sex lives. They may be homosexual or purely unhappy in their current situation, so they resort to commercial sex.
2. They are men who have healthy (heterosexual) marriages and homosexual experiences on the side, appearing to be bisexual.
3. They are non-married men who are closeted and scared of being found out, or men who are openly gay and looking for more opportunities for sex.

Clients tend to request anal sex, but the most common services requested are mutual masturbation and oral sex.

=== Friendship and support ===
In some instances, friendships can be made between the client and sex worker, to the exclusion of all sexual activity. Renters might finance the sex worker's education, find them new clients or other jobs, or provide them with food, shelter, or clothing. As a result, sex workers often praise their clients, and both the seller and buyer have their respective wants and needs satisfied.

== Regulation ==
Initially, male prostitution was ignored and not subjected to any of the policing and examinations women faced. Even though law enforcement might have suspected there were male sex workers, they would disregard it. Eventually when male prostitution started being regulated, men and boys would be arrested less frequently and receive lesser sentences and fines than women. As time progressed, the target of regulation became homosexuality.

=== In the British Empire ===
In the 18th and 19th centuries, the United Kingdom indirectly regulated male sex work. By making homosexuality illegal, the U.K. caused male sex workers to become more discreet with their services to avoid being fined or jailed. Acts of indecency, whether in public or private, along with sodomy and homosexual solicitation, were a few regulatory practices put into place at that time. As the British Empire grew, the criminalization of homosexuality spread around the world. Subsequently, male prostitutes moved into more urban or commercialized spaces to blend in with their surroundings and not draw attention to themselves. Such laws were in place in England and Australia until the mid-1960s.

Research challenged the idea that homosexuality was an act of deviance and caused a divide in the UK. For that reason, Sir John Wolfenden chaired the Wolfenden report. The report resulted in the Royal commission stating "it is not the function of the law to intervene in the private lives of citizens, or to seek to enforce any particular pattern of behaviour" that is not already outlined. In the end, the commission suggested that adult consensual acts kept out of the public eye, should not be subject to criminalization.

The Sexual Offences Act of 2000 lowered the age of consent for homosexual males from 18 to 16, the same as for heterosexual and lesbian individuals.

Australia began to decriminalize homosexuality in the late 20th century.

=== In the United States ===
In the 1910s, male prostitution was more about men who were identified as fairies, since they took on a more effeminate role that the male clientele was seeking. The fairies, or pansies, took on ascribed feminine mannerisms and would be referred to as inverts for inverting their sex as well as regarded as a third sex that did not fit the binary gender system. Fairies did not base their identity on their sexuality, since many male sex workers used this identity, but rather based it on their expressed gender. Not all fairies were sex workers, but many male sex workers took on the identity for their clients. The clients would take on the dominant role which was made a lot easier with the providers of the sex work being youth in the 1920s. There were also clients who preferred punks or wolves who were boys or men that took on ascribed masculine personas which was liked by some men like seamen and prisoners.

There were young men who got involved in sex work out of desperation to be able to have income since many were from the poor and/or working classes. However, society understood that all male prostitution could be explained that heterosexual men of low socioeconomic backgrounds were the ones who engaged in sex work, willing to be with other men, all for the purpose of gaining a financial foothold rather than the men engaging in prostitution because they were homosexual. Some men did turn to prostitution in hopes to gain wealth but there were others who did sex work simply because they chose to do so. Pimps were prominent on the scene of selling off young men to older men who were looking for young, same-sex relationships. Sometimes, the parents of the youth were aware of their children's actions and would support it since they would receive benefits from the older men who were paying to have sex with their sons. Other times, the young men would keep it hidden and use it as a means to be able to earn a lot of money in a quick way and would claim they only did so they don't steal or fall into line with other youth who fall into the criminal life due to poverty.

During the mid-twentieth century, male prostitution was undergoing a revolution as to what exactly the clients were looking for as well as people equating male sex work with homosexuality. Many clients who identified as straight were struggling with the onslaught of criticism that the public had towards male sex work. Male sex work was garnering attention from the public who frowned upon it, so the clientele started to shift slightly since people started to associate male sex work more with homosexuality. The clients who sought out male sex workers identified as homosexual. The clients also looked for "real men" by the 1930s, in which they wanted men to be hypermasculine rather than be fairies and young men. However, after the 1930s, due to more public scrutiny, male prostitution suffered since it drove away men from engaging in the work due to the work being associated with homosexuality. This caused an identity crisis among men who engaged in sex work since they increasingly became aware that they themselves may be homosexual, but they still needed money. The public was adamant that such behavior was unacceptable in society which wounded the male sex work community.

Male sex work had gone so far underground that it became known, or rather believed, that all male prostitutes were gay. In the 1970s, the Gay Rights movement came to be, which allowed male prostitutes to have a voice. Men engaged in sex work would go to gay bars because the bars were the only places men were able to find clients. However, it became a bit of an issue to be part of the gay community considering that even the gay community thought male sex workers were also gay which perpetuated the stigma that male prostitutes were gay. Even then many people did not see male sex work as legitimate work, but rather something that men turn towards as a last resort to earn money. Male prostitutes tried to change the narrative that their sex work was just simply work, but it did not come across nor was it really accepted by society. Gay men were harassed by police officers for soliciting sex and were often caught by police officers who wore plain clothes were monitoring gay bars. Police would often conduct raids on the gay bars and arrest people inside. Male prostitutes frequented the bars since they would find many clients inside but with the raids, they had to go into hiding so they would not be harassed for their work in commercialized sex since they relied on making a living selling their bodies.

While male sex workers were combating police enforcement of sodomy laws, particularly more so in the 1970s, they attempted to fight for their rights through the judicial system. Male prostitutes faced an ongoing battle with legislatures attempting to pass laws that criminalized male prostitution. However, most of the anti-prostitution laws were more heavily enforced on female prostitutes rather than male. It was not until 1996 in Romer v. Evans that the court stated that moral disapproval of male prostitution was not enough to constitute a statute.

During the early decades of the HIV/AIDS epidemic, there was an increase in regulation among sex workers, who were seen as high transmitters of the virus and thus a threat to public health. In effect, the Prostitution Act of 1992 and Sex Work Act of 1994 prohibited people from engaging in sex work if there was a reasonable belief that they may have or transmit any sexually transmitted disease. Laws such as the Prostitution Act of 2000 prohibited the solicitation of sexual services in public places.

The World Health Organization has called for "international decriminalization of sex work to improve the well-being of sex workers." arguing that criminalization reinforces stereotypes of deviance, disease, and delinquency, and prohibits such improvements. The WHO also recommends the establishment of anti-discrimination laws for the protection of sex worker rights. To sex workers directly, they suggested voluntary testing, consistent and correct contraceptive usage, and anti-retroviral therapy for HIV-positive workers as good practice.

== Present-day male prostitution ==
The following categorization of the male prostitute is not exhaustive:

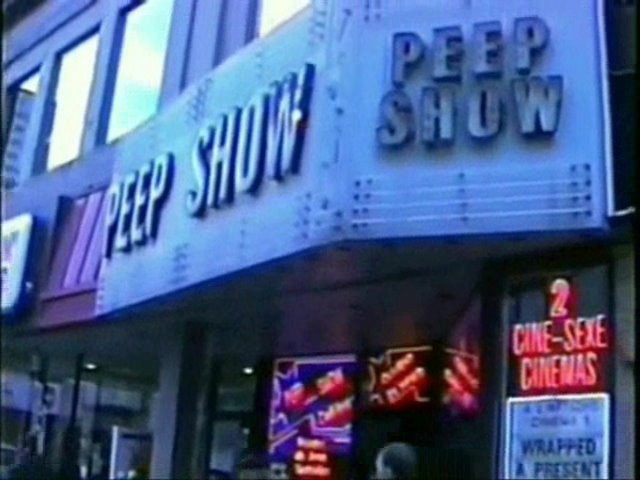
A "Peep Show" along Saint Catherine Street in Montreal's Gay Village

=== Online ===
Professional escorts (indoor sex workers) often advertise on male escorting websites, usually either independently or through an escort agency. Such sites can face legal difficulties; in 2015, Rentboy.com – a well-known American site – was shut down by the United States Department of Homeland Security and its operators charged with facilitating prostitution and other charges. Recent research suggests a substantial growth in numbers of online escorts worldwide, to the extent that the online market accounts for the vast majority of male sex workers. This has persisted despite anti-sex worker laws like the Fight Online Sex Trafficking Act in the United States, thanks in part to escorting websites based in other countries.

=== Streets, bars, and clubs ===
Major cities in Europe and the Western Hemisphere often have one or more areas where male street prostitutes regularly make themselves available to potential clients who drive by in cars. Such an area may have a locally known informal name. These areas tend to be risky for both the client and the prostitute, from a legal perspective when it is in a region where street prostitution or solicitation is prohibited by law, or also from a safety perspective. These areas may be targets for surveillance and arrests by law enforcement. Some male prostitutes solicit potential clients in other public spaces such as bus terminals, parks and rest stops.

In 1998, there were at least five male strip clubs in Mumbai, India.

==== Public toilets ====
Male prostitutes may work in public toilets in parks and establishments. Clients like this setting for various reasons. Some men like the "excitement" or rush that comes from the encounter. People have reported not being able to reach orgasm if they aren't in the toilets. In this case, the idea of almost getting caught is desirable. Other clients enjoy the anonymity and brief nature of the experience. As some clients have families and a reputation to uphold, the lavatory is convenient; they enjoy the sexual experience with minimal risk of being found out and without emotional attachment.

=== Bathhouses and sex clubs ===
Male prostitutes may attempt to work in gay bathhouses, adult bookstores or sex clubs, but prostitution is usually prohibited in such establishments, and known prostitutes are often banned by management.

=== Male brothels ===
A male prostitute may work in a male brothel.

The Cleveland Street scandal of 1889 involved a male brothel in London frequented by aristocrats when male homosexuality was illegal in the United Kingdom. In her biography The First Lady, April Ashley quotes her ex-husband, the late Hon. Arthur Corbett, who worked in the City of London, and who liked cross-dressing, as telling her in 1960: "There's a male brothel, I pay the boys to dress me up, then masturbate me."

In order to work in a legal brothel in Nevada, a cervical exam is required by law, implying that men could not work as prostitutes. In November 2005, Heidi Fleiss said that she would partner with brothel owner Joe Richards to turn Richards' legal Cherry Patch Ranch brothel in Crystal, Nevada, into an establishment that would employ male prostitutes and cater exclusively to female customers, a first in Nevada. However, in 2009, Fleiss said that she had abandoned her plans to open such a brothel. In late 2009, the owner of the Shady Lady Ranch brothel challenged this provision before the Nye County Licensing and Liquor Board and prevailed. In January 2010, the brothel hired a male prostitute who offered his services to female clients, but he left the ranch a few weeks later.

Until 2009, when all prostitution in Rhode Island was outlawed, Rhode Island did not have a law prohibiting male sex workers.

In January 2010, the first brothel for gay men in Switzerland was opened in an industrial area of Zürich.

=== Sex tourism ===
Sex tourism goes beyond the transactional exchange of sex for currency; it may involve temporary relationships, emotional, or physical intimacy. Due to the unclear parameters, these relationships have been described as "ambiguous entanglements". Gay sex tourism is found throughout Brazil in many different communities and some areas of the Amazon rainforest. Different entities throughout Brazil have focused on straight-aligned sex work and have neglected gay sex tourism. Sex tourists may travel to specific locations to enjoy a holiday and find a "temporary relationships" who will fill the roles of sexual partner, dining companion, tour guide, or dancing companion/instructor. Women who spend time with male escorts while on vacation may be any age but are predominantly middle-aged women looking for romance along with sex. The rates of HIV/AIDS and other sexually transmitted infections are high in some Caribbean and African countries, which are popular destinations for female sex tourism.

The connections established by sex tourism challenge the ways that scholars of sexuality, gender, and race by pushing back on traditional conversations about agency and resistance. Most research regarding sex tourism have been from tourist perspectives instead of the perspective of sex workers themselves. This has negated sex worker experiences and has largely only focused on negative connotations of sex tourism like child sex trafficking and sexually transmitted diseases. However, recent studies have helped problematize these oversimplifications by highlighting the economic, sexual, and racial dynamics that are leveraged by both the tourist and the sex worker in these sexual economies. In the case of women who consume male sexual labor while on vacation, scholars have previously insisted that they should not be analyzed using the same language and framework as their male counterparts because rather than sex, they were thought to have engaged in an economy of romance or "romance tourism." Women engaging in sex tourism with male sex workers are just as capable of leveraging their race, class, nationality, and other privileges in these relationships, making them far more similar to their male counterparts than the "romance tourism" model of analysis would allow.

=== Risks ===
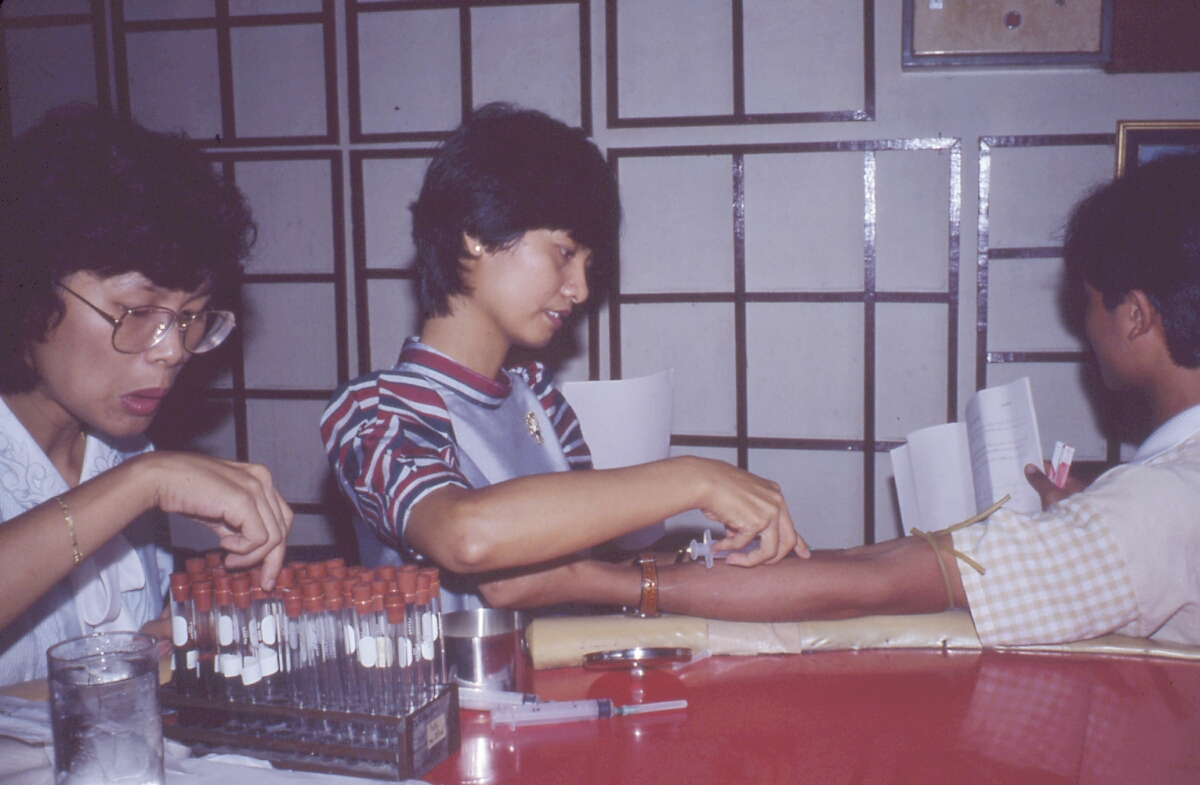
FETP testing a young sex worker for HIV in Patpong, Thailand in 1985

As in all forms of prostitution, male prostitutes and their clients can face risks and problems. For prostitutes, the risks may include: social stigma; legal/criminal risks; physical abuse; health-related risks, including the potential risk of sexually transmitted diseases; rejection by family and friends; gay bashing (in the case of male–male prostitution); the financial risks that come with having an insecure income; and risks of the mental/emotional effects that come with all of those factors. Teenagers and runaways engaging in sex work have shown to be particularly at risk. A 2008 master's thesis reported that 300,000 male prostitutes were under the age of 16.

For clients, risks may include: fear of social stigma and family or work problems if their activities with prostitutes do not remain secret; health-related risks; being robbed; falling pregnant (if a fertile woman); or, very rarely, being blackmailed or injured. German fashion designer Rudolph Moshammer, for example, was killed by a man who said that Moshammer had reneged on a promise to pay him for sex. If a male prostitute steals from a male client or accepts money without then "putting out" the agreed-upon sexual services, it is sometimes referred to as "rolling a john".

Research suggests that the degree of violence against male prostitutes is somewhat lower than for female sex workers. Men working on the street and younger men appear to be at greatest risk of being victimized by clients. Conversely, the risk of being robbed or blackmailed posed to clients of sex workers appears to be much lower than many imagine. This is especially true when clients hire sex workers through an established agency or when they hire men who have been consistently well reviewed by previous clients.

The pimp is relatively rare in male prostitution in the West, where most prostitutes generally work independently or, less frequently, through an agency.

==== Stigma ====
Factors like the difference in age, in social status and in economic status between the sex worker and his client have been cited as major sources of social criticism. Similar social stigma may also be attached to amorous relationships that do not involve direct payment for sexual services, and therefore do not fit the definition of prostitution, but which may be seen by some as a form of "quasi"-prostitution, (in that there is a power imbalance and a reward for companionship or sex). The older member in such relationships may be referred as a "sugar daddy" or "sugar momma"; the young lover may be called a "kept boy" or "boy toy". Within the gay community, the members of this kind of couple are sometimes called "dad" (or "daddy") and "son"—without implying incest. The social disdain for age/status disparity in relationships is, and has been, less pronounced in certain cultures at certain historical times.

== Help and support for male sex workers ==
In the United States and other places, there are few resources and little support readily available for male sex workers working and/or living on the streets. Men and boys in this situation may face many issues. Male sex workers are often portrayed as having complete agency and rationality, while women are more often seen as vulnerable victims. This framework contributes to the idea that men do not suffer from emotional issues. Male street prostitutes may have issues such as drug addiction. Men also omit the fact that they are sex workers more often than not. Male prostitutes keep this aspect of their lives hidden to prevent judgement and shame from being passed on to them. Because male sex workers do not disclose this information, they frequently deal with social isolation. Isolation and concealable stigma identities (negative stereotypes that can be hidden from others) can increase psychological distress, explaining the heightened vulnerability to mental health problems. Offering support and health care to such stigmatized people can be difficult due to a reluctance to disclose information about their work to health care professionals, which can also make male prostitutes difficult to identify in order to reach out to. There are now a number of organisations that exist to support male-sex-workers such as The Men's Room in Manchester.

== Feminist studies ==
The topic of male prostitution has been examined by feminist theorists. Feminist theorists Justin Gaffney and Kate Beverley stated that the insights gained from research on male sex workers in central London allowed comparison between the experiences of the 'hidden' population of male prostitutes and the traditionally subordinate position of women in a patriarchal society. Gaffney and Beverley argue that male sex workers occupy a subordinate position in our society which, as with women, is ensured by hegemonic and patriarchal constructs. At the same time, other feminists have noted that male sex workers are usually seen as engaging in sex work out of their own free will and for enjoyment much more than female sex workers, who are often perceived to be victims of human trafficking and exploitation, especially by second-wave feminist activists. A review of the public discourse and media reactions following the closing of two websites hosting sex work ads – one for women and one for gay men – found that concerns with human trafficking and victimization were cited only for the closure of the former. The closure of the latter was attributed to homophobia and conservative religious values.

== Popular culture ==
The male prostitute has become a literary and cinematic stereotype in the West. He is often portrayed as a tragic figure. Examples in film include Oscar-winner Midnight Cowboy (1969), about a tragic would-be gigolo; My Own Private Idaho (1991), about the friendship of two young hustlers; Mandragora (1997), about young runaways who are manipulated into prostitution; and Mysterious Skin (2004) in which a hustler has a history of being molested as a child.

The male prostitute may be presented as an impossible object of love or an idealized rebel such as in The Roman Spring of Mrs. Stone (1961) about a middle-aged woman and a young gigolo in a tragic tryst. Though less frequent in cinema and in novels, the gigolo (a male prostitute with an exclusively female clientele) is generally depicted as less tragic than the gay hustler. In the film American Gigolo, Richard Gere stars as a high-priced gigolo who becomes romantically involved with a prominent politician's wife while simultaneously becoming the prime suspect in a murder case. The comedy-drama TV series Hung (2009–2011) is about a high-school basketball coach who turns to prostitution to deal with financial troubles. Male prostitution is sometimes the subject of derisive humor, such as the slapstick farce Deuce Bigalow: Male Gigolo (1999) and its sequel (2005), while movies such as Good Luck to You, Leo Grande (2022) paint its male protagonist as intelligent, charming, sensitive, professional, and offering a valuable sexual service for his clients.

== See also ==
- Age of consent
- Male promiscuity
- Male prostitution in Bangladesh

== Bibliography ==
- Aggleton, Peter (1999). Men Who Sell Sex: International Perspectives on Male Prostitution and AIDS. Philadelphia: Temple University Press. ISBN 978-1-56639-669-1. Archived from the original on 2009-03-14.
- Elias, James (1998). Prostitution : on whores, hustlers, and johns. Prometheus. ISBN 978-1-57392-229-6. OCLC 39379620.
- Friedman, Mack (2003). Strapped for cash : a history of American hustler culture. Alyson Books. ISBN 978-1-55583-731-0. OCLC 51607360.
- Itiel, Joseph (1998). A Consumer's Guide to Male Hustlers. Routledge. ISBN 978-0-7890-0596-0.
- Itiel, Joseph (2002). Sex Workers As Virtual Boyfriends. Routledge. ISBN 978-1-56023-191-2.
- Koken, Juline; Bimbi, David; Parsons, Jeffrey (2000). "Male and Female Escorts: A Comparative Analysis". Sex for Sale: Prostitution, Pornography, and the Sex Industry. Routledge. ISBN 978-0-415-92295-1.
- Lawrence, Aaron (2000). The Male Escort's Handbook: Your Guide to Getting Rich the Hard Way. Late Night Press. ISBN 978-0-9667691-1-1.
- Lumsden, Ian (1996). Machos, maricones, and gays: Cuba and homosexuality. Temple University Press. p. 7. ISBN 978-1-56639-371-3.
- Padilla, Mark (2007). Caribbean pleasure industry: tourism, sexuality, and AIDS in the Dominican Republic. University of Chicago Press. ISBN 978-0-226-64436-3.
- Preston, John (1994). Hustling: a gentleman's guide to the fine art of homosexual prostitution. Masquerade Books. ISBN 978-1-56333-137-4.
- Saunders, Dean (2008). Nice Work If You Can Get It. John Blake. ISBN 978-1-84454-509-4.
- Steward, Samuel M. (1991). Understanding the male hustler. Routledge. ISBN 978-1-56024-111-9.
- Sycamore, Matt Bernstein (2000). Tricks and treats: sex workers write about their clients. Routledge. ISBN 978-0-7890-0703-2.
- Taylor, Jacqueline Sánchez (1997). "Marking the margins: research in the informal economy in Cuba and the Dominican Republic". Leicester University discussion papers in sociology, no S97/1. University of Leicester, Faculty of Social Sciences, Dept. of Sociology. OCLC 37157551.
- Taylor, Jacqueline Sanchez (2001). "Dollars Are a Girl's Best Friend? Female Tourists' Sexual Behaviour in the Caribbean" (PDF). Sociology. 35 (3): 749–764. doi:10.1177/s0038038501000384. ISSN 0038-0385. OCLC 367611972. S2CID 67792112.
- Weitzer, Ronald John (2000). Sex for Sale: Prostitution, Pornography, and the Sex Industry. Routledge. ISBN 9780415922944.
- Weitzer, Ronald (2010). Sex for Sale: Prostitution, Pornography, and the Sex Industry. Routledge. ISBN 978-0-415-92295-1.
- Weitzer, Ronald (2011). "Male Prostitution". In Bryant, Clifton (ed.). The Routledge Handbook of Deviant Behavior. New York: Routledge.

Minichiello, Victor; Scott, John Geoffrey (2014). Male Sex Work and Society. Harrington Park Press. ISBN 9781939594037.Quinn, Diane M; Earnshaw, Valerie A. (January 2013). "Concealable Stigmatized Identities and Psychological Well-Being". Social and Personality Psychology Compass. 7 (1): 40–51. doi:10.1111/spc3.12005. PMC 3664915. PMID 23730326.Pruitt, Sarah (2020-06-01). "What Happened at the Stonewall Riots? A Timeline of the 1969 Uprising". History.
