= Setz =

Setz is a German surname. Notable people with the surname include:

- Clemens J. Setz (born 1982), Austrian writer and translator
- Heinrich Setz (1915–1943), German World War II flying ace
- Wolfram Setz (1941–2023), German historian, editor, translator, and essayist
