= William Dugdale (disambiguation) =

Sir William Dugdale (1605–1686) was an English antiquary.

William Dugdale may also refer to:

- William Dugdale (publisher) (1800–1868), an English publisher, printer, and bookseller of politically subversive publications and pornographic literature
- William Stratford Dugdale (1800–1871), a British Tory (and later Conservative Party) politician.
- Sir William Dugdale, 2nd Baronet (1922–2014), chairman of Aston Villa Football Club
