= Jack Saul =

Jack Saul may refer to:

- John Saul (prostitute), also known as Jack Saul, Irish prostitute
- Jack Saul (tennis) South African-Israeli tennis player
