= Nigel Tourneur =

British pseudonymous author

Nigel Tourneur was the pseudonym of a fin de siecle writer who is best known for his work Hidden Witchery, a collection of seven short stories and a short prose drama. Set in the indeterminate past, these sensually charged stories are concerned with obsessive love, often given a macabre or supernatural twist. In an "advertisement" the author writes: ". . . Throughout the following stories and sketches — scantily in part, and, it is feared, obscurely, through symbolism — there may be traced the inception, growth, strength, awaywardness and maturity of its physical manhood, culminating in self-knowledge and abnegation. . . " Hidden Witchery was published in 1898 an edition of 450 copies by Leonard Smithers, with illustrations by Will G. Mein.

A review in The Outlook commented:

"'Nigel Tourneur,' the author of 'Hidden Witchery' (Smithers), the latest contribution to symbolistic literature, is a Scot, and a literary critic of advanced and independent views. He calls 'Hidden Witchery' a 'tentative' book, and there seems little doubt that the writer's undoubted power will sooner or later find a very different artistic outlet. But the present volume, curious mixture that it is, has touches of exceptionally happy artistry."

As well as short stories, Nigel Tourneur wrote travel and historical articles and his work was published in British and American magazines including the Overland Monthly, Westward Ho!, Scottish Art & Letters, The Gentleman's Magazine, the Commonweal, Child's Own Magazine, and the Catholic World.
