= The Autobiography of a Flea =

1887 erotic novel

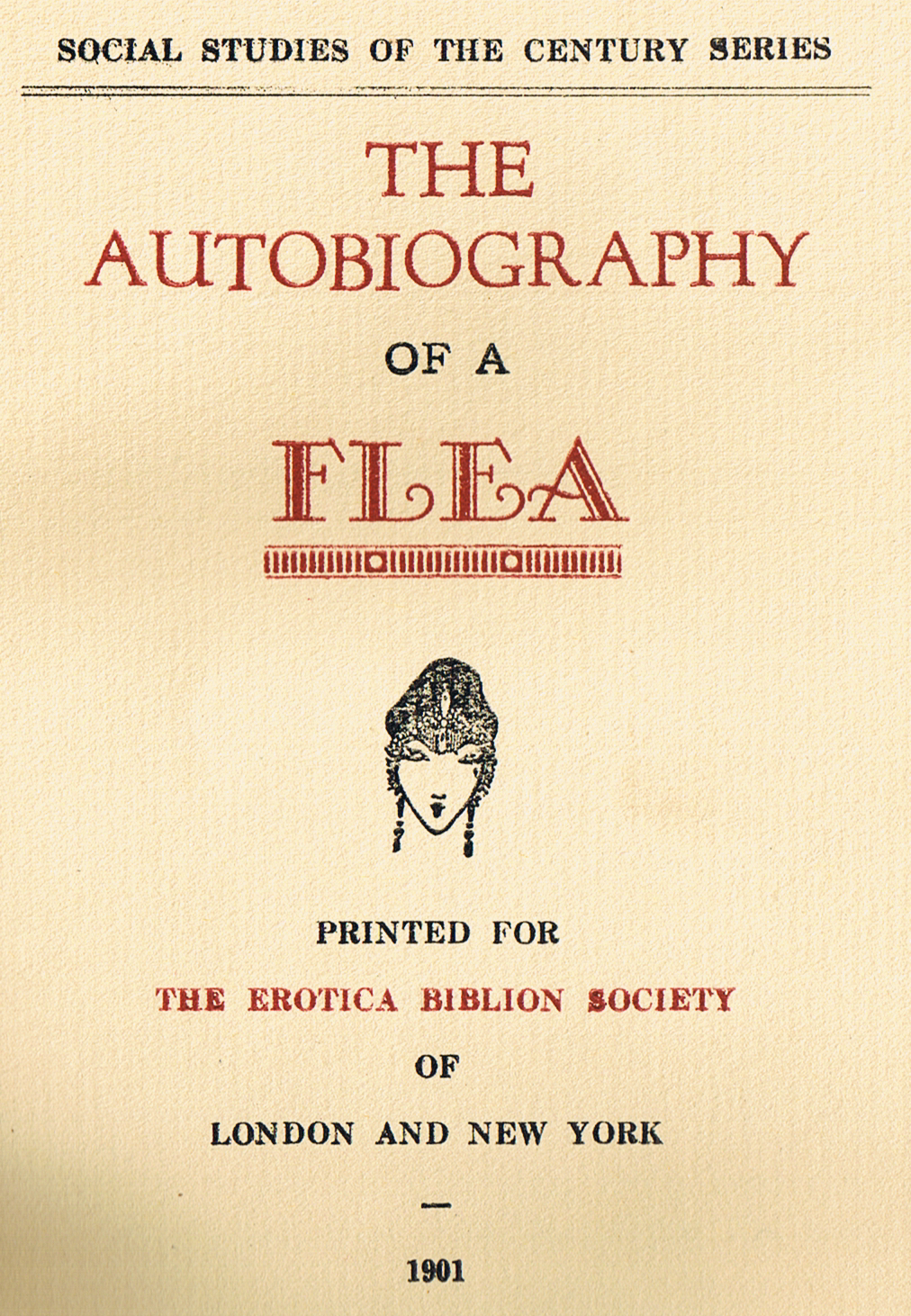
- Title page of the falsely dated "1901" edition (actually published c. 1935)
- Author: Anonymous
- Language: English
- Genre: Erotic novel
- Publisher: Edward Avery
- Publication date: 1887
- Publication place: United Kingdom
- Media type: Print (hardcover)
- Pages: 274 pp
- OCLC: 48562620

The Autobiography of a Flea is an anonymous erotic novel first published in 1887 in London by Edward Avery. Later research has revealed that the author was a London lawyer of the time named Stanislas de Rhodes.

The story is narrated by a flea who tells the tale of a beautiful young girl named Bella, whose burgeoning sexuality is taken advantage of by her young lover Charlie, the local priest Father Ambrose and two of his colleagues in holy orders. Bella is then employed to procure her best friend, Julia, for the sexual enjoyment of both the priests and of Julia's own father.

The book was adapted into a 1976 pornographic film (see § Film adaptation).

== Plot ==
The plot begins with Bella in church. As she leaves, young Charlie pushes a note into her hand. She reads that he will be in their usual meeting place at eight o' clock in the evening. She meets him in a garden. After some playful conversation, Charlie introduces her to her first sexual experience. Father Ambrose, who had been hiding in the shrubs, surprises them afterward, scolding both for their behaviour and threatening to reveal what they have been doing to their guardians. Bella pleads for mercy. Father Ambrose, appearing to relent, tells Bella to meet him in the sacristy at two pm the next day and Charlie to meet him at the same time the day after that. Ambrose instructs Bella into a way she may be absolved of her sins and blackmails her into sex with him, lest he tell her guardian what she was up to. Then Ambrose's colleagues, the Fr. Superior & Fr. Clement, catch them in the act, and demand equal rights to Bella's favours. And so Bella is introduced to serving the Holy community in a special way.

Despite his promises, Fr. Ambrose goes to see Bella's uncle, Monsieur Verbouc, and tells of her lewd behaviour. This leads to her uncle, who has long entertained lustful thoughts of his niece, attempting to force himself on Bella. The narrator then intervenes, biting him to put a dampener on his ardour.

Next, Fr. Clement, looking for Bella's room, climbs into the window of Bella's aunt, the pious Madame Verbouc, who mistakes him for her husband. Monsieur Verbouc then bursts in and his wife realises that she has actually been making love to the randy priest.

Bella's friend, Julia Delmont, becomes Fr. Ambrose's next target. By now completely corrupted and happy to go along with whatever Fr. Ambrose suggests, Bella readily agrees to the Father's next scheme: she will offer herself to Monsieur Delmont, Julia's father, on condition that her face is covered. The trick is that it will not be Bella who lies there, but Delmont's own daughter. Fr. Ambrose seduces Julia and says he will come to her by night and make love to her, but she must hide her face.

When the act is consummated, Bella appears and pretends that it was all a big mistake. But since Delmont has now potentially impregnated his daughter, the only way to be sure his incest cannot be discovered is to have all make love to her as well. In case she is pregnant, nobody can claim that her own father is the baby's father.

Bella and Julia eventually become nuns, and the book ends as they participate in an orgy with 14 priests.

== Characters ==
=== The Flea ===
The Narrator of the story is a flea. The novel begins with the flea asserting that though he gets his living by blood sucking, he is "not the lowest of that universal fraternity". The flea further asserts that his intelligence and abilities of observation and communication are comparable to a human, and demurs from any explanation of the cause, adding that he is "in truth a most wonderful and exalted insect". The unusual narrator allows the story to be written from the viewpoint of a character who neither participates in nor necessarily approves of the sex scenes, and the movement of the narrator between the bodies of the different characters allows the action to follow different characters at different times. Despite ostensibly being written from the first person the novel includes descriptions of the feelings and intentions of various characters which seem more fitting with a third person limited omniscient narrator.

=== Bella ===
The main character of the book, Bella, is an orphan who lives with her uncle and aunt. At the beginning of the story she is 14 and is described as being the admired one of all eyes and the desired one of all hearts – at any rate among the male sex. She begins the book sexually naive, but inquisitive.

=== Charlie ===
Very little description is given of Charlie, and after a brief mention in Chapter 3 he ceases to play any part in the story.

=== Father Ambrose ===
A priest aged 45, described as having a handsome face, with jet black eyes and as being short and stout. The narrator says Ambrose's mind is dedicated to the pursuit of lust, and much of the novel's plot is due to his machinations. After initiating Bella into the ways of unrestrained sensuality, and planning to keep her for himself, he is discovered by the Brother Superior and Brother Clement, who insist he share Bella with them. Many scenes of multiple acts of all varieties ensue. Ultimately, Ambrose decides to expand the circle of debauchery by insisting Bella involve her friend the fair and innocent Julia Delmont.

=== Father Clement ===
Father Clement is one of the "brothers" of Father Ambrose and is a participant and co conspirator in the seduction of Bella. He is described as ugly and possessed of an absolutely gargantuan penis. A memorable scene occurs when Clement mistakes the bedroom he believes is occupied by Bella, and throws himself on Bella's puritanical and rigid aunt. After initially believing the advances are those of her husband, with whom she has not been intimate in many years, she feels Clement's enormous size, and leaps up. Clement forces her down, and after initial resistance, she succumbs. They are discovered and Clement escapes out the window. Bella's aunt goes progressively insane, screaming for the "priest with the big tool".

== Publication history ==
- 1887, The Autobiography of a Flea, Told in a Hop, Skip and Jump, and ... first published in London by Edward Avery in a small edition of 150 copies. The title page of this edition (falsely) claims that it was "Published by Authority of the Phlebomotical Society, Cytheria, 1789."
- 1890, first French translation.
- 1895, English reprint (probably by Charles Carrington).
- c. 1935, falsely dated "1901" edition published for The Erotica Biblion Society of London and New York, Hardcover. In this work the flea recounts a completely different story from that of the first edition.
- 1967, United States, Greenleaf Classics, Paperback.
- 1968, United States, Pendulum Books, Paperback.
- 1984, United Kingdom, Nexus, Paperback.
- 2004, The Autobiography of a Flea by Anonymous. United States, Olympia Press ISBN 1-59654-050-8. Paperback.
- 2009, The Autobiography of a Flea by Stanislas de Rhodes. Harper Perennial Forbidden Classics. Paperback.

== Film adaptation ==
The Autobiography of a Flea was adapted into a film in 1976 directed by Sharon McNight from her own screenplay. Jean Jennings played Bella, Paul Thomas played Father Ambrose and John Holmes played Father Clement.
