= John Saul (prostitute) =

Irish homosexual prostitute of the Victorian era

- Born: Johannes Saul; 29 October 1857; Dublin, Ireland
- Died: 28 August 1904 (aged 46); Our Lady's Hospice, Harold's Cross, Ireland
- Resting place: Glasnevin Cemetery, Glasnevin, Dublin, Ireland
- Other name: Dublin Jack
- Known for: Dublin Castle scandal Cleveland Street scandal The Sins of the Cities of the Plain
- Parent(s): Guilelmus Saul; Eliza Revington Saul

John Saul (29 October 1857 – 28 August 1904), also known as Jack Saul and Dublin Jack, was an Irish sex worker. He featured in two major homosexual scandals, and as a character in two works of pornographic literature of the period. Considered "notorious in Dublin and London" and "made infamous by the sensational testimony he gave in the Cleveland Street scandal", which was published in newspapers around the world, he was later the subject of scholarly analysis and speculation. One reason is the paucity of information on the lives and outlook of individual male prostitutes of the period. Saul has also come to be seen by some as a defiant individual in a society that sought to repress him: "a figure of abjection who refuses his status".

== Early life ==
Christened Johannes (John) Saul, he was born in 1857 in a Dublin tenement slum to a hackney cab driver Guilelmus (William) Saul, and Eliza Revington. He was the second child and eldest son of eventually eight children; his parents did not marry until he was six months old, possibly because Eliza was underage.

As a poor Catholic youth, Saul's opportunities were limited. At eighteen he was charged with committing an indecent offence. Giving testimony in the later Cleveland Street scandal, Saul called himself "a professional Mary-ann" – a period euphemism for rentboy, and stated: "I have lost my character and cannot get on otherwise. I occasionally do odd-jobs for different gay people."

In 1878, Saul was working as a servant in the Dublin home of wealthy and prominent young doctor John Joseph Cranny. In October that year Saul and a friend, William Clarke, were arrested for burglary and the theft of a coat, walking stick, gloves and a salt-cellar from Cranny's home. The items were not claimed by Cranny and both youths were acquitted.

Prior to the case coming to trial, Saul was briefly imprisoned, where he was recorded as being fair and blue-eyed with a fair complexion.

In 1879, he moved to London, sending home money to his mother who was very poor.

== Scandals ==
=== Dublin Castle scandal ===
In 1884, Irish nationalists alleged homosexual orgies among the staff at Dublin Castle, the seat of the British government's administration in Ireland until 1922. Amongst those charged with conspiracy to commit gross indecency was Martin Oranmore Kirwan (1847–1904), a captain in the Royal Irish Fusiliers who was the son of a County Galway Anglo-Irish landlord.

When Kirwan was a young lieutenant in the Dublin Militia, Saul had been one of his sexual partners. In 1884, Saul was interviewed by the police, and together with a John Daly who had also been frequently mentioned in the case, was brought from London to Ireland to be a Crown witness. Saul was never called to give testimony – a matter which is still cause for speculation. Saul later stated on the witness stand that he was told that it wasn't because of his disreputable character that his testimony wasn't used, but because his evidence was too old, relating to events of a considerably earlier date. His record of interview was destroyed in the Irish Civil War. Kirwan was acquitted on the grounds that the Crown did not produce sufficient evidence, but he resigned his commission.

=== At Drury Lane ===
In 1889, before news of the Cleveland Street scandal, Saul was briefly employed at Drury Lane Theatre in The Royal Oak, a five-act romantic drama spectacle based on the concealment of Charles II in the Boscobel Oak after the Battle of Worcester, that opened in September of that year. Whether he worked behind the scenes or appeared on-stage in one of its tableaus is unknown: his name does not appear in the speaking-parts cast list. However, it was during the time Alexander Meyrick Broadley, aka 'Broadley Pasha', who was implicated in the Cleveland Street Scandal, was acting as a financial and business adviser to the manager of the theatre Augustus Harris.

=== Cleveland Street scandal ===
After living at a succession of addresses in London, in 1887 Saul had moved into a male brothel at 19 Cleveland Street run by fellow prostitute Charles Hammond, with whom he had previously lived. Saul was one of several professionals working there, but telegraph boys were also recruited for part-time work. In 1889, when one of the boys was questioned at the General Post Office regarding how he obtained a sum of money in his possession, the Cleveland Street scandal broke, creating news stories around the globe. The first trial that resulted was a libel action by Lord Euston, heir to the Duke of Grafton, against Ernest Parke, editor of the North London Press. Parke had alleged Euston had been a visitor to the male brothel at the centre of the scandal. It came to court in January 1890, and Saul was called as a witness for the defence.

Saul delivered his testimony in a manner described in one newspaper report as "brazen effrontery that reduced the court to shocked silence" and detailed his sexual encounter with Euston in the brothel in explicit language that shocked the court. He was also sharp, witty, and defiant. The line of questioning and his responses included:

"And were you hunted out by the police?" – "No, they have never interfered. They have always been kind to me."
"Do you mean they have deliberately shut their eyes to your infamous practices?" – "They have had to shut their eyes to more than me."

In the assessment of one scholar "Saul refused to play the role assigned to him." Unlike the messenger boys, he was a professional prostitute, and upended the hitherto simplistic narrative of one-sided exploitation of victimised youths. At one point of the proceedings, a newspaper report noted that Saul "referred to himself as having nothing in his face but shame, and here he took out a handkerchief."

In his summing up, the judge asked the jury to assess whether they could possibly accept the word of a "loathsome object" against that of Lord Euston. Parke was found guilty of libel and imprisoned. However Saul's testimony is likely to have been the truth, as Euston was well known in the homosexual underworld and was later subject to repeated blackmail.

Despite Saul's confession of prostitution on the witness stand, the Attorney General declined to prosecute him. The reason is unknown. Given Saul's revelations and manner as a mere witness – which had been considered shocking enough, and the unproven rumour then circulating in high society and police circles that Prince Albert Victor had visited the brothel, it may be that the authorities were concerned over what he would have said, or whom he may have implicated, had he been placed in the position of having to defend himself. One scholar has suggested his deposition alone was so inflammatory it may have protected him.

The Euston libel trial was Saul's last appearance in the press. He became a servant at a small family-run hotel, the Marlborough, at 23 Villiers Street in the Strand, before returning to Dublin, where in 1901 he was registered as a butler. In the Euston trial he confessed to having been in hospital several times, and in 1904 he was admitted by his younger brother James to Our Lady's Hospice, Harold's Cross, where he died of tuberculosis aged 46. He is buried in Glasnevin Cemetery in an unmarked grave.

== The Sins of the Cities of the Plain ==
The alleged memoirs of Saul were published in an anonymously authored and clandestinely published 1881 erotic book The Sins of the Cities of the Plain or Recollections of a Mary-Ann, With Short Essays on Sodomy and Tribadism. It is more likely to be an early form of the non-fiction novel, although Saul may have contributed. In the words of one scholar: "Although some of the details of Sins...are exaggerated for effect, it is based upon fact." It has been suggested that Simeon Solomon, who knew the publisher William Lazenby, was involved. Another author who has been suggested is James Campbell Reddie, who had been convicted of public indecency in 1873 and disgraced. This is less likely as Reddie died several years before the book's publication, and was ill with poor eyesight prior to that.

Saul's character is described as possessing "a fresh looking beardless face, with almost feminine features, auburn hair and sparkling blue eyes…and endowed by a very extraordinary development of the male appendage". Asked by a prospective customer to provide his name, this character replies: "Saul, Jack Saul, Sir, of Lisle Street, Leicester Square, and ready for a lark with a free gentleman at any time."

In the book Saul is picked up on the street by a 'Mr Chambon' who, charmed by his looks and story, pays him five pounds a week to write his memoirs. Chambon lives "in the Cornwall Mansions close to Baker Street Station". William Simpson Potter, who was a friend of William Lazenby the publisher, did live at Cornwall Residences, a now-demolished block of nondescript Victorian flats near the Station, from about 1877 until his death in 1889. Potter was the 'compiler' of another anonymous piece of the erotica A Letter from the East (1877) as well as Letters from India during HRH the Prince of Wales' Visit in 1875/6 (1876). Mr Chambon could be based on Potter, who was also a friend of Henry Spencer Ashbee, and it is possible Potter may have been the connection to the real Saul.

Saul's cross-dressing persona 'Evelina' appears in the 1883 sequel Letters from Laura and Eveline, Giving an Account of Their Mock-Marriage, Wedding Trip, etc. Published as an Appendix to Sins of the Cities.

== Legacy ==
A biography of Saul, The Sins of Jack Saul by Glenn Chandler, the writer of television detective series Taggart, was published in 2016, with a revised 2nd edition issued later the same year. It revealed hitherto unknown details about Saul's life before and after Cleveland Street. A musical of the same name based on the book, written by Chandler with lyrics by Charles Miller, premiered in London in May 2016, in which Jack McCann originated the role of Jack Saul.

No photograph of Saul is known to exist. However, in 2020 Glenn Chandler was contacted by a reader of his biography who owned a paper-mache head of a smiling young male which had been purchased in a Paris flea market years before. It bears a metal plate reading "Jack Saul 1890". While possibly an authentic likeness, it has also been suggested it may be a shop dummy head: an objet trouvé repurposed.

Saul has also featured prominently in a large number of academic studies, and histories, including Morris Kaplan's Who's Afraid of John Saul?, Neil McKenna's The Secret Life of Oscar Wilde and Fanny and Stella: The Young Men Who Shocked England, and three books on the Cleveland Street Scandal, including Theo Aronson's Prince Eddy and the Homosexual Underworld.

Saul also partially inspired Jonathan Kemp's novel London Triptych.

He appears as an embittered older prostitute and narrator in the 2011 stage show Cleveland Street: The Musical by Glenn Chandler and Matt Devereaux.

He was played by Simon Cuff in the 1973 TV series Jack the Ripper, in a dramatisation of his evidence in the Cleveland Street trial.

== Bibliography ==
- Aronson, Theo Prince Eddy and the Homosexual Underworld, Barnes and Noble, 1995
- Butters, Ronald R; Clum, John M.; Moon, Michael Displacing Homophobia: Gay Male Perspectives in Literature and Culture, Duke University Press, 1989
- Cafferky, John; Hannafin, Kevin Scandal and Betrayal: Shackleton and the Irish Crown Jewels, The Collins Press, 2002
- Chandler, Glenn; The Sins Of Jack Saul, Grosvenor House Publishing, 2016, ISBN 978-1781489918
- Cocks, H.G. Nameless offences: Homosexual desire in the 19th century, I.B. Tauris Publishers, London 2003
- Cohen, William Sex Scandal: The Private Parts of Victorian Fiction, Duke University Press, 1996
- Coleman, J Rent: Same-Sex Prostitution in Modern Britain, 1885-1957, University of Kentucky, 2014
- Cook, Matt London and the Culture of Homosexuality, Cambridge University Press, 2003
- Delgado, Anne Scandals In Sodom: The Victorian City's Queer Streets, Studies in the Literary Imagination, Vol 40, No1, 2007
- Hyde, Montgomery The Cleveland Street Scandal, London 1976
- Kaplan, Morris Sodom on the Thames: Sex, Love, and Scandal in Wilde Times, Cornell University Press, New York, 2005
- Kaplan, Morris (1999). "Who's Afraid of John Saul? Urban Culture and the Politics of Desire in Late Victorian London". GLQ: A Journal of Lesbian and Gay Studies. 5 (3): 267–314. doi:10.1215/10642684-5-3-267. S2CID 140452093.
- Lacy, Brian Terrible Queer Creatures: A History of Homosexuality in Ireland, Wordwell 2009
- McKenna, Neil The Secret Life of Oscar Wilde, Century, 2003
- McKenna, Neil Fanny and Stella: The Young Men Who Shocked England, Faber & Faber, 2013
- Reay, B Writing the modern histories of homosexual England, The Historical Journal, Cambridge University Press, 2009
- Reed, Jeremy The 'Dilly: A Secret History of Piccadilly Rent Boys, Peter Owen Publishers 2014
- Simpson, Colin; Chester, Lewis; Leitch, David The Cleveland Street Affair, 1977
