= The Amatory Experiences of a Surgeon =

The Amatory Experiences of a Surgeon is a pornographic novel by James Campbell Reddie under the pseudonym of "James Campbell" published in London (although the title page asserts Moscow) in 1881. The narrative gives a view of Victorian abortion.
