= Simon Cuff =

British actor (1944–2017)

- Born: Simon Richard Cuff; 1 July 1944; London, England
- Died: 30 January 2017 (aged 72); London, England
- Occupation: Actor
- Years active: 1969–2000
- Notable work: Doctor in the House

Simon Richard Cuff (1 July 1944 — 30 January 2017) was a British actor. He was best known for playing David Briddock in Doctor in the House.

== Biography ==
Cuff's first role was as Ringo in an episode of The Very Merry Widow and How in 1969. His biggset role came when he portrayed Dave Briddock in the sitcom Doctor in the House, the first of the Doctor series', from 1969 to 1970. Cuff's other roles in the 70s included as Dr. John McCabe in two episodes of Freewheelers in 1971, John Saul in an episode of Jack the Ripper in 1973, George Taylor in a 1974 episode of Z-Cars, and Dave in two episodes of Rooms in 1974 and 1976. From 1972 to 1975, he was in the drama series The Black Arrow; in series one he played a chief outlaw and from series 2 and 3, was recast as the titular character, replacing Robin Langford.

In 1987, he played Alexis in four episodes of A Dorothy L. Sayers Mystery and that same year portrayed Inspector Davis in a radio adaptation of The Murder of Roger Ackroyd, which was eventually released as a cassette. His final television role came in 1994 when he played a husband in the short film Home Away from Home. He worked as a visual effects technical consultant in the 2000 Disney film Dinosaur.

Cuff died on 30 January 2017. He was last recorded as living in the SE postcode area (South East London).

== Filmography ==
Year	Title	Role	Notes
1969	The Very Merry Widow and How	Ringo	One episode
1969	All Star Comedy Carnival	Dave Briddock	Television special
1969—1970	Doctor in the House	Dave Briddock	Nineteen episodes
1971	Freewheelers	Dr. John McCabe	Two episodes
1972—1975	The Black Arrow	Chief Outlaw (series 1) Richard Shelton (series 2/3)	
1973	Jack the Ripper	John Saul	One episode
1974	Z-Cars	George Taylor	One episode
1974, 1976	Rooms	Dave	Two episodes
1987	A Dorothy L. Sayers Mystery	Alexis	Four episodes
1994	Hoem Away from Home	Husband	Short film
