= Charles Hirsch (bookseller) =

Charles Hirsch (c. 1860 – ) was a French bookseller in Victorian London who sold French literature and ran a clandestine trade in expensive pornography. He was involved in the writing of Teleny, or The Reverse of the Medal, an early work of homosexual pornography, and described Oscar Wilde's involvement in its compilation.

Hirsch's bookshop Librairie Parisienne was at Coventry Street, London. He also published in Paris and translated pornographic works from French to English and vice versa. In 1899, he was charged with distributing indecent material and was sentenced to nine months in Wormwood Scrubs. He published a translation of Teleny into French in 1934.

== Hirsch and Wilde ==
Hirsch knew Oscar Wilde, and claimed to have sold him various works of erotica, including The Sins of the Cities of the Plain in 1890.

Hirsch describes how Wilde brought the manuscript of Teleny to his bookshop in 1890 instructing that it be held until a friend, who would be carrying Wilde's card, came to retrieve it. "A few days later one of the young gentlemen I had seen with [Wilde] came to collect the package. He kept it for a while and then brought it back saying in turn: 'Would you kindly give this to one of our friends who will come to fetch it in the same person's name'". Hirsch recounts three further repetitions of this "identical ceremony" before the package made its way back to Wilde. Hirsch defied the strict instructions not to open the package while it was in his care, and claims that it was written in several different hands, which lends further support to his supposition that it was authored in "round robin" style by a small group of Wilde's intimate associates.
