= List of pornographic book publishers =

This list contains notable publishing organizations (past and present) and imprints that specialize in pornographic books.

- Black Lace, an erotic imprint with solely female authors.
- Circlet Press, a publisher of science fiction and fantasy erotica.
- Cleis Press, a publisher of erotica with a focus on, Women's, LGBT, and BDSM erotica.
- Ellora's Cave, an erotic fiction publisher.
- Erotika Biblion Society was an erotic publisher from 1888 to 1909 based in London.
- Greenery Press, a publisher specializing in non-fiction books on sexuality.
- Greenleaf Classics, a large publisher of erotic fiction, primarily in the 1950s and 1960s, located in San Diego, California.
- Grove Press, an American alternative books publisher established in 1951.
- Nexus Books, an erotic imprint focusing on BDSM.
- Olympia Press, a Paris-based publisher launched in 1953 that no longer publishes
- Smut Peddler Presents, an erotic imprint specializing in queer and female-centric graphic novels.

== See also ==
- Erotic literature
