= James Campbell Reddie =

James Campbell Reddie WS (26 November 1807 – 4 July 1878) was a 19th-century British solicitor, collector and author of pornography, who, writing as "James Campbell", worked for the publisher William Dugdale. According to Henry Spencer Ashbee, Reddie was self-taught and viewed his works from a philosophical point of view.

== Ancestry and family ==
The information in this section is gleaned from original birth, marriage and death records and last wills and testaments

James Campbell Reddie was born on 26 November 1807 in Glasgow, Scotland, the third of eight children born to James Reddie Sr. (1775–1852) and Charlotte Marion Campbell (1782–1841).

James, Sr. was the son of John Reddie (1727–1805), a merchant in Dysart, Fife, Scotland, and May Burd (1744–1815). John and May married on 26 October 1766, in Tannadice, Scotland. James Sr. became the Principal town clerk and assessor to the magistrates of Glasgow 1804, after entering the Faculty of Advocates in 1797. He married Charlotte Campbell on 12 August 1805, in Glasgow. Charlotte was the daughter of James Campbell (c. 1735–1800) and Marion Muirhead (1739–1815). James and Marion married on 30 August 1763, in Govan, Scotland.

It appears James Reddie Sr. and his son were estranged from the time James Jr. was a young adult until the death of his father in 1852; a father who didn't even know if his son was alive or not. James Sr. left the bulk of his estate to his daughter, Charlotte, who took care of her father during the last years of his life. However, he did leave his son "the splendid Works of Voltaire in 72 volumes". The following is an excerpt from James Sr.'s will in regards to his son:

My second son James after his Professional Education Apprentice fee he received but little from me. Several of my plans for promoting and extending his business failed and as requested I had to give him a large Cash Credit with the Royal Bank - But being Cautioner for him to the Royal Bank to the extent of Two thousand Pounds and Interest. I have since he left us in the summer of 1845 had to pay to that bank for him in interim payments Four hundred pounds and upward of Two hundred and fifty pounds so as to reduce the Balance due to One Thousand six hundred Pounds for which I have assigned in security and payment of One thousand six hundred Pounds my life Policy with the Provident Office London worth at my death upwards of One thousand six hundred and forty Pounds - James therefore if alive has nothing to receive at my death.

== Occupations ==
=== Writer to the Signet ===
Reddie was known by his full legal name in Edinburgh, Scotland, where he worked as a Writer to the Signet, beginning his apprenticeship under David Cleghorn on 10 December 1829. He continued in this profession until he relocated to England in 1849, where he took the name James Campbell, dropping his father's surname in favour of his mother's.

=== Writer and translator ===
The first appearance of a "James Campbell" in England was in the 1851 English census, in which he was recorded as living at 32 White Hart Street in Westminster, and employed as a compositor (typesetter). In the 1861 census he was a lodger at 24 Manor-terrace in Newington, London, employed as a writer and translator. In 1871 he was living with the Adamo Pedroletti family, at 44 Brecknock Road in Islington, London, England, and was at 26 Brecknock Crescent in 1875.

Reddie ("Campbell") is best known as an author and translator of erotica. Many of the original texts and translations of erotic literature published by William Lazenby and William Dugdale were the work of "James Campbell". One of the earliest publications featuring the work of "Campbell" (still in Scotland at the time) was Dugdale's risqué newspaper The Exquisite. Published from 1842 to 1844, The Exquisite contained "... a great number of tales from the French, with a few from the Italian, translated for the most part, if not entirely, by James Campbell ..."

According to Henry Spencer Ashbee, Reddie was a serious, exacting collector and bibliographer of erotica. When he acquired a new book he would immediately collate it, investigate every available authority on it, and compare the book page by page and word by word with any other issue of the same work. If he was unable to acquire a scarce book, he frequently made copies by hand. He never refused to lend a book from his vast collection, even though often the borrower would forget to return it. Reddie was always liberal with his knowledge of erotica, imparting information gave him great satisfaction, and he spared neither time and labor in his research.

== Fabricated Letters ==
In 2016, the collector Patrick Kearney published "transcriptions" of a collection of five letters reportedly written by Reddie, which contain details about Reddie's personal life and work in the pornography trade. In 2025, Kearney confessed that he had fabricated the letters along with at least one entry in a bibliography.

== Death ==
In April 1877, Reddie decided to leave England and return to Scotland due to ill-health. On 25 July 1877, shortly before his departure, he sold his collection of erotica to Ashbee for £300. He also gave Ashbee his three volume manuscript Bibliographical Notes on Books, which was an invaluable resource for Ashbee in preparing the second and third volumes of his Bibliography of Prohibited Books (vol.1: 1877, vol.2: 1879, vol.3: 1885).

On 4 July 1878, in Crieff, Perth, Scotland, James Campbell Reddie died from a "general or wasting palsy" (a progressive muscle degeneration and weakness, eventually leading to death), first diagnosed fifteen months earlier.

== Books ==
Reddie's works include The Amatory Experiences of a Surgeon (1881), The Sins of the Cities of the Plain (1881, with Simeon Solomon) and The Mysteries of Verbena House (1882, with George Augustus Sala).
