= Dublin Castle scandal =

1884 political scandal in Dublin

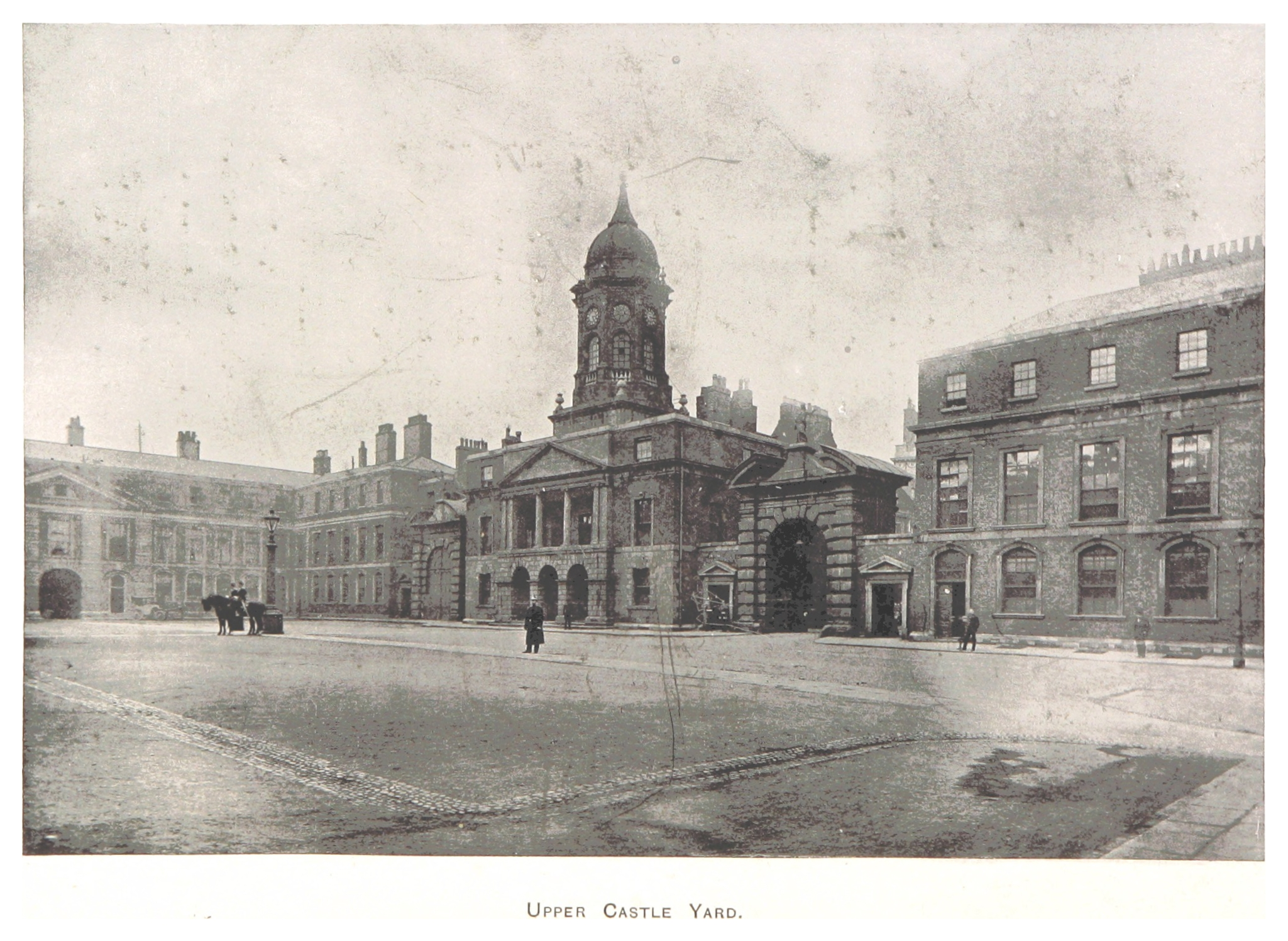
Dublin Castle in the 1880s

The Dublin Castle scandal was a controversy involving the administration of British rule in Ireland in 1884. Irish nationalists, including William O'Brien (via United Ireland), alleged homosexual orgies among the staff at Dublin Castle, the seat of the British government's administration in Ireland until 1922. Following a failed libel action, several members of the administration were convicted of participating in male homosexual acts.

== Allegations and libel action ==
In 1884, William O'Brien accused Gustavus (George) C. Cornwall, head of the General Post Office (GPO) in Ireland, of being a homosexual. In a subsequent five-day libel action, witnesses detailed Cornwall's homosexual relationships with soldiers, in areas including the Botanical Gardens, and his "duchess" nickname. O'Brien won the case, triggering both celebration amongst Irish Nationalists in Dublin and across the country, and a crackdown on homosexual activity by the Royal Irish Constabulary.

== Criminal cases ==
Amongst those charged with conspiracy to commit gross indecency was Martin Oranmore Kirwan (1847–1904), a captain in the Royal Irish Fusiliers who was the son of a County Galway Anglo-Irish landlord, following testimony from prostitute John Saul. Kirwan, nicknamed "Lizzie" amongst the men involved, was acquitted on the grounds that the Crown did not produce sufficient evidence, but resigned his commission. Cornwall, who had fled to family in Scotland following his leave of absence from the GPO, was acquitted of buggery charges, but was relieved of his position.

Grocery and wine merchant James Pillar, known as 'Pa' or 'Papa', pleaded guilty to buggery, and was sentenced to 20 years' imprisonment, the judge noting that Pillar was named in the trials of all the other men. He was released on licence on grounds of ill health in 1894.

== Legacy ==
The scandal unearthed a thriving gay subculture in the city.

Southern Illinois University Carbondale's Kevin Dettmar has stated that the scandal "paved the way" for the Labouchere Amendment, which made "gross indecency" a crime in the United Kingdom of Great Britain and Ireland.

In 2020, a Dublin Castle exhibition, "Splendour & Scandal: The Office of Arms at Dublin Castle", included references to the scandal. In September 2021 a sculpture, "RGB Sconce, Hold Your Nose", which was partly inspired by the scandal was temporarily erected outside City Hall. Talks on the scandal have been hosted by Heritage Ireland at the Castle.
