= Wolfram Setz =

German historian, editor and translator (1941–2023)

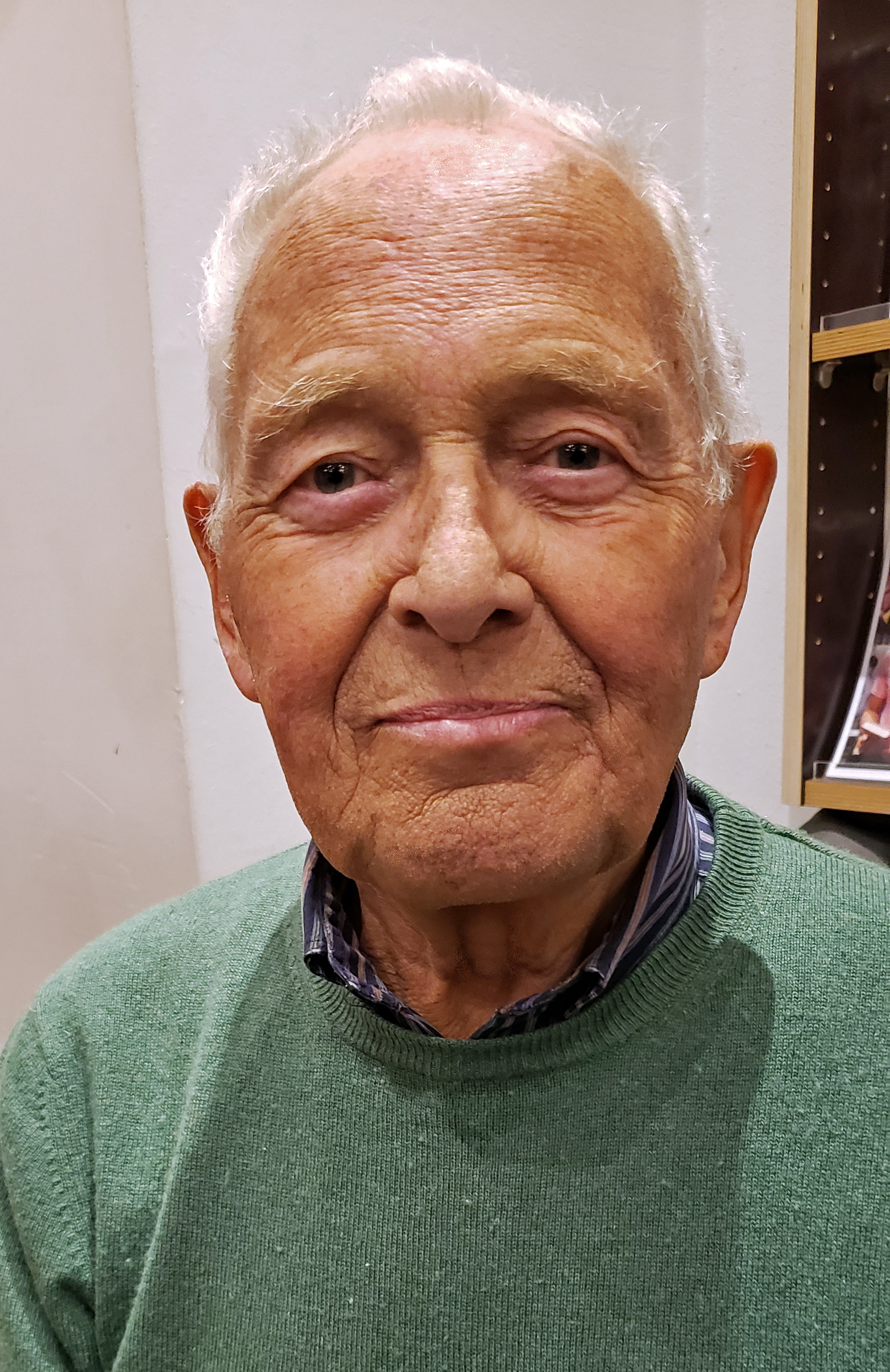
- Setz in 2022
- Born: 7 July 1941; Stralsund, Germany
- Died: 14 August 2023 (aged 82); Hamburg, Germany
- Education: University of Cologne; University of Tübingen (PhD)
- Occupations: Historian, editor

Wolfram Setz (7 July 1941 – 14 August 2023) was a German historian, editor, translator, and essayist.

== Life and career ==
Born in Stralsund, Setz studied at the University of Cologne and the University of Tübingen, completing his Ph.D. in 1975 with a dissertation on Lorenzo Valla's exposure of the Donation of Constantine as a hoax. Setz was subsequently employed as an editor at Monumenta Germaniae Historica in Munich. Following retirement in 2004, he relocated to Hamburg.

Setz was editor of the Bibliothek rosa Winkel, a series of 80 volumes of gay literary reprints, cultural studies, and historical works that was launched in 1991, published initially by Verlag rosa Winkel and after 2001 by Männerschwarm Verlag. Several of Setz's publications contributed to the rediscovery of the LGBT rights pioneer Karl Heinrich Ulrichs (1825–1895).

Setz was editor of the book series Homosexualität und Literatur published by Verlag rosa Winkel (12 volumes, 1981–1999) and a co-editor of the scholarly journal Forum Homosexualität und Literatur (1987–2007). In 1986 he was a founding member of the German LGBT organization Bundesverband Homosexualität and served for several years as a board member until the organization was dissolved in 1997.

In 2021 Deutschlandfunk broadcast an interview with the editor.

Wolfram Setz died in Hamburg on 14 August 2023 after a long illness, at the age of 82.

== Publications ==
=== In German ===
Setz's works were published by Verlag rosa winkel in Berlin, from 2001 Männerschwarm in Hamburg, from 2019 in Berlin.

- Lorenzo Vallas Schrift gegen die Konstantinische Schenkung. Zur Interpretation und Wirkungsgeschichte. Tübingen: Niemeyer, 1975.
- Ed. Erich Bethe: Die dorische Knabenliebe. Ihre Ethik und ihre Idee. Berlin: Rosa Winkel, 1983.
- Ed. Paul Verlaine: Männer. Hombres. Nachdruck der Ausgabe von 1920. Rosa Winkel, 1986.
- Ed. Das Hohelied der Knabenliebe. Erotische Gedichte aus der Griechischen Anthologie. Rosa Winkel, 1987.
- Ed. Der Roman eines Konträrsexuellen. Eine Autobiographie. Rosa Winkel, 1991.
- Ed. Die Sünde von Sodom. Erinnerungen eines viktorianischen Strichers. Rosa Winkel, 1995; Hamburg: MännerschwarmSkript, 2005.
- Ed. Thijs Maasen: Pädagogischer Eros. Gustav Wyneken und die Freie Schulgemeinde Wickersdorf. Rosa Winkel, 1995.
- Ed. Xavier Mayne (Edward Irenaeus Prime-Stevenson): Imre. Eine psychologische Romanze. Rosa Winkel, 1997.
- Ed. Karl Heinrich Ulrichs: Matrosengeschichten und Gedichte. Ein Lesebuch. Rosa Winkel, 1998.
- Transl. Hubert Kennedy: Der Kreis. Eine Zeitschrift und ihr Programm. Rosa Winkel, 1999.
- Ed. Karl Heinrich Ulrichs zu Ehren. Materialien zu Leben und Werk. Rosa Winkel, 2000.
- Ed. Die Geschichte der Homosexualitäten und die schwule Identität an der Jahrtausendwende. Eine Vortragsreihe aus Anlaß des 175. Geburtstags von Karl Heinrich Ulrichs. Rosa Winkel, 2000.
- Karl Heinrich Ulrichs zum 175. Geburtstag. Ein (Ge)Denkblatt. Munich: Forum Homosexualität und Geschichte, 2000.
- Ed. and afterword. Robert Sherard: Oscar Wilde. Die Geschichte einer unglücklichen Freundschaft. Berlin: Rosa Winkel, 2000.
- Coed., with Günter Grau. Schwulsein 2000. Perspektiven im vereinigten Deutschland. Edition Waldschlösschen. Hamburg: MännerschwarmSkript, 2001.
- Ed. Antonio Rocco: Der Schüler Alkibiades. Ein philosophisch-erotischer Dialog. Hamburg 2002.
- Ed. Neue Funde und Studien zu Karl Heinrich Ulrichs. Hamburg 2004.
- Ed. Jacques d'Adelswärd-Fersen. Dandy und Poet. Annäherungen. Hamburg 2005.
- Ed. Homosexualität in der DDR. Materialien und Meinungen. Hamburg 2006.
- Ed. and afterword. Howard Sturgis: Tim. Roman. Hamburg 2009.
- Ed. and afterword. Binet-Valmer: Lucien. Hamburg 2009.
- Ed. and afterword. Adolf Wilbrandt: Fridolins heimliche Ehe. Hamburg 2010.
- Ed. and cotransl. Jacques d'Adelswärd-Fersen: Lord Lyllian. Hamburg 2010.
- Ed. Fritz Geron Pernauhm (i.e., Guido Hermann Eckardt): Die Infamen. Hamburg 2010.
- Ed. Peter Hamecher: Zwischen den Geschlechtern. Literaturkritik. Gedichte. Prosa. Hamburg 2011.
- Ed. Jules Siber: Seelenwanderung. Hamburg 2011.
- Coed., with Albert Knoll. Homunkulus: Zwischen den Geschlechtern. Roman einer geächteten Leidenschaft. Hamburg 2012.
- Ed. Herman Bang: Michael. Hamburg 2012.
- Ed. Emil Mario Vacano and Günther von Freiberg: König Phantasus. Roman eines Unglücklichen. Hamburg 2014.
- Emil Mario Vacano. Eine biographische Skizze. Mit einem Textanhang. Hamburg 2014.
- Oscar Wilde & Co. Historisch-literarische Spurensicherungen. Hamburg 2016.
- Ed. Lukian: Erotes. Ein Gespräch über die Liebe. Trans. Hans Licht (i.e., Paul Brandt). Hamburg 2017.
- Ed. and afterword. Luigi Settembrini: Die Neuplatoniker. Ein erotisches Märchen. Trans. Gerd Gauglitz. Hamburg 2017.
- Ed. and afterword. Karl Heinrich Ulrichs: Auf Bienchens Flügeln. Ein Flug um den Erdball in Epigrammen und poetischen Bildern. Nach dem Handexemplar des Autors. Hamburg 2017.
- Afterword. Alec Scouffi: Hotel zum Goldfisch. Trans. Karl Blanck and Helene Schauer. Berlin: Männerschwarm, 2019.
- Afterword. Pierre Loti: Mein Bruder Yves. Trans. Robert Prölss. Berlin 2020.
- Ed. and foreword. Edel-Uranier erzählen. Hans Waldau: Aus der Freundschaft sonnigsten Tagen. Der Liebling Kurt. Konradin: Ein Jünger Platos. Aus dem Leben eines Entgleisen. Theo von Tempesta: Aus dem Liebesleben zweier Freunde. Berlin 2021.

=== In English ===
- Ed. and introduction (pp. vii-xxv). The Sins of the Cities of the Plain. Kansas City: Valancourt, 2013.
