= Male prostitution in Bangladesh =

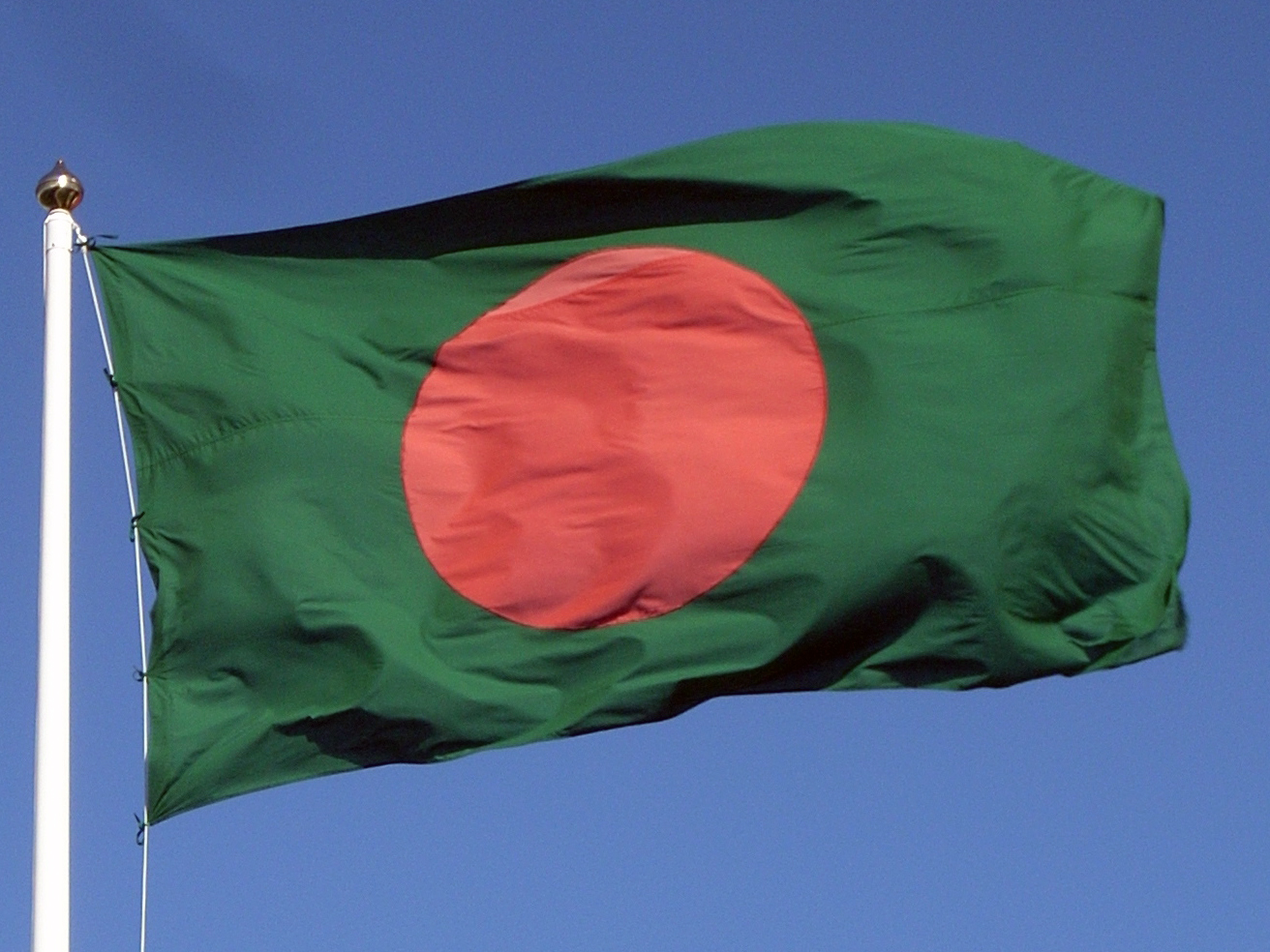
Flag of Bangladesh

Male prostitution in Bangladesh is not recognised in any official capacity within the country’s laws and the Penal Code. Despite this, many Bangladeshi men participate in prostitution, with male sex workers having male clients but typically being married to women because of role expectations. Since Bangladesh is a majority Muslim and socially conservative country, homosexuality is generally discouraged and regarded as taboo. These negative attitudes towards homosexuality often force male sex workers to be extremely covert. Stigma surrounding male sex work and homosexuality also means that boys who are sex trafficked in Bangladesh are hard to identify and protect under Bangladeshi laws, male sex work is limited to less policed venues (such as the internet), and health outreach to the male sex worker population is extremely difficult.

== Laws and Penal Code ==
Selling sex in a private setting is legal in Bangladesh. Buying sex is also legal. However, buying sex and soliciting in public is illegal.

Penal Code sections relevant to sex work:

- Section 366A — Procuring a minor girl (under the age of eighteen) to go from any place or to do any act in which that girl may be forced or seduced to illicit intercourse with another person is punishable with imprisonment (max ten years) and liable to a fine.
- Section 373 — Obtaining possession of any person under the age of eighteen with the intent of using such person for the purpose of prostitution or illicit intercourse is punishable with imprisonment (max ten years) and liable to a fine.
  - Explanation I: Any prostitute or any person keeping or managing a brothel, who obtains possession of a female under the age of eighteen years shall be presumed to have obtained possession of such female with the intent to use her for prostitution.

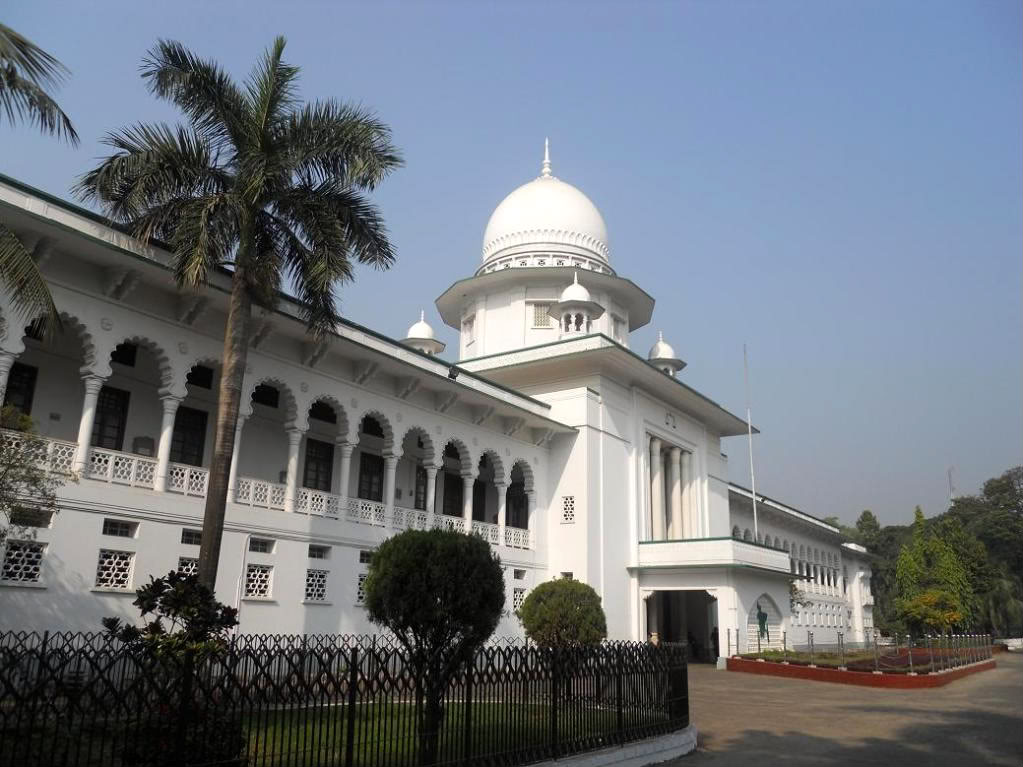
Supreme Court of Bangladesh

Many of the protective laws regarding sex trafficking and sex work use gendered language, specifically mentioning females/girls and not males or nonbinary individuals. While more inclusive language exists in legislation such as The Prevention and Suppression of Human Trafficking Act (2012) the legal implications for male sex workers and/or male sex trafficking victims within these protective laws are still unclear.

- Section 377 — Whoever voluntarily has carnal intercourse against the order of nature with any man, woman or animal, shall be punished with imprisonment for life, or with imprisonment of max ten years, and shall also be liable to a fine.

The scope of Section 377 includes any kind of penetration. This means that all homosexual acts are punishable by up to life imprisonment. The same goes for heterosexual acts not relevant to natural reproduction, such as anal penetration and fellatio.

While homosexual acts are criminal in Bangladesh, there is a certain level of tolerance for non-heterosexual relationships as long as they remain private. Bangladeshi men and women are expected to maintain heteronormative relationships in public.

== Terminology ==
A good portion of Bangladeshi male sex workers consider themselves kothis. The term kothi refers to a feminised man who enjoy sex as if he were a woman. Kothis predominate the male commercial sex industry in Bangladesh, while a majority of commercial sex clients are considered pantis. A panti is a term used for gender conforming men who prefer penetrating other men during sex (typically kothis). The term giraya is also used for male sex workers, but focuses on men who behave and appear traditionally masculine, as opposed to more feminine kothis.

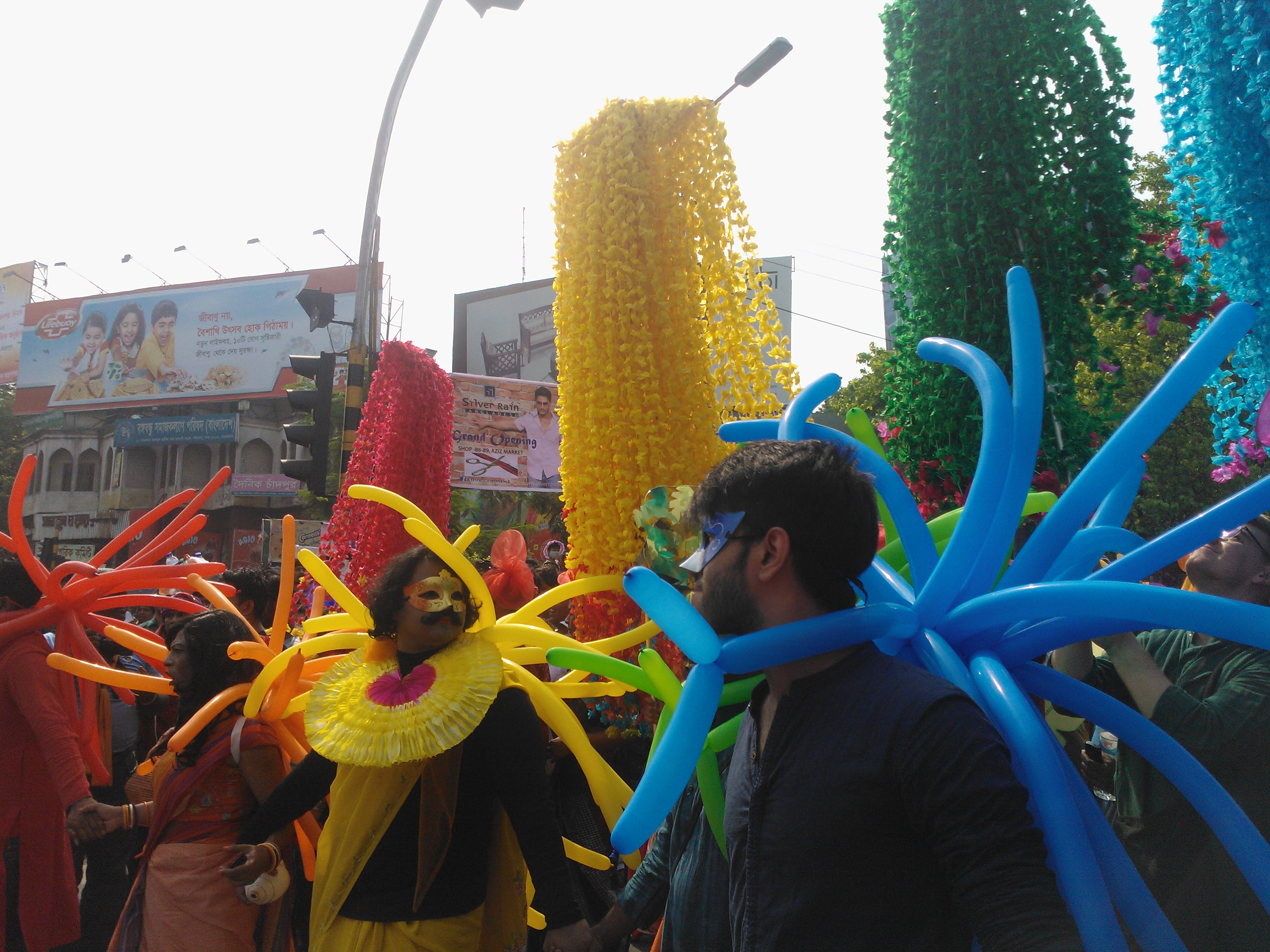
LGBT rights rally in Dhaka, Bangladesh

The use of English terminology such as “gay” and “homosexual” is uncommon in Bangladesh.

== Popular attitudes about male sex work ==
Traditionally masculine roles are strongly emphasised in Bangladeshi culture. This includes heterosexual relationships, meaning that most men end up marrying women, regardless of their sexual orientation. Because homosexuality is considered immoral and illegal, many male sex workers who have sex with men (commonly referred to as “MSMs” in research) tend to keep female wives and sexual partners in order to maintain the status quo.

This emphasis on marriage unions between men and women stems from Bangladesh’s Islamic culture. In Islam, marriage is considered the only legitimate way to achieve sexual satisfaction, especially for the purposes of starting a family. Sexual relations outside of a marriage and/or with the opposite sex are considered serious sins. Kothis tend to have the hardest time conforming to Bangladesh’s culture of heterosexual marriage, as they are the most socially and sexually divergent from heterosexual men.

The intense stigma around homosexuality in Bangladesh often leads to violence and abuse against male sex workers. Many male sex workers report instances of gender-based violence (harassment, blackmail, mistreatment by police), physical violence (beating, torture), sexual violence (rape, refusal to wear a condom), and verbal abuse (name-calling, verbal insults).

Many Bangladeshi male sex workers cite social marginalisation as the reason they cannot secure jobs outside of sex work. Because many of these workers identify as homosexual and/or have more feminine personalities, they do not fit into the typical male archetype and are often turned away by employers. This reinforces their alienated status within Bangladeshi society.

There is not much research on male sex workers who entertain female clients.

== Links to child sex trafficking ==
It is not uncommon for underage boys to be sex trafficked within Bangladesh. Male children are usually trafficked within the country or sold outside of the country. Within Bangladesh, many young boys start selling sex after being sexually assaulted. Because of the country’s gender norms, boys can have trouble understanding and communicating experiences of sexual assault (either due to lack of knowledge or embarrassment). After having sex at a young age, boys of usually low socioeconomic standing begin to exchange sex for money. Boys trafficked outside of Bangladesh are typically sent to the U.A.E. or Qatar to work as camel jockeys, where it is not uncommon for them to be sexually exploited by older men. Bangladeshi boys are also trafficked to nearby countries like India and Pakistan.

Heteronormative regulation surrounding sex trafficking tends to exclude boys. This might be due to the fact that, in Bangladesh, males are seen as perpetrators of sexual coercion and trafficking, not victims.

== Using the internet ==
Boys of Bangladesh is a popular online forum for gay men

Because men are typically not welcomed into brothels or more visible places for sex work, the internet has become a popular venue for male sex work. This is especially true for young, gay men seeking financial rewards from older men. As the use of cyberspace continues to increase in Bangladesh, it has become clear how closely the country’s economy is intertwined with sexuality. Because unemployment is high among young, homosexual men, many of them turn to online forums to exchange sex for money and other resources.

These online forums allow for safer sex work practices. Male buyers and sellers are able to control where and when they meet, and this allows for trust to be established before taking the relationship further.

== Health concerns ==
Male sex workers often face social, legal, and economic barriers that prevent them from receiving medical care and learning safe sex practices. Many Bangladeshi male sex workers are unable to seek information about sexually transmitted diseases, such as HIV or syphilis. As homosexuality is a criminal offense in Bangladesh, health outreach programs face similar obstacles when trying to educate male sex workers about the importance of safe sex. Condom use among Bangladeshi male sex workers is very low. As a result, male sex workers remain at high risk for contracting sexually transmitted diseases, particularly syphilis. HIV has a low prevalence among male sex workers, but the low frequency of condom use leaves high potential for a future HIV epidemic.

Another major health concern is drug use. Methamphetamine is commonly taken (termed Yaba by Bangladeshi male sex workers). The majority of male sex workers take Yaba to help increase revenue: Yaba allows them to see more clients by lessening pain during anal sex, helping them stay awake for longer periods of time, and ultimately curbing some of the psychological and emotional pressure that comes with being a sex worker. Male sex workers take Yaba to alleviate both the physical and mental pains they endure, making their work life smoother and more profitable.
