= Edward Avery =

British publisher

Edward Avery (1851 – 1913) was an English publisher of pornography. His notable publications include The Whippingham Papers, including poems by Algernon Charles Swinburne, and a pirated edition of Sir Richard Burton's Kama Sutra. He was an associate of William Lazenby and Leonard Smithers.

After the Post Office (Protection) Act 1884, Avery together with other publishers such as Charles Carrington, William Lazenby and Harry Sidney Nichols moved much of their business to Paris to sell in the United Kingdom by mail order.

After evading prosecution successfully for many years he was finally arrested by Chief Inspector Edward Drew and convicted in 1900. His stock was destroyed and he retired from business.
