= William Dugdale (publisher) =

English publisher, printer, and bookseller

William Dugdale (29 March 1800–11 November 1868) was an English publisher, printer, and bookseller of politically subversive publications and pornographic literature in England during the 19th century. By the 1850s he had become "the principal source of such publications in the country." Despite the numerous police raids on his shops and spending many years in prison, he remained in the book trade for over forty years.

== Family ==
William Dugdale was the first son born to Quaker John Dugdale, son of John and Jennet Dugdale (also Quakers), and Ann Platt, daughter of William and Elizabeth Platt. John the elder worked as a linen draper; John the younger was a Stockport hosier and tailor. William's mother, Ann, was born on 16 February 1772 in Chester. Her father was a clock and watch-maker in Manchester. She died at the age of 38 on 2 January 1810.

John and Ann married on 29 June 1797. They had six children, all born in Stockport. Three of the children: Jennet, Samuel and Jabez died before reaching the age of 5; they, plus their mother, died within three years of each other of unknown causes.

== Education ==
William, Thomas and John Lambert, once they reached the age of 9, were educated at Ackworth School, a boarding school for Quaker boys and girls. William attended from 1809 to 1813, Thomas from 1812 to 1816, and John from 1814 to 1817.

== Marriage ==
On 4 May 1826, William married Hannah Pinnell in the parish of St. Anne, Soho, Westminster. Hannah, the daughter of Robert Pinnell and Fanny Warren, was baptized on 23 May 1803 in Warminster. Hannah died August 1855, buried 14 August 1855 at Nunhead Cemetery in London. William and Hannah had 4 children:

- William John Dugdale – born abt. 1824, baptized 4 September 1827. In the 1851 England census, William's occupation is listed as bookseller at 35 Holywell-street.
  - Married Jane Samuels on 8 November 1846 in Deptford.
    - William Ambrose Dugdale. He was baptized 18 March 1849.
- Frances Dugdale – born 24 June 1827 in St. Martin-in-the Fields parish. Died in 1881.
  - Married John Higdon Thornhill, a tailor, on 26 October 1845 in St. Martin-in-the Fields parish. He and Frances also ran Dugdale's shop at 5 Holywell-street, while Frances' father was in prison for selling obscene prints. In 1858, John and Thomas Blacketer (husband of Ann, Thomas Dugdale's daughter) were convicted of selling obscene prints from the same address. They were sentenced to 6 months hard labor.
    - Fanny M. was born abt. 1847 in Deptford, England.
    - John H. was born abt. 1848 in Deptford, England.
    - Joan was born abt. 1848 in Deptford, England.
    - Nellie Grace was born abt. 1868 in London, England.
- Jessie Dugdale - born the 1st quarter of 1844. Died in April 1880.
  - Married Theophilus Sebastian Judge in the 4th quarter of 1865 in St. Giles in the Fields parish. Theo was born the 1st quarter of 1840 in Windsor, Berkshire, Surrey, England. Theo, as well as his father, Jasper Judge, and many of his brothers were booksellers involved in the obscene book trade. Theophilus used many aliases during his career as a bookseller including Thomas Judge and C. Brown. He operated out of an address on Holywell-street and Dugdale's shop at 44 Wych-street, which he continued running after Dugdale's death. He was indicted for selling obscene prints and books from that address on 13 April 1869 and sentenced to 2 years in prison. Theo died in 1926 at the age of 86 in Chelsea, London, England.
- Elizabeth Jane Dugdale – baptized 17 January 1847.

== Occupation ==
At the age of 18 Dugdale moved to London where he was employed by William Benbow, a radical publisher of obscene books. Two years later he was implicated (though not prosecuted) in the Cato Street Conspiracy. In 1822 he started his own publishing and book-selling business, initially of a general nature but specializing later in pornography. Ashbee described him as "one of the most prolific publishers of filthy books." Although Dugdale published some original works many were translations done by James Campbell Reddie and reprints of previously published erotica. Eventually, William's two brothers, Thomas and John, as well as William's son, became booksellers and joined the family trade.

=== Addresses & aliases ===
William Dugdale set up shop at numerous addresses during his 40+ years in the book trade. He started out at 19 Tower Street, Seven-Dials in 1822. He then moved to 23 Russell Ct. in 1824, 30 Russell Ct. in 1830, 94 Drury Lane in 1837 and briefly at 3 Wych Street. before he settled down at 37 Holywell St. He remained at that address from 1839 until the late 1860s; although a couple of printer notices list addresses of 11 Holywell St. in 1842 and 5 Holywell St. in 1857. during that time frame. His last known bookstore was located at 44 Wych St., 1868.

His brother, Thomas, worked out of 51 Holywell St. from 1847 through at least 1855. From about 1851 through about 1855, brother John was selling books from 50 Holywell St. and William's son, William John, was doing business at 35 Holywell St.

The Dugdales used a variety of publisher and printer aliases on their clandestine publications (H. Smith, D. Brown, J. Turner, W. Johns, etc.). If this was done in the hope that it would keep the Society for the Suppression of Vice from knocking on their doors they were sorely mistaken.

=== Obscenity & the courts ===
William was incarcerated numerous times on obscenity charges. He was one of the main targets of the Obscene Publications Act 1857, being one of the first people arrested under the act. His first known run-in with the law concerning the sale of an obscene book occurred in May 1830. Subsequent arrests for publishing obscenity occurred in 1845, 1851 (2 years), 1861 (2 years), and 1868. The latter landed him 18 months in the Clerkenwell prison, where he died a few months after incarceration.

William's two brothers were no strangers to the Society for the Suppression of Vice and to the English courts. Thomas was found guilty of selling and publishing obscene prints from 51 Holywell Street on 16 August 1847 and sentenced to 1 year in prison. John Lambert was indicted twice for selling obscene prints: in 1847 and 1856.

== Death ==
William Dugdale died at the age of 68 on 11 November 1868 while incarcerated at the Clerkenwell house of correction. An article posted in Lloyd's Weekly Newspaper regarding an inquiry into the circumstances of his death reads in part: "Jessie Judge of 44 Wych-street…said she was the daughter of the deceased. She had seen him several times since he had been in prison. He had been very ill and was not ill when he entered the gaol…He was deprived of books and pen and paper and that I think affected his mind…it appeared that although sentenced to hard labour he did not do any; and had been in the convalescent ward, and on a first-class diet from the first." Cause of death was ruled as "death from natural causes". The jury also strongly recommended that books of a higher intellectual character than those generally distributed throughout the ward should be made available to the "high class of men who were prisoners". Dugdale was buried at Nunhead Cemetery in London on 17 November 1868.
