= Harry Sidney Nichols =

English publisher of erotica (1865–1941)

Harry Sidney Nichols (14 August 1865 – 30 November 1941) was an English publisher of erotica.

Nichols was born in Wortley, Leeds, Yorkshire, the son of glass merchant William Nichols and his wife, Mary Hartley Nichols. He went into business as antiquarian book dealer, but he made his fortune as a Sheffield publisher and printer of high-end erotica in partnership with Leonard Smithers which included such works as Sir Richard Francis Burton's translation of the Book of One Thousand and One Nights. In 1888 they formed the Erotika Biblion Society, for which Smithers acted as printer. Under threat of arrest under strict Victorian pornography laws, Nichols went into exile in Paris from 1900 to 1908, publishing by mail-order to England.

In 1908, Nichols, being threatened with extradition to England, migrated to Stamford, Connecticut, New York City. His mistress, Annie (renamed 'Dolly'), pregnant with twin daughters, Aimee and Marcia, followed him shortly. Nichols continued to publish erotica until 1939, when he was committed to Bellevue Mental Hospital, where he died in 1941.
