= Leonard Smithers =

English publisher and pornographer (1861–1907)

Leonard Charles Smithers (19 December 1861 – 19 December 1907) was a London bookseller and publisher associated with the Decadent movement of the late 19th century.

== Biography ==
Born in Sheffield, England, Smithers worked as a solicitor after qualifying in 1884 and became friendly with the explorer and orientalist Sir Richard Francis Burton (1821–1890). He was an original subscriber to Burton's translation of the Book of One Thousand and One Nights in 1885 and published (after Burton's death) a somewhat bowdlerized edition of it. He also collaborated with Burton in a translation from the Latin of the Carmina of Caius Valerius Catullus and Priapeia, a collection of erotic poems by various writers. He also published a limited edition of the Satyricon of Petronius Arbiter.

Smithers published works by Aubrey Beardsley, Max Beerbohm, Aleister Crowley, Ernest Dowson, Arthur Symons and Oscar Wilde and lesser known figures such as Vincent O'Sullivan and Nigel Tourneur. With Symons and Beardsley, he founded The Savoy, a periodical that ran to eight issues in 1896. In partnership with Harry Sidney Nichols, he published a series of pornographic books under the imprint of the "Erotika Biblion Society": He was notorious for posting a slogan at his bookshop in Bond Street reading "Smut is cheap today". One of his hobbies was "deflowering little girls", about which Oscar Wilde said, "He loves first editions."

When Beardsley converted to Roman Catholicism, he asked Smithers to "destroy all copies of Lysistrata and bad drawings...by all that is holy all obscene drawings." Smithers ignored Beardsley's wishes and continued to sell reproductions as well as forgeries of Beardsley's work.

After the trials of Oscar Wilde in 1895, Smithers was one of the few publishers prepared to continue to handle "decadent" literature, such as Wilde's The Ballad of Reading Gaol in 1898, and The Savoy.

Smithers went bankrupt in 1900, and died in 1907 from cirrhosis of the liver. His body was found in a house in Parson's Green on his 46th birthday, surrounded by empty bottles of Dr J. Collis Browne's Chlorodyne. He was buried in an unmarked grave, paid for by Lord Alfred Douglas, in a cemetery in Fulham Palace Road.

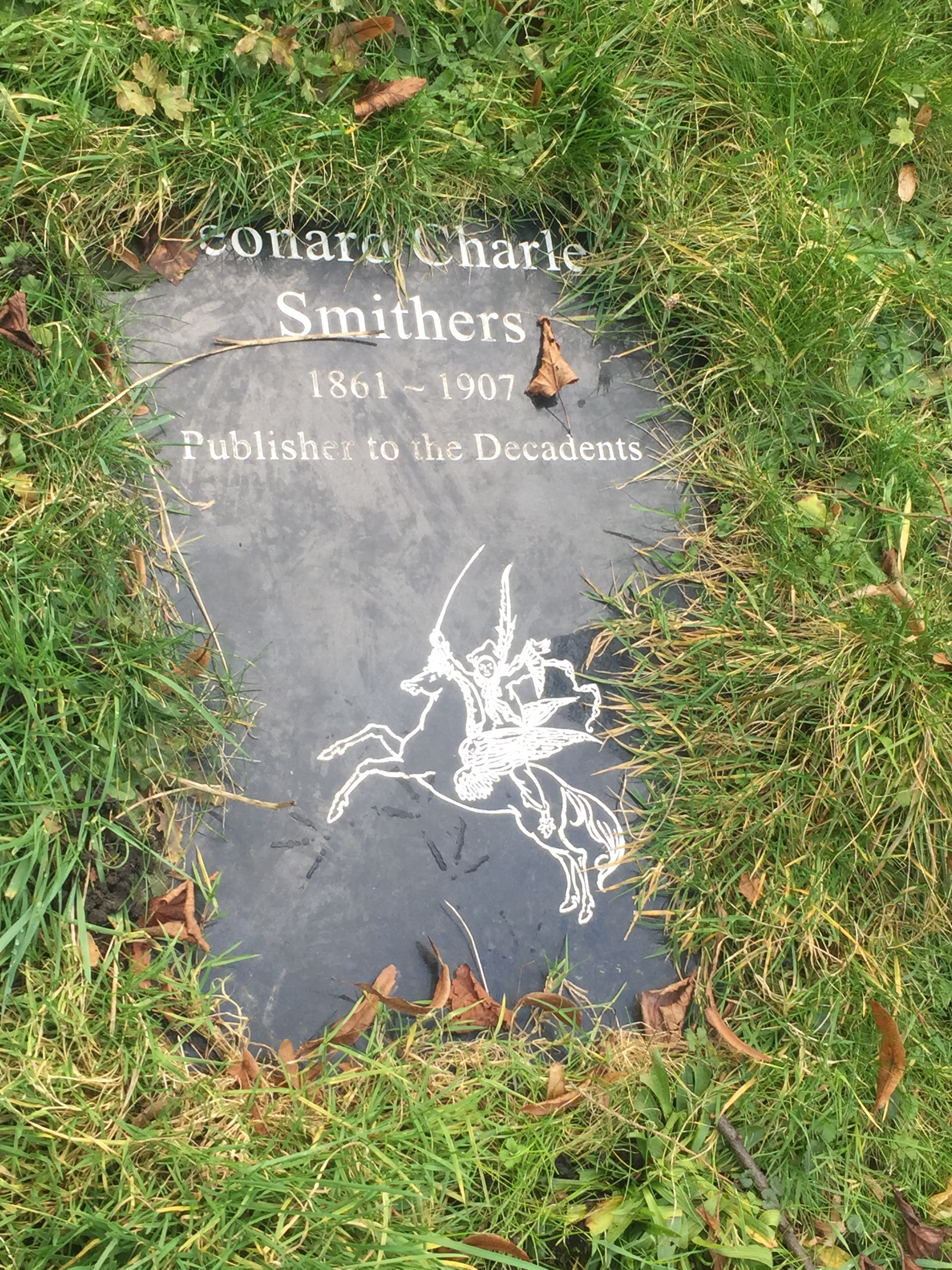
Plaque, possibly gravestone, for Leonard Charles Smithers, Fulham Palace Cemetery.

== Translations ==
- Leonard C. Smithers and Sir Richard Burton. Priapeia sive diversorum poetarum in Priapum lusus or Sportive Epigrams on Priapus by divers poets in English verse and prose. 1890 .

== Sources ==
- James G. Nelson, Publisher to the Decadents: Leonard Smithers in the Careers of Beardsley, Wilde, Dowson. Rivendale Press, May 2000. ISBN 0-953503-38-0
- John Sutherland, The Stanford Companion to Victorian Fiction, Stanford University Press, 1990, ISBN 0-8047-1842-3, p. 591.
- Bruce S. Harris (ed.), "The Collected Drawings of Aubrey Beardsley", Crown Publishers, 1967, p.v
- Rachel Potter, "Obscene Modernism and the Trade in Salacious Books", Modernism/modernity, Volume 16, Number 1, January 2009, pp. 87–104 doi:10.1353/mod.0.0065
- Matthew Sweet, Inventing the Victorians, Faber and Faber, 2001, ISBN 978-0-571-20663-6
