= Pluck and Luck =

American dime novel

Pluck and Luck: Complete Stories of Adventure was an American dime novel first published by Frank Tousey and was the longest-running dime novel. It numbered 1605 issues from January 12, 1898 to March 5, 1929. The 32-page magazine was semi-monthly for the first 22 issues and then weekly. Its size was 8 x 11 inches (through No. 1144) and 6 x 9 inches thereafter, and it featured color covers. Issues 1002 to 1464 were published by Harry Wolff and the rest by Westbury.

It primarily featured stories of adventure covering subjects including fire fighters, railroads, American Revolution, the American Civil War, frontier, finance and success, temperance, circus, science fiction, and travel and exploration. The principal series character was Jack Wright.

All the stories were reprints from Tousey story papers Boys of New York, Golden Weekly, Happy Days, and Young Men of America.

Authors included Cecil Burleigh, Augustus Comstock, Francis W. Doughty, Thomas W. Hanshew, Walter Fenton Mott, Dennis O'Sullivan, Luis Senarens, Harvey K. Shackleford, Cornelius Shea, George G. Small, William Howard Van Orden and others writing under house names.
