= Dederick =

Dederick is a surname. Notable people with the surname include:

- Ella Dederick (born 1996), American soccer player
- Hannah Dederick (born 2002), American Paralympic athlete
- Robert Dederick (1919-1983), South African poet
- Zadoc Dederick, American inventor

== See also ==
- Dederick, Missouri, an unincorporated community in Vernon County, Missouri, US
