= List of The League of Extraordinary Gentlemen titles =

The League of Extraordinary Gentlemen is a comic book series written by Alan Moore and illustrated by Kevin O'Neill, publication of which began in 1999. The series spans several volumes.

== Volumes ==
=== The League of Extraordinary Gentlemen, Volume I (1999–2000) ===
In the aftermath of the events of the novel Dracula, a now disgraced and divorced Mina Harker (née Murray) is recruited by Campion Bond on behalf of British Intelligence chief "M" and asked to assemble a league of other extraordinary individuals to protect the interests of the Empire. Together with Captain Nemo, Mina travels to Cairo to locate Allan Quatermain, then in Paris in search of Dr. Jekyll, and in London recruits Hawley Griffin, The Invisible Man. Meeting with Professor Cavor, the League is sent against Fu Manchu in his Limehouse lair, who has stolen the only known sample of cavorite and plans to use it to build an armed airship, against which Britain would have little defence. Having eventually retrieved the cavorite, the League delivers it into the hands of their employer, who is revealed to be Professor Moriarty (nemesis of Sherlock Holmes), who plans to use it in an airship of his own, with which he will bomb his adversary's Limehouse lair flat, taking large parts of London and the League itself with it. An aerial battle above London commences, and the League eventually triumphs. Mycroft Holmes replaces Moriarty as the League's employer, and the extraordinary individuals are given the task of remaining in the service of the Crown, awaiting England's call. Some kind of a meteor shower is shown, leading up to the events in Volume II.

=== The League of Extraordinary Gentlemen, Volume II (2002–2003) ===
Placed during the events of H. G. Wells's The War of the Worlds, Volume II opens on Mars, where John Carter and Lt. Gullivar Jones (of Edwin Lester Arnold's Gullivar of Mars) have assembled an alliance to fight against Martian invaders. When the invaders are forced to leave Mars and land on Earth, they begin to build their tripods. Griffin leaves the League under cover of invisibility to form an alliance with the invaders before betraying it outright, stealing plans for the defence of London as well as physically and emotionally assaulting Mina.

Mycroft Holmes deploys Nemo and Hyde to defend the capital by patrolling London's rivers in the Nautilus. Meanwhile, Murray and Quatermain meet up with Dr. Moreau in his secret hideout in the forest, and tell him that MI5 has asked for something known as H-142. Hyde returns to the British Museum and tortures Griffin, breaking Griffin's leg and raping him before murdering him. Hyde dies while fighting a tripod, allowing time for MI5 to launch H-142, but before he goes to fight the tripods, he asks Mina for two things: for her to give him a kiss, and permission to touch her breast.

MI5 then launches H-142: a hybrid bacterium, made up of anthrax and streptococcus. Nemo is infuriated, and Bond coolly replies that they will claim that, officially, the Martians died of the common cold, whilst any humans found dead will have been killed by Martians. Angered by the British government's heartless use of biological weaponry, Nemo leaves in the Nautilus and tells Quatermain and Murray to "never seek [him] again", mistakenly believing that they knew the details of the British plan.

=== The League of Extraordinary Gentlemen: Black Dossier (2007) ===
Presented as a stand-alone sourcebook, rather than as the third volume, the Black Dossier has a framing sequence set not in the Victorian era but in 1958. Events take place after the fall of the Big Brother government from Nineteen Eighty-Four (the in-story explanation for this apparent date-shift is that Orwell's book was published in 1948). The story itself sees Mina Harker and Allan Quatermain—now immortal after bathing in the fire of youth from She—on their quest to recover the Black Dossier itself (a confessed MacGuffin), in a metafictional unravelling of the secret history of the now-disbanded League of Extraordinary Gentlemen.

Out to stop them is a trio of secret agents: James Bond, Emma Night, and Hugo "Bulldog" Drummond. The pursuit takes Mina and Allan from London to Scotland and eventually to the magical Blazing World, overseen by Shakespeare's Prospero.

Initially intended to be accompanied by a 45-rpm record featuring songs referenced in the plot, this addition was shelved ostensibly to be included as an incentive with the 'Absolute Edition', and ultimately dropped entirely, to the chagrin of the author/singer. A limited number of copies of the record were eventually produced in the UK.

=== The League of Extraordinary Gentlemen, Volume III: Century (2009–2012) ===
The third volume, a 216-page epic spanning almost a hundred years and entitled Century, is divided into three 72-page chapters, each a self-contained narrative. The volumes were tentatively scheduled to be released annually with Part 1 released in May 2009; Part 2 not released until July 2011; and Part 3 being released in June 2012.

Chapter one is set against a backdrop of London, 1910, with Halley's Comet passing overhead, the nation prepares for the Coronation of George V, and far away on his South Atlantic island, the scientist-pirate Captain Nemo is dying. In the bowels of the British Museum, Carnacki the ghost-finder is plagued by visions of a shadowy occult order who are attempting to create something called a Moonchild, while on London's dockside the most notorious serial murderer of the previous century has returned to carry on his grisly trade. Chapter two takes place almost 60 years later in the psychedelic daze of Swinging London during 1969, a place where tadukic acid diethylamide 26 is the drug of choice (similar to LSD), and where different underworlds are starting to overlap dangerously to an accompaniment of sit-ins and sitars. Starting to buckle from the pressures of the twentieth century and the weight of their own endless lives, Mina and her companions must nevertheless prevent the making of a Moonchild that might well turn out to be the Antichrist. In chapter three, the narrative draws to its cataclysmic close in London 2009. The magical child whose ominous coming has been foretold for the past hundred years has now been born and has grown up to claim his dreadful heritage. His promised eon of unending terror can commence and the world can now be ended starting with North London.

=== The League of Extraordinary Gentlemen: Nemo Trilogy (2013–2015) ===
This spin-off from the main League of Extraordinary Gentlemen story consists of three chapters, published as standalone hardcover books: Nemo: Heart of Ice, Nemo: The Roses of Berlin, and Nemo: River of Ghosts.

Nemo: Heart of Ice follows Janni Dakkar to Antarctica in 1925. The story opens with Nemo and her crew robbing a great treasure from Ayesha, who appears to have great influence over Charles Foster Kane. Nemo travels to Antarctica as her father once did on a trip that drove him mad. Kane recruits Frank Reade Jr., Jack Wright, and Tom Swift to retrieve Ayesha's treasure from Nemo. The trio follow her to Antarctica where they encounter a pit that leads to Yuggoth, a mysterious white giant and an ice sphinx.

Nemo: The Roses of Berlin takes place in 1941 where Janni Dakkar and Broad Arrow Jack's daughter Hira and her husband Armand Robur are captured by Adenoid Hynkel's Nazi-forces. Nemo and Jack go to Berlin on a rescue mission only to find out they have been lured into a trap. They are soon pursued by the remains of the Twilight Heroes, Maria and Dr. Caligari. Dr. Mabuse later helps the pair evade capture and reveals to them that the plot had been orchestrated by Ayesha, who has become an ally of Hynkel, to get her vengeance after the events of "Heart of Ice".

Nemo: River of Ghosts takes place in the year of 1975 and is set in South America. Janni sets off down the vastness of the Amazon, from the ruined city of Yu-Atlanchi to the fabulous plateau of Maple White Land to settle scores with old enemies.

=== The League of Extraordinary Gentlemen, Volume IV: Tempest (2018–2019) ===
The fourth volume was released in six parts, starting in 2018. Not only has it been announced as the last League story, but also creators Alan Moore and Kevin O'Neill have described it as their final work in the comic book medium. The plot is described as follows: "Opening simultaneously in the panic-stricken headquarters of British Military Intelligence, the fabled Ayesha's lost African city of Kor and the domed citadel of 'We' on the devastated Earth of the year 2996, the dense and yet furiously-paced narrative hurtles like an express locomotive across the fictional globe from Lincoln Island to modern America to the Blazing World; from the Jacobean antiquity of Prospero's Men to the superhero-inundated pastures of the present to the unimaginable reaches of a shimmering science-fiction future. With a cast-list that includes many of the most iconic figures from literature and pop culture, and a tempo that conveys the terrible momentum of inevitable events, this is literally and literarily the story to end all stories".

== Collected editions ==
- The League of Extraordinary Gentlemen, Volume I, collects vol. 1 #1–6
  - Hardcover: ISBN 1-56389-665-6
  - Paperback: ISBN 1-56389-858-6
  - Absolute edition (deluxe hardcover): ISBN 1-4012-0052-4, including Moore's original scripts and additional artwork by O'Neill
- The League of Extraordinary Gentlemen, Volume II, collects vol. 2 #1–6
  - Hardcover: ISBN 1-4012-0117-2
  - Paperback: ISBN 1-4012-0118-0
  - Absolute edition (deluxe hardcover): ISBN 1-4012-0611-5, including Moore's original scripts and additional artwork by O'Neill
- The League of Extraordinary Gentlemen, The Black Dossier
  - Hardcover: ISBN 1-4012-0306-X (November 2007)
  - Paperback: ISBN 978-1-4012-0307-8
  - Absolute edition (deluxe hardcover): ISBN 1-4012-0751-0 (June 2008), with no additional bonus content
- The League of Extraordinary Gentlemen, Volume III
  - Century 1910 paperback: ISBN 978-1-60309-000-1 (May 2009)
  - Century 1969 paperback: ISBN 978-1-60309-006-3 (July 2011)
  - Century 2009 paperback: ISBN 978-1-60309-007-0 (June 2012)
  - The League of Extraordinary Gentlemen, Volume III: Century hardcover (collects 1910, 1969 and 2009) ISBN 978-0-86166-232-6 (July 2014)
  - The League of Extraordinary Gentlemen, Volume III: Century paperback (collects 1910, 1969 and 2009) ISBN 978-1-60309-437-5 (July 2018)
- Nemo: Heart of Ice (hardcover) ISBN 978-1603092746 (March 2013)
- Nemo: The Roses of Berlin (hardcover) ISBN 978-0861662302 (March 2014)
- Nemo: River of Ghosts (hardcover) ISBN 978-0861662333 (March 2015)
- The League of Extraordinary Gentlemen, Volume IV
  - The League of Extraordinary Gentlemen, Volume IV: The Tempest hardcover (collects vol. 4 #1–6) ISBN 978-1-60309-456-6 (January 2020)
  - The League of Extraordinary Gentlemen, Volume IV: The Tempest paperback (collects vol. 4 #1–6) ISBN 978-1-60309-496-2 (December 2021)

== Chronological settings ==
The League of Extraordinary Gentlemen comics are generally set in the 20th century, but the chronological order of the fictional world does not correspond with the order of release:

#	Title	Year
1	The League of Extraordinary Gentlemen, Volume I	1898 AD
1a	Allan and the Sundered Veil	1889 AD
2	The League of Extraordinary Gentlemen, Volume II	1898 AD
2a	The New Traveller's Almanac	1899 AD
3	The League of Extraordinary Gentlemen: The Black Dossier	1958 AD
3a	* The Black Dossier – Life of Orlando	1953 AD
3b	* The Black Dossier – Faerie's Fortunes Founded	1620 AD
3c	* The Black Dossier – The New Adventures of Fanny Hill	1912 AD
3d	* The Black Dossier – Shadows in the Steam	1908 AD
4	The League of Extraordinary Gentlemen, Volume III: Century – 1910	1910 AD
4a	Minions of the Moon, Chapter 1: Into the Limbus – Love Amongst the Troglodytes	1236 BC
4b	Minions of the Moon, Chapter 1: Into the Limbus – In the Wake of the Black Nautilus	1910 AD
4c	Minions of the Moon, Chapter 1: Into the Limbus – Her Long, Adorable Lashes	1964 AD
4d	Minions of the Moon, Chapter 1: Into the Limbus – Requiem for a Space-Wizard	1964 AD
4e	Minions of the Moon, Chapter 1: Into the Limbus – Coming Forth by Day	1964 AD
4f	Minions of the Moon, Chapter 1: Into the Limbus – Huckleberry Friends	1964 AD
5	The League of Extraordinary Gentlemen, Volume III: Century – 1969	1969 AD
5a	Minions of the Moon, Chapter 2: The Distance from Tranquility – Escape from Nowhere	1896 AD
5b	Minions of the Moon, Chapter 2: The Distance from Tranquility – Glass Shirts and Goose-Bones	1964 AD
5c	Minions of the Moon, Chapter 2: The Distance from Tranquility – Babes in Toyland	1896 AD
5d	Minions of the Moon, Chapter 2: The Distance from Tranquility – A Long Way from Baltimore	1964 AD
5e	Minions of the Moon, Chapter 2: The Distance from Tranquility – Skulls and Amazons	1964 AD
5f	Minions of the Moon, Chapter 2: The Distance from Tranquility – Give Me the Moonlight, Give Me the Girls...	1964 AD
6	The League of Extraordinary Gentlemen, Volume III: Century – 2009	2009 AD
6a	Minions of the Moon, Chapter 3: Saviours – A Cricket-Cap of Thorns	1901 AD
6b	Minions of the Moon, Chapter 3: Saviours – A Harsh Mistress	1964 AD
6c	Minions of the Moon, Chapter 3: Saviours – Moonbeams, Home in a Jar	1964 AD
6d	Minions of the Moon, Chapter 3: Saviours – A Moonlight Flit	1964 AD
6e	Minions of the Moon, Chapter 3: Saviours – A Sea of Crises	1964 AD
6f	Minions of the Moon, Chapter 3: Saviours – The Sins of the Father	1964 AD
7	Nemo: Heart of Ice	1925 AD
7a	A Perfect Match... And a Perfect Fuse!	1938 AD
8	Nemo: The Roses of Berlin	1941 AD
8a	The Johnson Report: Princess Dakkar of Lincoln	1965 AD
9	Nemo: River of Ghosts	1975 AD
10a	The League of Extraordinary Gentlemen, Volume IV: Tempest – Prologue I	2009 AD
10b	The League of Extraordinary Gentlemen, Volume IV: Tempest – Prologue II	2996 AD
10c	The League of Extraordinary Gentlemen, Volume IV: Tempest – Prologue III	2009 AD
10	The League of Extraordinary Gentlemen, Volume IV: Tempest	2010 AD
10d	Seven Stars	1964 AD
10e	The League of Extraordinary Gentlemen, Volume IV: Tempest – Epilogue I	1964 AD
10f	The League of Extraordinary Gentlemen, Volume IV: Tempest – Epilogue II	1968 AD
10g	The League of Extraordinary Gentlemen, Volume IV: Tempest – Epilogue III	2164 AD

Notes:

- "The New Traveller's Almanac" is published in 1931, and contains writings from 1625 to 1682, the mid- to late-1700s and 1890 to 1912.
- "Life of Orlando" is set from 1260 BC to 1943 AD, and is published in 1953.
- "The New Adventures of Fanny Hill" is set from 1750 to 1802, and is published in 1912.
- "Shadows in the Steam" is set in 1897, and is published in 1908.

== Leagues in history ==
There have been a number of versions of the League, and in particular in the comic book The League of Extraordinary Gentlemen: Black Dossier the membership and activities of these Leagues were fully explored, interwoven into an extensive world timeline.

=== 17th century: Prospero's Men ===
The first League was established at the behest of England's Queen Gloriana recommending that Italian sorcerer Prospero and his squire Orlando found a group of extraordinary individuals after her death who would operate independently of the government. This seems to have been done in the hope of establishing a bridgehead between her own faerie realm and the mortal world, via the ethereal Blazing World archipelago in the North Atlantic, in the wake of her successor King Jacob's ruthless purge of faeriekind from the British Isles, and the subsequent retreat of those magical elements from everyday life.

- Prospero, the Duke of Milan, the sorcerer protagonist of Shakespeare's 1611 play The Tempest. Before his League was assembled, he lived in Mortlake under the alias of John Subtle. The faux-Shakespeare fragment in The Black Dossier entitled Fairy's Fortunes Founded includes a list of Prospero's alter-egos, also including historical English occultist John Dee.
  - Caliban, Prospero's malformed, treacherous servant, also from The Tempest.
  - Ariel, a sprite and air spirit, bound to serve Prospero, also from The Tempest.
- Christian, a pilgrim Everyman, protagonist of John Bunyan's 1678 novel The Pilgrim's Progress.
- Captain Robert Owe-much, a British explorer and discoverer of the Floating Island called Scoti Moria or Summer Island, President of the Council of the Society of Owe-Much, and the central character from Richard Head's 1673 book The Floating Island (published under the pseudonym Frank Careless).
- Don Quixote, the Spanish aristocrat, from Miguel de Cervantes's Don Quijote de la Mancha.
- Amber St. Clair, the courtesan from Forever Amber by Kathleen Winsor.
- Orlando, the sex-changing immortal from many works, but drawn most closely from Virginia Woolf's Orlando: A Biography.

This League collapsed in 1690 when the unwilling extradimensional traveler Christian found the heavenly realm he had been searching for in order to lead him to his home, the Blazing World. Some years later Prospero followed him into this realm, as did Caliban and Ariel, thereby beginning the League's connection with this otherworldly realm as per Gloriana's desires.

=== 18th century: Gulliver's League ===
The second League was formed by Lemuel Gulliver in the 1750s and secretly gathered in Montague House, London, in service to the British Crown.

- Lemuel Gulliver, the far-flung protagonist from the 1726 novel Gulliver's Travels by Jonathan Swift.
- The Reverend Dr. Christopher Syn, also known as the pirate Captain Clegg, and later known as the Scarecrow, the vicar turned pirate turned smuggler from the Doctor Syn novels (1915–1944) of Russell Thorndike.
- Sir Percy and Lady Marguerite Blakeney from The Scarlet Pimpernel novels of Baroness Orczy published in 1905, set in late 1792.
- Nathanael "Natty" Bumppo, the hero of the Leatherstocking Tales (1827–1841) of James Fenimore Cooper, the most famous of which is The Last of the Mohicans. In Cooper's novels he is variously called Deerslayer, Hawkeye and Pathfinder as well as several other names.
- Frances "Fanny" Hill, the eponymous heroine of the 1749 erotic novel Fanny Hill by John Cleland.
- Orlando, the sex-changing immortal from many works, but drawn most closely from Virginia Woolf's Orlando: A Biography.

This League ended with the death of the elderly Gulliver in 1799. Natty Bumppo having already departed the League some time before, the remaining members continued their association for some time, though not in a capacity as agents of the Crown.

=== 19th century ===
==== The Time Traveler's League ====
"Allan and the Sundered Veil", the prose short story accompanying vol. 1 describes an unsuccessful attempt by the Time Traveler (the nameless hero of H. G. Wells' The Time Machine) to assemble a League of his own. This group drew three heroes from different points in time:

- Allan Quatermain, drawn from just before the formation of the first Murray Group.
- John Carter, Edgar Rice Burroughs' hero, drawn from just before his first journey to the red planet.
- Randolph Carter, of various works by H. P. Lovecraft, drawn from one of his first experiences with transcending reality through dreams (here supposed to be a distant relative of John).

It had been the Traveler's hope to create a group capable of heading off the looming threats of the Lovecraftian world of Yuggoth. This gathering proves ill-fated however, as the three heroes were each drawn from out-of-body experiences, and each returns to his own life before the Traveler can impart any knowledge of consequence about the enemy (though the denizens of Yuggoth would later prove to be persistent foes of later incarnations of the League).

==== Wilhelmina's First League ====
The Victorian League was led by Mina Harker, recruited for Military Intelligence by Campion Bond. They meet in the British Museum, built on the remains of Montague House. First convened (unknowingly) under the service of Professor Moriarty, they later report to Mycroft Holmes, brother of the great detective Sherlock Holmes.

- Wilhelmina Murray, of Bram Stoker's 1897 novel Dracula.
- Captain Nemo, the Indian submariner from Jules Verne's novels Twenty Thousand Leagues Under the Seas and The Mysterious Island, and his play Journey Through the Impossible.
- Allan Quatermain, the elephant hunter and African explorer of H. Rider Haggard's 1885 novel King Solomon's Mines and its various sequels.
- Dr. Henry Jekyll and Edward Hyde from Robert Louis Stevenson's 1886 novella Strange Case of Dr Jekyll and Mr Hyde.
- Hawley Griffin, also known as The Invisible Man, from the 1897 novel by H. G. Wells (Moore gave Griffin his first name, that of murderer Hawley Crippen).

Associates

- C. Auguste Dupin, of Edgar Allan Poe's "The Murders in the Rue Morgue" and its sequels, assisted Murray and Quatermain in capturing Jekyll / Hyde in Paris.
- Quong Lee, the storyteller of Thomas Burke's Limehouse Nights and its sequels, provided Murray and Griffin with valuable information regarding the location of the stolen Cavorite.
- William Samson Senior, father of Bill Junior, the Wolf of Kabul, served as the League's coachman during the Martian invasion.
- Dr. Alphonse Moreau, of H. G. Wells's The Island of Doctor Moreau, provided the League with a crucial weapon against the Martian invaders.

This League collapsed during the closing days of the Martian Invasion of 1898 following the deaths of Griffin and Jekyll/Hyde, and the resignation of Nemo. Quatermain and Murray went their separate ways shortly afterwards, although continued their ties with Campion Bond and British Intelligence as they traveled the world.

=== Early 20th century ===
==== Wilhelmina's Second League ====
A second League was formed by Mina in 1907, upon the return to England of herself, Quatermain and Orlando, whom they had met while traveling. Still meeting in the museum's secret vault, they continued to work for Mycroft Holmes' British Intelligence.

- Miss Wilhelmina Murray, of Bram Stoker's 1897 novel Dracula.
- Allan Quatermain Jr., a rejuvenated Allan Quatermain from H. Rider Haggard's 1885 novel King Solomon's Mines and its various sequels.
- Orlando, the sex-changing immortal from many works, but drawn most closely from Virginia Woolf's Orlando: A Biography.
- A. J. Raffles, reformed thief from E. W. Hornung stories.
- Thomas Carnacki, the occult detective from Carnacki, the Ghost-Finder by William Hope Hodgson.

Having tried (and failed) to avert disaster at George V's coronation in 1910 and battled their French equivalents in 1913 Paris, the end of Mina's Second League ostensibly came about with the outbreak of World War I, during which A. J. Raffles was killed. By the 1930s, an elderly Carnacki had retired for health reasons. In 1937, Murray, Quatermain and Orlando first made a clandestine excursion to the Blazing World, where they gained important future allies, unbeknownst to the government.

==== Les Hommes Mystérieux (The Mysterious Men) ====
Les Hommes Mystérieux are the French equivalent of the League, similarly composed of "questionable" or criminal individuals. In 1913, responding to psychic warnings received by Thomas Carnacki, Mina's second League traveled to the Paris Opera House to thwart a scheme of Les Hommes Mystérieux, where the two groups fought.

- Jean Robur, a mad genius who creates a flying machine, from The Clipper of the Clouds and The Master of the World, by Jules Verne.
- Arsène Lupin, a master thief, from the books written by Maurice Leblanc, recruited to counteract any benefits afforded to Mina's League by A. J. Raffles.
- Nyctalope, the first superhero written, created by Jean de La Hire.
- Fantômas, a criminal mastermind created by Pierre Souvestre and Marcel Allain.
- Monsieur Zenith, a man with albinism who uses drugs that give him superhuman abilities.

Les Hommes Mystérieux later participated in World War I, and during this conflict Jean Robur died when his airship was shot down at the Battle of the Somme. After the war, Les Hommes Mystérieux is rumored to have disbanded.

==== Die Zwielicht-Helden (The Twilight Heroes) ====
The German version of the League, known as Die Zwielicht-Helden ("The Twilight Heroes"), was formed around 1909 and based in the "newly constructed Berlin Metropolis". Its members were:

- Dr. Mabuse from a series of novels by Norbert Jacques, Mabuse is a criminal genius, gambler and hypnotist. Through his hypnotic powers his criminal energy can survive even his own death, possessing others.
- Dr. Caligari, the homicidal mesmerist, and Cesare, his mind-slave, both from The Cabinet of Dr. Caligari.
- Dr. Rotwang along with Maria, the female automaton he created, both from Fritz Lang's Metropolis.

Die Zwielicht-Helden was said to have survived up to the 1930s in different incarnations. Rotwang and Cesare both appear to have died prior to 1941 (presumably in the events of their respective films), while Maria was destroyed and Caligari killed in a confrontation with Janni Nemo in Berlin in 1941, leaving Mabuse the only surviving member of Die Zwielicht-Helden.

=== Late 20th century ===
==== The Failed Warralson League ====
Mina and Allan disappeared while on a mission to America in 1946, just before a totalitarian government came to power in Britain. Orlando, the only other surviving League member, also had vanished by this time (supposedly transformed by magic into an orange cat). MI5 assembled a team of replacements, each of whom was roughly intended to correspond to one of the members of Mina's original (Victorian) League, which arguably had been the most successful of all the incarnations.

- Miss Joan Warralson from the stories by W. E. Johns.
- William Samson Jr., the Wolf of Kabul, who appeared in Wizard and Hotspur. His father, William Sr., appeared in Volume II as a coachman to Murray's League.
- Peter Brady, the Invisible Man, from the television series The Invisible Man.
- Professor James Gray, the inventor of The Iron Fish submersible device, who appeared in The Beano. He is seen as a child in Volume II.
- The Iron Warrior, a giant robot from Thrill Comics and New Funnies.

Fraught by tensions and prone to failure from the outset, this team only went on one mission together—battling pirate-slaver James Soames and Italian criminal mastermind Count Zero (both from Frank Richards's Greyfriars School series)—before disbanding. During the course of the mission, the Iron Warrior was accidentally destroyed.

This marked the end of the League as a group in the employ of the British government. They later would operate outside the law as fugitives, following their own agenda rather than that of any official masters.

==== The post-Ingsoc Ensemble ====
By 1948 a totalitarian government (Ingsoc) was in control of Britain, which denounced and denied the League in all its forms. Many came to believe the extraordinary individuals never existed, and were nothing more than characters from fiction.

In 1958, not long after the Big Brother government's fall, the two surviving Leaguers (Mina Murray and Allan Quatermain) returned to London and broke into British Intelligence headquarters, stealing the Black Dossier that contained details of all the League's incarnations.

Newer and deadlier Cold War agents were tasked to stop them and retrieve the Dossier.

- M, Harry Lime, the antagonist from 1949's The Third Man.
- Jimmy, James Bond, the British spy created by Ian Fleming for the novel Casino Royale and its sequels.
- Miss Night, Emma Peel, spy and partner of John Steed in The Avengers.
- Uncle Hugo, Bulldog Drummond, adventurer and private detective in a series of novels.

Eventually successful, Mina and Allan departed to the Blazing World once more, far beyond the reach of the shadowy agencies pursuing them, where they were reunited with Orlando, Prospero, Fanny Hill, and many other previous members of the League. In the process of their pursuit Drummond was killed by Jimmy.

==== The Seven Stars League ====
In 1964, Mina assembled a short-lived British super team.

- Captain Universe, aka Jim Logan, interplanetary superhero created by Mick Anglo.
- Vull the Invisible, in actuality Mina Murray; the original Vull appeared in The Ranger written by Temple Murdoch.
- Mars Man, aka Garth Ganzz, a Martian explorer who came to Earth to study its "social life and civilization", from the Marsman Comics.
- Zom of The Zodiac, whose magic grants victims of crime the power to stand up to criminals, from Big Win comics.
- Satin Astro, featured in "Burt Steele and Satin Astro in the Year 3000 AD" by Dennis Reader in Whizzer Comics.
- The Flash Avenger, a chain-smoking dandy
- Electro Girl, aka Carol Flane, from G-Boy Comics, Whizzer Comics, and Super-Duper comics.

==== The Victory Vanguard ====
In the same year, MI5 assembled its own super team, which came into conflict with Mina's Seven Stars:

- Ace Hart, fission-powered superhero
- Mr. Apollo, aka schoolteacher Jeremy Gunn
- Mark Tyme, a time-traveller
- Tommy Walls, an ice-cream powered schoolboy
- Purple Hood
- Crash Brittannus
- Swift Morgan and his assistant, Silver

==== Murray group under Prospero ====
By 1969 Wilhelmina Murray, Allan Quatermain and Orlando are summoned by Prospero in order to investigate the recent activities of Oliver Haddo's sect. They settle in the Seven Stars' former headquarters and start searching for clues that eventually make them split ways. After ingesting a drug pill and meeting Haddo on the astral plane, Mina appears to be close to insanity and is taken away in an ambulance against her will, thus failing to rejoin her teammates. Mina's disappearance leads Allan to fall back into drug addiction. In the late 1970s, Orlando leaves Quatermain and joins the British Army.

=== 21st century: All that is left (2009) ===
By 2009, the League is defunct, until Orlando, recently discharged from the British Army, is tasked by Prospero to eliminate the Antichrist, and is reunited with Mina, and a now homeless and once-again drug addicted Allan who at first refuses to join them. Meanwhile, Jack Nemo, the last descendant of Captain Nemo, is waging a terrorist campaign in the Middle East. The League battles the Antichrist, who is holed up in a secret location with the still living head of Oliver Haddo.

- Miss Wilhelmina Murray, of Bram Stoker's 1897 novel Dracula, now a mental patient.
- Allan Quatermain Jr., relapsed drug-addict, from H. Rider Haggard's 1885 novel King Solomon's Mines and its various sequels.
- Orlando, now returning as a female immortal from many works, but drawn most closely from Virginia Woolf's Orlando: A Biography.
- Mary Poppins, a magically powerful woman who helps Mina fight the boy antichrist, from P. L. Travers' Mary Poppins books.

During the onslaught, Allan was killed while fighting the Antichrist. Soon after Night was granted immortality and left MI6. Allan's body was buried in the same grave in Africa where he faked his death.

=== Spoofs: Spoof 1988 American League ===
In 2010, the "League of Extraordinary Gentlemen – America: 1988" was announced as an April Fools' Day joke, complete with mocked-up cover. This 1988 league was the supposed successor to another league disbanded in 1979 by Oscar Goldman. The 1988 League was created after the murder of Mr. Miyagi to prevent a resurrected Tony Montana and his occult gang, the Lost Boys, from killing all those between him and domination of America.

- Emmett Brown, scientist from Back to the Future.
- Jack Burton, transportation specialist from Big Trouble in Little China.
- B. A. Baracus, ex-commando from The A-Team.
- Angus MacGyver, tech from MacGyver.
- "Lisa", mysteriously powerful femme fatale from Weird Science.
