= Electric Bob =

Science fiction character created by Robert T. Toombs

Electric Bob is a fictional science fiction dime novel character created by Robert T. Toombs. In the strips, Electric Bob's real name is Robert Morse and he is depicted as a descendant of a telegraph inventor named Samuel. He appears in a series of five novels in New York Five Cent Library published by Street & Smith. The character Electric Bob was a 10-year-old engineering genius and wealthy from inheritance. He is in the mold of boy inventors Frank Reade and Jack Wright, although not nearly as popular. The author's name is believed to be a pseudonym and little is known about who was behind the strip.

Electric Bob appeared in five novels beginning with "Electric Bob and His White Alligator" in issue 50, July 22, 1893. His inventions include an amphibious mechanical alligator, a flying hawk, a giant ostrich, a camel and a submarine.

== Appearances ==
- Brave and Bold No. 118, March 25, 1905, "Electric Bob's Sea-Cat; or, the Daring Invasion of Death Valley" by Robert T. Toombs.
- New York Five Cent Library No. 50, July 22, 1893, "Electric Bob and His White Alligator; or, Hunting for Confederate Treasure in the Missouri River" by a Celebrated Author" (Robert Toombs).
- New York Five Cent Library No. 55, August 26, 1893, "Electric Bob's Big Black Ostrich; or, Lost in the Desert" by the Author of "Electric Bob" (Robert Toombs). This work is available in the Internet Archive.
- New York Five Cent Library No. 59, September 23, 1893, "Electric Bob's Revenue Hawk; or, The Young Inventor Among the Moonshiners" by the Author of "Electric Bob" (Robert Toombs)
- New York Five Cent Library No. 63, October 21, 1893, "Electric Bob's Big Bicycle; or, The Nerviest Boy in the World" by the Author of "Electric Bob" (Robert Toombs).
