= Edisonade =

Literary genre

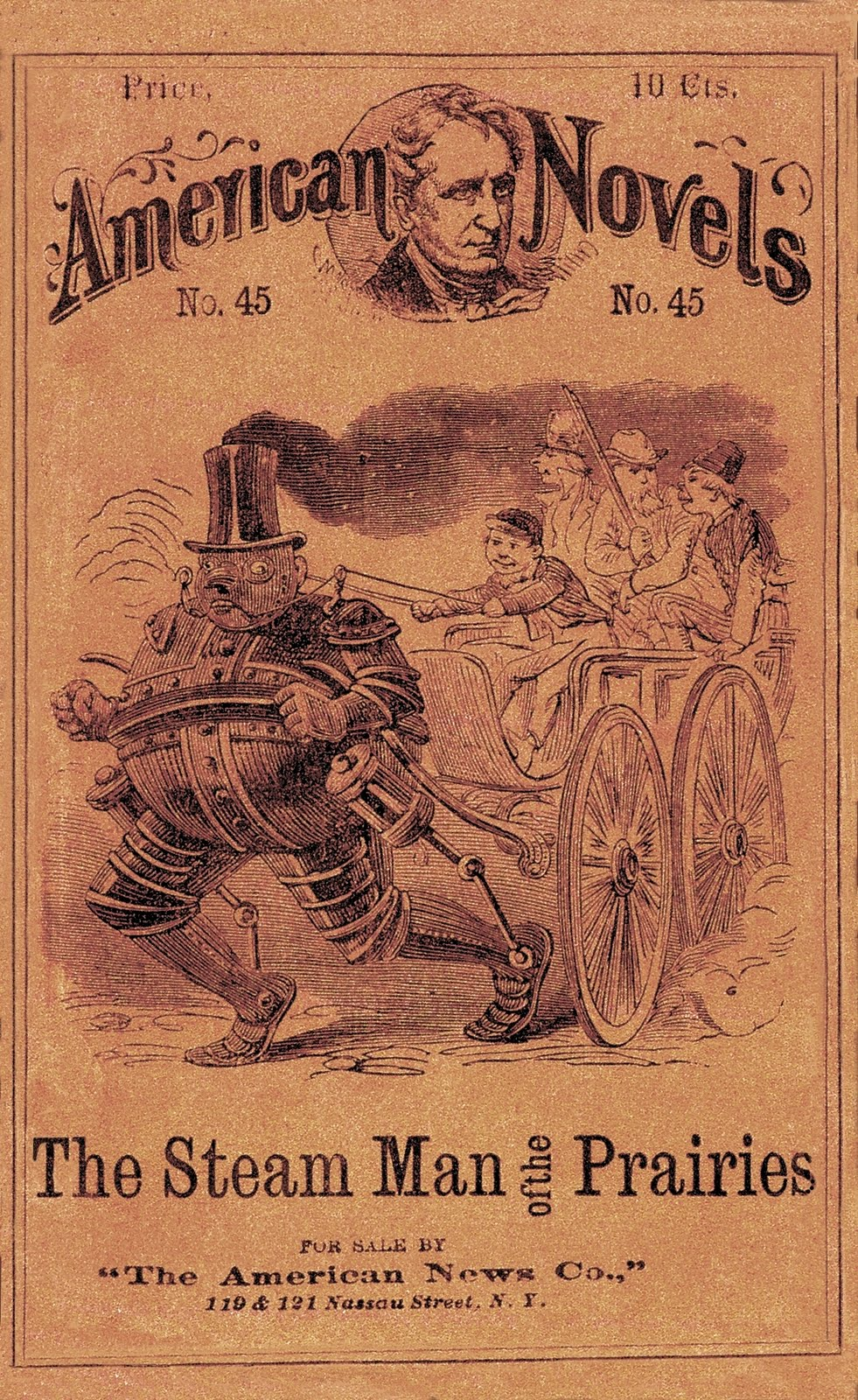
The Steam Man of the Prairies, a typical Edisonade

Edisonade is a genre of fictional stories about a brilliant young inventor and his inventions, many of which would now be classified as science fiction. This subgenre started in the Victorian and Edwardian eras, and had its apex of popularity during the late 19th and early 20th centuries. Other related terms for fiction of this type include scientific romances. The term was introduced in 1990 by John Clute and popularized in 1993 in his and Peter Nicholls' The Encyclopedia of Science Fiction. It is an eponym, named after famous inventor Thomas Edison, formed in the same way the term "Robinsonade" was formed from Robinson Crusoe.

== History ==
Usually first published in cheaply printed dime novels, most such stories were written to appeal to young boys. The edisonade formula was an outgrowth of the fascination with engineering and technology that arose near the end of the 1800s, and a derivative of the existing Robinsonade formula.

Clute defines the word in his book:

As used here the term "edisonade"—derived from Thomas Alva Edison (1847–1931) in the same way that "Robinsonade" is derived from Robinson Crusoe—can be understood to describe any story which features a young US male inventor hero who uses his ingenuity to extricate himself from tight spots and who, by so doing, saves himself from foreign oppressors.

and he defines it again in a column referring to "The Plutonian Terror" by Jack Williamson written in 1933:

It is an Edisonade, a paradigm kind of science fiction in which a brave young inventor creates a tool or a weapon (or both) that enables him to save the girl and his nation (America) and the world from some menace, whether it be foreigners or evil scientists or aliens; and gets the girl; and gets rich.

One frequent theme in edisonades was the exploration of little-known, "untamed" parts of the world. To that degree, the stories reflected the contemporaneous era of large-scale colonization and exploration.

== Examples ==
- The earliest example of the genre as expressed in young adult fiction is considered to be "The Steam Man of the Prairies" by Edward S. Ellis (1868), featuring fictional inventor Johnny Brainerd.
- The Frank Reade series first appeared in 1876, written by Harold Cohen (1854–1927) under the pseudonyms Harry Enton and "Noname". The first was "Frank Reade and His Steam Man of the Plains". After four titles, the series was continued as the adventures of Frank Reade Jr., written by ultra-prolific boys' fiction author Luis Senarens as "Noname".
- In Auguste Villiers de l'Isle-Adam's 1886 novel The Future Eve Thomas Edison is tasked with the construction of a female android.
- A series of stories featuring "Tom Edison, Jr." by Philip Reade were published between 1891 and 1892. The story "Tom Edison's Electric Mule, or, The Snorting Wonder of the Plains" (1892) is a parody of the earlier Frank Reade series.
- The Jack Wright series was created and written by Luis Senarens. The character first appeared in 1891, and was the subject of 121 stories.
- Thomas Edison himself was the main character in Edison's Conquest of Mars by Garrett P. Serviss (1898), a sequel to Fighters from Mars (in the form of a revenge fantasy), an unauthorized and altered adaptation of Wells's The War of the Worlds. Another real and famous inventor to appear in one of the stories was Nikola Tesla in To Mars with Tesla; or, the Mystery of the Hidden World.
- Five stories about an edisonade character named Electric Bob were published in 1893, written by Robert T. Toombs, which added a touch of wittiness and oddity to the genre.
- The original Tom Swift series of juvenile books are a continuation of the genre in the juveniles that followed dime novels.
- The Skylark of Space, considered to be the first space opera, begins as an edisonade before transitioning to the novel genre.
- A Pause in Space-Time by science fiction author Laurence Dahners is a modern edisonade about an impoverished but mathematically brilliant college student who invents a way to stop time in small, portable bits of space.

== See also ==
- Thomas Edison in popular culture
- Mad scientist, a similar trope, that of a brilliant scientist but with a twisted mind
- Steampunk, a modern pastiche of Edisonades and other early science fiction
