= The Steam Man of the Prairies =

1868 novel by Edward S. Ellis

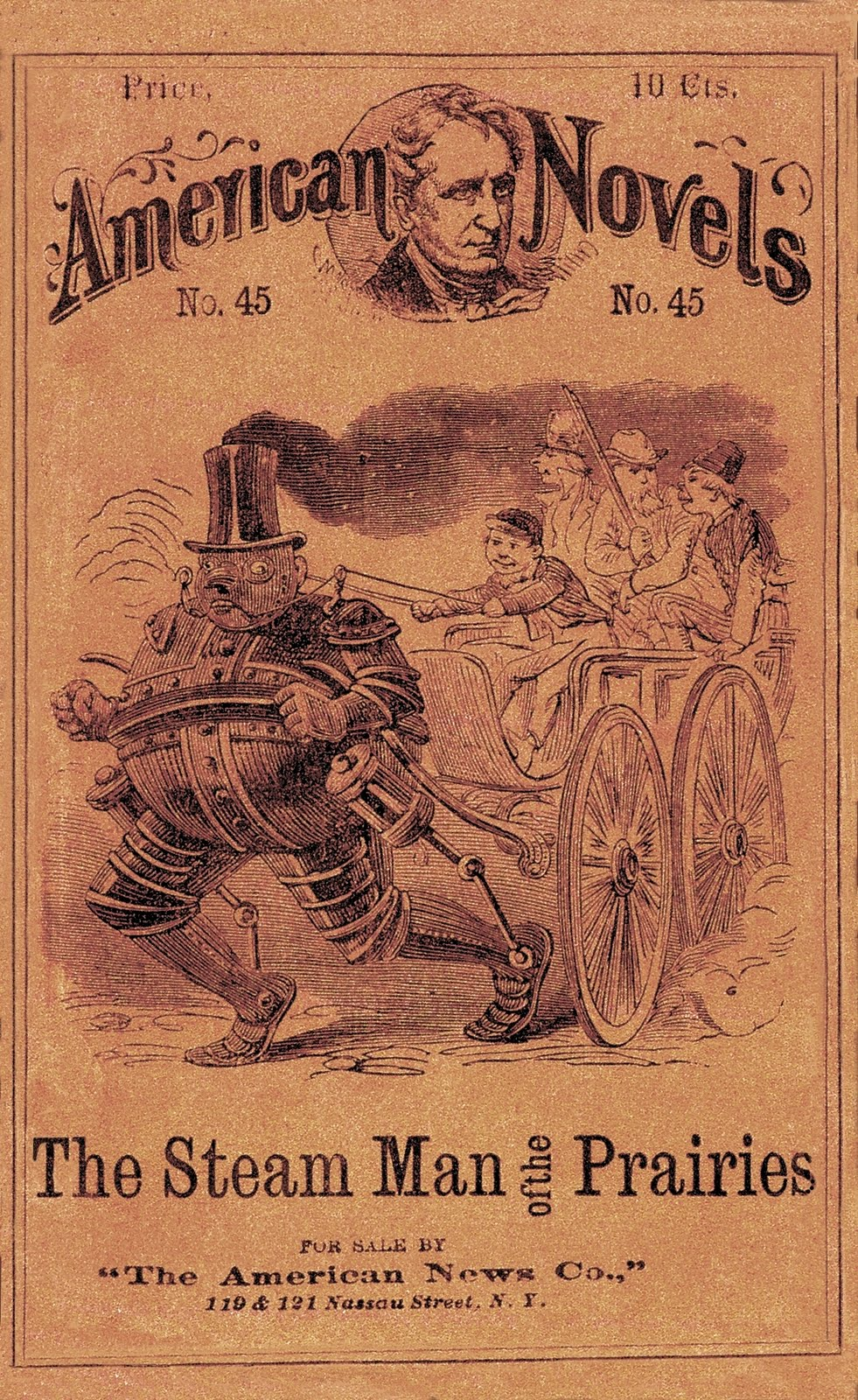
- Beadle's American Novel No. 45, August 1868, featuring The Steam Man of the Prairies
- Author: Edward S. Ellis
- Working title: The Huge Hunter
- Language: English
- Genre: Science fiction
- Published: 1868
- Publication place: United States
- Media type: Print
- Text: The Steam Man of the Prairies at Wikisource

The Steam Man of the Prairies by Edward S. Ellis was the first U.S. science fiction dime novel and archetype of the Frank Reade series. It is one of the earliest examples of the so-called "Edisonade" genre. Ellis was a prolific 19th-century author best known as a historian and biographer and a source of early heroic frontier tales in the style of James Fenimore Cooper. This novel may be inspired by the steam powered invention of Zadoc Dederick. The original novel was reissued six times from 1868 to 1904. A copy of the first 1868 printing with its cover intact is owned by the Rosenbach Museum and Library, Philadelphia.

== Summary ==
The first novel starts when Ethan Hopkins and Mickey McSquizzle—a "Yankee" and an "Irishman"—encounter a colossal, steam-powered man in the American prairies. This steam-man was constructed by Johnny Brainerd, a teenaged boy, who uses the steam-man to carry him in a carriage on various adventures.

== Modern appearances ==
The Steam Man, a five-issue limited series co-written by Mark Alan Miller and Joe R. Lansdale and illustrated by Piotr Kowalski, appeared from Dark Horse Comics beginning in 2015.

The character also appears in a few panels of Alan Moore's The League of Extraordinary Gentlemen and Nemo: Heart of Ice comics. He is also referenced in Warren Ellis; Planetary.

== Editions ==
- Beadle's American Novel No. 45, August 1868, featuring "The Steam Man of the Prairies" by Edward S. Ellis.
- Beadle's Half Dime Library Vol. 11 No. 271, October 3, 1882, featuring "The Huge Hunter; or, The Steam Man of the Prairies" by Edward S. Ellis.
- Beadle's Half Dime Library No. 1156, December 1904, featuring "The Huge Hunter; or, The Steam Man of the Prairies" by Edward S. Ellis.
- Beadle's New Dime Novels No. 591, January 27, 1885, featuring "The Huge Hunter; or, The Steam Man of the Prairies" by Edward S. Ellis.
- Beadle’s Pocket Novels No. 40, January 4, 1876, featuring "The Huge Hunter; or, The Steam Man of the Prairies" by Edward S. Ellis.
- Frank Starr's American Novels No. 14, 1869, featuring "The Huge Hunter; or, The Steam Man of the Prairies" by Edward S. Ellis
- Pocket Library No. 245, September 19, 1888, featuring "Baldy's Boy Partner; or, Young Brainerd's Steam Man" by Edward S. Ellis.
