= Sinibaldi =

Sinibaldi may refer to:

- Alejandro M. Sinibaldi (1825–1896), acting President of Guatemala from April 2 to April 5, 1885
- Bartolomeo Sinibaldi (1469 – c. 1523), sculptor of the Italian Renaissance
- Giovanni Benedetto Sinibaldi -17th century physician writing on human sexuality
- Guittoncino Sinibaldi (1270–1336/37), an Italian jurist and poet
- Jean-Paul Sinibaldi (1857-1909), French painter
- Marino Sinibaldi, Italian journalist and literary critic
- Pierre Sinibaldi (born 1924), French former football player and manager
- Raffaele Sinibaldi (c. 1504/1505 – c. 1566/1567), sculptor and architect of the Italian Renaissance, apprentice of Michelangelo

== See also ==
- Sinibaldi (typeface) owned by Nebiolo Printech
