= The Floating Island (Head novel) =

1673 novel by Richard Head

The Floating Island is a 1673 satirical novel by Richard Head, though he published it under the name of Frank Careless. It is a parody of adventure fiction, describing the travels of captain Robert Owe-much through distant lands, which reference various neighbourhoods of London. The character of Captain Robert Owe-much appears in Alan Moore's The League of Extraordinary Gentlemen as a member of Prospero's Men, a seventeenth century League.
