= Richard Head =

17th-century Irish writer

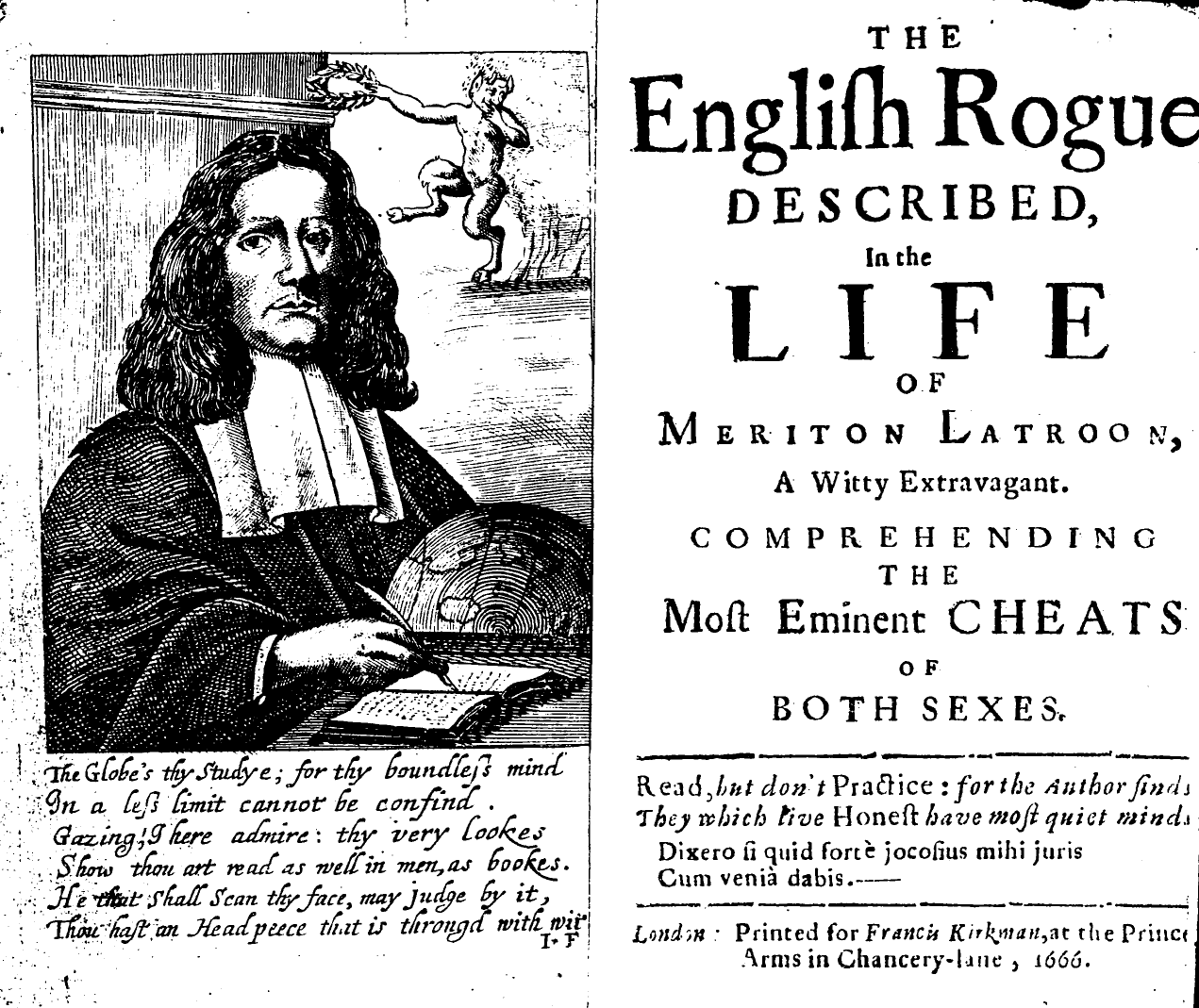
Richard Head as depicted on the frontispiece to the second edition of his The English rogue described in the life of Meriton Latroon (London: F. Kirkman, 1666).

Richard Head (c. 1637 – before June 1686) was an Irish author, playwright and bookseller. He became famous with his satirical novel The English Rogue (1665), one of the earliest novels in English that found a continental translation.

== Life ==
The most important primary source on Head's life is William Winstanley's biographical entry published in his Lives of the most famous English poets (1687) – a credible if not reliable source insofar as Winstanley could claim to have been personally acquainted with Head. According to Winstanley, Head was a minister's son, born in Ireland. His father was killed in the Irish rebellion of 1641; the incidents seem to be reflected in Head's The English Rogue, the satirical romance he published in 1665. His mother took him to England where she had relatives in Barnstaple. They later moved on to Plymouth, and to Bridport in Dorset where Head is known to have attended the town's grammar school in 1650. Head was eventually admitted to the same Oxford college his father had attended (possibly New Inn Hall, from which a John Head graduated in 1628). His financial means being insufficient Head was taken from college and bound apprentice to a "Latin bookseller" in London "attaining to a good Proficiency in the Trade", as Winstanley put it.

"His genius being addicted to Poetry" he published his first poetical and satirical piece which Winstanley recorded as Venus Cabinet Unlock'd. This may be a reference to Giovanni Benedetto Sinibaldi's The cabinet of Venus unlocked, and her secrets laid open. Being a translation of part of Sinibaldus, his Geneanthropeia, and a collection of some things out of other Latin authors, never before in English (London: Philip Briggs, 1658). Head married around that time. A second addiction to gambling cost him the profit he made as an author and with his shop.

Head moved – or fled – to his homeland Ireland, where he gained esteem with his first comedy Hic et ubique, or, The Humors of Dublin – printed with a dedication to James Scott, 1st Duke of Monmouth at his return to England in 1663. The Duke's recompense remaining below expectations Head had to survive as a bookseller with shop addresses (so Sidney Lee) in Little Britain, and (so Gerard Langbaine) in Petty Canons Alley, off Paternoster Row and opposite Queen's Head Alley. Winstanley located him in Queen's Head Alley. If his reports are trustworthy, Head gathered some wealth in little time only to gamble it away again a little later.

The English Rogue (1665) solved some of his financial problems. Its tales of drastic adventures were based on the model of Spanish rogue stories (such as Lazarillo de Tormes 1554), which were fashionable due to the contemporary publication of Scarron's Roman Comique (or Comical Romance, so the English title which established the genre), and savoury with the events Head could claim to have based on his personal experience. The censor, so Winstanley reported, rejected the manuscript as "too much smutty". The softened book edition sold brilliantly and created a complex publishing history: the first edition published by Henry Marsh sold out within the year. Marsh died that very year, Francis Kirkman the business partner, to whom Marsh had been indebted, secured the rights and sold Head's title in four further editions between 1666 and 1667. It remains unclear how the ensuing volumes two, three, and four, published in 1671, 1674 and 1680, came to be written (a fifth was promised and never appeared). Winstanley speaks of Head as the author indiscriminately. In the dedication to his Proteus redivivus (1675) Head, however, explicitly denies a hand in any part but the first. Kirkman asserted nonetheless that he and Head were responsible for the third and fourth parts. The preface to the latter is signed by both men – facts which make Head's belated disclaimer suspicious.

Head's imprint as a publisher is found on several titles. Works from his pen appeared until 1677. Winstanley reports that Head drowned on a journey to the Isle of Wight; the report itself was made in June 1686, and this generally accepted as the date of his death, even though more accurately it is a terminus ante quem.

== Literary impact ==
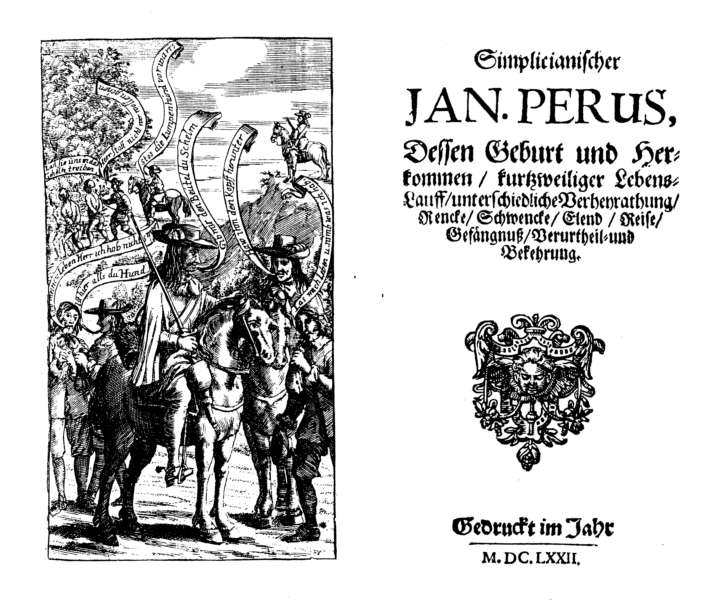
Published in 1672: the German translation of Head's English Rogue (1665) – title page and frontispiece

Richard Head's English Rogue became one of the first works of English prose fiction to be translated into a continental language. Its German title was Simplicianischer Jan Perus, dessen Geburt und Herkommen, kurtzweiliger Lebens-Lauff, unterschiedliche Verheyrathung, Rencke, Schwencke, Elend, Reise, Gefängnuß, Verurtheil- und Bekehrung (1672), – the title being designed to sell the English work on the very market Hans Jakob Christoffel von Grimmelshausen had recently created with his Simplicius Simplicissimus (1666–1668).

Numerous imitations of Head's rogue story followed on the English market such as The French Rogue: or, The Life of Monsieur Ragoue de Versailles (1672) (identified in several library catalogues as another of Head's works); the most famous descendant is today probably Daniel Defoe's The Fortunes and Misfortunes of the Famous Moll Flanders (1722).

== Works ==
- A threefold cord to unite soules for ever unto God. 1. The mysterie of godlinesse opened. 2. The imitation of Christ proposed. 3. The crowne of afflicted saints promised. As it was compacted by M. Richard Head, M.A.and sometimes minister of the Gospel, in his labours at Great Torrington in Devon. Published now, after his death, for publike profit (London: Printed by E.P. for Fr. Coles, and are to be sold at his shop in the Old-Bayly, at the Signe of the Halfe-Bowle, 1647).
- The Christians dayly solace in experimentall observations; or, cordials for crosses in these sad and calamitous times of affliction. By R.H. (London: printed for Richard Skelton, at the Hand and Bible in Duck-Lane; Isaac Pridmore at the Golden Falcon, near the New Exchange; and Henry Marsh at the Princes Arms in Chancery-Lane, 1659).
- Hic et ubique, or, The humours of Dublin a comedy, acted privately, with general applause written by Richard Head, Gent (London: Printed by R.D. for the Author, 1663).
- The English rogue described in the life of Meriton Latroon, a witty extravagant being a compleat [sic] history of the most eminent cheats of both sexes (London: Printed for Henry Marsh, 1665).
- The Red-Sea, or, The description of a most horrid, bloody, and never yet parallel'd sea-fight between the English & Dutch with an elegy on that truly valiant and renowned commander, Sir Christopher Minnes, who died in the bed of honour, in defence of his king and countrey by R.H. (London: Printed by Peter Lillicrap ..., 1666).
- The canting academy, or, The devils cabinet opened wherein is shewn the mysterious and villanous practices of that wicked crew, commonly known by the names of hectors, trapanners, gilts, &c. : to which is added a compleat [sic] canting-dictionary, both of old words, and such as are now most in use : with several new catches and songs, compos'd by the choisest wits of the age (London: Printed by F. Leach for Mat. Drew, 1673).
- The floating island, or, A new discovery relating the strange adventure on a late voyage from Lambethana to Villa Franca, alias Ramallia, to the eastward of Terra del Templo, by three ships, viz. the Pay-naught, the Excuse, the Least-in-sight, under the conduct of Captain Robert Owe-much, describing the nature of the inhabitants, their religion, laws and customs, published by Franck Careless, one of the discoverers ([London : s.n.], 1673).
- Jackson's recantation, or, The life & death of the notorious high-way-man, now hanging in chains at Hampstead delivered to a friend a little before execution: wherein is truly discovered the whole mystery of that wicked and fatal profession of padding on the road (London: Printed for T.B., 1674).
- The western wonder, or, O Brazeel, an inchanted island discovered with a relation of two ship-wracks in a dreadful sea-storm in that discovery: to which is added, a description of a place, called, Montecapernia, relating the nature of the people, their qualities, humours, fashions, religions, &c. (London: Printed for N.C., 1674).
- The miss display'd, with all her wheedling arts and circumventions in which historical narration are detected, her selfish contrivances, modest pretences, and subtil stratagems by the author of the first part of The English rogue (London: Printed and are to be sold by the several booksellers, 1675).
- Nugae venales, or, Complaisant companion being new jests, domestick and forreign, bulls, rhodomontados, pleasant novels and miscellanies (London: Printed by W.D. 1675).
- Proteus redivivus, or, The art of wheedling or insinuation obtain'd by general conversation and extracted from the several humours, inclinations, and passions of both sexes, respecting their several ages, and suiting each profession or occupation collected and methodised by the author of the first part of the English rogue (London: Printed by W.D. ..., 1675).
- The life and death of Mother Shipton being not only a true account of her strange birth and most important passages of her life, but also all her prophesies, now newly collected and historically experienced from the time of her birth, in the reign of King Henry the Seventh until this present year 1667, containing the most important passages of state during the reign of these kings and queens of England ... : strangely preserved amongst other writings belonging to an old monastery in York-shire, and now published for the information of posterity (London: Printed for B. Harris ..., 1677).

== Sources ==
- William Winstanley, 'The lives of the most famous English poets' (1687), 207–10. Gutenberg e-text
- Gerard Langbaine, An account of the English dramatick poets (1691), 246–7.
- J. Caulfield, Portraits, memoirs, and characters, of remarkable persons, from the reign of Edward the Third, to the revolution, 3 vols. in 1 (1813), 212–13.
- H. R. Plomer and others, A dictionary of the booksellers and printers who were at work in England, Scotland, and Ireland from 1641 to 1667 (1907), 94–5.
- S. McSkimin, "Biographical sketches: some account of the noble family of Chichester", in The history and antiquities of the county of the town of Carrickfergus, ed. E. J. M'Crum (1909), 469–70.
- R. C. Bald, "Francis Kirkman, bookseller and author", Modern Philology, 41 (1943–44), 17–32.
- Margaret Claire Katanka, Richard Head, 1637?–1686? A Critical Study, Thesis (Ph. D.)--University of Birmingham, 1975.
- Jonathan Pritchard, "Head, Richard (c.1637–1686?)", Oxford Dictionary of National Biography, Oxford University Press, 2004 http://www.oxforddnb.com/view/article/12810, accessed 31 July 2007.
