= Francis W. Doughty =

American screenwriter and novelist

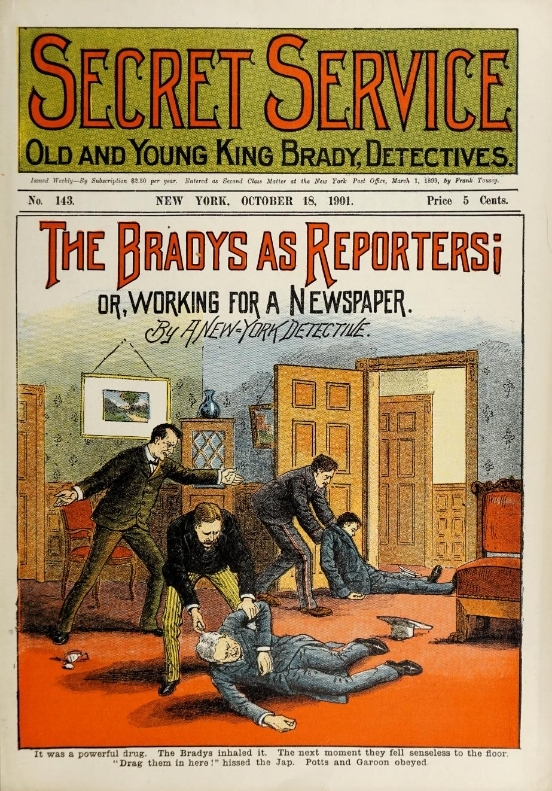
1901 Francis W. Doughty's book

Francis Worcester Doughty (November 5, 1850 – October 30, 1917) was an American screenwriter and novelist. Doughty held unorthodox views about the age of humans.

== Biography ==
Doughty was born in Brooklyn, and wrote Old King Brady dime novel stories for Frank Tousey. He wrote around 1500 novels. Doughty specialized in detective stories, and had the characteristic of repeating the title in the final sentence of the story.

In 1914, he was recruited to work on the Thanhouser serial, Zudora, writing episodes 11 to 20.

Doughty was also a numismatist and coin collector. He wrote The Cents of the United States, A Numismatic Study (1890) and his collection (containing 1539 lots) was sold at auction in 1891.

== Evidences of Man in the Drift ==
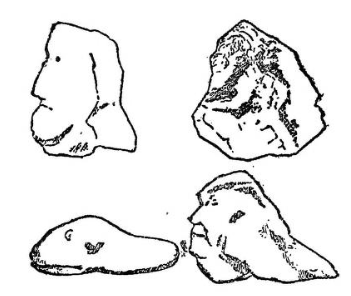
Sketch of Doughty's stones

Doughty authored the book, Evidences of Man in the Drift in 1892. He believed that humans existed during the Tertiary period in America, citing as evidence, pebbles and ferruginous nodules from the glacial drift that he believed depicted art of early humans. Doughty was convinced that upon the flattened surfaced clay stones he had found, animal and human figures could be seen, including men with Caucasian features.

Doughty rejected the theory of continental glaciation and endorsed the pseudohistorical view of Ignatius Donnelly, that the "drift was suddenly thrown upon the earth either by the contact of our planet with a comet or by some other agency not understood." The book was negatively reviewed by geologist William John McGee who commented that it is a "bundle of absurdities worthy of notice only because it is representative of the vain imaginings so prevalent among unscientific collectors."

Archaeologist A. F. Berlin negatively reviewed the book, noting its "absurd and ridiculous statements, assertions a true archaeologist would not for a moment give a thought, and much less print." He concluded that Doughty had a wild imagination by seeing in "glacial and rolled stones remains of human art, when indeed they are but the result of Earth's elements and chemical action."

== Selected publications ==
- The Cents of the United States: A Numismatic Study (1890)
- Evidences of Man in the Drift (1892)
