= Daniel (automaton) =

Cart-pulling automaton

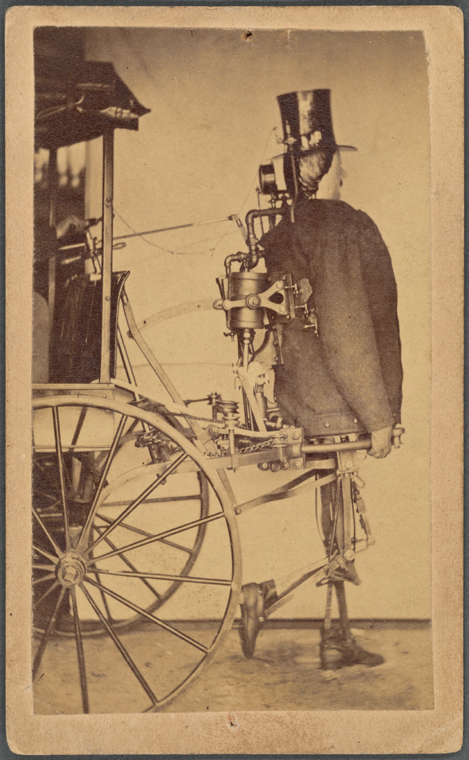
1868 photograph of Daniel by George O. Bedford

Daniel was a humanoid, steam-powered automaton built by Zadoc Pratt Dederick, an American machinist, inventor, and patent attorney. In 1868, at the age of 22, Dederick, along with machinist Isaac Grass, who was possibly 15–16 years old, created the machine, which was designed to pull a cart, after six years of work. Nicknamed Daniel after Daniel Lambert by workmen hired by Dederick, the invention was patented on March 24, 1868, as patent 75874, and operated through a system of levers and cranks, attached to steam-powered pistons and a boiler. The original prototype cost $2,000 ($48,375 in 2025) and was built in Newark, New Jersey. Plans to produce it for $300 ($7,256 in 2025) never went through, making this an example of an early development in steam power that was abandoned. Nonetheless, inventions such as this one spurred interest in steam power, as exemplified by novels such as The Steam Man of the Prairies, and by many imitations and hoaxes that appeared as a result.

== The steam man ==
=== Design ===
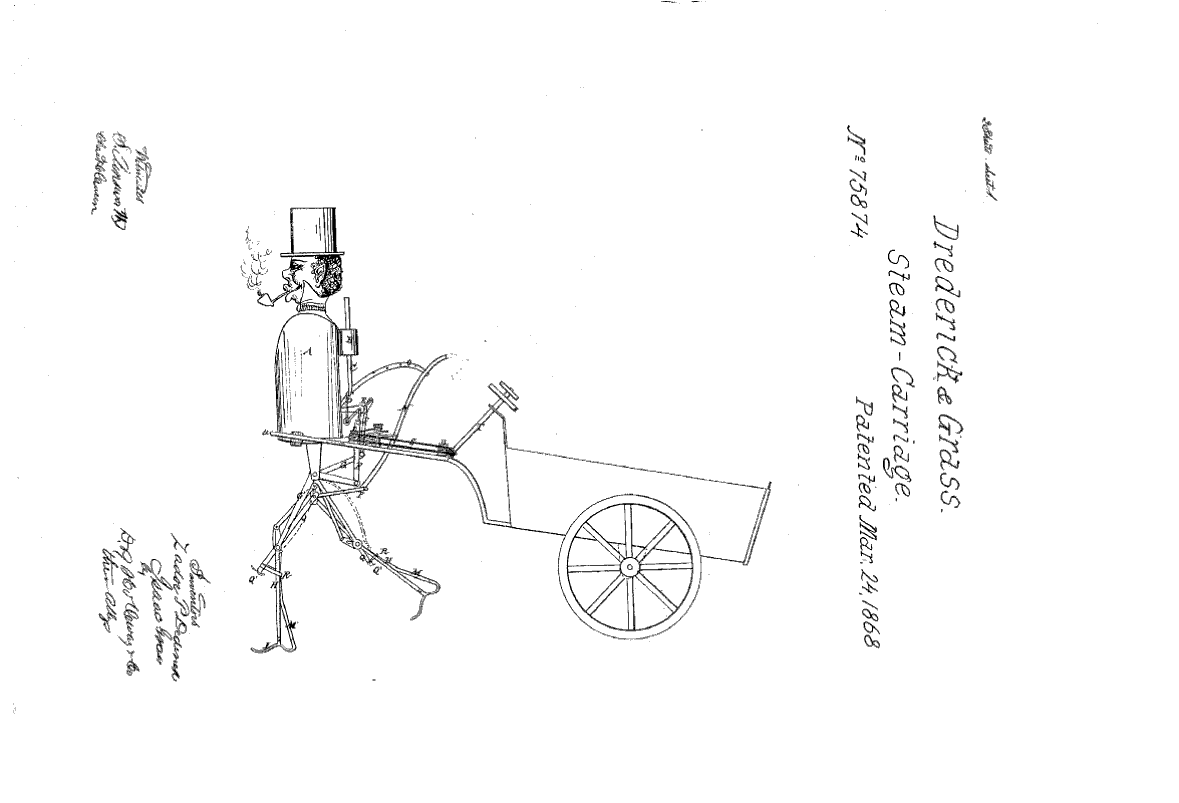
The patent application for Improvement in Steam-Carriage filed in 1868 depicts the machine as a black caricature.

Daniel was seven feet, nine inches tall (2.4 m) and weighed 500 pounds (318 kg). The schematics depicted him as a black caricature, which, according to Taylor Evans, suggested "a visual concordance between harnessing steam power (and all its explosive potential) and harnessing racialized, enslaved labor." In order to prevent Daniel from frightening horses, the prototype was clothed and given, "as nearly as possible, a likeness to the rest of humanity" (aka a white face). Though, this did not prevent contemporaries, including Southerners, from regarding the steam man as a kind of substitute for workers of color or lost slave work. Newspapers praised its potential to provide cheap labor without creating competition for wages or votes.

=== Function ===
Daniel's chest was a boiler, with a fire-box in the center and a water-jacket around it. His small engine reportedly only needed coaling every 2-3 hours, which could be done by simply unbuttoning his vest and shoveling some in. The vest covered felt and woolen undergarments to resist scorching by the boiler and a knapsack was to be used to cover the cocks and gauges on its back. His hollow top hat served as a smokestack.

A piston rod extending from Daniel's back provided power to his articulated legs through two connecting rods. According to the patent, "As the two sets of rods turn, therefore, upon different centres, the foot is turned down at the toe as one leg falls behind the other, and the knee bent, so that as the foot is thrown forward, it is raised by bending the knee, to step over any obstacle, the foot being turned downwards at the toe before being placed on the ground." To prevent Daniel from toppling over, a pair of iron shafts extended from his midsection, connecting him to a wheeled carriage that followed behind. This carriage not only served as a stabilizer but also acted as a platform for a driver to sit and steer, as well as a space for hauling goods. Apparently, the three-horsepower engine, like those used in steam fire engines, allowed Daniel to go 60 miles per hour, though its speed would be cut in half for safety on cobblestoned streets, as fast as most trains would travel back then.

=== Showings ===
Dederick, possibly with Grass, publicly exhibited Daniel at Crump's Garden in Newark in late January and February. Although the report from the Chicago Tribune made it seem like Daniel paraded down the street, according to Steve Carper, Dederick at most got Daniel's legs to move before packing him up for transfer. A Crump's Garden, there was not "room for it to walk, its feet have been lifted from the floor, and the giant 'goes through the motions' in the most satisfactory style."

Later, in February and March, at 538 Broadway, across the street from P. T. Barnum's museum of bunkum, Dederick showed off Daniel but was prevented from showing Daniel's walking because it would not be permitted by the insurance company. Instead, the owner of the hall permitted Daniel to be "hung in slings and merely '[mark] time' as our military friends would say"

The only positive evidence that Daniel ever worked as intended appeared in a 1931 article in the Newark Evening News, which quoted the recollections of a man named Mr. Hunt, who, recalling his childhood, "testified that as a boy he saw the robot tried out and that there was great excitement among the equine population and great objection on the part of drivers." According to Steve Carper, Hunt may have confused this event with the arrival of a steam carriage invented by Joseph Battin of Elizabeth, New Jersey, which was also tried out in Newark around that time, and because the idea that Daniel could work defies mechanical reality.

In the leadup to the 1868 Presidential election, the New York Herald humorously put the steam man up for president to replace Andrew Johnson, and another paper put him up for Ulysses S. Grant's running mate.

Daniel continued to be exhibited in various cities including Boston, Chicago, Philadelphia, St. Louis, New Orleans, and Fort Wayne, though with limitations set by insurance companies. By autumn 1870, the "Steam Man sank into obscurity".

== Later life ==
According to an article in the Newark Advertiser, Dederick's team also planned on making a steam steed with the power of 12 horses.

In 1876, Dederick moved to Sherman, Texas, where he founded The Dederick Well Machine Works, specializing in the manufacture of well drilling machinery to serve the expanding oil industry and other uses. He also worked as a patent attorney and created two more patents: Nr. 599074, 15 Feb. 1898, for Acetylene-Gas Generator, and Nr. 845765, 5 March 1907, for Automatic Mail and Parcel Delivery Apparatus. Dederick either died in Houston in 1921 or on 22 February 1923 in Sherman.

== See also ==
- History of steam road vehicles

== Works cited ==
- Nocks, Lisa (2007). The robot : the life story of a technology. Westport, Conn. [u.a.]: Greenwood Press. p. 50. ISBN 978-0-313-33168-8. "Zadoc P. Dederick."
- Nielsen, Wendy C. (2022). Motherless Creations: Fictions of Artificial Life, 1650-1890. Taylor & Francis. p. 201–203. ISBN 9781000582413.
- Carper, Steve (2019). Robots in American Popular Culture. McFarland. p. 46–49. ISBN 9781476635057.
