= Giovanni Benedetto Sinibaldi =

Giovanni Benedetto Sinibaldi (active second half of 17th century) was an Italian physician and author. He is mainly known for a peculiar work, written in Latin, about sexual activity and afflictions, titled:

- Geneanthropeiae, siue de hominis Generatione, Decateuchon: Ubi ex ordine quaecunque ad Humanea Generationis liturgiam, ciusdemque Principia, Organa, Tempus, Usum, Modum, Occasionem, Voluptatem, aliasque omne affectiones, quae in aprhodisiis accidere quoquomodo solent, ac possunt.

First published in 1642 in Rome, and reprinted in 1649 in Frankfort, the work is a mixture of homily, mythology, potions and unguents, and classic poetry attempting to address issues of human and animal sexuality and love. He describes the items used to make aphrodisiacs, and the treatment of ailments of the sex organs. Sinibaldi refers to himself as an archiatrist (doctor and pharmacist) and professor of practical medicine in a Roman school (archigymnasio). The book was somewhat raunchily satirized by the Irish-English author-bookseller Richard Head in a 1658 pamphlet titled: The cabinet of Venus unlocked, and her secrets laid open. Being a translation of part of Sinibaldus, his Geneanthropeia, and a collection of some things out of other Latin authors, never before in English (London: Philip Briggs, 1658).

He was born in Leonessa. He also published Hippocrates antiphon (1630, Rome). Jacopo Sinibaldi (1641-1720) was professor and dean of the College of Medicine of La Sapienza in Rome.
