= Robert Dederick =

South African poet (1919–1983)

Robert St Clair Dederick (27 September 1919 – 8 December 1983) was a South African poet.

He was born in Atherton, Lancashire, England, 27 September 1919 and died in Cape Town, South Africa, 8 December 1983.

He won the South African State Poetry prize in 1967 and the Thomas Pringle Award for creative writing in 1971.

He was educated at Taunton School, Somerset and served in the British Army during World War II. He worked as a solicitor in England 1947-1951 and emigrated to Cape Town, South Africa in 1951. He married Sheila (née Solomon) in 1949 and had four children. He worked as a legal advisor for BP Southern Africa 1952–1981. His nephew was the British poet, Pete Morgan.

Robert Dederick published two collections of poems, The Quest and other Poems and Bifocal. He was a regular contributor to The Cape Times, Standpunte, New Coin, Contrast, etc. His work is represented in a number of anthologies including The Penguin Book of South African Verse, Inscapes, A Century of South African Poetry and Halala Madiba: Nelson Mandela in Poetry.

The phrase "Ah big yaws?" from his poem A Variation on a Theme of Thomas Hardy's was used as the title of Robin Malan's book on South African English and his poem A Prayer in the Pentagon provided inspiration for the song Typical Situation by Dave Matthews.

Robert Dederick was also a freelance sports reporter on cricket and field hockey for the Cape Argus and in later years became a regular broadcaster on the English radio station of the South African Broadcasting Corporation (SABC). He was an active member of the Owl Club, Cape Town.

== Works ==
Poetry collections

The Quest and other Poems. Purnell, Cape Town, 1968.

Bifocal. David Philip, Cape Town, 1974.
