= Jack Wright (character) =

Fictional character

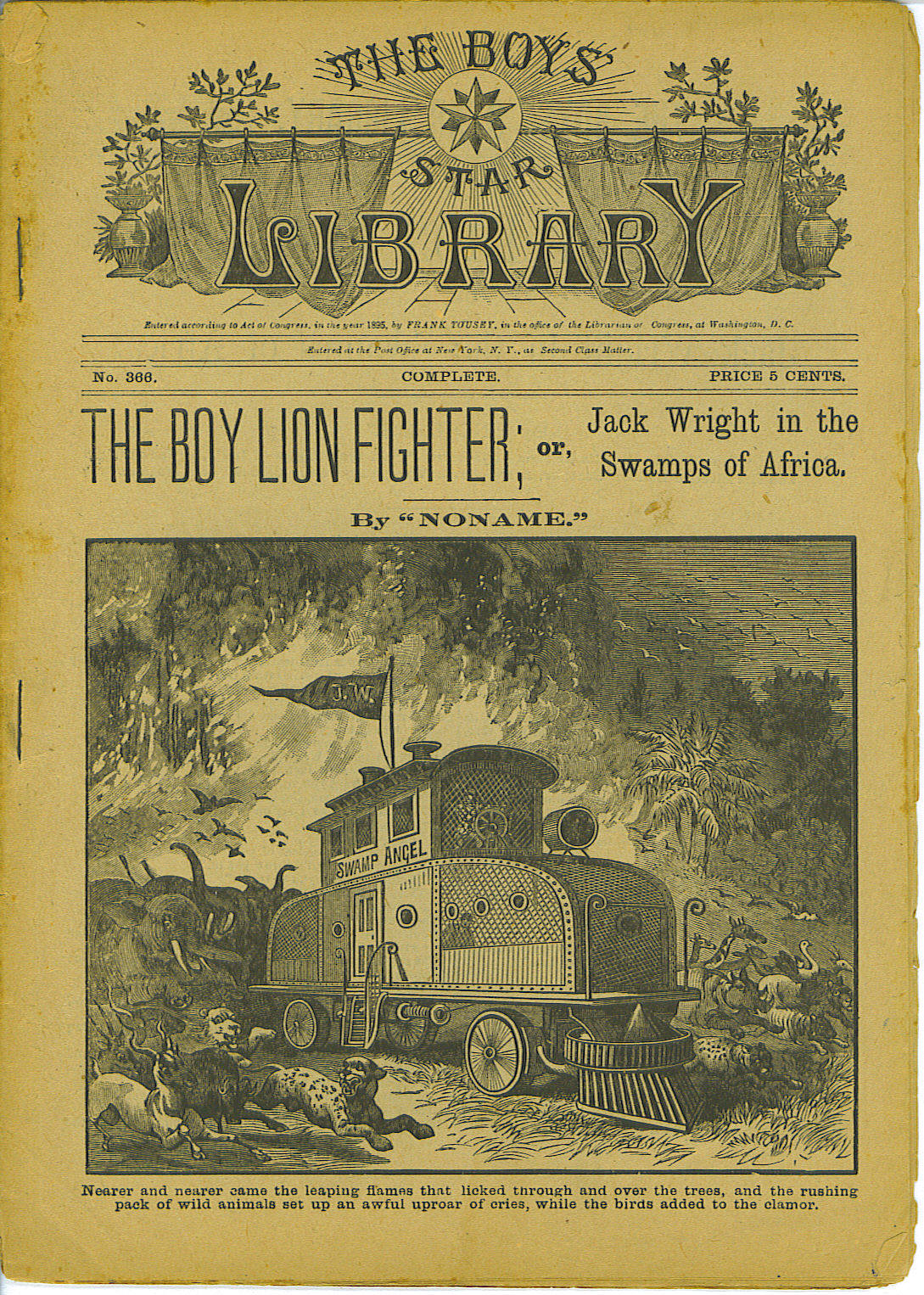
- The Boys' Star Library No. 366, 1895 featuring "The Boy Lion Fighter; or, Jack Wright in the Swamps of Africa"
- Author: Noname (Luis Senarens)
- Genre: Science fiction
- Published: 1895

Jack Wright was the hero of a popular series of Victorian science fiction dime novels and story papers written by Luis Senarens, the so-called "American Jules Verne". A few stories are also credited to Francis W. Doughty. Jack appeared in original stories from in 1891 to 1896 in 120 novels. He first appeared in The Boys' Star Library No. 216, July 18, 1891, "Jack Wright, the Boy Inventor; or, Hunting for a Sunken Treasure".

Senarens also popularized the Frank Reade dime novel series, having taken the reins from Harry Enton (real name Harold Cohen). Jack Wright appeared in Frank Tousey's Boys of New York and Boys' Star Library, and then migrated to Golden Weekly and Happy Days story papers. These stories were later reprinted in the dime novel Pluck and Luck. Jack Wright is one of the so-called Edisonade characters. The stories were reprinted by Aldine in the UK first in the Cheerful Library and then in the Invention, Travel & Adventure Library.

== Examples ==
- Jack Wright, The Boy Inventor (1891)
- Jack Wright And His Electric Turtle (1891)
- Jack Wright's Submarine Catamaran (1891)
- Jack Wright And His Ocean Racer (1891)
- Jack Wright And His Electric Canoe (1891)
- Jack Wright's Air And Water Cutter (1891)
- Jack Wright And His Magnetic Motor (1891)
- Jack Wright And His Under-Water Iron-clad (1891)
- Jack Wright And His Deep Sea Monitor (1891)
- Jack Wright And His Electric Deer (1892)
- Jack Wright And His Prairie Engine (1892)
- Jack Wright And His Electric Air Schooner (1892)
- Jack Wright And His Electric Sea-Motor (1892)
- Jack Wright And His Ocean Sleuth-Hound (1892)
- Jack Wright And His Dandy Of The Deep (1892)
- Jack Wright And Electric Torpedo Ram (1892)
- Jack Wright, The Boy Inventor, Exploring Central Asia (1892)
- Jack Wright And His Ocean Plunger (1892)
- Jack Wright And His Electric 'Sea-Ghost' (1892)
- Jack Wright, The Boy Inventor, And His Deep Sea Diving Bell (1892)
- Jack Wright, The Boy Inventor, And His Electric Tricycle-Boat (1892)
- Jack Wright And His Undersea Wrecking Raft (1892)
- Jack Wright And His Terror Of The Seas (1892)
- Jack Wright And His Electric Diving Boat (1892)
- Jack Wright And His Submarine Yacht (1892)
- Jack Wright And His Electric Gunboat (1893)
- Jack Wright And His Electric Sea Launch (1893)
- Jack Wright And His Electric Bicycle-Boat (1893)
- Jack Wright And His Electric Side-Wheel Boat (1893)
- Jack Wright's Wonder Of The Waves (1893)
- Jack Wright And His Electric Exploring Ship (1893)
- Jack Wright And His Electric Man-of-War (1893)
- Jack Wright And His Submarine Torpedo-Tug (1893)
- Jack Wright And His Electric Sea-Demon (1893)
- Jack Wright And His Electric 'Whale' (1893)
- Jack Wright And His Electric Marine 'Rover' (1893)
- Jack Wright And His Electric Deep Sea Cutter (1893)
- Jack Wright And His Electric Monarch Of The Ocean (1893)
- Jack Wright And His Electric Devil-Fish (1893)
- Jack Wright And His Electric Demon Of The Plains (1893)
- Jack Wright And His Electric Balloon Ship (1893)
- Jack Wright And His Electric Locomotive (1893)
- Jack Wright And His Iron-clad Air-Motor (1893)
- Jack Wright And His Electric Tricycle (1893)
- Jack Wright And His Electric Dynamo Boat (1893)
- Jack Wright And His Flying Torpedo (1893)
- Jack Wright And His Prairie Privateer (1893)
- Jack Wright And His Naval Cruiser (1893)
- Jack Wright, The Boy Inventor, And His Whaleback Privateer (1893)
- Jack Wright And His Electric Phantom Boat (1893)
- Jack Wright And His Winged Gunboat (1894)
- Jack Wright And His Electric Flyer (1894)
- Jack Wright, The Boy Inventor's Electric Sledge Boat (1894)
- Jack Wright And His Electric Express Wagon (1894)
- Jack Wright And His Submarine Explorer (1894)
- Jack Wright And His Demon Of The Air (1894)
- Jack Wright And His Electric Ripper (1894)
- Jack Wright And His King Of The Sea (1894)
- Jack Wright And His Electric Balloons (1894)
- Jack Wright And His Imp Of The Ocean (1894)
- Jack Wright And His Electric Cab (1894)
- Jack Wright And His Flying Phantom (1894)
- Jack Wright And His Submarine Warship (1894)
- Jack Wright And His Prairie Yacht (1894)
- Jack Wright And His Electric Air Rocket (1894)
- Jack Wright And His Submarine Destroyer (1894)
- Jack Wright And His Electric Battery Diver (1894)
- "Jack Wright And His Electric Stage". 1894.
- Jack Wright And His Wheel Of The Wind (1894)
- Jack Wright And The Head-Hunters Of The African Coast (1894)
- Jack Wright And The Wild Boy Of The Woods (1894)
- Jack Wright Among The Demons Of The Ocean (1894)
- Jack Wright, The Wizard Of Wrightstown And His Electric Dragon (1894)
- Jack Wright's Electric Land-Clipper (1894)
- Jack Wright, The Boy Inventor, And His Phantom Frigate (1895)
- Jack Wright And His Air-Ship On Wheels (1895)
- Jack Wright And His Electric Roadster In The Desert Of Death (1895)
- Jack Wright's Ocean Marvel (1895)
- Jack Wright And His Electric Soaring Machine (1895)
- Jack Wright And His Electric Battery Car (1895)
- Jack Wright And His Electric Sea Horse (1895)
- Jack Wright And His Electric Balloon Boat (1895)
- Jack Wright, The Boy Inventor, Working For The Union Pacific (1895)
- Jack Wright And His Electric Air Monitor (1895)
- Jack Wright And His Electric Submarine Ranger (1895)
- Jack Wright And Frank Reade, Jr. (1896)
- Jack Wright, The Boy Inventor, And The Smugglers (1896)
- Jack Wright And His New Electric Horse (1896)

== Bibliography ==
- Aldine Cheerful Library Vol. 3 No. 27, 1895, "Jack Wright's Dandy of the Deep" by anonymous (Luis Senarens).
- Aldine Cheerful Library Vol. 3 No. 29, 1895, "Jack Wright's Electric Gunboat" by anonymous (Luis Senarens).
- Aldine Cheerful Library Vol. 3 No. 31, 1895, "Jack Wright's Ocean Sleuth-Hound" by anonymous (Luis Senarens).
- Aldine Cheerful Library Vol. 3 No. 33, 1895, "Jack Wright's Electric Sea Launch" by anonymous (Luis Senarens).
- Aldine Cheerful Library Vol. 3 No. 35, 1895, "Jack Wright's Electric Torpedo Ram" by anonymous (Luis Senarens).
- Aldine Cheerful Library Vol. 3 No. 37, 1895, "Jack Wright's Magnetic Hurricane: Exploring Central Asia" by anonymous (Luis Senarens).
- Aldine Cheerful Library Vol. 3 No. 39, 1895, "Jack Wright's Search for Captain Kidd's Gold" by anonymous (Luis Senarens).
- Aldine Romance of Invention, Travel & Adventure Library No. 170, "Jack Wright's Electric Sea Demon" by anonymous (Luis Senarens).
- Aldine Romance of Invention, Travel & Adventure Library No. 174, "Jack Wright's Trip to the Land of Gold" by anonymous (Luis Senarens).
- Aldine Romance of Invention, Travel & Adventure Library No. 206, "Jack Wright's Submarine Catamaran; or, The Phantom Ship of the Yellow Sea" by anonymous (Luis Senarens).
- Aldine Romance of Invention, Travel & Adventure Library No. 214, "Jack Wright's Electric Canoe in the Revenue Service" by anonymous (Luis Senarens).
- Aldine Romance of Invention, Travel & Adventure Library No. 222, "The 'Sky Rocket', Or, Jack Wright's Cruise to Ceylon in His Electric Air-Schooner" by anonymous (Luis Senarens).
- Aldine Romance of Invention, Travel & Adventure Library No. 225, "Jack Wright's Electric Sea Launch, or, A Desperate Cruise for Life" by anonymous (Luis Senarens).
- Aldine Romance of Invention, Travel & Adventure Library No. 230, "Jack Wright's Dandy of the Deep, or, Driven Afloat in the Sea of Fire" by anonymous (Luis Senarens).
- Aldine Romance of Invention, Travel & Adventure Library No. 233, "Jack Wright's Electric Torpedo Ram; or, The Sunken City of the Atlantic" by anonymous (Luis Senarens).
- Aldine Romance of Invention, Travel & Adventure Library No. 237, 1903, "Jack Wright's Search for Captain Kidd's Gold" by anonymous (Luis Senarens).
- Aldine Romance of Invention, Travel & Adventure Library No. 238, 1903, "Jack Wright's Electric Torpedo Ram; or, The Sunken City of the Atlantic" by anonymous (Luis Senarens).
- Aldine Romance of Invention, Travel & Adventure Library No. 241, "Jack Wright, and His Electric 'Sea-Ghost;' or, A Strange Under-water Journey" by anonymous (Luis Senarens).
- Aldine Romance of Invention, Travel & Adventure Library No. 242, "Jack Wright's Under-water Wrecking Raft; or, The Mystery of a Scuttled Ship" by anonymous (Luis Senarens).
- Aldine Romance of Invention, Travel & Adventure Library No. 245, "Jack Wright's Wheel of the Wind; or, The Jewels of the Volcano-Dwellers" by anonymous (Luis Senarens).
- Aldine Romance of Invention, Travel & Adventure Library No. 257, 1904, "Jack Wright's Electric Roadster in the Desert of Death" by anonymous (Luis Senarens).
- Aldine Romance of Invention, Travel & Adventure Library No. 261, 1904, "Jack Wright's 3,000 Pounds of Gold" by anonymous (Luis Senarens).
- Aldine Romance of Invention, Travel & Adventure Library No. 262, 1904, "Jack Wright and the Loss of the 'Gipsy Queen'" by anonymous (Luis Senarens).
- Aldine Romance of Invention, Travel & Adventure Library No. 265, 1905, "Jack Wright's Flying Phantom; or, Saved from the Scaffold" by anonymous (Luis Senarens?)
- Boys of New York, The No. 888, 1892, part 1, serialized "Jack Wright, the Boy Inventor and the Smugglers of the Border Lakes; or, The Second Cruise of the Whaleback 'Comet'" by "Noname" (Luis Senerens).
- Boys of New York, The No. 906, 1893, part 1, serialized "Jack Wright, the Boy Inventor, and His Phantom Frigate; or, Fighting the Coast Wreckers of the Gulf" by "Noname" (Luis Senerens).
- Boys of New York, The No. 940, 1893, part 1, serialized "Jack Wright, the Boy Inventor, Working for the Union Pacific Railroad; or, Over the Continent on the 'Electric'" by "Noname" (Luis Senerens).
- Boys of New York, The No. 967, 1893, part 1, serialized "Jack Wright and His Electric Air Monitor; or, The Scourge of the Pacific" by "Noname" (Luis Senerens).
- Boys' Star Library, The No. 216, July 18, 1891, "Jack Wright, the Boy Inventor; or, Hunting for a Sunken Treasure" by "Noname" (Luis Senerens).
- Boys' Star Library, The No. 220, August 15, 1891, "Jack Wright and His Electric Turtle; or Chasing the Pirates of the Spanish Main" by "Noname" (Luis Senerens).
- Boys' Star Library, The No. 223, September 12, 1891, "Jack Wright's Submarine Catamaran; or, the Phantom Ship of the Yellow Sea" by "Noname" (Luis Senerens).
- Boys' Star Library, The No. 227, October 17, 1891, "Jack Wright and His Ocean Racer; or, Around the World in Twenty Days" by "Noname" (Luis Senerens).
- Boys' Star Library, The No. 229, October 31, 1891, "Jack Wright and His Electric Canoe; or, Working in the Revenue Service" by "Noname" (Luis Senerens).
- Boys' Star Library, The No. 231, November 14, 1891, "Jack Wright's Air and Water Cutter; or, Wonderful Adventures on the Wing and Afloat" by "Noname" (Luis Senerens).
- Boys' Star Library, The No. 235, December 12, 1891, "Jack Wright and His Magnetic Motor; or, The Golden City of the Sierras" by "Noname" (Luis Senerens).
- Boys' Star Library, The No. 238, January 2, 1892, "Jack Wright, the Boy Inventor, and His Under-Water Iron-Clad; or, The Treasure of the Sandy Sea" by "Noname" (Luis Senerens).
- Boys' Star Library, The No. 241, January 23, 1892, "Jack Wright and His Electric Deers; or, Fighting the Bandits of the Black Hills" by "Noname" (Luis Senerens).
- Boys' Star Library, The No. 246, February 27, 1892, "Jack Wright and His Prairie Engine; or, Among the Bushmen of Australia" by "Noname" (Luis Senerens).
- Boys' Star Library, The No. 253, April 16, 1892, "Jack Wright and His Electric Air Schooner; or, The Mystery of a Magic Mine" by "Noname" (Luis Senerens).
- Boys' Star Library, The No. 257, May 7, 1892, "Jack Wright and His Electric Sea-Motor; or, The Search for a Drifting Wreck" by "Noname" (Luis Senerens).
- Boys' Star Library, The No. 262, June 18, 1892, "Jack Wright and His Ocean Sleuth-Hound; or, Tracking an Under Water Treasure" by "Noname" (Luis Senerens).
- Boys' Star Library, The No. 266, July 16, 1892, "Jack Wright and His Dandy of the deep; or, Driven Afloat in the Sea of Fire" by "Noname" (Luis Senerens).
- Boys' Star Library, The No. 271, August 20, 1892, "Jack Wright and His Electric Torpedo Ramo; or, The Sunken City of the Atlantic" by "Noname" (Luis Senerens).
- Boys' Star Library, The No. 272, September 3, 1892, "Jack Wright and His Deep-Sea Monitor; or, Searching for a Ton of Gold" by "Noname" (Luis Senerens).
- Boys' Star Library, The No. 275, September 24, 1892, "Jack Wright, The Boy Inventor, Exploring Central Asia in His Magnetic Hurricane" by "Noname" (Luis Senerens).
- Boys' Star Library, The No. 276, October 1, 1892, "Jack Wright and His Ocean Plunger; or, The Harpoon Hunters of the Arctic" by "Noname" (Luis Senerens).
- Boys' Star Library, The No. 277, October 8, 1892, "Jack Wright, and His Electric 'Sea-Ghost;' or, A Strange Under-water Journey" by "Noname" (Luis Senerens).
- Boys' Star Library, The No. 279, October 22, 1892, "Jack Wright, the Boy Inventor, and His Deep Sea Diving Bell; or, The Buccaneers of the Gold Coast" by "Noname" (Luis Senerens).
- Boys' Star Library, The No. 281, November 5, 1892, "Jack Wright, the Boy Inventor, and His Electric Tricycle Boat; or, The Treasure of the Sun-Worshippers" by "Noname" (Luis Senerens).
- Boys' Star Library, The No. 283, November 19, 1892, "Jack Wright and His Under-Water Wrecking Raft; or, The Mystery of a Scuttled Ship" by "Noname" (Luis Senerens).
- Boys' Star Library, The No. 285, December 3, 1892, "Jack Wright and His Terror of the Sea; or, Fighting for a Sunken Fortune" by "Noname" (Luis Senerens).
- Boys' Star Library, The No. 287, December 17, 1892, "Jack Wright and His Electric Diving Boat; or, Lost Under the Ocean" by "Noname" (Luis Senerens).
- Boys' Star Library, The No. 289, December 31, 1892, "Jack Wright and His Submarine Yacht; or, The Fortune Hunters of the Red Sea" by "Noname" (Luis Senerens).
- Boys' Star Library, The No. 292, January 21, 1893, "Jack Wright and His Electric Gunboat; or, The Search for a Frozen Girl" by "Noname" (Luis Senerens).
- Boys' Star Library, The No. 294, February 4, 1893, "Jack Wright and His Electric Sea Launch; or, A Desperate Cruise for Life" by "Noname" (Luis Senerens).
- Boys' Star Library, The No. 296, February 18, 1893, "Jack Wright and His Electric Bicycle Boat; or, Searching for Captain Kidd's Gold" by "Noname" (Luis Senerens).
- Boys' Star Library, The No. 298, March 4, 1893, "Jack Wright and His Electric Side-Wheel Boat; or, Fighting the Brigands of the Coral Isles" by "Noname" (Luis Senerens).
- Boys' Star Library, The No. 300, March 18, 1893, "Jack Wright's Wonder of the Waves; or, The Flying Dutchman of the Pacific" by "Noname" (Luis Senerens).
- Boys' Star Library, The No. 302, April 1, 1893, "Jack Wright and His Electric Exploring Ship; or, A Cruise Around Greenland" by "Noname" (Luis Senerens).
- Boys' Star Library, The No. 304, April 15, 1893, "Jack Wright and His Man-of-War; or, Fighting the Sea robbers of the Frozen Coast" by "Noname" (Luis Senerens).
- Boys' Star Library, The No. 306, April 29, 1893, "Jack Wright and His Submarine Torpedo-Tug; or, Winning a Government Reward" by "Noname" (Luis Senerens).
- Boys' Star Library, The No. 308, May 13, 1893, "Jack Wright and His Electric Sea-Demon; or, Daring Adventures under the Ocean" by "Noname" (Luis Senerens).
- Boys' Star Library, The No. 310, May 27, 1893, "Jack Wright and His 'Whale;' or, The Treasure Trove of the Polar Sea" by "Noname" (Luis Senerens).
- Boys' Star Library, The No. 311, June 3, 1893, "Jack Wright and His Electric Marine 'Rover'; or, 50,000 Miles in Ocean Perils" by "Noname" (Luis Senerens).
- Boys' Star Library, The No. 312, June 10, 1893, "Jack Wright and His Electric Deep Sea Cutter; or, Searching for a Pirate's Treasure" by "Noname" (Luis Senerens).
- Boys' Star Library, The No. 314, July 14, 1893, "Jack Wright and His Electric Monarch of the Ocean; or, Cruising for a Million in Gold" by "Noname" (Luis Senerens).
- Boys' Star Library, The No. 315, July 28, 1893, "Jack Wright and His Electric Devil-Fish; or, Fighting the Smugglers of Alaska" by "Noname" (Luis Senerens).
- Boys' Star Library, The No. 316, August 11, 1893, "Jack Wright and His Electric Demon of the Plains; or, Wild Adventures Among the Cowboys" by "Noname" (Luis Senerens).
- Boys' Star Library, The No. 317, August 25, 1893, "Jack Wright and His Electric Locomotive; or, The Lost Mine of Death Valley" by "Noname" (Luis Senerens).
- Boys' Star Library, The No. 318, September 8, 1893, "Jack Wright and His Electric Locomotive; or, The Lost Mine of Death Valley" by "Noname" (Luis Senerens).
- Boys' Star Library, The No. 319, September 22, 1893, "Jack Wright and His Iron-Clad Air-Motor; or, Searching for a Lost Explorer" by "Noname" (Luis Senerens).
- Boys' Star Library, The No. 320, October 6, 1893, "Jack Wright and His Electric Tricycle; or, Fighting the Stranglers of the Crimson Desert" by "Noname" (Luis Senerens).
- Boys' Star Library, The No. 321, October 20, 1893, "Jack Wright and His Electric Dynamo Boat; or, The Mystery of a Buried Sea" by "Noname" (Luis Senerens).
- Boys' Star Library, The No. 322, November 3, 1893, "Jack Wright and His Flying Torpedo; or, The Black Demons of Dismal Swamp" by "Noname" (Luis Senerens).
- Boys' Star Library, The No. 323, November 17, 1893, "Jack Wright and His Prairie Privateer; or, Fighting the Western Road-Agents" by "Noname" (Luis Senerens).
- Boys' Star Library, The No. 324, December 1, 1893, "Jack Wright and His Naval Cruiser; or, Fighting the Pirates of the Pacific" by "Noname" (Luis Senerens).
- Boys' Star Library, The No. 325, December 15, 1893, "Jack Wright, the Boy Inventor and His Whaleback Privateer; or, Cruising in the Behring Sea" by "Noname" (Luis Senerens).
- Boys' Star Library, The No. 326, December 29, 1893, "Jack Wright and His Electric Phantom Boat; or, Chasing the Outlaws of the Ocean" by "Noname" (Luis Senerens).
- Boys' Star Library, The No. 327, January 12, 1894, "Jack Wright and His Winged Gunboat; or, A Voyage to an Unknown Land" by "Noname" (Luis Senerens).
- Boys' Star Library, The No. 328, January 26, 1894, "ack Wright and His Electric Flyer; or, Racing in the Clouds for a Boy's Life" by "Noname" (Luis Senerens).
- Boys' Star Library, The No. 329, February 9, 1894, "Jack Wright, the Boy Inventor's Electric Sledge Boat; or, Wild Adventures in Alaska" by "Noname" (Luis Senerens).
- Boys' Star Library, The No. 330, March 23, 1894, "Jack Wright and His Electric Express Wagon; or, Wiping Out the Outlaws of Deadwood" by "Noname" (Luis Senerens).
- Boys' Star Library, The No. 331, March 9, 1894, "Jack Wright and His Submarine Explorer; or, A Cruise at the Bottom of the Ocean" by "Noname" (Luis Senerens).
- Boys' Star Library, The No. 332, March 23, 1894, "Jack Wright and His Demon of the Air; or, A Perilous Trip in the Clouds" by "Noname" (Luis Senerens).
- Boys' Star Library, The No. 333, April 6, 1894, "Jack Wright and His Electric Ripper; or, Searching for Treasure in the Jungle" by "Noname" (Luis Senerens).
- Boys' Star Library, The No. 334, April 20, 1894, "Jack Wright and His King of the Sea" or, Diving for Old Spanish Gold" by "Noname" (Luis Senerens).
- Boys' Star Library, The No. 335, May 4, 1894, "Jack Wright and His Electric Balloons; or, Cruising in the Clouds for a Mountain Treasure" by "Noname" (Luis Senerens).
- Boys' Star Library, The No. 336, May 18, 1894, "Jack Wright and His Imp of the Ocean; or, The Wreckers of Whirlpool Reef" or, Diving for Old Spanish Gold" by "Noname" (Luis Senerens).
- Boys' Star Library, The No. 337, June 8, 1894, "Jack Wright and His Electric Cab; or, Around the Globe on Wheels" by "Noname" (Luis Senerens).
- Boys' Star Library, The No. 338, June 22, 1894, "Jack Wright and His Flying Phantom; or, Searching for a Lost Balloonist" by "Noname" (Luis Senerens).
- Boys' Star Library, The No. 339, July 6, 1894, "Jack Wright and His Submarine Warship; or, Chasing the Demons of the Sea of Gold" or, Diving for Old Spanish Gold" by "Noname" (Luis Senerens).
- Boys' Star Library, The No. 340, July 20, 1894, "Jack Wright and his Prairie Yacht; or, Fighting the Indians in the Sea of Grass" by "Noname" (Luis Senerens).
- Boys' Star Library, The No. 341, August 3, 1894, "Jack Wright and His Electric Air Rocket" by "Noname" (Luis Senerens).
- Boys' Star Library, The No. 342, August 17, 1894, "Jack Wright and His Submarine Destroyer; or, Warring against Japanese Pirates" by "Noname" (Luis Senerens).
- Boys' Star Library, The No. 343, August 31, 1894, "Jack Wright and His Electric Battery Diver; or, A Two Month's Cruise under Water" by "Noname" (Luis Senerens).
- Boys' Star Library, The No. 344, September 14, 1894, "Jack Wright and His Electric Stage; or, Leagued against the James Boys" by "Noname" (Luis Senerens).
- Boys' Star Library, The No. 345, September 28, 1894, "Jack Wright and His Wheel of the Wind; or, The Jewels of the Volcano Dwellers" by "Noname" (Luis Senerens).
- Boys' Star Library, The No. 346, October 12, 1894, "Jack Wright and the Head Hunters of the African Coast; or, The Electric Pirate Chaser" by "Noname" (Luis Senerens).
- Boys' Star Library, The No. 347, October 26, 1894, "3,000 Pounds of Gold; or, Jack Wright and His Electric Bat Fighting the Cliff Dwellers of the Sierras" by "Noname" (Luis Senerens).
- Boys' Star Library, The No. 348, November 9, 1894, "Jack Wright and the Wild Boy of the Woods; or, Exposing a Mystery with the Electric Cart" by "Noname" (Luis Senerens).
- Boys' Star Library, The No. 349, November 23, 1894, "Jack Wright among the Demons of the Ocean with His Electric See Fighter" by "Noname" (Luis Senerens).
- Boys' Star Library, The No. 350, December 7, 1894, "Jack Wright, the Wizard of Wrightstown, and His Electric Dragon; or, A Wild Race to Save a Fortune" by "Noname" (Luis Senerens).
- Boys' Star Library, The No. 351, December 21, 1894, "Jack Wright's Electric Land Clipper; or, Exploring the Mysterious Gobi Desert" by "Noname" (Luis Senerens).
- Boys' Star Library, The No. 352, January 4, 1895, "Skull and Crossbone; or, Jack Wright's Diving Bell and the Pirates" by "Noname" (Luis Senerens).
- Boys' Star Library, The No. 353, January 18, 1895, "Jack Wright, the Boy Inventor, and His Phantom Frigate; or, Fighting the Coast Wreckers of the Gulf" by "Noname" (Luis Senerens).
- Boys' Star Library, The No. 354, February 1, 1895, "Jack Wright and His Airship on Wheels; or, A Perilous Journey to Cape Farewell" by "Noname" (Luis Senerens).
- Boys' Star Library, The No. 355, February 15, 1895, "Jack Wright and His Electric Roadster in the Desert of Death; or, Chasing the Australian Brigands" by "Noname" (Luis Senerens).
- Boys' Star Library, The No. 356, March 6, 1895, "Jack Wright's Ocean Marvel; or, The Mystery of a Frozen Island" by "Noname" (Luis Senerens).
- Boys' Star Library, The No. 357, March 15, 1895, "Jack Wright and His Electric Soaring Machine; or, A Daring Flight Through Miles of Peril" by "Noname" (Luis Senerens).
- Boys' Star Library, The No. 358, March 29, 1895, "Jack Wright and His Electric Battery Car; or, Beating the Express and Train Robbers" by "Noname" (Luis Senerens).
- Boys' Star Library, The No. 359, April 12, 1895, "Jack Wright and His Electric Sea Horse; or, Seven Weeks in Ocean Perils" by "Noname" (Luis Senerens).
- Boys' Star Library, The No. 360, April 26, 1895, "Jack Wright and His Electric Balloon Boat; or, A Dangerous Voyage above the Clouds" by "Noname" (Luis Senerens).
- Boys' Star Library, The No. 361, May, 1895, "In the Jungle of India; or, Jack Wright as a Wild Animal Hunter" by "Noname" (Luis Senerens).
- Boys' Star Library, The No. 362, June 1895, "50,000 League under the Sea; or, Jack Wright's Most Dangerous Voyage" by "Noname" (Luis Senerens).
- Boys' Star Library, The No. 363, July 1895, " Jack Wright, the Boy Inventor, Working for the Union Pacific Railroad; or, Over the Continent on the 'Electric'" by "Noname" (Luis Senerens).
- Boys' Star Library, The No. 364, August 1895, "Over the South Pole; or, Jack Wright's Search for a Lost Explorer with His Flying Boat" by "Noname" (Luis Senerens).
- Boys' Star Library, The No. 365, September 1895, "Jack Wright and His Electric Air Monitor; or, The Scourge of the Pacific" by "Noname" (Luis Senerens).
- Boys' Star Library, The No. 366, October 1895, "The Boy Lion Fighter; or, Jack Wright in the Swamps of Africa" by "Noname" (Luis Senerens).
- Boys' Star Library, The No. 367, November 1895, "Jack Wright and His Electric Submarine Ranger; or, Afloat among the Cannibals of the Deep" by "Noname" (Luis Senerens).
- Boys' Star Library, The No. 368, December 27, 1895, "The Demon of the Sky; or, Jack Wright's $10,000 Wager" by "Noname" (Luis Senerens).
- Boys' Star Library, The No. 369, January 3, 1896, "Adrift in the Land of Snow; or, Jack Wright and His Sledge Boat on Wheels" by "Noname" (Luis Senerens).
- Boys' Star Library, The No. 370, January 17, 1896, "The Floating Terror; or, Jack Wright Fighting the Buccaneers of the Venezuelan Coast" by "Noname" (Luis Senerens).
- Boys' Star Library, The No. 371, January 31, 1896, "Lost in the Polar Circle; or, Jack Wright and His Aerial Explorer" by "Noname" (Luis Senerens).
- Boys' Star Library, The No. 372, February 14, 1896, "Adrift in the Land of Snow; or, Jack Wright and His Sledge Boat on Wheels" by "Noname" (Luis Senerens).
- Boys' Star Library, The No. 373, February 28, 1896, "The Fatal Blue Diamond; or, Jack Wright among the Demon Worshipers with His Electric Motor" by "Noname" (Luis Senerens).
- Boys' Star Library, The No. 374, March 13, 1896, "Running the Blockade; or, Jack Wright Helping the Cuban Filibusters" by "Noname" (Luis Senerens).
- Boys' Star Library, The No. 375, March 27, 1896, "Jack Wright and Frank Reade, Jr., the Two Young Inventors; or, Brains against Brains. A Thrilling Story of a Race around the World for $10,000" by "Noname" (Luis Senerens).
- Boys' Star Library, The No. 376, April 10, 1896, "The Flying Avenger; or, Jack Wright Fighting for Cuba" by "Noname" (Luis Senerens).
- Boys' Star Library, The No. 377, April 24, 1896, "Jack Wright and His New Electric Horse; or, His Perilous Trip over Two Continents" by "Noname" (Luis Senerens).
- Boys' Star Library, The No. 378, May 8, 1896, "Jack Wright Fighting the Slave Hunters" by "Noname" (Luis Senerens).
- Boys' Star Library, The No. 379, May 22, 1896, "Driving for a Million; or, Jack Wright and His Electric Ocean Liner" by "Noname" (Luis Senerens).
- Golden Weekly Vol. III No. 104, November 5, 1891, serialized, "Jack Wright and His Deep Sea Monitor" by "Noname" (Luis Senarens).
- Golden Weekly Vol. III No. 142, serialized, "Jack Wright the Boy Inventor and the Smugglers of the Border Lakes; or, The Second Cruise of the Whaleback 'Comet'" by "Noname (Luis Senarens).
- Happy Days Vol. I No. 1, October 20, 1894, part 1, serialized, "Jack Wright, and Frank Reade, Jr., the Two Young Inventors; or, Daring Against Brains. A Thrilling Story of a Race Around the World for $10,000" by "Noname" (Luis Senarens).
- Happy Days Vol. II No. 27, April 20, 1895, part 1, serialized, "Jack Wright and His New Electric Horse; or, A Perilous Trip Over Two Continents" by "Noname" (Luis Senarens)
- Happy Days Vol. IV No. 103, October 3 through November 21, 1896, serialized, "Wrecked at the Pole; or, Jack Wright's Daring Adventures in the Frozen Sea" by "Noname" (Francis W. Doughty).
- Happy Days Vol. XVI No. 406, July 26, 1902, part 1, serialized, "Jack Wright and His Ship of the Desert or, Adventures in the Sea of Sand" Part I, by "Noname" (Luis Senerens).
- Happy Days Vol. XVI No. 409, August 16, 1902, part 1, serialized, "Jack Wright and His King of the Clouds or, Around the World on Wings" Part I by "Noname" (Luis Senerens).
- Happy Days Vol. XVII No. 420, November 1, 1902, part 1, serialized, "Jack Wright and His Red Terror; or, Fighting the Bushmen of Australia" Part I by "Noname" (Luis Senerens).
- Happy Days Vol. XVII No. 424, November 29, 1902, part 1, serialized, "Jack Wright and His Tandem Balloons or, Hunting Wild Beasts in India" Part I by "Noname" (Luis Senerens).
- Happy Days Vol. XVII No. 430, January 10, 1903, part 1, serialized, "Jack Wright and His 'Queen of the Deep' or, Exploring Submarine Caves" Part I by "Noname" (Luis Senarens).
- Happy Days Vol. XVII No. 441, March 28, 1903, part 1, serialized, "Jack Wright and His Flying Ice Boat or, Adrift in the Polar Regions" Part I, by "Noname" (Luis Senarens).
- Happy Days Vol. XVIII No. 445, April 25, 1903, part 1, serialized, "Jack Wright's Floating 'Terror' or, Fighting the Pirates" Part I by "Noname" (Luis Senarens).
- Happy Days Vol. XVIII No. 449, May 23, 1903, part 1, serialized, "Jack Wright's Electric Prairie Car or, Hot Times With the Broncho Busters" Part I, by "Noname" (Luis Senarens).
- Happy Days Vol. XVIII No. 453, June 20, 1903, part 1, serialized, "Jack Wright's Sky-Scraper or, After the Lost Balloonists" Part I by "Noname" (Luis Senarens).
- Happy Days Vol. XVIII No. 457, July 18, 1903, part 1, serialized, "Jack Wright's Sea Demon or, Running the Blockade" by "Noname" (Luis Senarens).
- Happy Days Vol. XXI No. 529, December 3, 1904, part 1, serialized, "Jack Wright's King of the Plains or, Calling Down the Cowboys" by "Noname" (Luis Senarens).
- Happy Days Vol. XLI No. 1044, October 17, 1914, part 1, serialized, "Jack Wright's Sky-Scraper or, After the Lost Balloonists" by "Noname" (Luis Senarens).
- Happy Days Vol. XLII No. 1084, July 24, 1915, part 1, serialized, "Jack Wright's Sky-Demon or, Running the Blockade" by "Noname" (Luis Senarens).
- Pluck and Luck No. 139, January 20, 1901, "Jack Wright and His Deep Sea Monitor; or, Searching for a Ton of Gold" by "Noname" (Luis Senarens).
- Pluck and Luck No. 166, August 7, 1901, "Jack Wright the Boy Inventor Exploring Central Asia in His Magnetic Hurricane" by "Noname" (Luis Senarens).
- Pluck and Luck No. 187, January 1, 1902, "Jack Wright the Boy Inventor; or, Hunting for a Sunken Treasure" by "Noname" (Luis Senarens).
- Pluck and Luck No. 193, February 12, 1902, "Jack Wright and His Electric Turtle; or Chasing the Pirates of the Spanish Main" by "Noname" (Luis Senarens).
- Pluck and Luck No. 197, March 12, 1902, "Jack Wright's Submarine Catamaran; or, The Phantom Ship of the Yellow Sea" by "Noname" (Luis Senarens).
- Pluck and Luck No. 202, April 16, 1902, "Jack Wright and His Ocean Racer; or, Around the World in 20 Days" by "Noname" (Luis Senarens).
- Pluck and Luck No. 206, May 14, 1902, "Jack Wright and His Electric Canoe; or, Working in the Revenue Service" by "Noname" (Luis Senarens).
- Pluck and Luck No. 210, June 11, 1902, "Jack Wright's Air and Water Cutter; or, Wonderful Adventures on the Wing and Afloat" by "Noname" (Luis Senarens).
- Pluck and Luck No. 214, July 9, 1902, "Jack Wright and His Magnetic Motor; or, The Golden City of the Sierras" by "Noname" (Luis Senarens).
- Pluck and Luck No. 218, August 6, 1902, "Jack Wright, the Boy Inventor, and His Under-Water Ironclad; or, The Treasure of the Sandy Sea" by "Noname" (Luis Senarens).
- Pluck and Luck No. 222, September 3, 1902, "Jack Wright and His Electric Deers; or, Fighting the Bandits of the Black Hills" by "Noname" (Luis Senerens).
- Pluck and Luck No. 226, October 1, 1902, "Jack Wright and His Prairie Engine; or, Among the Bushmen of Australia" by "Noname" (Luis Senarens).
- Pluck and Luck No. 231, November 5, 1902, "Jack Wright and his Electric Air Schooner; or, The Mystery of a Magic Mine" by "Noname" (Luis Senarens).
- Pluck and Luck No. 237, December 31, 1902, "Jack Wright and His Electric Motor; or, Searching for a Drifting Wreck" by "Noname" (Luis Senerens).
- Pluck and Luck No. 242, February 4, 1903, "Jack Wright and His Ocean Sleuth-Hound; or, Tracking an Under-Water Treasure" by "Noname" (Luis Senarens).
- Pluck and Luck No. 245, February 25, 1903, "Jack Wright and His Electric Locomotive; or, The Lost Mine of Death Valley" by "Noname" (Luis Senarens).
- Pluck and Luck No. 250, March 18, 1903, "Jack Wright and His Electric Balloon Ship; or, 30,000 Leagues Above the Earth" by "Noname" (Luis Senarens).
- Pluck and Luck No. 254, April 15, 1903, "Jack Wright and His Dandy of the Deep; or, Driven Afloat in the Sea of Fire" by "Noname" (Luis Senarens).
- Pluck and Luck No. 258, May 13, 1903, "Jack Wright and His Electric Demon of the Plains; or, Wild Adventures among the Cowboys" by "Noname" (Luis Senarens).
- Pluck and Luck No. 262, June 10, 1903, "Jack Wright and His Electric Torpedo Ram; or, The Sunken City of the Atlantic" by "Noname" (Luis Senarens).
- Pluck and Luck No. 266, July 8, 1903, "Jack Wright and His Iron Clad Air-Motor; or, Searching for a Lost Explorer" by "Noname" (Luis Senarens).
- Pluck and Luck No. 270, August 5, 1903, "Jack Wright and His Electric Tricycle; or, Fighting the Stranglers of the Crimson Desert" by "Noname" (Luis Senarens).
- Pluck and Luck No. 274, September 2, 1903, "Jack Wright and His Ocean Plunger; or, The Harpoon Hunters of the Arctic" by "Noname" (Luis Senarens).
- Pluck and Luck No. 278, September 30, 1903, "Jack Wright's Flying Torpedo; or, The Black Demons of Dismal Swamp" by "Noname" (Luis Senarens).
- Pluck and Luck No. 282, October 28, 1903, "Jack Wright and His Electric Sea Ghost; or, A Strange Under-Water Journey" by "Noname" (Luis Senarens).
- Pluck and Luck No. 942, May 31, 1916 Jack Wright and His Deep Sea Monitor; or, Searching for a Ton of Gold
- Pluck and Luck No. 968, November 29, 1916, "Jack Wright, the Boy Inventor Exploring Central Asia in His Magnetic Hurricane" by "Noname" (Luis Senarens).
- Pluck and Luck No. 988, April 18, 1917, "Jack Wright, the Boy Inventor; or, Hunting for a Sunken Treasure"" by "Noname" (Luis Senarens).
- Pluck and Luck No. 994, June 20, 1917, "Jack Wright and his Electric Turtle; or, Chasing the Pirates of the Spanish Main" by "Noname" (Luis Senarens).
- Pluck and Luck No. 998, July 18, 1917, "Jack Wright's Submarine Catamaran; or, The Phantom Ship of the Yellow Sea" by "Noname" (Luis Senarens).
- Pluck and Luck No. 1003, August 22, 1917, "Jack Wright and His Ocean Racer; or, Around the World in Twenty Days" by "Noname" (Luis Senarens).
- Pluck and Luck No. 1007, September 19, 1917, "Jack Wright and His Electric Canoe; or, Working in the Revenue Service" by "Noname" (Luis Senarens).
- Pluck and Luck No. 1011, October 17, 1917, "Jack Wright's Air and Water Cutter; or, Wonderful Adventures on the Wing and Afloat" by "Noname" (Luis Senarens).
- Pluck and Luck No. 1015, November 14, 1917, "Jack Wright and His Magnetic Motor; or, The Golden City of the Sierras" by "Noname" (Luis Senarens).
- Pluck and Luck No. 1019, December 12, 1917, "Jack Wright, the Boy Inventor and His Under-Water Iron-clad; or, the Treasure of the Sandy Sea" by "Noname" (Luis Senarens).
- Pluck and Luck No. 1023, January 9, 1918, "Jack Wright and His Electric Deers; or, Fighting the Bandits of the Black Hills" by "Noname" (Luis Senerens).
- Pluck and Luck No. 1027, February 6, 1918, "Jack Wright and his Prairie Engine; or, Among the Bushmen of Australia" by "Noname" (Luis Senerens).
- Pluck and Luck No. 1032, March 13, 1918, "Jack Wright and His Electric Air Schooner; or, The Mystery of a Magic Mine" by "Noname" (Luis Senerens).
- Pluck and Luck No. 1038, April 24, 1918, "Jack Wright and His Electric Sea-Motor; or, The Search for a Drifting Wreck" by "Noname" (Luis Senerens).
- Pluck and Luck No. 1043, May 29, 1918, "Jack Wright and His Ocean Sleuth-Hound; or, Tracing an Under Water Treasure" by "Noname" (Luis Senerens).
- Pluck and Luck No. 1046, June 19, 1918, "Jack Wright and His Electric Locomotive; or, The Lost Mine of Death Valley" by "Noname" (Luis Senerens).
- Pluck and Luck No. 1051, July 24, 1918, "Jack Wright and His Electric Balloon Ship; or, 30,000 Leagues Above the Earth" by "Noname" (Luis Senerens).
- Pluck and Luck No. 1055, August 21, 1918, "Jack Wright and his Dandy of the Deep; or, Driven Afloat in the Sea of Fire" by "Noname" (Luis Senerens).
- Pluck and Luck No. 1059, September 18, 1918, "Jack Wright and His Electric Demon of the Plains; or, Wild Adventures among the Cowboys" by "Noname" (Luis Senerens).
- Pluck and Luck No. 1063, October 16, 1918, "Jack Wright and His Electric Torpedo Ram; or, The Sunken City of the Atlantic" by "Noname" (Luis Senarens).
- Pluck and Luck No. 1067, November 13, 1918, "Jack Wright and His Iron Clad Air-Motor; or, Searching for a Lost Explorer" by "Noname" (Luis Senarens).
- Pluck and Luck No. 1071, December 11, 1918, "Jack Wright and His Electric Tricycle; or, Fighting the Stranglers of the Crimson Desert" by "Noname" (Luis Senarens).
- Pluck and Luck No. 1075, January 8, 1919, "Jack Wright and his Ocean Plunger; or, The Harpoon Hunters of the Arctic" by "Noname" (Luis Senarens).
- Pluck and Luck No. 1083, March 5, 1919, "Jack Wright and His Electric Sea Ghost; or, A Strange Under Water Journey" by "Noname" (Luis Senarens).
- Science And Invention, October 1920, "An American Jules Verne" by anonymous (Hugo Gernsback).

== Modern appearances ==
- Jack Wright the Boy Inventor by Joseph Lovece
- Nemo: Heart of Ice by Alan Moore
