= Frank Reade =

Fictional character

Frank Reade was the protagonist of a series of dime novels published primarily for boys. The first novel, Frank Reade and His Steam Man of the Plains, an imitation of Edward Ellis's The Steam Man of the Prairies (1868), was written by Harry Enton and serialized in the Frank Tousey juvenile magazine Boys of New York, February 28 through April 24, 1876. The four Frank Reade stories concerned adventures with the character's inventions, various robot-like mechanisms powered by steam.

A very long series of juvenile novels followed which featured the son of Frank Reade, Frank Reade Jr., as its teenaged inventor-hero. These stories were written by Luis P. Senarens (1865–1939) with the pseudonym Noname. Extremely popular during their time, they were often reprinted and new stories have been created as recently as 2011, in the pulp short story collection, Wildthyme in Purple. They were first serialized in Boys of New York, then the individual novels were collected in the Franke Reade Library series that followed. Some were later reprinted in Wide Awake Library.

His inventions included airships of the dirigible-balloon and helicopter type, submersibles, steam-driven and electrical land vehicles, and steam- and electric-powered robots.

The Frank Reade stories are perhaps the best known of the many boys' invention fiction series published in America during the later 19th century. Frank Reade Jr. has appeared as an older man in Alan Moore's Nemo: Heart of Ice, and the Reade family as a whole has also been featured in Paul Guinan and Anina Bennett's Frank Reade: Adventures in the Age of Invention.

== Examples ==
- #12 Frank Reade and His Steam Man of the Plains; Or, The Terror of the West (1876)
- #14 Frank Reade and His Steam Horse (1876)
- #16 Frank Reade and His Steam Team (1876)
- #18 Frank Reade and His Steam Tally-Ho (1876)
- #20 Frank Reade, Jr., and His Steam Wonder (1882/1893)
- #22 Frank Reade, Jr., and His Electric Boat (1882/1893)
- #26 Frank Reade Jr., and His Air-Ship (1883-84/1893)
- #34 Across the Continent on Wings; Or, Frank Reade Jr.'s Greatest Flight (1885/1893)
- #44 Frank Reade, Jr., and His Queen Clipper of the Clouds (1893)
- #53 From Pole to Pole; Or, Frank Reade, Jr.'s Strange Submarine Voyage (1890/1893)
- #58 Frank Reade, Jr., and His Electric Coach; Or, The Search for the Isle of the Diamonds (1890/1893)

== See also ==
- Edisonade
- Steampunk
- Tom Swift
- Tom Swift Jr.
- Jack Wright
