= Luis Senarens =

American writer (1863–1939)

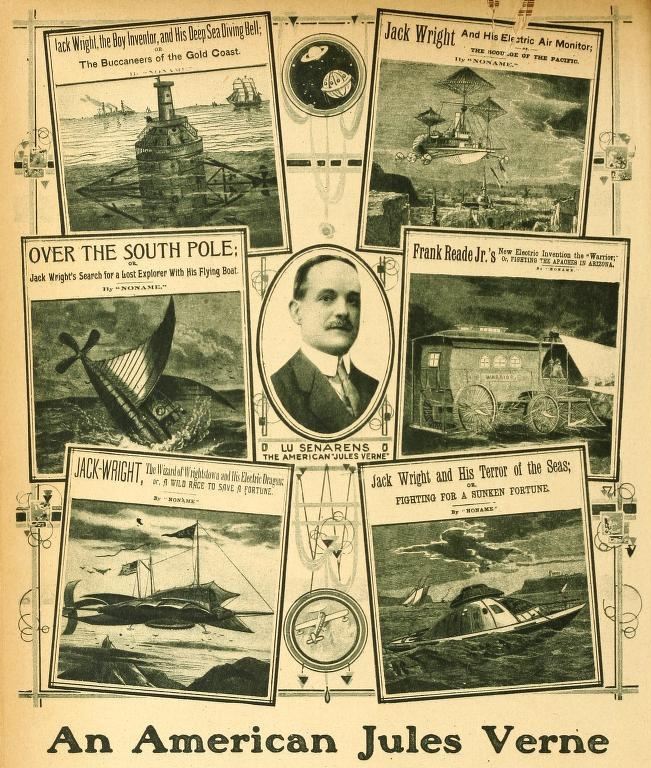
Lu Senarens, the American Jules Verne

Luis Philip Senarens (April 24, 1863 – December 26, 1939) was an American dime novel writer specializing in science fiction, once called "the American Jules Verne".

== Biography ==
Senarens grew up in a Cuban-American family in Brooklyn. Around 1882, Senarens began writing new stories in the Frank Reade adventure story series begun by Harry Enton in 1868. Senarens introduced Frank Reade, Jr. as the new main character. Senarens added elements such as electricity, airships, and helicopters which resulted in him being called "the American Jules Verne." The stories were very successful, and by the 1890s Senarens was asked by publisher Frank Tousey to write a similar series featuring Jack Wright, the "Boy Inventor". Later in the decade, Tousey created the Frank Reade Library, a periodical devoted to "invention" stories, largely (or wholly) composed by Senarens using the pseudonym Noname. Mike Ashley calls him "the first prolific writer of science fiction". He would eventually write more than 300 dime novels.

In 1917 Senarens became the editor of the Tousey detective story periodical, Mystery Magazine.

Senarens also wrote under the names Kit Clyde, W. J. Earle, Police Captain Howard, Noname and Ned Sparling.

== Works ==
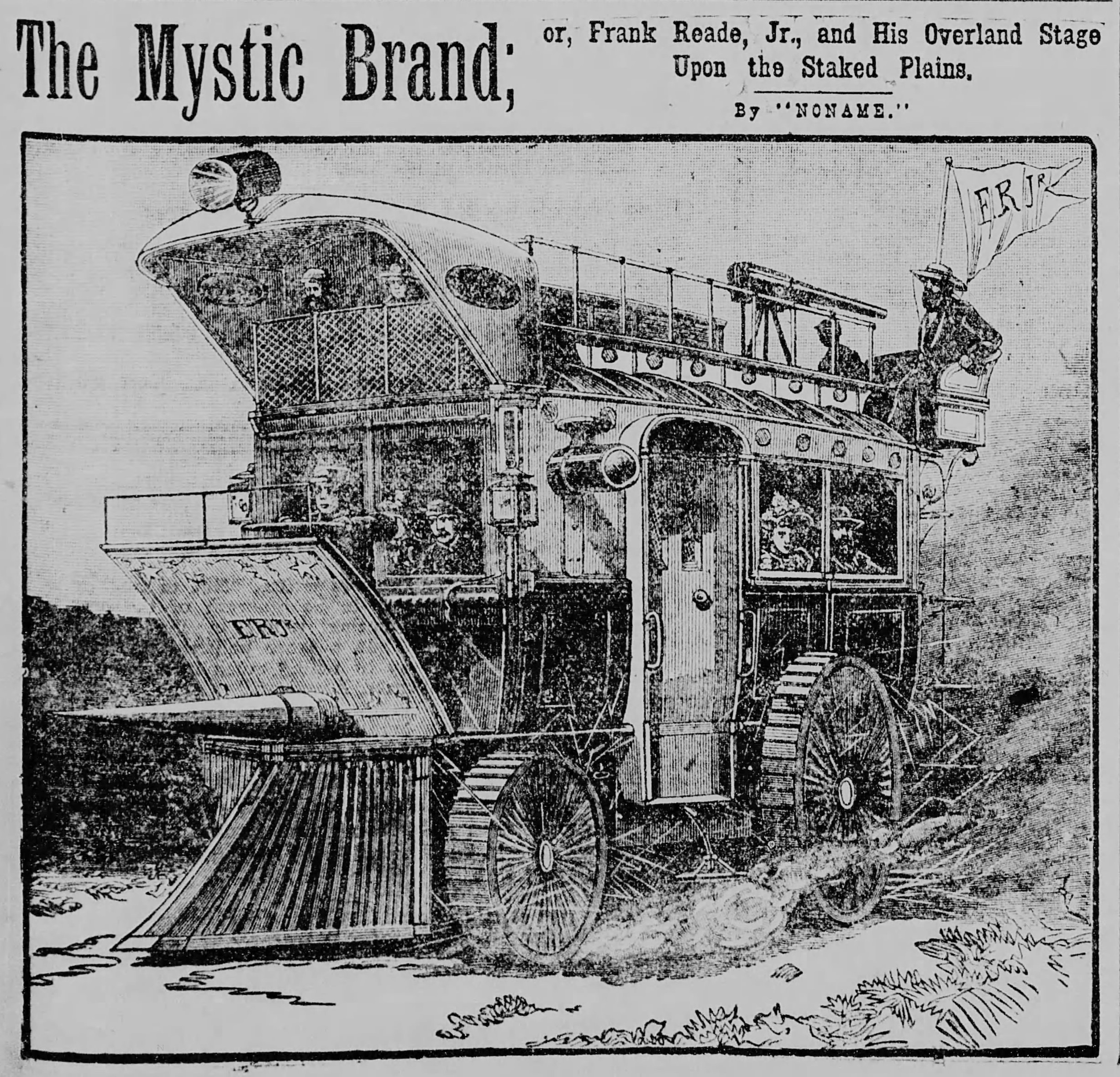
The Mystic Brand or Frank Reade Jr. and His Overland Stage Upon the Staked Plains by NONAME

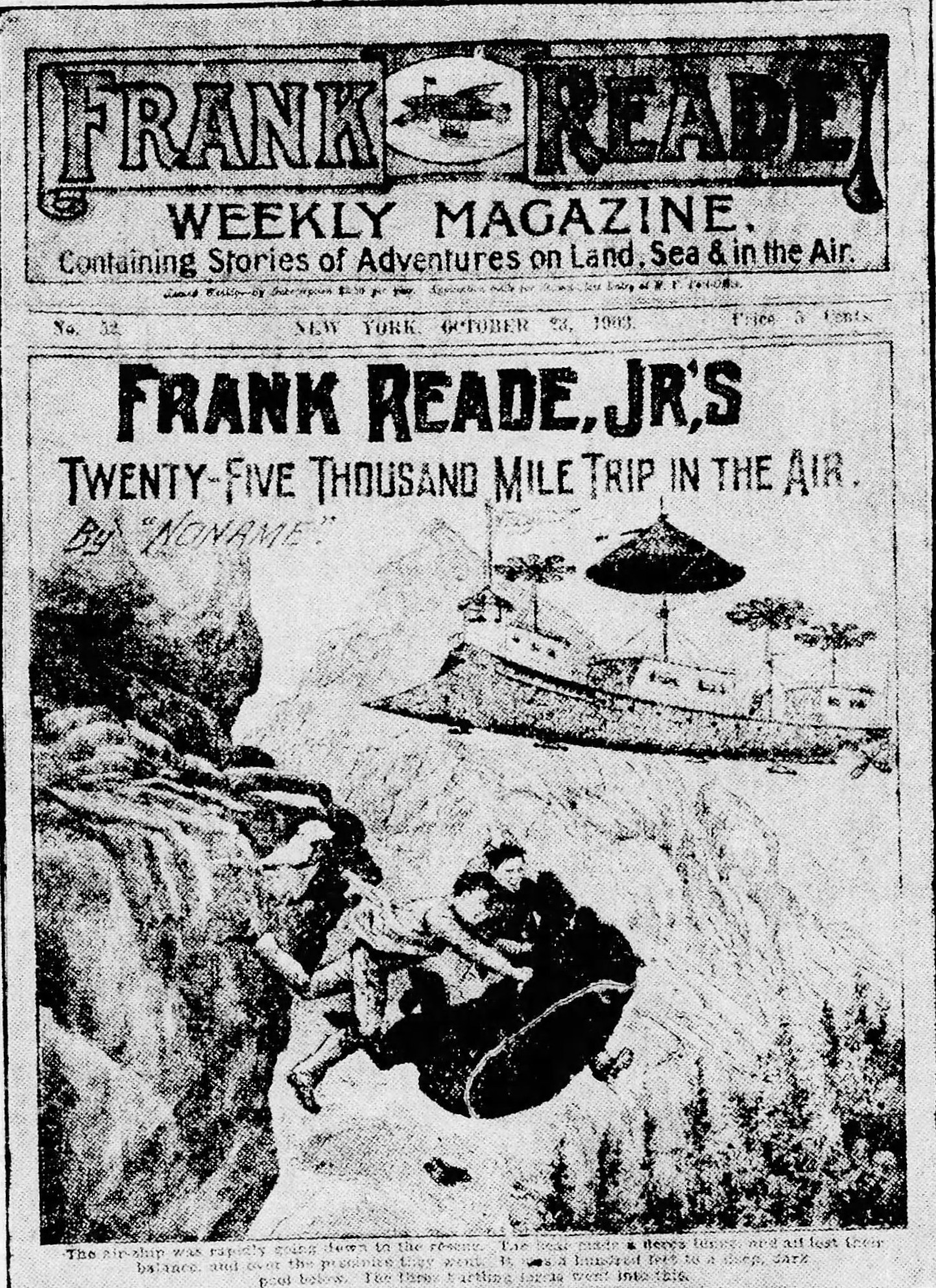
Frank Reader Jr's Twenty-Five Thousand Mile Trip In The Air by NONAME

=== Frank Reade, Jr. series ===
The eleven Frank Reade, Jr., stories were published as by NONAME.

- Frank Reade, Jr., and His Airship (1884)
- Frank Reade, Jr., and His New Steam Man: the Young Inventor's Trip to the Far West (1892)
- Frank Reade Jr., and His Queen Clipper of the Clouds (1893)
- Frank Reade, Jr., and His Steam Wonder (1893)
- From Pole to Pole; Or, Frank Reade, Jr.'s Strange Submarine Voyage (1893)
- Lost in a Comet's Tail, or Frank Reade, Jr.'s Strange Adventure with His New Airship (1895)
- Lost in the Atlantic Valley Or, Frank Reade, Jr., and His Wonder, the "Dart" (1903)
- From Zone to Zone Or, The Wonderful Trip of Frank Reade, Jr., with His Latest Air-Ship (1903)
- Frank Reade, Jr.’s Search for the Silver Whale; Or, UNDER THE OCEAN IN THE ELECTRIC “DOLPHIN”
- The Transient Lake, or Frank Reade, Jr.’s Adventures in a Mysterious Country.
- The Sunken Isthmus or, Frank Reade, Jr., in the Yucatán Channel.

=== Jack Wright series ===
- Jack Wright, The Boy Inventor (1891)
- Jack Wright And His Electric Canoe (1891)
- Jack Wright And His Under-Water Iron-clad (1891)
- Jack Wright And His Prairie Engine (1892)
- Jack Wright And His Electric Air Schooner (1892)
