= Frank Tousey =

American book publisher (1853–1902)

Frank Tousey (1853–1902) was among the top five publishers of dime novels in the late 19th-century and early 20th-century. Based in New York, his sensationalism drew a large audience of youth, hungry for scenes of daring and tormented heroes and damsels in distress. Of particular notice in his approach to the 'blood and thunder' genre were the vivid cover illustrations of his dime novels, which were consistently larger and more thrilling than previous publications. Although focused on fictional weeklies, Tousey managed a variety of materials over time, including some handbooks, gossip sheets, and even a newspaper on current events in the Spanish–American War.

== Early life ==
Frank Tousey was born in Brooklyn, New York on May 24, 1853. Son of George G. Tousey (1825–1869) and Elizabeth Corks (1846–1903), Frank was one of six children, with two older brothers (John W. Tousey, 1847–1862; George C. Tousey, 1848–1898) and three younger (Edward F. Tousey, 1855–?; DeWitt Tousey, 1858–1858; Sinclair Tousey Jr., 1862–1915). His uncle, Sinclair Tousey, poses some significance to Frank's later career in publishing. Sinclair Tousey is best known as the founder and president of the American News Company (1864) and as an extraordinarily powerful and rich player in the field of American publishing, based on his quasi-monopoly over text distribution in the country.

== Career ==
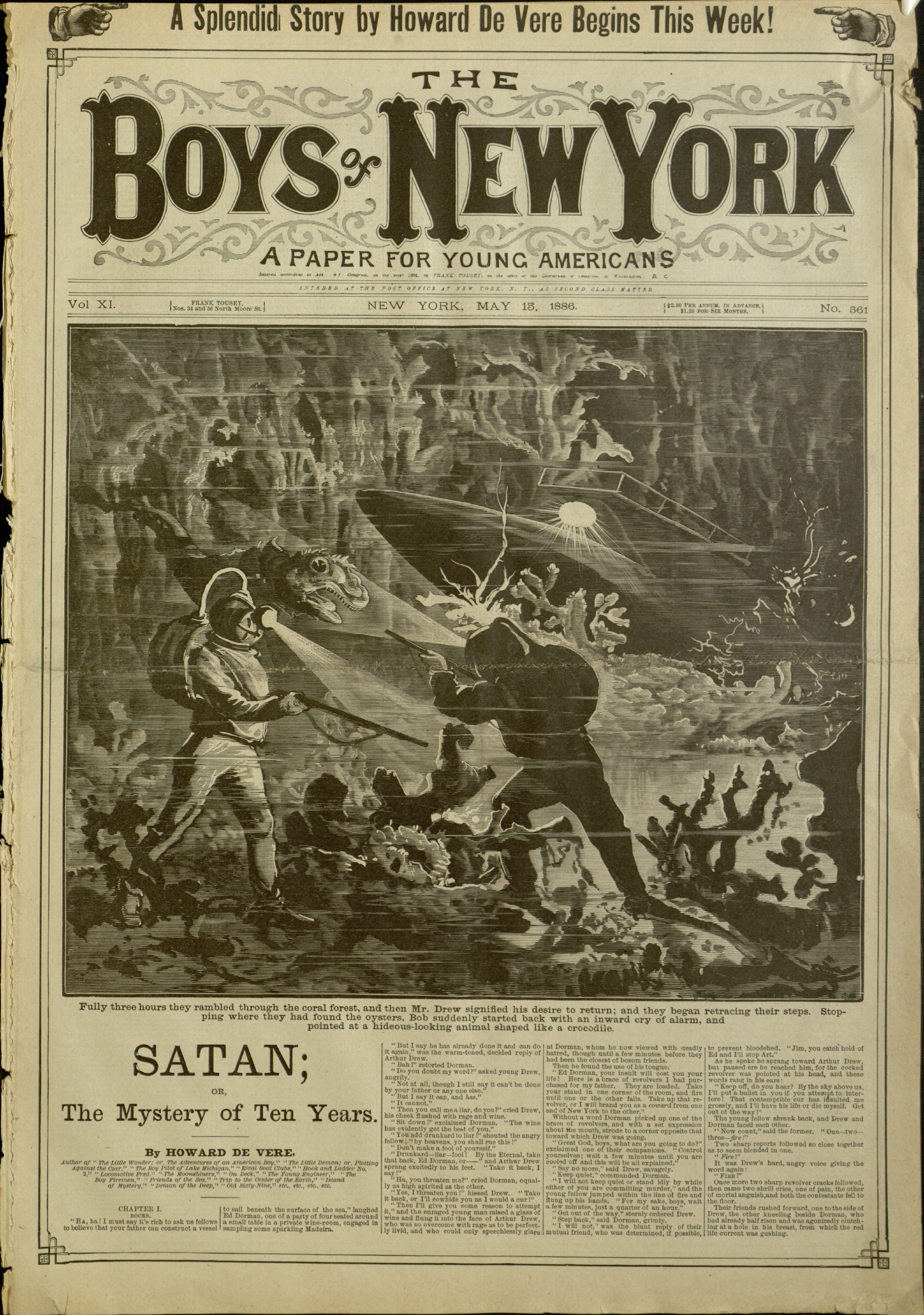
An attack of a "hideous-looking animal shaped like a crocodile" upon two sea-bound adventurers

Frank began his career in publishing in 1872 by working with Norman Munro, a Canadian-born publisher with questionable principles. In 1877, Tousey split from Munro and relocated to no. 116 Nassau Street, taking with him Munro's highly successful editor, George Small, whom Norman had originally stolen from his brother and publishing rival, George Munro., So begins yet another competitor for Norman L. Munro. Tousey and Small gained much success with their newly founded papers New York Boys Weekly (March 17, 1877) and Young Men of America (Sept. 13, 1877). Much of this success could be attributed to the large, sensational front page image, which at 7 inches deep to covering the full page, was certainly more eye-catching than the former 5 inch deep images used in Munro and other papers. The images themselves used the same technique which had earlier granted Munro's stories superiority: a divergence from good and safe to dreadful and shocking. While Munro's novels featured a shift to more criminal, youthful protagonists, Tousey and Small's front-page pictures exhibited terrifying scenes of aliens, monsters, torture, and overall horror.

Facing a variety of financial troubles and ultimately, bankruptcy, Munro sold his popular papers Our Boys and Boys of New York, along with 138 issues of the New York Boys' Library to Tousey and Small in 1878. Starting with the first issue (No. 153, July 20, 1878) under the management of Tousey and Small, Boys of New York incorporated New York Boys Weekly. In likewise fashion, Our Boys merged with Young Men of America for the latter's issue No. 43, July 4, 1878. Simply put, after combining these four periodicals, only Boys of New York, originally of Munro, and Young Men of America, the brain child of Tousey and Small, continued with their published names. The new owners also renamed the New York Boys' Library as the Wide Awake Library. Without Munro's inspiring rivalry, and thus any substantial competition, Tousey's sensationalism diminished slightly over the next decade.

In 1879, George Small faded from the limelight of these notable novels. At the start of this year, Small relinquished his partnership with Tousey, although he remained involved in Tousey's papers until the end of his days. It was also in this year that Frank Tousey joined Rosalie Andrews in matrimony.

Following Small's withdrawal, Tousey attempted a new project: American Life. This illustrated paper was intended to cater to a higher class audience, but the venture was a dismal failure. Tousey next joined forces with James Albert Wales in 1881 to co-manage The Judge, a satirical, sixteen-page magazine. It was a short-lived success. Suffering financial strain, Tousey relocated to North Moore Street and began publishing the Brookside novels. This series was initially a high-seller, but it soon came under fire for 'improper' stories. In 1884 Anthony Comstock charged Tousey for printing G. W. M. Reynolds' "The Mysteries of the Court of London" in The Brookside Library, a story deemed a vice. Frank Tousey's uncle, Sinclair Tousey, provided him with bail and the nephew's legal adviser, W. H. Townley, claimed that Comstock's accusation was a personal vendetta against Tousey for caricatures made of the former in The Judge under Tousey's ownership. Following review in the Tombs, Tousey was required to destroy the plates in order to avoid further prosecution.

A year later, on March 14, 1885, Tousey made an assignment to Stillman R. Walker. This maneuver was the consequence of a number of financial troubles, including Tousey's losses with American Life, The Judge, and his conflict with Comstock. In addition, Tousey was dealing with a recent strike from his compositors, who were protesting a 15 cent cut in wages. Further trouble came from the Knights of Labor, an organization which induced many newsdealers to boycott the sale of Tousey's publications.

== Notable artists, authors, and works ==
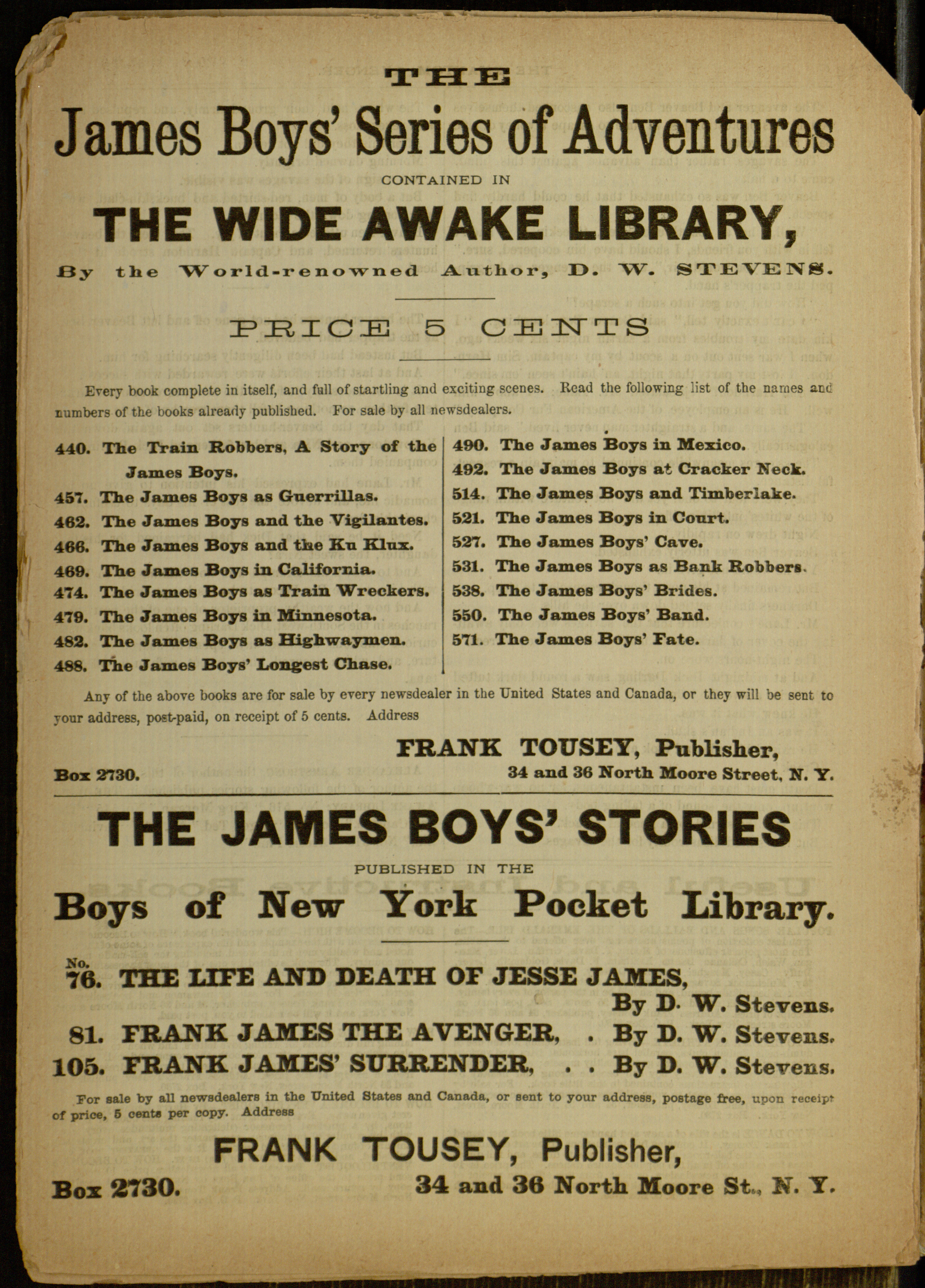
A listing of the James Boys' Series from Tousey's "Wide Awake Library"

Frank Tousey was responsible for the publication and promotion of several artists, authors, and characters. As an example of his significant contribution to science fiction, Tousey was largely responsible for the creation of the immensely popular characters Frank Reade and Jack Wright, written by Dr. Harry Enton and Luis Senarens (both published under "Noname'). Certainly, the stories and illustrations in Tousey's dime novels are said to rival Jules Verne for imagination and to have provided the pioneer boy inventors who would lead to Tom Swift.

In 1881, the first Jesse James dime novel story appeared in Tousey's five-cent Wide Awake Library: "The Train Robbers; or, A Story of the James Boys'. While this factual-made-fictional bandit was already famous in other literature, it would be some years yet for dime novels to fully market on him. Not only first on the scene, Tousey also became a major source of output for the James tales in dime novels. He even created a series called James Boys Weekly, and his works exhibited both the fictional character and real life events.
