= List of The League of Extraordinary Gentlemen characters =

This is a collection of the characters from The League of Extraordinary Gentlemen, a comic book series created by Alan Moore and Kevin O'Neill, and its spin-off Nemo.

== Overview ==
Character's name

- Original source/author
- Appearances or mention in the League universe
- Brief biography/overview
- Notes

Abbreviations:

- ASV: Allan and the Sundered Veil
- NTA: The New Traveller's Almanac
- BD: The Black Dossier
- MIM: Minions of the Moon
- NHI: Nemo: Heart of Ice
- NRB: Nemo: The Roses of Berlin
- NRG: Nemo: River of Ghosts
- T: Tales of The League of Extraordinary Gentlemen

An italicised appearance is either a graphic novel or film appearance where the character is only mentioned in dialogue or otherwise referenced but not shown or a text story appearance where the character is mentioned either briefly or indirectly.

== A ==
=== Alice ===
- Alice's Adventures in Wonderland, Lewis Carroll
- NTA
- Mentioned in The New Traveller's Almanac, which suggests that Wonderland is somewhere underneath England and/or in a parallel universe. She is mentioned to have died following her second adventure, which had the effect of 'reversing' her body chemistry's chirality, making her incapable of digesting anything and causing her to starve.
- She is called 'A. L.', presumably for Alice Liddell, whom the character was named after.

=== King Arturus ===
- Arthurian Legend
- BD
- The King of England who had Sir Roland (Orlando) serve under him in the Knights of the Round Table. His sword Excalibur is taken by Sir Roland in the fall of Camelot.

=== Count Allamistakeo ===
- "Some Words with a Mummy", Edgar Allan Poe
- Volume 1 cover
- An immortal mummy and proposed member of a mid-19th century League.
- He is shown sleeping on the cover of Volume 1, and his name and portrait displayed.

=== Ariel ===
- The Tempest, William Shakespeare
- NTA, BD
- Faerie familiar of Prospero's and a member of Prospero's Men (the 17th century League).

=== Artful Dodger ===
- Oliver Twist, Charles Dickens
- Volume 1, issue #6 (p. 3)
- Dodger leads his gang of children into London's sewers for protection against the air war between Professor Moriarty and Fu Manchu.

=== Ayesha ===
- She, H. Rider Haggard
- BD, NHI, NRB
- Immortal, brutal, deposed ruler of the African kingdom of Kor, she is robbed of her most priceless treasures by Janni Nemo while in asylum in the United States in 1925. Ayesha joins forces with Adenoid Hynkel in 1941.

== B ==
=== Babar the Elephant ===
- Histoire de Babar (The Story of Babar), Jean de Brunhoff
- NTA
- King of the Elephants, but not mentioned by name, Babar and his elephants escort Mina Murray and Allan Quatermain through the African jungle in The New Traveller's Almanac. Mina considers them very polite, but Allan denies that their leader is really wearing a crown.

=== Pvt. S. Baldrick ===
- Blackadder Goes Forth, Tony Robinson
- BD
- The stupid soldier serving under Captain Blackadder in World War I. Not mentioned by name, he appears as a visual cameo in Orlando's Trump biography.

=== Judah Ben-Hur ===
- Ben-Hur: A Tale of the Christ, Lew Wallace
- BD
- Jewish prince and merchant in Jerusalem. Not mentioned by name, his name is written in a bust in the house of Billy Bunter.

=== Beowulf ===
- Beowulf
- BD
- A hero who aides King Hrothgar in killing the demon Grendel.

=== Bill and Ben ===
- Flower Pot Men, BBC
- BD
- A pair of creatures made up of flowerpots, their skeletons are seen in Greyfriars School.

=== Sir Percy Blakeney ===
- The Scarlet Pimpernel, Emma Orczy
- Volume 1, issue #2 (p. 23, pnl.2), Volume 1 cover, NTA, BD, F
- The masked do-gooder, the Scarlet Pimpernel, Percy saves members of the French aristocracy from the guillotine during the French Revolution. He is a member of the 18th century League under Lemuel Gulliver.
- In Volume 1 Sir Percy is shown in the Montegu House portrait of Gulliver's Fellowship (the 18th century League), and his name appears in the caption. In the film, he only appears in a painting on the wall.

=== Horatio Blimp ===
- The works of David Low
- Volume 2 issue #2, Volume 2 issue #3 BDS
- An overconfident major in the British army who leads the initial strike against the Martians, he is seen again in "What Ho, Gods of the Abyss!"

=== Peter Blood ===
- Captain Blood, Rafael Sabatini
- NTA
- Member of the Pirates' Conference.

=== Boadicea ===
- Real individual
- Volume 3 (1910)
- Warrior queen of the Iceni in Roman times.
- Seen by Andrew Norton, he also mentions the urban legend that her bones are buried beneath King's Cross Platform 10.

=== Sir Basildon Bond ===
- Character developed by Russ Abbot as a parody of James Bond, playing on the name of a well-known brand of notepaper.
- BD
- Associate of Sir Jack Wilton.

=== Campion Bond ===
- Original character
- Volume 1 issue #1, Volume 1 issue #2, Volume 1 issue #4, Volume 1 issue #5, Volume 2 issue #2, Volume 2 issue #3, Volume 2 issue #6, NTA, BD, Volume 3 issue #1, N
- Agent of MI5 and handler of the first Murray Group (the late 19th century League).
- Grandfather of James Bond.

=== James "Jimmy" Bond ===
- Casino Royale, Ian Fleming
- BD, Volume 3I2, Volume 3I3
- Successor and grandson of Campion, he is portrayed as an incompetent bungler, a cowardly liar, and a sadistic rapist who betrayed his country and worked for the American government as a double agent. By 2009, he is said by Emma Night to be in constant physical pain from a combination of cirrhosis, emphysema, and syphilis. Having become a national treasure, he has been replaced by a succession of namesakes shown staffing MI5 headquarters and resembling the various Bond film portrayers Sean Connery, George Lazenby, Roger Moore, Timothy Dalton, Pierce Brosnan and Daniel Craig.
- Identified only as "Jimmy" or as "Sir James" as the James Bond character is not in the public domain.

=== Dr. Peter Bradey ===
- The Invisible Man (1958 television series)
- BD
- Successor to Hawley Griffin in the 1946-1947 league that was led by Joan Warralson, Bradey achieved invisibility by duplicating Griffin's experiments from discovered notebooks. He is noted as being a "distinctly second rate" Invisible Man, largely due to his compulsive chain smoking and coughing fits which gave him away on several occasions.

=== Broad Arrow Jack ===
- Broad Arrow Jack, E. Harcourt Burrage
- Volume 1 issue #4, Volume 2 issue #3-6, Volume 2 supplemental material, NTA, Volume 3I1, NHI, NRB, MIM
- Officer on the Nautilus.
- Married and fathered the child of Janni Nemo between 1925 and 1941.

=== Natty Bumppo ===
- The Deerslayer, James Fenimore Cooper
- Volume 1 issue #2 (p. 23, pnl.2), Volume 1 cover, NTA, BD, F
- American colonial raised by Native Americans and a member of the 18th century League under Lemuel Gulliver.
- In Volume 1 Natty is shown in the Montegu House portrait of Gulliver's Fellowship (the 18th century League), and his name appears in the caption.

=== William George "Billy" Bunter ===
- The Magnet, Frank Richards
- BD
- The former student and current caretaker of Greyfriars School, he reveals that his sister Bessie Bunter had been married to the late General Sir Harold "Big Brother" Wharton and that he was a schoolmate of both Wharton and Robert Kim Cherry.
- The picture Bunter is holding in his hand (BD p. 94, pnl.3) before he calls Harry Lime, aka "Mother", aka Bob Cherry, is not that of his late sister Bessie, who was an unpleasant nagging bully on top of being a female copy of her brother Billy, but that of his doting and adoring late mother.
- He is only referred to as "William" as the character is not in the public domain.

== C ==
=== Caliban ===
- The Tempest, William Shakespeare
- NTA, BD
- Brutish servant of Prospero and member of the 1680s League, Prospero's Men.

=== Dr. Caligari ===
- The Cabinet of Dr. Caligari, Robert Wiene
- BD, NRB
- Member of Die Zwielichthelden (in German as "The Twilight Heroes").

=== Thomas Carnacki ===
- The Gateway of the Monster, William Hope Hodgson
- BD, Volume 3I1
- Ghost finder, paranormal detective and a member of second Murray Group (the early 20th century League), in 1910 he received threatening premonitions of a black cabal led by Oliver Haddo who plans on bringing the end of the world. Carnacki and his team, however, discover that after confronting Haddo's cabal they found that the threat hasn't happened yet, and only inadvertently gives the magicians a crucial piece of information that they need to create the Moonchild.

=== Katy Carr ===
- What Katy Did, Sarah Chauncey Woolsey
- Volume 1, issue #2 (p. 13, pnl.2)
- One of Miss Coote's teachers.

=== Jack Carter ===
- Jack's Return Home, Ted Lewis
- Volume 3I2
- Hired by Vince Dakin to investigate the murder of Basil Thomas, he later kills Kosmo Gallion the vessel of Oliver Haddo.

=== John Carter ===
- A Princess of Mars, Edgar Rice Burroughs
- ASV, Volume 2 issue #1, Volume 2S
- A Confederate States Army officer who is transported to Mars and leads the native resistance against the mollusk invaders. John Carter is said to be the great-uncle of Randolph Carter.
- He is only referred to by his first name, as the character is not in the public domain in Europe.

=== Randolph Carter ===
- The Statement of Randolph Carter, H.P. Lovecraft
- ASV, NTA
- A Miskatonic University occultist and grand-nephew of John, Randolph met his grand-uncle and Allan Quatermain after he was lost during his dream quest. They were brought together by the Time Traveler, who needed their help in preventing the Great Old Ones (entities with which Randolph was very familiar) from invading creation. Randolph later returned to his dream quest after seeing his vision of his future. He was later reunited with Quatermain, who was accompanied by Mina Murray while investigating Arkham's peculiars. The two vaguely remembered each other, but couldn't recall their adventures in Allan and the Sundered Veil.

=== Roman Castevet ===
- Rosemary's Baby, Ira Levin
- Volume 3 (1969)
- Mentioned in name as the son of Adrian Marcato, an alias of Oliver Haddo. Castevet attempted to use Rosemary Woodhouse to give birth to an antichrist but the child died days after its birth.

=== Selwyn Cavor ===
- The First Men in the Moon, H. G. Wells
- Volume 1 issue #2 back cover, Volume 1 issue #2 (p. 22-23), BD, MIM
- A scientist who developed Cavorite, used for the British turn-of-the-century mission to, and annexation of, the Moon in 1901. A memorial to him was constructed in St. James Park after his death in 1901.

=== Professor George Edward Challenger ===
- The Lost World, Arthur Conan Doyle
- NTA, Volume 3I1
- Explorer and scientist, consultant to the second Murray Group.
- He is only briefly mentioned in dialogue, never shown in the series thus far.

=== Olive Chancellor ===
- The Bostonians, Henry James
- Volume 1 issue #2 (p. 13, pnl.2)
- One of Miss Coote's students.

=== Robert "Kim" Cherry ("Harry Lime") ===
- The Magnet, Frank Richards, The Third Man, The IPCRESS File, Len Deighton, The Avengers (c.1968-1969)
- BD
- The head of MI5.
- "Bob Cherry" was the name of one of Billy Bunter's classmates at Greyfriars School and a member of the Famous Five. His appearance resembles that of actor Michael Caine, perhaps referring to Caine's film portrayals of Len Deighton's anti-hero working-class spy character Harry Palmer. He is revealed in Black Dossier to be also the amoral smuggler Harry Lime created by Graham Greene and played by Orson Welles in the film The Third Man. His codename of "Mother" refers to the code name of John Steed's portly paraplegic superior on the later seasons of The Avengers. The nickname of "Kim" refers to Harold Adrian Russell "Kim" Philby, a Soviet double agent in MI6 who was part of the Philby-MacLean ring, another famous group of five.

=== Chitty Chitty Bang Bang ===
- Chitty-Chitty-Bang-Bang, Ian Fleming
- BD
- Magic car with personality, built by Caractacus Potts.
- Has ability to fly, float and has other hidden traits.
- The car is seen in the Ministry of Love being dismantled, with the famous license plate "GEN 1" visible.
- The car is implied to be the first in the line of James Bond cars based on the common author.

=== Vincent Chase ===
- Entourage, Adrian Grenier
- Volume 3III

=== Christian ===
- The Pilgrim's Progress, John Bunyan
- NTA, BD
- An etheric traveler and member of Prospero's Men (the 17th century League).
- He wandered into 1670s London after becoming wayward on his journey during his visit in Vanity Fair and was unable to return to his homeland. He was then committed to a madhouse before being rescued by Prospero. Christian later successfully returns to his world by traveling into the Blazing World.

=== Santa Claus ===
- NTA
- A mystic shaman of the North Pole who wears the inside out skin of a reindeer and on the Winter Solstice must send his spirit across the world guided by reindeer and dispense gifts.

=== Rosa Coote ===
- The Convent School, or Early Experiences of A Young Flagellant, William Dugdale
- Volume 1 issue #2, Volume 2S
- Dominatrix headmistress of an Edmonton girls' school.

=== Mrs. Cornelius (aka "Mrs. C") ===
- The Condition of Muzak, Michael Moorcock
- BD
- Mina Murray and Allan Quatermain Jr.'s foul-mouthed landlady when they were staying in Brookgate.

=== Jeremiah "Jerry" Cornelius ===
- The Final Programme, Michael Moorcock
- BD, Volume 3I2
- Jerry is seen with his sister/lover Catherine Cornelius and his brother/rival Frank Cornelius as young children in The Black Dossier and as a young man in Volume III: Century. In The Black Dossier, he and Catherine are trying to dispose of Frank's rapidly revivifying corpse.

=== Anna Coupeau ===
- Nana, Émile Zola
- Volume 1 issue #1
- One of the prostitutes killed by Hyde.

=== The Crimson Avenger ===
- Detective Comics, Jim Chambers
- BD
- An American superhero that Mina and Allan meet during their exile from Britain.

== D ==
=== Vince Dakin ===
- The Burden of Proof, James Barlow
- Volume 3I2
- A gangster in London, Dakin hires Jack Carter to investigate the murder of Basil Thomas.

=== Janni Dakkar ("Jenny Diver"/"Pirate Jenny", later Captain Nemo II) ===
- The Threepenny Opera, Bertolt Brecht
- Volume 3I1, Volume 3I2, NHI, NRB, NRG, MIM
- Janni, the daughter of Captain Nemo and heir to the Nautilus, she married Broad Arrow Jack. They have a grandson whose father is the descendant of Robur the Conqueror.

=== Dan Dare ===
- Dan Dare, Frank Hampson
- BD
- Newly appointed as the head of Britain's resumed space program along with Jet-Ace Logan and Captain Morgan, Dare is seen on the front page of a newspaper in the Malibu pub.

=== Dejah Thoris ===
- A Princess of Mars, Edgar Rice Burroughs
- ASV, Volume 2 issue #1, Volume 2S
- A princess of Mars and John Carter's lover, she was possibly captured or killed by the mollusk invaders. As Volume 2 takes place in the year-long interval she was held captive in the Temple of the Sun following the events of The Gods of Mars.
- Dejah Thoris is only mentioned in ASV as "almost naked ruby-clad princess". In Volume 2 issue #1 she is only once referred to and then only as "the princess". While she may be depicted in the supplementary material to Volume 2, it may also be Kane's Princess Shizala, or Gulliver's Princess Heru.

=== Dick Donovan ===
- The Man-Hunter: Stories from the Note-Book of a Detective, J. E. Preston Muddock
- Volume 1 issue #2
- Detective and MI5 agent who handles the recruitment of Hyde and Griffin.

=== The Doctor ===
- Doctor Who
- BD, Volume 3III
- A human-looking alien who is capable of traveling through time.
- His ship, the TARDIS, can be seen on a map of The Blazing World.
- The Second Doctor appears briefly during a scene featuring Lemuel Gulliver. The First and Eleventh Doctors appear together in another cameo in Century Volume 3.

=== Doctor John Dolittle ===
- The Story of Doctor Dolittle, Hugh Lofting
- NTA
- English doctor who can speak the languages of animals, he is never mentioned by name, but the postal service he founded in the African nation of Fantippo is mentioned in The New Traveller's Almanac. Mina Murray also states a disgust of a Spanish island's 'sport' of bullfighting in the section devoted to Europe and wishes for some 'animal lover' to put an end to this, implying the story is set before The Voyages of Doctor Dolittle, where Dolittle does just that. There is mention that he stopped warring tribes on Spider-Monkey island.

=== Count Dracula ===
- Dracula, Bram Stoker
- Volume 3|2
- The Vampire Lord appears to Mina in a drug-related hallucination from seeing a bat that drives her to insanity.

=== DriveShaft ===
- Lost
- Volume 3 (2009)
- Rock band previously led by singer Charlie Pace.
- DriveShaft appears on a poster advertising their upcoming album Oh, Who Cares?

=== Hugo Drummond ===
- Bulldog Drummond, H.C. McNeile
- BD
- A racist, jingoistic government agent who hunts down Murray and Quatermain. He learns from Murray that Jimmy Bond has been betraying his country and was responsible for the death of Drummond's friend, industrialist John Night. Drummond is killed by Bond.

=== C. Auguste Dupin ===
- "The Murders in the Rue Morgue", Edgar Allan Poe
- Volume 1 issue #1–2
- A Parisian detective who is assigned to investigate the recent murders of prostitutes in the Rue Morgue.

== E ==
=== Thomas Edison ===
- Real individual
- Volume 1 issue #1
- Inventor of some of the steampunk technology of the League universe. Though the name "Thomas Edison" is never mentioned or shown in the world of League, a circuit-breaker on the final page of Volume 1 issue #1 bears the logo "Edison Teslaton".

== F ==
=== Fantômas ===
- Fantômas, Marcel Allain, Pierre Souvestre
- NTA, BD
- Criminal mastermind and member of Les Hommes Mystérieux ("The Mysterious Men").

=== Samuel Ferguson ===
- Five Weeks in a Balloon, Jules Verne
- Volume 1 issue #5 (p. 22, pnl.5)
- An acquaintance of Captain Nemo, who gave him his balloon, the Victoria, Samuel's name appears on a tag attached to the balloon, marking it as the property of his famed expedition. He is not shown or expressly mentioned in the series thus far.

=== Fevvers ===
- Nights at the Circus, Angela Carter
- BD
- Winged acrobat whose name appears on a poster in Mina and Allan's rented lodgings.

=== Barney Fife ===
- The Andy Griffith Show, Don Knotts
- BD
- Sheriff's deputy in the fictional town of Mayberry, North Carolina (spelled "Maybury" in the Black Dossier).
- Briefly mentioned in a written portion of the Dossier, he encountered the League during their stay in America in the 1950s.

=== Phileas Fogg ===
- Around the World in Eighty Days, Jules Verne
- Volume 1 cover, F
- Gentleman explorer and proposed member of a mid-19th century League.
- Briefly mentioned by Quatermain in the film, noting his rapid journey from Africa to Britain is nothing compared to Fogg's world tour.

=== President Max Foster ===
- "The Day It All Happened, Baby!", Robert Thom
- Volume 3|2
- A hippie fascist President of the United States, he is mentioned by Mina. His policies lead to internment camps for those older than 30, who are then forced to drink LSD.

=== Frankenstein's monster ===
- Frankenstein, Mary Shelley
- NTA, BD, III
- Frankenstein's monster is mentioned in the sixth chapter of The New Traveller's Almanac, which covers discoveries in the Arctic and Antarctic. After the events of Frankenstein, the monster wandered the Arctic for several years before discovering Toyland, a settlement inhabited by sentient mechanical toys and ruled by the female automaton Olympia. He falls in love with Olympia, seeing her as the bride he always wanted, and becomes the Prince of Toyland. Some comments from Mina Murray suggest the monster's creator (Victor Frankenstein) may have been inspired by Coppelius, who originally built Olympia. The monster later appears alongside Olympia in Volume 4, where it is shown that other Frankensteins, resembling various renditions of the character, have been created.

=== Fu Manchu ===
- The Insidious Dr Fu Manchu, Sax Rohmer
- Volume 1 issue #3, Volume 1 issue #4, Volume 1 issue #6, Volume 2S, BD
- Leader of the Chinese organized crime in Limehouse, and personal and professional rival of Moriarty.
- In 1948, Limehouse having been purged by the INGSOC Party, he relocates to New York City. He is also a relative of Dr. Sachs and (according to the C.I.A.) Dr. No.
- He is never referred to by name as the character Fu Manchu is not public domain in Europe.

== G ==
=== Kosmo Gallion ("Charles Felton") ===
- The Avengers episode Warlock, Peter Arne, Satan Wants Me, Robert Irwin
- Volume 3I2
- Member of Oliver Haddo's cult. He becomes the host of Haddo's spirit following a body swap in 1948. Prior to this transformation, Kosmo is described as having been "so straight" by his former fiancée, Julia. As Charles Felton, he is killed by Jack Carter in 1969 during a failed attempt to transfer Haddo's spirit to the body of Terner.

=== Galley-Wag ===
- The Adventures of Two Dutch Dolls and a Golliwog, Florence Kate Upton
- BD, MIM
- Galley-Wag rescues Mina and Allan at the end of Black Dossier and takes them to The Blazing World. He is described as being made of dark matter. In Minions of the Moon, he, his dolls, and Mina are sent on a mission to the Moon by Prospero. The Galley-Wag is captain of the Rose of Nowhere, a balloon-type craft that uses pataphysical rose-propulsion which allows it to cross dimensions and the void of space.
- The Galley-Wag's appearance in this series caused some commotion among readers as the original name given to the character by Upton, "Golliwogg", mutated into a racial slur and his appearance into a racial stereotype (both to Upton's disdain) after unauthorized use of this originally kind and heroic character by other authors (such as Enid Blyton) depicted him as someone with naughty behavior. Alan Moore defended his use of the character during an interview with Pádraig Ó Méalóid on several points, noting the history of the character (which was mostly forgotten in the modern day), that he changed the name of the character to avoid the racial slur which was the only public domain character whose name was changed (for all other name changes, it was to disguise copyrighted characters to avoid lawsuits). He made the Galley-Wag into an alien to explain away his stereotypical appearance, and said that only the Upton stories were canon for his Galley-Wag, that he had already used famous offensive characters in the series without incident (such as the Chinese villain Fu Manchu), that Upton's original version was one of the few positively depicted black characters at the time Upton wrote her books (the Victorian era) and that Upton's original version "was a dignified and respectable figure. His courage and strength of character were ably demonstrated in his picaresque adventures, as was his intellectual acumen".

=== Godzilla ===
- Godzilla
- NRB
- A radioactive monster that attacked Japan until it was slain by Janni Nemo.

=== Auric Goldfinger ===
- Goldfinger, Ian Fleming
- NTA
- Commissions an expedition to find El Dorado.

=== Heinz Goldfoot ===
- Dr. Goldfoot and the Bikini Machine, Vincent Price
- NRG
- A "Swiss-German" scientist who takes over Rotwang's engineering projects and is "very partial to ladies' bosoms".

=== Dorian Gray ===
- The Picture of Dorian Gray, Oscar Wilde
- Volume 1 cover, Volume 1 supplemental material, Volume 2 issue #3, F, N
- His portrait hangs in the Secret Annex and is a possible member of a mid-19th century League.

=== Grendel ===
- Beowulf
- BD
- The scourge of Heorot who is slain by Beowulf.

=== Jimmy Grey ===
- The Iron Fish
- Volume 2 issue #4, BD
- Saved by Captain Nemo after the death of his parents by a Martian tripod. Later in life, as Professor James Grey and creator of the Iron Fish series of submersibles, he is a member of the Warralson Team, a surrogate League in the 1940s. A newspaper clipping on p. 14, pnl.1, of The Black Dossier suggests he was lost at sea in 1949.

=== Hawley Griffin ===
- The Invisible Man, H. G. Wells
- Volume 1 issue #2-Volume 2 issue #5, NTA, BD, Volume 3I1
- Member of the Victorian League (the first Murray Group), perverted sociopath, and traitor to mankind.
- Moore derived the character's last name from the book The Invisible Man, in which he is referred to only as "Griffin", a student and scientist. Moore has said that he derived Griffin's first name from that of Dr. Hawley Crippen, the infamous Edwardian murderer. He was mentioned in the film to be already dead and his legacy lived on when Rodney Skinner stole his invisibility formula.
- Griffin only appears in paintings in BD and Volume 3I1. In BD M references him to Jimmy once (BD p. 78, pnl.3).

=== Lemuel Gulliver ===
- Gulliver's Travels, Jonathan Swift
- Volume 1 issue #2 (p. 23, pnl.2), Volume 1 cover, NTA, BD, F
- The leader of the 18th century League.
- In Volume 1 Gulliver is shown in the Montegu House portrait of Gulliver's Fellowship (the 18th century League), and his name appears in the caption. In the film, he only appears in a painting on the wall. The Montegu House also features the skull of an "adult male Yahoo: Homo gulliverus".

== H ==
=== H-9 (Rupert Bear) ===
- Daily Express, Mary Tourtel
- Volume 2 issue #4-6, Volume 2S
- One of the creations of Dr. Moreau, he had been stalking Mina Murray and Allan Quatermain when they were searching for Moreau during the Martian invasion. H-9 later fully confronted the two when they were copulating in the woods, and brought them to Moreau. The doctor later reveals that H-9 bears a strong sexual instinct and he has to pay a local gypsy to "placate" the aggressive anthropomorphic bear.

=== H-11 (Algy Pug) ===
- Daily Express, Mary Tourtel
- Volume 2 issue #5, Volume 2S
- One of the creations of Dr. Moreau.

=== H-14 (Tiger Tim) ===
- Daily Express, Mary Tourtel
- Volume 2 issue #5-6, Volume 2S
- One of the creations of Dr. Moreau.

=== Oliver Haddo ===
- The Magician, W. Somerset Maugham, Rosemary's Baby, Ira Levin, "Casting the Runes", M. R. James, The Kindly Ones, Anthony Powell, The Devil Rides Out, Dennis Wheatley
- BD, Volume 3I1, Volume 3I2
- Haddo was first mentioned in The Black Dossier, as the author of On The Descent of Gods. He makes his full appearance in the first issue of Century, and serves as an antagonist in bringing forth a Moonchild destined to bring about the end of the world. He later possessed Lord Voldemort and had him stage the events of Harry Potter's adventures. Haddo was killed by Harry during his rampage, though he makes it clear that, even in the face of his son's overwhelming power, he isn't the least bit impressed, calling Harry a "banal" wizard and Anti-Christ and telling him that he has been nothing but a disappointment to him. His still-living head is later taken by Mary Poppins, though his ultimate fate is still unknown.

=== Gary Haliday ===
- Garry Halliday
- BD
- A commercial pilot who helps to inform Allan Quatermain and Mina Murray at Birmingham Spaceport about the various space rockets.
- Gary Haliday's name is a slight alteration of Garry Halliday of the eponymous TV show.

=== Richard "Dick" Hannay ===
- The Thirty-Nine Steps, John Buchan
- BD
- Hannay once mentioned to Mina Murray that the "real 39 steps" led to the "greatest secret in British Intelligence". Following this clue, Mina goes to Greyfriars School in Kent and discovers the real identity of "Harry Lime".

=== Septimus Harding ===
- The Warden, Anthony Trollope
- Volume 1 issue #2, Volume 2 issue #2
- A reverend that wrote articles against Miss Coote, he is killed by Martians on Horsell Common.

=== Jack Harkaway ===
- Jack Harkaway's Schooldays, Bracebridge Hemyng
- Volume 1 cover
- Schoolboy adventurer and proposed member of a mid-19th century League.

=== Fanny Hill ===
- Fanny Hill, John Cleland
- Volume 1 issue #3, Volume 1 cover, NTA, BD
- Member of the 18th century League under Lemuel Gulliver.

=== Mycroft Holmes ===
- The Adventure of the Greek Interpreter, Arthur Conan Doyle
- Volume 1 issue #6, Volume 2 issue #2-4, BD, Volume 3I1
- Head of MI5 following Moriarty's death and older brother of Sherlock Holmes.

=== Sherlock Holmes ===
- A Study in Scarlet, Arthur Conan Doyle
- Volume 1 issue #2, Volume 1 issue #5, Volume 1 issue #6, Volume 2 issue #3, NTA, BD, Volume 4 issue #6
- Younger brother of Mycroft, former Consulting Detective, and retired beekeeper, he was only shown once in the series throwing Professor Moriarty into Reichenbach Falls, believing that Moriarty did not survive the fall he climbed to safety. In The New Travellers' Almanac, it is said that Mina has met the retired, bee-keeping Holmes in Fulworth.

=== Captain Hook ===
- Peter Pan, J. M. Barrie
- NTA
- Member of the Pirates' Conference.

=== Horatio Hornblower ===
- The Happy Return, C. S. Forester
- Volume 2 issue #3, 1910, 1969
- Fictional Royal Navy officer – Midshipman through retired Admiral – from C. S. Forester's series set in the French Revolutionary and Napoleonic wars and after (last story set during the rise of Napoleon III). While he does not appear as a character per se in any of the League stories, his column appears (and is referred to as a meeting locale) in the place and form of world's Nelson's Column in League's Piccadily Circus.

=== Edward Hyde ===
- Strange Case of Dr Jekyll and Mr Hyde, Robert Louis Stevenson
- Volume 1 issue #1-Volume 1 issue #6, ASV, Volume 2 issue #2-Volume 2 issue #6, NTA, BD, Volume 3I1, "v3I2", F, N
- The larger, evil half of Henry Jekyll and member of the Victorian League. During the Martian invasion, he developed a strong respect for Mina Murray and sacrificed himself to stop Martian tripods from crossing London Bridge. His self-sacrifice was honored in having Serpentine Park named into Hyde Park and a statue of Hyde is seen in the park in The Black Dossier.

=== Adenoid Hynkel ===
- The Great Dictator, Charlie Chaplin
- BD, NRB
- The dictator of Germany in the 1930s and 1940s, "Herr Hynkel" led the country during World War II much as Adolf Hitler did in the real world. He appears as an antagonist only in Nemo: The Roses of Berlin.

== I ==
=== The Iron Warrior ===
- Thrill Comics and New Funnies
- BD
- A 1930s prototype military automaton and a member of the failed 1940s Warralson league, where it served as a "faintly desperate attempt" to counterpart Edward Hyde's ferocious power. By this time, it was fairly dilapidated, so it exploded during the battle with pirate-slaver James Soames and Italian master-criminal Count Zero, thus ending the battle and disbanding the league.

=== Ishmael ===
- Moby-Dick, Herman Melville
- Volume 1 issue #4, Volume 2 issue #4, Volume 3I1, NHI, F, N
- First mate on the Nautilus, serving under Captain Nemo and then Janni Nemo. His son takes his place in 1941.

=== Ithaqqa ===
- Ithaqua, August Derleth
- ASV
- A Great Old One that possesses Allan Quatermain and is driven off by Marisa.

== J ==
=== Jeeves ===
- "Extricating Young Gussie", P. G. Wodehouse
- BD
- Assists the second Murray Group in the Brinkley Court Affair.

=== Henry Jekyll ===
- Strange Case of Dr Jekyll and Mr Hyde, Robert Louis Stevenson
- Volume 1 issue #2-Volume 2 issue #2, Volume 2 issue #3, Volume 2 issue #5, F, N
- A scientist who is the lesser half of Edward Hyde and member of the Victorian League.

=== Tracy Jordan ===
- 30 Rock, Tracy Morgan
- Volume 3III
- The Star of TGS with Tracy Jordan, he appears through the poster for his movie Who Dat Ninja.

=== Gullivar Jones ===
- Lieut. Gullivar Jones: His Vacation, Edwin Lester Arnold
- Volume 2 issue #1
- One of the leaders of the Martian resistance.

== K ==
=== Charles Foster Kane ===
- Citizen Kane, Orson Welles
- NHI
- An extremely powerful and influential publishing magnate, Kane hires three American scientists/adventures to pursue Janni Nemo and recover the treasure that she stole from his guest, Queen Ayesha.

=== Michael Kane ===
- Kane of Old Mars, Michael Moorcock
- Volume 2 issue #1
- A human man transported back in time to Mars, where he establishes a ruling dynasty, Kane was mentioned in dialogue between Gullivar Jones and John Carter, with Carter believing that he is not native to Earth and that his Earth name was a "coincidence".

=== King Kong ===
- King Kong
- NHoI
- A gigantic ape which was slain in New York after its extraction from its home. The bones were returned to Skull Island.

=== Mister Kiss ===
- Mother London, Michael Moorcock
- BD
- Professional mind-reader, stage performer, lodger at Mrs. Cornelius's boarding house.

=== Kutulu ===
- The Call of Cthulhu, H.P. Lovecraft
- BD
- Cthulhu, the dread god of R'lyeh
- Mentioned by Oliver Haddo in "On the Descent of the Gods" as "Kutulu" and by the Rt. Hon. Bertram Wilberforce Wooster in "What Ho, Gods of the Abyss!", misheard it as "Cool Lulu".

== L ==
=== Lavell ===
- The War of the Worlds, H. G. Wells
- Volume 1 issue #2
- An astronomer who discovers jets of gas on Mars, actually the launch of the Martians' fleet.

=== Jedediah Leland ===
- Citizen Kane, Joseph Cotten
- NHI
- Star reporter and long time friend of Charles Foster Kane, who discusses the aftermath of the ill-fated 1925 Antarctica expedition with him.

=== Ho Ling ===
- The Case of Ho Ling, Thomas Burke
- Volume 1 issue #3
- Ho Ling is seen being tortured by Dr. Fu-Manchu in Volume 1, Book 3, in Shen-Yan's "Barber Shop".

=== Jet-Ace Logan ===
- The Comet
- BD
- Newly appointed as head of Britain's resumed space programme, along with Dan Dare and Captain Morgan, he is seen on the front page of a newspaper in the Malibu pub.

=== Long John Silver ===
- Treasure Island, Robert Louis Stevenson
- NTA
- Member of the Pirates' Conference.

=== Arsène Lupin ===
- "The Arrest of Arsène Lupin", Maurice Leblanc
- NTA, BD
- Gentleman thief and member of Les Hommes Mystérieux.

=== Vesper Lynd ===
- Casino Royale, Ian Fleming, Eva Green
- Volume 3III
- The love interest of James Bond VI, visual cameo only.

== M ==
=== "M" ===
- Casino Royale, Ian Fleming
- Volume 1 issue #1-6, Volume 2 issue #1-6, BD, Volume 3I, Volume 3II, F, N
- M is the codename of the head of Britain's intelligence services. Successive incumbents in the various League eras include Moriarty, Mycroft Holmes, Harry Lime and Emma Night.

=== Doctor Mabuse ===
- Dr Mabuse, der Spieler, Norbert Jacques
- BD, NRB
- Member of Die Zwielichthelden.

=== Mac the Knife ===
- The Threepenny Opera, Bertolt Brecht
- Volume 3I1
- MacHeath, a charismatic butcher, his full name is Jack MacHeath, and he is the true identity of Jack the Ripper, returning to London in 1910 to commit murders again. He was caught and was about to be hanged without trial until he was vouched by a message from the 14th Earl of Gurney (the lead character from the play The Ruling Class) who confesses to all the original Ripper crimes, making MacHeath a freed man.

=== Nomi Malone ===
- Showgirls, Elizabeth Berkley
- Volume 3III
- The popular stripper, whose appearance is on a poster in the background.

=== Maria ===
- Metropolis, Thea von Harbou, Fritz Lang
- BD, NRB
- A female automaton created to serve Dr. Rotwang.
- Serves the Hynkel regime in the Berlin Metropolis, wearing synthetic flesh for propaganda reasons.

=== Marisa ===
- Original character
- ASV
- An African maidservant and witch in the service of Lady Ragnall.

=== Mars Man ===
- Marsman Comics, circa 1948
- MIM
- Member of the 1964 league, the Seven Stars, he was a Martian explorer who came to Earth to study its "social life and civilization", but soon started fighting crime.

=== Andy Millman ===
- Extras, Ricky Gervais
- Volume 3III
- Mentioned in dialogue as appearing on a TV show.

=== Colonel Sebastian Moran ===
- The Adventure of the Empty House, Arthur Conan Doyle
- Volume 1 issue #5
- Right-hand man of Moriarty and occasional front of his criminal empire.

=== Alphonse Moreau ===
- The Island of Doctor Moreau, H. G. Wells
- Volume 2 issue #5-6, Volume 2S, NTA
- Vivisectionist, animal experimenter and hybrid disease creator who assisted the British government, Alphonse is implied to be the uncle of Gustave Moreau.

=== Dean Moriarty ===
- On the Road, Jack Kerouac
- BD
- Member of the 1950s American League and great-grandson of James Moriarty.

=== Professor James Moriarty ===
- The Adventure of the Final Problem, Arthur Conan Doyle
- Volume 1 issue #4-Volume 1 issue #6, MIM, F, N
- Head of MI5, and the "Napoleon of Crime" who survived his climactic battle with Sherlock Holmes at Reichenbach Falls. After his aerial battle against Doctor Fu Manchu, Moriarty was presumed dead when he was floated away into space by Cavorite. Mina Murray discovered his body sixty years later, still holding the Cavorite inside a block of ice floating through space.

=== Mors ===
- The Air Pirate and His Steerable Airship
- Volume 1 issue #3, Volume 1 issue #4, Volume 1 issue #6BC, Volume 2S
- A German pirate of the air.

=== Wilhelmina "Mina" Murray ===
- Dracula, Bram Stoker
- Volume 1 issue #1-6, Volume 2 issue #1-6, ASV, NTA, BD, Volume 3I1-3, MIM, T, F, N
- Leader of the Victorian-era League and the League of the 20th century, the Murray Groups.

== N ==
=== Hiro Nakamura ===
- Heroes, Masi Oka
- Volume 3I3
- A Japanese comic book geek with the ability to alter the flow of time and time-travel.
- Hiro is seen attempting to time-travel during the battle with the Antichrist. He appears as a visual cameo only.

=== Captain Nemo ===
- Twenty Thousand Leagues Under the Seas, Jules Verne
- Volume 1 issue #1-6, Volume 2 issue #1-6, NTA, Volume 3I1, BD, F, N
- Commander of the submarine Nautilus and member of Murray's first League, he left the League during the climax of the Martian invasion when the British government heartlessly used biological weapons against the Martians, which also doomed some people who were near the aliens. Nemo died on April 12, 1910, and was succeeded by his daughter Janni (Jenny Diver). Furthermore, on request of his death, Nemo's skull was nailed to the forecastle of the Nautilus which had been repainted black.

=== Emma Night ===
- Emma Peel of The Avengers, Diana Rigg
- BD, Volume 3I2
- Government agent and daughter of British industrialist Sir John Night, she adopts her husband's last name when she later marries test pilot Peter Peele. It is also implied that Emma grows up to be the female M of the modern James Bond films after her time in the Avengers serving under Mother (a.k.a. Robert Kim Cherry, a.k.a. Harry Lime). She learned the truth about her father's death. She also told Orlando she was keeping the aging Bond alive as long as possible, despite the fact that he was in great agony from several diseases. After the battle with the Antichrist was over, Emma resigned from MI5. Along with two other resigned agents, she helped move the body of Allan Quatermain (who had been killed during the battle) to Africa to be buried. She was last seen departing for locations unknown along with Mina and Orlando.

=== John Night ===
- Johnny Bull from the Greyfriars School series (The Magnet, 1908–1940), Charles Hamilton
- Sir John Knight, father of Emma Peel of The Avengers
- BD
- Not seen on-panel, John Night is an industrialist who designed many fantastic gadgets, and friend of Hugo Drummond. By the 1950s, Night received contract rights for his industry in supplying a United Nations intelligence department which brought enmity from the United States government who competed for the rights. Night was killed by Jimmy Bond who works as a double agent for the United States, and his death was covered up as a result from a heart attack.
- It is implied that John Night is the grown up version of Johnny Bull, a member of the Famous Five in the Greyfriars magazine serial and (later) novel series. This would imply that John Bull was a nickname because of his tremendous strength for a child his age. He was best friends with Harry Wharton and Bob Cherry, also members of the Famous Five. Of the Famous Five, he was the least capable of tolerating Billy Bunter.

=== Julius No ===
- Dr. No, Ian Fleming
- BD
- At the beginning of Black Dossier, Jimmy Bond had just defeated a "yellow peril" enemy located in Jamaica. It is later found that Dr. No was a fabrication by the CIA as a cover-story for Jimmy Bond's assassination of John Night. His name was a hint that there was "no doctor".

=== Andrew Norton ===
- Slow Chocolate Autopsy, Iain Sinclair
- BD, Volume 3
- Known as the "Prisoner of London", Andrew Norton travels through time but is stuck within the physical confines of London.

=== Nyarlathotep ===
- The Haunter of the Dark, H. P. Lovecraft, The Soft Machine, William S. Burroughs
- BD
- Nyarlathotep is mentioned throughout Black Dossier by various names, and finally makes a cameo appearance as an "emissary" from Yuggoth negotiating with Prospero a truce between the Blazing World and the Lloigor.

=== Le Nyctalope ===
- L'Homme Qui Peut Vivre dans l'Eau, Jean de La Hire
- NTA, BD
- Superhero and member of Les Hommes Mystérieux.

== O ==
=== Gerald O'Brien ===
- Nineteen Eighty-Four, George Orwell
- BD
- O'Brien was a director of MINILUV (The Ministry of Love), which was in charge of all of the intelligence agencies in Airstrip One (England). He later became head of INGSOC (The English Socialist Party) in 1952 upon the death of Big Brother, but O'Brien was unable to maintain power, and conceded to the Conservative Party's demands to be reinstated as an official party. Soon after he was voted out of office, most of the Ingsoc government's programs were reversed.

=== Kimball "Kim" O'Hara ===
- Kim, Rudyard Kipling
- BD
- Mentioned briefly as a spy who worked in colonial India and is the reason for the middle name of Robert Cherry.

=== Olympia ===
- "The Sandman", E. T. A. Hoffmann
- NTA, BD
- Queen of Toyland.

=== Orlando (Roland) ===
- Matter of France, Orlando: A Biography, Virginia Woolf, Orlando (The Marmalade Cat), Kathleen Hale, Story of O, Anne Desclos
- Volume 2 cover, NTA, BD, Volume 3I1, Volume 3I2, MIM, T
- Immortal omnisexual member of the Prospero, Gulliver, and second Murray Leagues, and mutual lover of Mina and Allan.
- For a period in his life, Orlando went by the name Vita, which is the name of Vita Sackville-West, who was the inspiration for Woolf's Orlando.
- In "Minions of the Moon" it is revealed that Orlando (as a female in 1964) is also O. from Story of O.

=== Captain Robert Owemuch ===
- The Floating Island, Richard Head
- NTA
- Robert Owemuch is an explorer, perpetual traveler and member of the 1680s League, Prospero's Men. He is also a captain of the Pay-Naught, the Excuse and the Least-in-Sight.

== P ==
=== David Palmer ===
- 24, Dennis Haysbert
- Volume 3III
- Mentioned as the President of the United States in 2009.

=== Sancho Panza ===
- Don Quixote de la Mancha, Miguel de Cervantes
- NTA
- Peasant servant/'squire' of Don Quixote, his brief, disastrous stint as a governor is mentioned in The New Traveller's Almanac.

=== Plantagenet Palliser (Elder) ===
- Can You Forgive Her?, Anthony Trollope
- BD
- Duke of Omnium and intelligencer for the 1680s League.

=== Plantagenet Palliser (Younger) ===
- Can You Forgive Her?, Anthony Trollope
- Volume 1 issue #2, Volume 1 issue #3 back cover
- Duke of Omnium and British Prime Minister in 1898.

=== Sal Paradyse ===
- On the Road, Jack Kerouac
- BD
- Member of the 1950s American League.

=== Peter Rabbit ===
- The Tale of Peter Rabbit, Beatrix Potter
- Volume 2 issue #6
- He was seen being fed by a mother fox to her young.

=== Pinocchio ===
- The Adventures of Pinocchio, Carlo Collodi
- Volume 2 issue #3
- His head is shown in the cover.

=== Mary Poppins ===
- Mary Poppins, P.L. Travers
- BD, Volume 3III
- A powerful aspect of God that represents love and kindness, she has reality bending powers that are used to defeat the antichrist in 2009.

=== Harry Potter ===
- Harry Potter and the Philosopher's Stone, J. K. Rowling, Moonchild, Aleister Crowley
- Volume 3III
- A boy wizard who was scarred by Oliver Haddo (who possessed Tom Riddle, Lord Voldemort) with the mark of the beast to become the Antichrist, and was never referred to by name. All of his adventures, friendships, and rivalries were staged to prepare him for his true purpose; even his name is false, as he is actually Haddo's son by way of Riddle's body. In his later life, the truth traumatised Harry to the point that he slaughtered all of the students, staff, and miscellaneous inhabitants of The Invisible College (Hogwarts) and killed Haddo, then kept his still-living head in a cage; he later massacred the entirety of Diagon Alley and killed his way back to the train station, where he escaped back into London. Harry then spent years hiding from the public in the now-abandoned Grimmauld Place, clawing off his mark, breaking his glasses, and shaving his head out of a paranoid fear of being found. He takes pills to manage his psychoses and constantly has to fight to keep his normal human appearance stable as he loses more and more of himself to his demonic nature. He was defeated by God (in the form of Mary Poppins) by being turned into a chalk drawing and was washed away by a thunderstorm.

=== Teddy Prendrick ===
- The Island of Doctor Moreau, H. G. Wells
- Volume 2 issue #4
- Former companion of Moreau who was driven mad by witnessing his experiments, he lives his life as a hermit and an astrologer as said in the novel, and was secretly observed by Moreau's hybrids lest he ever try to tell the public about Moreau and his experiments.

=== Prospero (aka John Suttle) ===
- The Tempest, William Shakespeare, The Alchemist, Ben Jonson
- NTA, BD, MIM
- Prospero is a wizard and exiled Duke of Milan who led the 1680s League. It is also stated, in Black Dossier, that Prospero is also John Suttle (Subtle from The Alchemist by Ben Jonson), and that Doll Common is Miranda's mother.

=== Captain Horatio Pugwash ===
- The Eagle, John Ryan
- NTA
- Member of the Pirates' Conference.

=== Captain Pysse-Gummes ===
- Zap Comix, S. Clay Wilson ("Captain Pissgums")
- Volume 2 issue #3
- Member of the Pirates' Conference.

== Q ==
=== Allan Quatermain ===
- King Solomon's Mines, H. Rider Haggard
- Volume 1 issue #1-Volume 2 issue #6, ASV, NTA, BD, Volume 3I1-Volume 3I3, F, N
- The Great White Hunter and last remaining member of the Victorian League following the Martian invasion, alongside Mina Murray.

=== Quong Lee ===
- The Song Book of Quong Lee of Limehouse, Thomas Burke
- Volume 1 issue #3, Volume 3I1
- A purveyor of fine teas.
- Also mentioned indirectly in Volume 3I1 (p. 13, pnl.7).

=== Don Quixote ===
- Don Quixote de la Mancha, Miguel de Cervantes
- NTA, BD
- Spaniard aristocrat turned knight-errant, and a member of the 16th century League, Prospero's Men.

== R ==
=== A. J. Raffles ===
- The Amateur Cracksman, Ernest William Hornung
- NTA, BD, Volume 3I1
- Gentleman thief and member of Murray's second League, Raffles' reason for joining the League was due to being blackmailed when his burglary career was uncovered. He later fought in World War One, and died during the Second Battle of Ypres.

=== Lady Luna Ragnall ===
- The Ivory Child, H. Rider Haggard
- ASV
- A friend of Allan Quatermain who similarly faked her death, she dies of fright after Quatermain is possessed by Ithaqaa.

=== Becky Randall ===
- Rebecca of Sunnybrook Farm, Kate Douglas Wiggin
- Volume 1 issue #2
- One of Miss Coote's students and Griffin's victims.

=== Frank Reade Jr. ===
- Frank Reade series, Luis Senarens
- NHI
- One of the three science heroes hired by Charles Foster Kane to catch Janni Dakkar.

=== Frank Reade Sr. ===
- Frank Reade series, Luis Senarens
- NHI
- Mentioned as the creator of the Steam Man of the Prairies.

=== Armand Robur ===
- Original character
- MIM, NHI
- Son of Jean Robur, son-in-law of Janni Nemo, husband of Hira Dakkar, and father of Jack Nemo.

=== Jean Robur ===
- Robur the Conqueror, Jules Verne
- Volume 1 cover, Volume 1 issue #2, Volume 1 issue #4, Volume 1 issue #6 back cover, NTA, Volume 2S, BD
- A dangerous and megalomaniacal air pirate, and member of Les Hommes Mystérieux ("The Mysterious Men"), also as a captain of the airship Albatross. He supposedly dies during World War One when his airship was shot down at the Battle of the Somme.

=== Dr. Carl Rotwang ===
- Metropolis, Fritz Lang, Thea von Harbou
- BD, NRB
- Member of Die Zwielichthelden ("The Twilight Heroes") and the creator of the highly advanced Berlin Metropolis.

== S ==
=== Doctor Sachs ===
- Doctor Sax, Jack Kerouac
- BD
- Sachs is opposed by Sal Paradyse and Dean Moriarty, two other characters of Kerouac's. He kidnaps Dean Moriarty, grandson of Professor James Moriarty, in order to perpetuate the family feud between the Moriarties and his own family, that of his relative Fu Manchu. Dr. Sachs is also in league with the Nova Mob, which in the world of League are conflated to being Lovecraftian monstrosities from the dream realm of Yuggoth.
- Doctor Sax wears a black cape and slouch hat and uses a chilling laugh to instill fear in his enemies, much like The Shadow. He is a talented alchemist who suffers from Visagus Nightsoil, a rare skin disease that turns his skin mossy green at night.

=== Arne Saknussemm ===
- Journey to the Center of the Earth, Jules Verne
- Volume 1 issue #2
- One of his runic markers from his expedition into the Earth's interior is in the Secret Annex.

=== William Samson, Sr. ===
- Original character
- Volume 2 issue #3, Volume 2 issue #5, Volume 2 issue #6
- Father of William Samson Jr., coach driver for the first Murray group, and veteran of the conflict against the "Mad Mahdi".

=== William Samson, Jr., The Wolf of Kabul ===
- The Wizard and The Hotspur
- BD
- Former adventurer of colonial India and a member of the failed 1940s League, he is the son of William Samson Sr.

=== Sapathwa ===
- The Blue Dwarf: A Tale of Mystery, Love, and Crime, "Lady Esther Hope" (William Stephens Hayward?), The Blue Dwarf, A Tale of Love Mystery and Crime; Introducing Many Startling Incidents in the Life of That Celebrated Highwayman, Dick Turpin, Percy Bolingbroke St. John
- Volume 1 cover
- A disguised noble criminal and proposed member of a mid-19th century League.

=== Scheharezade ===
- Thousand and One Nights
- BD
- Concubine of Caliph Haroun Al Raschid.

=== Sinbad ===
- Sinbad the Sailor, Anonymous
- NTA, BD
- Ancient explorer and lover of Orlando.

=== George Smiley ===
- Call for the Dead, John le Carré
- BD
- Assistant of M (a.k.a. Harry Lime) in 1958.

=== Captain Slaughterboard ===
- Captain Slaughterboard Drops Anchor, Mervyn Peake
- NTA
- Member of the Pirates' Conference.

=== Spring Heeled Jack ===
- English folklore c. 1837
- Volume 2S
- A devil-like figure with an ability to jump great distances.

=== Stardust the Space Wizard ===
- Stardust the Super Wizard, Fletcher Hanks
- MIM
- Stardust is depicted as a monstrously cruel fascist who attempted to gain access into a secret college of science-gods. He is defeated by Captain Universe who locked him in ice-nine and took control of his base.

=== Amber St. Clair ===
- Forever Amber, Kathleen Winsor
- BD
- Courtesan and member of Prospero's Men.

=== Stent ===
- The War of the Worlds, H. G. Wells
- Volume 2 issue #2
- The Astronomer Royal, he was killed by Martians on Horsell Common.

=== Stokes ===
- Original character
- Seemingly descended from Alf Stokes, from You Rang, M'Lord?
- Unlike his ancestor, he is a loyal manservant to Electrogirl, and attends her wedding.

=== Sun Wukong/The Monkey King ===
- Journey to the West, Wu Cheng'en
- NTA
- Simian demigod/demon of Chinese legend, also known as the "Great Sage Equal to Heaven", he is found stuffed in a Chinese museum by Orlando. Orlando doesn't believe the preserved body is as old as the museum claims due to its clothes being relatively recent.

=== Reverend Dr. Christopher Syn (Captain Clegg) ===
- Doctor Syn: A Tale of the Romney Marsh, Russell Thorndike
- Volume 1 issue #2 (p. 23, pnl.2), Volume 1 cover, NTA, F
- A pirate, smuggler, and clergyman, he is a member of Gulliver's Fellowship (the 18th century League), and also a member of the Pirate's Conference and the captain of the pirate ship Imogene.
- In Volume 1, Dr. Syn is shown in the Montegu House portrait of Gulliver's Fellowship (the 18th century League), and his name appears in the caption. In the film, he only appears in a painting on the wall.

== T ==
=== Suki Tawdry ===
- The Beggar's Opera, John Gay
- Volume 3I1
- Prostitute and resident of the Cuttlefish Hotel, she appeared to be almost supernaturally aware of the eventual arrival of the Nautilus and Janni Diver's massacre of the Hotel patrons.

=== Terner ===
- Performance, Mick Jagger, Donald Cammell
- Volume 3I2
- A rockstar who is being poised to become the next Daemon of Haddo.

=== Nikola Tesla ===
- Real individual
- Volume 1 issue #1
- Inventor of some of the steampunk technology of the League universe. A circuit-breaker on the final page of Volume 1 issue #1 bears the logo "Edison Teslaton".

=== Thomas the Tank Engine ===
- The Railway Series, Wilbert Awdry
- Volume 3 (2009)
- Thomas is a sentient steam locomotive from the Island of Sodor. He appears long-dead at the Invisible College, presumably killed by the Antichrist and has a visual cameo only.

=== Basil Thomas ===
- Down with Skool!, Geoffrey Willans
- Volume 3I2
- A member of the Purple Orchestra, and a sexual partner of Vince Dakin's lover, Wolfe Lissner.
- He is ritualistically murdered by Haddo's cultists.

=== Thor ===
- Norse mythology
- BD
- A Norse thunder god armed with a magical hammer, he is seen in "The Life of Orlando" slaying Jormungand during Ragnarök.

=== The Time Traveller ===
- The Time Machine, H. G. Wells
- ASV, Volume 2S
- A traveller through space and time who helped defeat the forces of the Great Old Ones.

=== Tiresias ===
- Greek mythology
- BD
- Father of Orlando and Manto, he was greatly dismayed to discover from Orlando that she inherited his gender-changing ability. Tiresias sold Orlando to pirate slavers and died escorting Manto to become the Oracle at Delphi.

=== Mr. Toad ===
- The Wind in the Willows, Kenneth Grahame
- Volume 2 issue #5, Volume 3I1
- Mr. Toad is one of Moreau's creations. Later, in 1910, it is shown preserved in a jar of formaldehyde as a specimen in the Secret Annexe of the British Museum.

== U ==
=== Captain Universe ===
- Captain Universe, Mick Anglo
- MIM
- Captain Universe is a space hero who worked with Mina in her disguise as Vull the Invisible during her time as a member of the Seven Stars, a British superhero group. He defeated Stardust the Space Wizard, locking him in ice-nine.
- Captain Universe is one of few copyrighted characters in the series to be used with permission from his creator, therefore having no need to mask the character's background.

== V ==
=== Jean Valjean ===
- Les Misérables, Victor Hugo
- NTA
- A man whose name appears in the graffiti of Parisian sewers.

=== Augustus S.F.X. Van Dusen ===
- "The Problem of Cell 13", Jacques Futrelle
- NHI
- Member of Janni Nemo's pirate crew, he sacrifices his life in order to allow Janni and Broad Arrow Jack to escape from Frank Reade and Tom Swift.

=== Sir Francis Varney ===
- Varney the Vampire, James Malcolm Rymer
- Volume 1 cover
- A vampire and proposed member of a mid-19th century League.

=== Venus ===
- Roman mythology, Under the Hill, Aubrey Beardsley
- NTA, BD
- Queen of Horselburg.

=== Lord Voldemort/Tom Riddle ===
- Harry Potter and the Philosopher's Stone, J. K. Rowling
- Volume 3I2, Volume 3I3
- Referring to himself only as "Tom" (whose middle name "is a marvel" and surname "is a bit of an enigma"), Voldemort attends the Purple Orchestra concert at Hyde Park and is possessed by the spirit of Oliver Haddo once the latter's plan to possess Terner is foiled. It is later revealed that he is an instructor at the unnamed wizarding academy, and in a flashback sequence, it is revealed that he becomes the headmaster at the time of Harry's breakdown. The enraged Harry breaks into his office and kills him, keeping his head in a cage.

== W ==
=== Annie Walker ===
- Coronation Street, Doris Speed
- BD
- An unseen character, she, and her husband Jack Walker, run the Malibu pub on Bayswater Road in London in the 1950s, but after the 1958 election, and the end of INGSOC, she and her husband plan on moving "back up north", ostensibly then becoming the owners of the Rovers Return Inn, the name being significant because "their rovin' days are over" (BD p. 9, pnl.6).

=== Jack Walker ===
- Coronation Street, Arthur Leslie
- BD
- The bartender of the Malibu pub on Bayswater Road in London in the 1950s, but after the 1958 election, and the end of INGSOC, he and his wife (Annie) plan on moving "back up north", ostensibly then becoming the owners of the Rovers Return Inn, the name being significant because "their rovin' days are over" (BD p. 9, pnl.6).

=== Joan Warralson ===
- Worrals of the W.A.A.F., W. E. Johns
- BD
- Joan is a leader of the Warralson group which was formed in 1946 after Mina Murray's apparent defection to the United States. In the LOEG storyline, Captain Warralson is insinuated to have had a sexual relationship with her sidekick 'Frecks'.

=== Alexander Waverly ===
- The Man from U.N.C.L.E., Leo G. Carroll
- BD
- Alexander Waverly is the head of U.N.C.L.E. and was mentioned in the Black Dossier as 'Al' Waverly and was revealed to be a former student at Greyfriars School. It is also mentioned in the graphic novel that when he was constructing U.N.C.L.E., his organization received equipment support from John Night's industry.

=== Michael Westen ===
- Burn Notice, Jeffrey Donovan
- Volume 3
- Disillusioned CIA agent, he is mentioned by Emma Knight as the man who revealed that it was Jimmy Bond who was responsible for the deaths of her father and uncle.

=== General Sir Harold Wharton (aka Big Brother) ===
- The Magnet (1908–1940), Charles Hamilton, Nineteen Eighty-Four, George Orwell
- BD
- Harold Wharron was World War II war hero, leader of the English Socialist Party (Ingsoc), and later dictator of Airstrip One (England) from 1945 to 1951. He married Bessie Bunter, Billy Bunter's little sister. He was secretly assassinated in a plot orchestrated by Gerald O'Brien and Robert Cherry, the former becoming Wharton's successor.
- "Harry Wharton" was the name of one of Billy Bunter's classmates at Greyfriars School. He was Captain of the Lower Fourth Remove and an avid cricketer. Harry Wharton, along with Bob Cherry and Johnny Bull were members of the Famous Five, a tight knit group of students who, along with Billy and certain other schoolmates, had many adventures and defeated many adversaries.

=== Pollyanna Whittier ===
- Pollyanna, Eleanor H. Porter
- Volume 1 issue #2
- One of Miss Coote's students and Griffin's victims.

=== Jack Wright Jr. ===
- Jack Wright series, Luis Senarens
- NHI
- One of the three science heroes hired by Charles Foster Kane to catch Janni Dakkar.

=== Rosemary Woodhouse ===
- Rosemary's Baby, Ira Levin
- Volume 3/2
- Mentioned in name only, she was chosen by Haddo's son to be the mother of the antichrist, but the child died soon after its birth.

=== Bertram Wooster ===
- "Extricating Young Gussie", P. G. Wodehouse
- BD
- Present during the Brinkley Court Affair and was nearly oblivious to the danger of the otherworldly situation.

== Z ==
=== Zanoni ===
- Zanoni, Edward Bulwer-Lytton
- Volume 3I1
- Immortal Chaldean sorcerer and member of the Merlin Society.

=== Monsieur Zenith ===
- The Sexton Blake series, Anthony Skene
- BD
- Albino gentleman thief who duels with Orlando for the sheer thrill of it, and a member of Les Hommes Mysterieux ("The Mysterious Men").

=== Zuki ===
- Original character
- Volume 3II
- A tribute band to Suki Tawdry.

== Comparisons of real and historical characters ==
=== Characters as analogues of historical figures ===
- The Rolling Stones/The Purple Orchestra
- Brian Jones/Basil Thomas
- The Beatles/The Rutles
- Oasis/DriveShaft
- Anne Boleyn/Nan Bollen
- Neal Cassady/Dean Moriarty
- Joan Crawford/Blanche Hudson
- Aleister Crowley/Oliver Haddo a.k.a. Dr. Karswell, Dr. Trelawney, Adrian Marcato, Mocata, Cosmo Gallion, Charles Felton, Hjalmar Poelzig and assumed the role of Lord Voldemort
- Dr. John Dee/Prospero a.k.a. Johannes Suttle
- Edward Kelley/Edward Face
- Queen Elizabeth I/Queen Gloriana I
- Queen Elizabeth II/Queen Gloriana II
- Adolf Hitler/Adenoid Hynkel
- Benito Mussolini/Benzino Napaloni
- William Randolph Hearst/Charles Foster Kane
- King James I/King Jacob I
- Horatio Nelson/Horatio Hornblower
- Jack Kerouac/Sal Paradyse
- Ronnie Kray/Vic Dakin
- Ronnie Kray/Harry Starks
- Ronnie Kray/Harry Flowers
- Ronnie Kray/Dinsdale Piranha
- Reggie Kray/Doug Piranha
- G. Gordon Liddy/F. Gordon Leiter
- Richard Nixon/Max Foster
- George W. Bush/Josiah Bartlet
- Barack Obama/David Palmer
- Mick Jagger/Terner
- Siouxsie and the Banshees/Zuki and the Tawdries
- Lady Gaga/Spooky Tawdry
- Kurt Vonnegut/Kilgore Trout
- Sir Francis Walsingham/Sir Jack Wilton
- Alice Liddell/Alice
- John Sladek/John Thomas
- Michael Moorcock/James Colvin
- Tracy Morgan/Tracy Jordan
- Mark Wahlberg/Vincent Chase
- Donald Trump/Johnny Gentle

=== Fictional characters that are also fictional in the world of the League ===
- Jane Gay
- Superman
- Lord Voldemort
