= The League of Extraordinary Gentlemen =

Comic book series by Alan Moore and Kevin O'Neill

- Cover of Volume I

Publication information
- Publisher: ABC/WildStorm/DC Comics (1999–2007); Top Shelf and Knockabout Comics (2009–2019)
- Genre: Alternate history; Steampunk; Horror; Science fiction; Metafiction; Superhero
- Publication date: 1999–2019
- No. of issues: 21, plus one original graphic novel
- Main characters: Mina Murray; Allan Quatermain; Hawley Griffin; Dr. Henry Jekyll/Mr. Edward Hyde; Captain Nemo; Orlando

Creative team
- Written by: Alan Moore
- Artist: Kevin O'Neill
- Letterer: Bill Oakley

The League of Extraordinary Gentlemen (LoEG) is a multi-genre, crossover comic book series co-created by writer Alan Moore and artist Kevin O'Neill which began in 1999. The comic book spans four volumes, an original graphic novel, and a spin-off trilogy of graphic novellas. According to Moore, the concept behind the series was initially a "Justice League of Victorian England" but he quickly developed it as an opportunity to merge elements from numerous works of fiction into one shared universe akin to those of Marvel and DC Comics.

Volume I and Volume II (released as two six-issue limited series) and the graphic novel Black Dossier were published by the America's Best Comics imprint of DC Comics. After leaving the America's Best imprint, the series moved to Top Shelf and Knockabout Comics, which published Volume III: Century (released as three graphic novellas), the Nemo Trilogy (a spin-off of three graphic novellas centered on the character of Nemo), and Volume IV: The Tempest (originally released as a six-issue limited series).

Elements of Volume I were loosely adapted into a feature film of the same name, released in 2003 and starring Sean Connery in his last live-action role.

== Plot ==
The year is 1898, and Mina Murray is recruited by Campion Bond on behalf of British Intelligence and asked to assemble a league of other extraordinary individuals to protect the interests of the Empire: Captain Nemo, Allan Quatermain, Dr. Jekyll, and Hawley Griffin the Invisible Man. They help stop a gang war between Fu Manchu and Professor Moriarty, nemesis of Sherlock Holmes. Following this they take part in the events of H. G. Wells's The War of the Worlds. Two members of the League (Mina Murray and Allan Quatermain) achieve immortality, and are next seen in an adventure in 1958. This follows events that take place after the fall of the Big Brother government from George Orwell's Nineteen Eighty-Four.

Following this, Mina and Allan team up with fellow immortal Orlando and are shown in an adventure which spans a century, from 1910 to 2009, concerning a plot by evil magicians to create a Moonchild that might well turn out to be the Antichrist. During this adventure Captain Nemo's daughter Janni Dakkar is introduced, and some of her adventures are chronicled subsequently. The final volume of the series ends with an immortal Mina escaping an Earth dominated by magical entities and various alien invasions to live out her immortal life on a space station with Orlando, Jack Nemo (great-grandson of Captain Nemo) and a clone of Mr. Hyde.

== Characters ==
All characters within the series are either pre-existing characters, or are in some way related to one.

=== The League of Extraordinary Gentlemen ===
- Wilhelmina "Mina" Murray
- Allan Quatermain / Allan Quatermain, Jr.
- Prince Dakkar / Captain Nemo I
- Dr. Henry Jekyll / Edward Hyde
- Hawley Griffin / Invisible Man I
- Orlando / Roland
- Thomas Carnacki
- A. J. Raffles
- Emma Night

=== Nemo trilogy ===
- Janni Dakkar / Jenni Diver / Captain Nemo II
- John "Broad Arrow Jack" Ashleigh
- Ishmael
- Professor Augustus S. F. X. Van Dusen
- Hira Dakkar
- Tobias Ishmael
- Luala Ishmael
- Armand Robur
- Cú Chulainn / Hugo Hercules / Hugo Coghlan
- Jack Dakkar / Captain Nemo III
- Tacarigua Ishmael

== Overview of the series ==
In a 1997 interview with Andy Diggle for the now defunct Comics World website, Alan Moore gave the title of the work as "The League of Extraordinary Gentlefolk". Moore changed the name to Gentlemen to better reflect the Victorian era. Simon Bisley was originally going to be the artist for the series before being replaced by Kevin O'Neill.

The Victorian setting allowed Moore and O'Neill to insert "in-jokes" and cameos from many works of Victorian fiction, while also making contemporary references and jibes. The works bear numerous steampunk influences. In the first issue, for example, there is a half-finished bridge to link Britain and France, referencing problems constructing the Channel Tunnel.

Most characters in the series, from the dominatrix schoolmistress Rosa Coote to minor characters such as Inspector Dick Donovan, are either established characters from existing works of fiction or ancestors of the same, to the extent that individuals depicted in crowd scenes in Volume I have been said (both by Moore, and in annotations by Jess Nevins) to be visually designed as the ancestors of the cast of the British soap opera EastEnders. This has lent the series considerable popularity with fans of esoteric Victoriana, who have delighted in attempting to place every character who makes an appearance.

Moore said:

The planet of the imagination is as old as we are. It has been humanity's constant companion with all of its fictional locations, like Mount Olympus and the gods, and since we first came down from the trees, basically. It seems very important, otherwise, we wouldn't have it.

== Publisher change ==
Moore's longstanding, outspoken criticism of DC Comics (stemming in large part from what he perceives as mistreatment at their hands over the rights to Watchmen) made his position with DC-owned subsidiary WildStorm Comics (of which LoEG publisher America's Best Comics is an imprint) tenuous from the start. Moore's initial agreement was with WildStorm owner Jim Lee, who sold his studio to DC after dealing with Moore, but before any of the ABC projects were published. Moore agreed to honor his contracts with Lee, but made it clear that he wished to continue to have no dealings with DC directly.

The fifth issue of the first volume contained an authentic vintage advertisement for a douche with the brand name Marvel Douche. The entire initial print run was destroyed and reprinted because the publisher felt that this could be perceived as an attack on Marvel Comics, DC's main competition.

After several additional complaints over DC interference, Moore decided to wind up his ABC projects, intending to only continue with League (the only title he, with O'Neill, actually owned). He subsequently took offense at inaccurate comments made by the producer of the film version of his V for Vendetta, which stated that the author—who had distanced himself completely from film adaptations of his work, particularly after LXG—had commented favorably on a draft of the script. Moore requested that someone involved with the film's production company—and DC Comics parent company, Warner Bros.—officially retract the comments and apologize. He also claims that his lack of support from DC regarding a minor lawsuit related to the film adaptation of The League of Extraordinary Gentlemen was instrumental in his departure.

When no such apology was forthcoming, both Moore and O'Neill decided to withdraw future volumes of the League from DC in protest. Since the duo was still working on the Black Dossier at the time, it was agreed that it would become the last League project published by DC/WildStorm, with subsequent projects published jointly by Top Shelf Productions and Knockabout Comics in the US and UK respectively, who published both Volume III: Century, and the Nemo Trilogy, as graphic novella trilogies. Top Shelf and Knockabout later released Volume IV: The Tempest first as a six-issue limited series. Reprints of Volumes I-II and the Dossier were published by Vertigo until its shutdown in January 2020.

== World of the League ==
Volume II has an extensive appendix, most of which is filled with an imaginary travelers' account of the alternate universe the League is set in, called The New Traveller's Almanac. This Almanac provides background information, much of which is taken from the pre-existing literary works or mythology and may be difficult to fully appreciate without an esoteric knowledge of literature. It shows the plot of the comic to be just a small section of a world inhabited by what appears to be the entirety of all fiction ever created.

== History of the League ==
Moore's work includes references to previous leagues and suggests there will be others subsequently. In much the same way that the New Traveller's Almanac, an appendix to the trade paperback collection of The League Vol. 2, detailed much of the geography of the League's world, the third volume, The Black Dossier, set out an extensive history of the world of the League and each of its various incarnations, threading together hundreds of disparate works of fiction into a cohesive timeline.

== Awards and recognition ==
The League of Extraordinary Gentlemen won the 1999 UK National Comics Award for Best New Comic (International).

Volume I won the 2000 Bram Stoker Award for Best Illustrated Narrative.

Volume II was nominated for the 2003 award, but lost to The Sandman: Endless Nights. Volume II received the 2003 Eisner Award for Best Finite Series/Limited Series. Time magazine listed Volume II as the 9th best comic of 2003. It was included in the 2005 edition of The Year's Best Graphic Novels, Comics, & Manga. Time also listed Black Dossier as the second-best comic of 2007.

== Influence ==
=== Music ===
The steampunk band Unextraordinary Gentlemen was inspired by this comic.

On "75 Bars (Black's Reconstruction)" off the Rising Down album, Black Thought refers to The Roots as "gentlemen of an extraordinary league".

=== Books ===
Neil Gaiman cited The League of Extraordinary Gentlemen as one of the influences for his award-winning short story "A Study in Emerald".

=== Comics ===
Warren Ellis has cited The League of Extraordinary Gentlemen as an inspiration for his comic Ignition City.

The comic The Chimera Brigade by science-fiction writer Serge Lehman has been regarded by critics as the French reply to The League. It uses proto-superhumans and supervillains from European pulp literature of the early twentieth century, but in a whole different perspective as Lehman is not mainly focused on English literature (as Moore does), mixes those real fictional characters equally with real prominent historical figures and builds a crepuscular alternate history story whose aim is to explain on a historical and psychoanalytical level why all European super-heroes disappeared from popular culture and European collective memory with World War II.

== Annotations ==
Jess Nevins has produced a series of annotations for each volume which are available online and have also been expanded into book form:

- Heroes & Monsters: The Unofficial Companion to the League of Extraordinary Gentlemen. MonkeyBrain Books. 2003. ISBN 1-932265-04-X.
  - Heroes & Monsters (UK) (Titan Books, 2006), ISBN 1-84576-316-5
- A Blazing World: The Unofficial Companion to the Second League of Extraordinary Gentlemen (MonkeyBrain Books, 2004) ISBN 1-932265-10-4
  - A Blazing World (UK) (Titan Books, 2006) ISBN 1-84576-317-3
- Impossible Territories: An Unofficial Companion to the League of Extraordinary Gentlemen The Black Dossier (MonkeyBrain Books, 2008) ISBN 1-932265-24-4

== In other media ==
=== Film ===
The League of Extraordinary Gentlemen appear in a self-titled film, consisting of Allan Quatermain, Captain Nemo, Mina Harker, an original Invisible Man named Rodney Skinner, Dr. Jekyll and Edward Hyde, Dorian Gray, and Tom Sawyer.

A new adaptation of LoEG by 20th Century Fox was in development since 2015. John Davis said that the reboot will be a female-centric film. As of 2022, the film is on track by 20th Century Studios, scheduled to stream on Hulu, with Justin Haythe writing and Don Murphy, who produced the 2003 film, returning as a producer alongside Susan Montford and Erwin Stoff of 3 Arts Entertainment.

=== TV series ===
In 2013, Fox ordered a pilot for the television version of LoEG with Michael Green serving as writer and executive producer, with Erwin Stoff attached to serve in the latter role. Neither Moore nor O'Neill were attached as producers on the series.

=== Interviews ===
The DVD release of The Mindscape of Alan Moore contains an interview with the artist Kevin O'Neill that involves the collaboration with Alan Moore, League of Extraordinary Gentlemen: Century, and his involvement with censorship.

== See also ==
- List of The League of Extraordinary Gentlemen characters
- Philip José Farmer's Wold Newton family
- Kim Newman's Anno Dracula novels
- Albion
