= Basil Fotherington-Tomas =

Fictional character in the Molesworth books

Basil Fotherington-Tomas is a classic fictional character in a series of books by Geoffrey Willans and Ronald Searle featuring the archetypal English prep school boy of the 1950s, Nigel Molesworth, who is the supposed author.

Nigel is a schoolboy at St. Custard's, a fictional (and terrible) prep school located in a carefully unspecified part of England. While Nigel epitomises the worthy inky and earthy school boy, Fotherington-Tomas is the opposite, being an effete and loathed sissy. Fotherington-Tomas is reported to bear a certain resemblance to Little Lord Fauntleroy; while he is also a student at St. Custard's, he is regularly dismissed as a being a "gurl" and a sissy by Molesworth, due to his curly blond locks and his questionable tendency to skip around the school saying such things as "hullo clouds, hullo sky". In several footballing scenes in the books, Fotherington-Tomas plays in goal. He is a surprisingly talented tennis player.

== Other appearances ==
- Fotherington-Tomas also occasionally appears as a name in Private Eye magazine, usually as a pupil of the spoof public school St. Cake's.
- In The League of Extraordinary Gentlemen, Volume III: Century chapter 2, "Paint it Black", we see Fotherington-Tomas in 1969. He is the Brian Jones of the League universe, and was in a band with Turner, the League's Mick Jagger. Shortly before being drowned in his own swimming pool by occultists, Basil engages in sexual acts with Wolfe from the film Villain.
- In the short story collection Back in the USSA by Kim Newman and Eugene Byrne, he appears in the story "Teddy Bear's Picnic" as the analogue of Colonel Kurtz from the film Apocalypse Now. "Hello clouds, hello sky, hello pile of severed human heads."
- Fotherington-Tomas appears in the 1982 ZX Spectrum BASIC manual as an example of a disallowed variable name "because of the hyphen - a space would be fine".

== Books featuring Fotherington-Tomas ==
- Down with Skool (1953)
- How to be Topp (1954)
- Whizz for Atomms (1956)
- Back in the Jug Agane (1959)
- The Lost Diaries of Nigel Molesworth (2022)
