= Back in the USSA =

Short story collection

- Book cover
- Author: Eugene Byrne & Kim Newman
- Cover artist: Arnie Fenner
- Language: English
- Genre: Alternate history
- Publisher: Mark V. Ziesing
- Publication date: September 1997
- Publication place: United Kingdom
- Media type: Hardcover
- Pages: 356
- ISBN: 0-929480-84-8

Back in the USSA is a 1997 collection of seven short stories by English writers Eugene Byrne and Kim Newman, which was published by Mark V. Ziesing Books. The title is a reference to the song "Back in the U.S.S.R." by The Beatles. The stories are linked through their setting, an alternate history of the twentieth century in which the United States experienced a communist Second Revolution in 1917 and became a communist superpower, whereas Russia did not. Six of the stories first appeared in Interzone magazine, and the concluding story in the sequence, "On the Road", was written especially for the collection.

== Background ==
Theodore Roosevelt is re-elected President of the United States as the Progressive Party candidate in 1912. On 19 December 1912, prior to assuming office, Roosevelt is assassinated by Annie Oakley while personally breaking a labor strike at the Chicago Union Stockyards with the help of the Rough Riders. Vice president-elect Charles Foster Kane takes power, and gradually leads the United States into greater levels of oppression, class division and bureaucratic incompetence and corruption – including an earlier entry into World War I in 1914 and the assassination of his rival candidate, Woodrow Wilson, during the 1916 election campaign.

By 1917, the United States is unstable politically and socially, with overwhelming civil unrest stemming from the massive (and seemingly pointless) loss of American lives in the mud of the Western Front and the increasing gap between the wealthy 'robber barons' and the poor working class, and the massive corruption and exploitation this has resulted in. The Socialist Party of America, led by Eugene V. Debs, gains increasing support, and soon the unrest has led to a Second American Revolution and Second American Civil War, following which Kane is ousted from the White House, overthrown, and executed for treason. Afterwards, a new socialist order, led by Debs, takes over. The United States of America becomes the United Socialist States of America.

The early idealism of this change is misplaced, however; upon Debs' death in 1926, power is seized by Al Capone, who rules with a fist of iron, establishing a cult of personality, exiling and executing his political rivals and ruling the country more incompetently than any of the robber barons who were deposed. Gradually, following World War II, the Cold War between the USSA, the United Kingdom and a semi-constitutional monarchist Russian Empire, and the Vietnam War, the USSA begins to stagnate economically and socially, before finally collapsing into bickering nations by 1991, leading to an uncertain future for the former USSA and the rest of the world.

== Stories ==
- In the Air: 1989. As First Secretary, Kurt Vonnegut introduces policies of 'Straight Talking' and 'Getting It Together' into the stagnating United Socialist States. Lowe, a British journalist, arrives in Chicago to meet and interview one of the cultural figureheads of the thawing of repression — Charles Hardin Holley, an underground musician achieving greater popularity in the seemingly more open and relaxed atmosphere of the previously repressive country. Giving their Party Handler (a functionary called Hunt Thompson) the slip, Holley takes Lowe to a speakeasy, where he relates the story of his own political awakening, involving his small-town childhood in the Socialist United States in the 1950s, a chance meeting with two idealistic drifters named Howard Hughes and Jack Kerouac coinciding with the propaganda visit of a troupe of 'war heroes' (including Joseph McCarthy, Charles Lindbergh, Mitch "Duke" Morrison, Lafayette Hubbard, and General Curtis LeMay) and a girl named Peggy Sue.
- Ten Days That Shook The World: 1912–1917. A collection of ten vignettes outlining the foundation of the United Socialist States of America, from the assassination of Theodore Roosevelt in 1912 and the inauguration of Charles Foster Kane in 1913, through the sinking of the Titanic and the American entry into World War I in 1914, and the increasing corruption, class-divisions and injustice that saw the Second American Revolution occur in 1917.
- Tom Joad: 1937. Federal Bureau of Ideology agents Eliot Ness and Melvin Purvis travel to a shanty-town in Nevada, chasing rumours that legendary underground labour activist Tom Joad has been seen. Whilst there, they must contend with a counter-revolutionary conspiracy, the people's unshakeable belief in their hero, and Frank Nitti, Secretary Al Capone's personal enforcer, present to ensure that Joad is caught by any means necessary.
- Teddy Bears' Picnic: 1965–1969. Bob and Terry, two working-class boys from Newcastle and lifelong best friends, enlist in the British Army to go and fight the war against communism in Indo-China. Following brutal training, the two are thrust into the Vietnam War in South-East Asia, where they are captured and imprisoned by Viet Cong guerrillas. Upon their escape, Bob returns to Britain and writes a book chronicling his experiences, which later is turned into a movie — and during the making of the movie, he is forced to confront his new life and the hidden secrets from his terrible experiences that saw Terry shamed and dishonoured.
- Citizen Ed: 1945–1984. The story of Ed Gein — Socialist Hero, local luminary, and horrific serial murderer. For over forty years, Gein and the sheriff of his local town — more than aware of Gein's monstrous perversions and murders — do battle, but the sheriff's attempts to stop Gein's evil are hampered by Party corruption and incompetence and the belief that in a perfect socialist state, a serial killer is an impossibility (this treatment was based upon the actual case of the Ukrainian serial killer Andrei Chikatilo, who was convicted of killing 53 women and children, and the efforts of Soviet detectives in the real-world to capture him).
- Abdication Street: 1972. Cinzia Davidovna Bronstein is a make-up girl at Russia's largest state-owned television station. Charles, the Duke of Cornwall, grand-nephew of King Edward VIII and heir to the throne of the United Kingdom, is in Russia to marry his bride, Grand Duchess Ekaterina, the spoiled daughter of Tsar Nicholas III, and Cinzia has been assigned to provide his make-up for the television coverage. Much is riding on this royal wedding, including the future of democracy in Russia — so when Cinzia and Charles fall in love, this causes more problems.
- On the Road: 1998. A follow-up to 'In the Air', the USSA has split into the Confederation of Independent North American States (similar to the USSR's successor, the Commonwealth of Independent States), vaguely connected nations riddled with institutional corruption and gangsterism. British reporter Lowe, down on his luck, has returned to the former USSA to follow Robert Maxwell's Freedom and Enterprise Roadshow as it travels Route 66, bringing capitalism, Christianity and Cliff Richard to the former USSA.

== Overview ==
The stories are intertextual, featuring actual historical events (like the Vietnam War) and fictional elements from popular culture. Fictional characters interact with real people; President Charles Foster Kane, for example, is the main character from Orson Welles' 1941 motion picture Citizen Kane, whereas Tom Joad is the protagonist of John Steinbeck's The Grapes of Wrath. Hannibal Lecter appears as the head of the Department of Health, and John Rambo helps train Vietnamese Communists. Rambo is played in a film by Raymond Massey. Brigadier Lethbridge-Stewart appears as a British officer in Teddy Bears' Picnic, as do Nigel Molesworth and Basil Fotherington-Thomas.

== Publication history ==
- In the Air: Interzone #43, January 1990
- Ten Days That Shook The World: Interzone #48, June 1990
- Tom Joad: Interzone #65, November 1992
- Teddy Bears' Picnic: Interzone #122-#123, August & September 1997
- Citizen Ed: Interzone #113, November 1996
- Abdication Street: Interzone #105, March 1996
