= Squiddly Diddly =

Hanna-Barbera cartoon character

Squiddly playing the saxophone, the guitar, and the bongos.

Squiddly Diddly is an American fictional anthropomorphic squid created by Hanna-Barbera for his own cartoon segment on The Atom Ant/Secret Squirrel Show in 1965.

== Fictional character biography ==
The round-headed, sailor-hatted Squiddly (who resembles an octopus—albeit with only six tentacles—rather than a squid) is kept captive in an aquatic park known as Bubbleland and resides in a pool with his name on it. Squiddly Diddly is an aspiring musician and entertainer who makes many attempts to escape and attain musical stardom, but he is constantly foiled by Bubbleland's administrator Chief Winchley.

In some episodes, Squiddly Diddly manages to escape, but chooses to return to Bubbleland after finding the outside world to be too harsh. Other times Squiddly and Chief Winchley have to work together to solve problems in Bubbleland. The cartoons show people applauding Squiddly Diddly's musical talents, but they often depict terrified people who mistakenly believed that octopuses are hostile.

== List of episodes ==
=== Season 1 (1965–66) ===
No. overall	No. in season	Title	Original release date
1	1	"Way Out Squiddly"	October 2, 1965
Two aliens kidnap Squiddly and take him for a wild ride in their spaceship.
2	2	"Show Biz Squid"	October 9, 1965
Overshadowed by dolphins, Squiddly leaves to become a big star.
3	3	"The Canvas Back Squid"	October 16, 1965
Squiddly is hired to fill in for a pro-wrestler.
4	4	"Nervous Service"	October 23, 1965
Squiddly is enlisted into the Navy.
5	5	"Westward Ha!"	October 30, 1965
Squiddly goes to the west to imitate his favorite western shows.
6	6	"Sea Grunt"	November 6, 1965
Squiddly is cast in a TV show.
7	7	"Chief Cook and Bottle Washer"	November 13, 1965
Squiddly has too many chores, so he runs away and joins the pirates.
8	8	"Squid on the Skids"	November 20, 1965
Squiddly tries to woo a female squid.
9	9	"Double Trouble"	November 27, 1965
Squiddly unexpectedly gets popular at a costume party.
10	10	"Squid Kid"	December 4, 1965
A little boy takes Squiddly home with him.
11	11	"Booty and the Beast"	December 11, 1965
Squiddly and Chief Winchley try to find buried treasure.
12	12	"Clowning Around"	December 18, 1965
Squiddly runs away to join the circus.
13	13	"Surprise Prize"	December 25, 1965
Squiddly and Winchley go to an island, where Squiddly is worshipped as a god.
14	14	"Naughty Astronaut"	January 1, 1966
Squiddly is mistaken for an alien, and is chased by the army.
15	15	"The Ghost Is Clear"	January 8, 1966
Squiddly Diddly babysits a young ghost named Wilbur.
16	16	"Lucky Ducky"	January 15, 1966
A Tasmanian duck arrives in Bubbleland and tries to manipulate Squiddly into giving him his own tank.
17	17	"Foxy Seal"	January 22, 1966
After being tricked into leaving Bubbleland by Slippery Seal, Squiddly helps protect a fox from being hunted.
18	18	"Squiddly Double Diddly"	January 29, 1966
Squiddly has been replaced by a foreign spy to obtain the blueprints for Bubbleland.
19	19	"Hollywood Folly"	February 5, 1966
Squiddly goes to Hollywood to become a star.
20	20	"One Black Knight"	February 12, 1966
Squiddly is swindled into an inheritance of a castle haunted by the Black Knight's ghost -- the butler would have him believe so.

=== Season 2 (1966) ===
No. overall	No. in season	Title	Original release date
21	1	"Yo Ho Ho"	September 10, 1966
Squiddly finds a time machine and travels back to Captain Kidney's pirate days.
22	2	"Phoney Fish"	September 17, 1966
Two criminals named Knuckles and Tiny pose as snorkel fish in order to rob the Bubbleland box office.
23	3	"Gnatman"	September 24, 1966
Squiddly Diddly and Chief Winchley each pose as the superhero Gnatman in order to fight crime.
24	4	"Robot Squid"	October 1, 1966
Winchley replaces Squiddly with a robot version.
25	5	"Jewel Finger"	October 8, 1966
Squiddly accidentally swallows a precious pearl necklace hidden by a thief in Bubbleland.
26	6	"Baby Squidder"	October 15, 1966
Squiddly must keep a wandering boy safe.

== Voice cast ==
- Paul Frees - Squiddly Diddly
- John Stephenson - Chief Winchley

== Home video ==
On November 3, 2015, Warner Archive released The Secret Squirrel Show: The Complete Series on DVD in region 1 as part of their Hanna–Barbera Classics Collection. This release contains all the Squiddly Diddly shorts.

The episode "Way Out Squiddly" is also available on the DVD Saturday Morning Cartoons Vol. 1.

== In other languages ==
- Brazilian Portuguese: Lula Lelé
- Spanish: El pulpo Manotas
- French: Squiddly la pieuvre
- Dutch: Inky de inktvis
- Italian: Squiddly Diddly
- German: Squiddly Diddly
- Japanese: Tako no Roku chan
- Tunisian Arabic: قرينط الشلواش (Qrīnaṭ il-šalwāš)
- Serbian: Сима Сипа (Sima Sipa)

== Other appearances ==
Squiddly Diddly (middle right) participates in the Superstar Olympics. From Hanna-Barbera Presents #6.

- In 1966, Hanna-Barbera Records released Squiddly Diddly's Surfin' Surfari on LP.
- Squiddly Diddly appears in the TV-movie Yogi's Ark Lark and its sequel series, Yogi's Gang. In both appearances, the character was voiced by Don Messick.
- Squiddly Diddly made a lone comic book appearance in 1966, as a back-up feature in the only issue of Secret Squirrel, published by Gold Key Comics, and again in 1996, courtesy of Hanna-Barbera Presents #6, published by Archie Comics.
- Squiddly and Chief Winchley appeared in Yogi's Treasure Hunt.
- Squiddly Diddly made two appearances on Yo Yogi!. First, he appeared in the episode "Mall or Nothing" where he is juggling for the Mall-a-thon. Then, he made a cameo in the episode "The Big Snoop" where he is amongst those looking for Super Snooper when he ends up kidnapped. In the former episode, he was voiced by Don Messick.
- In the British comedy Only Fools and Horses Christmas Special 1989 "The Jolly Boys' Outing", Squiddly Diddly was cited by Del Boy as the reason for the failure of his seafood stall, since people were unwilling to consume creatures they had become fond of.
- Squiddly Diddly has been seen on HBO's The Ricky Gervais Show, where the character is involved in a few scripts, including being side by side with a killer octopus and giving Karl Pilkington a rectal examination.
- Squiddly Diddly appears in the Harvey Birdman, Attorney at Law episodes "SPF", "Gone Efficien...t" and "The Death of Harvey". Chief Winchley makes a cameo in "Juror in Court".
- Squiddly Diddly made a cameo in a 2012 MetLife commercial entitled "Everyone".
- Squiddly Diddly's body is shown in Janni Nemo's office in the 2015 graphic novel Nemo: River of Ghosts, written by Alan Moore and illustrated by Kevin O'Neill.
- Squiddly Diddly made a cameo as an animatronic in the Dexter's Laboratory episode "Chubby Cheese".
- Simon Cowell has two dogs named Squiddly and Diddly, a catchphrase he has often used on reality TV shows over the years.
- Squiddly Diddly appears several times in Mark Russell's 2018 comic book Exit, Stage Left!: The Snagglepuss Chronicles.
- Squiddly Diddly makes a cameo in the Wacky Races episode "Wacklantis" as various sea life are summoned by the king of Atlantis.
- Squiddly Diddly makes two cameo appearances in Scoob!, as part of a mural on the side of the building and on a billboard for Bubbleland.
- Squiddly Diddly makes an appearance as a silhouette in the 2020 Animaniacs revival segment "Suffragette City".
- Squiddly Diddly appears in Jellystone!, voiced by Niccole Thurman. While the original promo image presented Squiddly as a male, the character is female in the actual series. She owns a music store. Chief Winchley does not appear nor is mentioned, and neither does Bubbleland.
- Squiddly Diddly is the star of his own poem, "The Story of Squiddly Diddly", which was written by Theodora Shilliton and won at 2021's National Poetry Day. The poem involves the titular squid as he tries to stop people from polluting the ocean while befriending a tuna, a sea turtle, and a sea cow along the way.
