= Colonel Blimp =

Cartoon character

"Security by Col. Blimp" (c. 1930s)

Colonel Blimp is a cartoon character created by New Zealand cartoonist David Low. The character was first drawn for Lord Beaverbrook's Evening Standard in April 1934. Blimp is a pompous, irritable, and jingoistic British colonel who is identifiable by his walrus moustache and common use of the interjection "Gad, Sir!" Low claimed that he developed the character, which was named after a term for non-rigid airships, after overhearing two military officers in a Victorian Turkish bath declare that cavalry officers should be entitled to wear their spurs inside tanks.

== Character ==
Blimp often issues proclamations from a Victorian Turkish bath, delivered to a cartoon version of David Low, while wrapped in a towel and occasionally brandishing a mundane weapon to emphasize his passion. Red-faced with rage and emotion, he makes confused pronouncements on the issues of the day. Blimp's reasoning and phrasing is typically contradictory, as though upon starting the sentence he did not know how the sentence was to end. His initial words always began with a catchphrase, for instance: "Gad, Sir! Mr Lansbury is right. The League of Nations should insist on peace — except of course in the case of war," or: "Gad, Sir! Lord Bunk is right. The government is marching over the edge of an abyss, and the nation must march solidly behind them." Blimp's comments are not infrequently directed at the opinions of Lord Beaverbrook, the owner of the newspaper in which the cartoon appeared. Indeed some cartoons begin with Blimp stating "Gad, Sir! Lord Beaverbrook is right."

Blimp was "intended to portray all [Low] disliked in British politics - extreme isolationism, impatience with common people and their concerns, and little enthusiasm of democracy". Although Low described Blimp as "a symbol of stupidity", he lessened the insult by adding that "stupid people are quite nice".

== Legacy ==
The character has earned a legacy as a clichéd phrase – reactionary opinions are often characterised as "Colonel Blimp" statements. Frank Percy Crozier referred to Colonel Blimp in his anti-war book The Men I Killed (1937). George Orwell and Tom Wintringham made especially extensive use of the term "Blimps" to refer to this type of military officer, Orwell in his articles and Wintringham in his books How to Reform the Army and People's War. In his 1941 essay "The Lion and the Unicorn", Orwell referred to two important sub-sections of the middle class, one of which was the military and imperialistic middle class, nicknamed the Blimps, and characterised by the "half-pay (i.e retired) colonel with his bull neck and diminutive brain". He added that they had been losing their vitality during the past thirty years, "writhing impotently under the changes that were happening". E. M. Forster used the term "Colonel Blimp" to describe Britons with a low opinion of Indian culture. Herbert Read also used the term to describe people who were strongly hostile to modern art. The history book Roads to Ruin: The Shocking History of Social Reform (1950) by E. S. Turner was ironically dedicated to "Colonel Blimp", and reprinted a Low cartoon of Blimp next to the dedication: Turner's book described traditionalist politicians who opposed humanitarian reforms as "Colonel Blimp figures".

The term "Blimp" continues to be referenced from time to time. In a 1994 article published in The New York Review of Books, John Banville recalled a televised exchange between an elderly lady and Kingsley Amis as "an endearing moment, in which one glimpsed the warm and funny man that Amis used to be before he decided, some time in the 1960s, to turn himself into a literary Colonel Blimp". In a 2006 book, historian Christopher Clark used the term "blimpish" to characterise the Prussian Field Marshal von Mollendorf (1724–1816), who distinguished himself as an officer in the Seven Years' War but whose conservatism and opposition to military reform were considered to have contributed to Prussia's defeat in the Battle of Jena in 1806. In his review of Garner's Modern American Usage, David Foster Wallace referred to the "Colonel Blimp's rage" of prescriptivist journalists like William Safire. The graphic novel series The League of Extraordinary Gentlemen, which depicts numerous literary characters interacting with each other, includes Horatio Blimp as an overconfident British Army major who commands the initial strike against the Martian invaders of H. G. Wells' The War of the Worlds.In Foyle's War the assistant chief commissioner refers to himself as having been "a Colonel Blimp of the very worst sort" whilst apologising.

== Film ==
In 1943, Michael Powell and Emeric Pressburger wrote, produced, and directed the motion picture The Life and Death of Colonel Blimp (1943). Filmed during wartime, the movie portrayed the life of an admirable British officer named Clive Candy. The story encouraged the audience to accept that although the officer was honorable, with time his opinions had become outdated, and that winning a modern war required irregular means. The British film featured Roger Livesey in the title role, Deborah Kerr, and Anton Walbrook. The "Blimp" character was not actually called "Blimp" other than in the title, nor did he die.

== See also ==
- Horatio Blimp
- Sir Bufton Tufton
- Gammon
