= The New Traveller's Almanac =

- Short story by Alan Moore
- Language: English
- Genre: Fictional encyclopedia

Publication
- Published in: The League of Extraordinary Gentlemen, Volume II
- Publisher: WildStorm (DC Comics)
- Media type: Comic
- Publication date: 2002–2003

"The New Traveller's Almanac" is a series of writings included in the back of all six issues of The League of Extraordinary Gentlemen, Volume II, covering the timeline and the world of The League of Extraordinary Gentlemen.

The six issues covered the British Isles, Continental Europe, the Americas, Africa and the Middle East, Asia and the Australias, and the Polar Regions. In the Volume II collection, the Almanac was collected into a single 46-page document. All of the information from it was drawn from pre-existing literary sources (such as Shakespearean plays or the Cthulhu Mythos).

The Almanac is written in the style of a declassified document from MI5 taken from a government library. It is notable in introducing characters such as Prospero and Orlando, who will later become main characters in The Black Dossier and Volume Three. The travel reports, mostly compiled from log entries by Mina Murray, Prospero and Captain Nemo (and occasionally quote from them, including Prospero's log written entirely in iambic pentameter), scan over every part of the world in several chapters.

Buried in the prose are various hints at portions of the story not covered by the graphic novel portion of the volume, such as the adventures of earlier leagues, Murray's correspondence with Sherlock Holmes, Murray and Allan Quatermain's search for the fountain of youth known as the "Pool of Fire and Life" or "the Fire of Life", and their investigation of H. P. Lovecraft-style phenomena and parallel universes for the British government.

The narrator is at times intentionally ignorant, obfuscating literary references and plot points so that they serve as easter eggs. For example, the narrator refers to Murray's visit to "an elderly bee-keeper who resided near the seaside cove of Fulworth" (in "The Adventure of the Lion's Mane" Sherlock Holmes retires to Fulworth to keep bees).
