= The League of Extraordinary Gentlemen, Volume III: Century =

Comic book by Alan Moore and Kevin O'Neill

- Early cover art for Century #1, by Kevin O'Neill

Publication information
- Publisher: Top Shelf Productions (US); Knockabout Comics (UK)
- Format: Limited series
- Genre: Superhero
- Publication date: May 2009 – June 2012
- No. of issues: 3
- Main character(s): Mina Murray; Allan Quatermain; Orlando; A. J. Raffles; Thomas Carnacki

Creative team
- Written by: Alan Moore
- Artist: Kevin O'Neill
- Letterer: Todd Klein
- Colorist: Ben Dimagmaliw

The League of Extraordinary Gentlemen, Volume III: Century is the third volume of The League of Extraordinary Gentlemen, written by Alan Moore and illustrated by Kevin O'Neill. Co-published by Top Shelf Productions and Knockabout Comics in the US and UK respectively, Century was published in three distinct 72-page squarebound comics.

== Structure ==
The third volume of The League of Extraordinary Gentlemen is a 216-page epic spanning almost a hundred years and entitled 'Century'. Divided into three 72-page chapters, each a self-contained narrative to avoid frustrating cliff-hanger delays between episodes, it takes place in three distinct eras, building to an apocalyptic conclusion occurring in the present, twenty-first century. The characters and themes thread through all three episodes, in which the characters of Mina Harker, Allan Quatermain and Orlando feature prominently, alongside W. Somerset Maugham's Aleister Crowley-analogue Oliver Haddo and Iain Sinclair's London-bound time traveller Andrew Norton, from Slow Chocolate Autopsy.

Moore has stated that the move from DC Comics/WildStorm/America's Best Comics has been liberating, and that the work on Century is "freed from the conventions of boys' adventure comics", allowing for a work that is "a lot more atmospheric", building slowly to "a tremendously bloody climax".

== Chapter 1: What Keeps Mankind Alive? ==
The story begins in 1910, twelve years after the first and second volumes. On Lincoln Island, the dying Captain Nemo asks his estranged teenage daughter, Janni Dakkar, to become the new captain of the Nautilus after his death, but she refuses and leaves his side. She stows away on a passing ship, which sails to London, and taking the name "Jenny Diver" she gets a job at a wharf-side hotel. Jack MacHeath – portrayed as a combination of The Threepenny Opera protagonist MacHeath and real-life serial killer Jack the Ripper – arrives in London on the same ship and murders a prostitute.

Allan Quatermain and Mina Murray (who have both become immortal after bathing in the Fire of Youth) continue to work for the British Government as part of the League of Extraordinary Gentlemen, along with new members Orlando, Thomas Carnacki and A. J. Raffles. Carnacki has frequent visions of an upcoming disaster where many people will die, and a cult plotting the creation of a "Moonchild" destined to initiate Armageddon. He recognises one of the men in his visions as paranormal detective Simon Iff, and the League go to a gentlemen's club Carnacki and Iff regularly attend to learn more about him. One of the club's members, Zanoni, reveals that Iff was an associate of Oliver Haddo, an occultist who died in 1908 but whose cult remains active. Mina and Allan later discuss the situation with Mycroft Holmes, the head of British Intelligence, who advises them to investigate the Haddo cult's headquarters near King's Cross railway station and suggests MacHeath (whom British Intelligence knows is Jack the Ripper) will be responsible for the deaths Carnacki foresaw.

At King's Cross, Mina and Raffles meet time traveller Andrew Norton, but he offers little help and speaks almost entirely in riddles referencing events in the far future. As he disappears to another time, Norton promises Mina they will meet again in 1969. Meanwhile, Orlando, Allan and Carnacki break into the Haddo cult's headquarters, but are caught by the leader Karswell Trelawney. When they confront the cult about their plans, Trelawney claims what Carnacki has been seeing is either inaccurate or a future event yet to happen, but Carnacki inadvertently gives them a crucial piece of information by mentioning the name of a woman who has yet to join the cult. Elsewhere, Janni is mistreated by the staff and guests of the hotel, but when Ishmael appears with news of Nemo's death, she still refuses to join the Nautilus crew and demands he leave. That evening, Janni is raped by a group of drunk men, and is later aided to her room by Suky Tawdry (another character from The Threepenny Opera). Distraught and eager for revenge, she decides to fulfill Nemo's dying wishes and fires a flare to summon the Nautilus, which is docked nearby.

The next day, MacHeath is brought to the gallows to be hanged without trial, as Mycroft is worried that a trial might reveal the involvement of the 14th Earl of Gurney (the protagonist of the 1968 play The Ruling Class) in the original Ripper murders and cause a scandal. As MacHeath sings his final plea from the gallows, the Nautilus (now painted black and with Nemo's skull nailed to the forecastle) emerges from the Thames and destroys every building on the waterfront. The crew descend to loot and murder while Janni – accepting the role of captain – orders them to kill the men who raped her. Mycroft receives news of the Nautilus attacking the London docks, as well as a letter from the Earl of Gurney confessing to all the Ripper crimes, so he orders for MacHeath to be freed without charge and sends the League to the docks. When they arrive, Orlando fends off the pirates with Excalibur, and amidst the chaos Mina runs into Janni, who recognises her from her previous visit to Lincoln Island in 1898. As the Nautilus departs, Janni invites Mina to join the crew should she ever decide to forsake government work. Mina berates the League for their reckless actions, and as they leave the ruined docks, MacHeath and Suky sing an altered version of What Keeps Mankind Alive? mocking the League for their failures.

== Chapter 2: Paint It Black ==
In 1969, around eleven years after the events of The League of Extraordinary Gentlemen: Black Dossier, members of Oliver Haddo's cult murder Basil Thomas, a member of the rock band "Purple Orchestra". Mina, Orlando and Allan no longer work for the British Government and have spent the years since the events of The Black Dossier away from Britain, but the sorcerer Prospero summons them back to investigate Basil's murder. The Nautilus drops the League off at the White Cliffs of Dover, and returning to London they settle into their new base underneath a nightclub (which Mina had planned to use as the headquarters for a superhero team she tried to assemble in 1964). They speculate that the Haddo cult may be trying to create the Antichrist, following a previous failed attempt to do so in New York two years before. That night, Mina has a nightmare in which she is haunted by Haddo's spirit, leaving her disturbed and terrified. Meanwhile, mob leader Vince Dakin hires Jack Carter to search for Basil's killer as well, and Carter's investigations lead him to an occult bookshop owned by Kosmo Gallion, the current leader of the Haddo cult.

The next morning, the League meet with Jerry Cornelius, who tells them that Andrew Norton will reappear at King's Cross. When Norton appears, he continues to speak almost exclusively in cryptic riddles referencing works of fiction and events in the future, but he reveals that Haddo's spirit has been transferring into other bodies for years, including Karswell Trelawney and Kosmo Gallion, and directs the League's investigation towards a nightclub called the Flying Cylinder. Before leaving, Norton warns that by the time they meet again in 2009, the League will be "too late" to stop Haddo. Elsewhere, Gallion discusses the Haddo cult with Purple Orchestra's lead singer Terner, and promises him to become Haddo's new host body. At the Flying Cylinder, Mina meets and questions Gallion's partner Julia, who takes her back to her flat. They have sex, and Julia gives Mina a "tadukic acid diethylamide" pill.

Purple Orchestra holds a concert at Hyde Park in honor of Basil (which parallels the real-world death of The Rolling Stones member Brian Jones and the subsequent tribute concert), in which Terner reads poetry and sings a song based on "Sympathy for the Devil". From Julia's information, Mina learns that Haddo's spirit plans to transfer from Gallion to Terner at the concert, and she, Orlando and Allan go to Hyde Park to stop the ritual. Once they arrive, however, she realises that the actual ritual is occurring at Gallion's bookshop. While Allan and Orlando race to the shop, Mina stays at the concert and takes the tadukic acid pill, which gives her surreal hallucinations. Her spirit leaves her body and fights Haddo on the astral plane, but he overpowers her and reveals that the League's interference will not affect the planned birth of the Antichrist. At the bookshop, Jack Carter kills Gallion before the ritual can be completed. With his plan gone awry, Haddo is forced to enter the body of a man named Tom (who is heavily implied to be a younger Voldemort). Purple Orchestra releases a flock of bats into the crowd, and as Mina returns to her body she is driven insane by a hallucination of the bats chanting "Remember me?". She is taken away in an ambulance before Allan and Orlando can get to her, while Tom - now under Haddo's control - goes to King's Cross and passes through Platform 9 3/4.

Eight years later, in 1977, Allan and the female Orlando have still not reunited with Mina, and sit sulking in a bar. Allan has relapsed into drug abuse, and growing bored of his self-pity Orlando leaves him, planning to join the army once her gender changes again.

== Chapter 3: Let It Come Down ==
In 2009, the male Orlando is serving in the British Army and stationed in Q'mar. He receives a medal after apparently surviving a massacre, but he privately confesses to a fellow immortal soldier – Colonel Cuckoo – that he actually committed the massacre himself in a moment of violent madness. Returning home to London, which has become a dystopia rife with poverty and depression, Orlando's gender switches to female. Prospero – outraged by the League's continuous failure to stop Oliver Haddo – appears and reveals the Antichrist has already been born, therefore the League only has a limited time to prevent Armageddon. In desperation, Orlando approaches the elderly Emma Night, the current head of MI5, and offers her the secret to immortality in exchange for help finding Mina. After speaking with Night she is briefly reunited with Allan, who has become a homeless drug addict, but he panics and flees before she can talk to him.

Mina is staying in a psychiatric hospital run by the descendants of Rosa Coote, where she is medicated on strong sedatives. Orlando gets her out of the hospital and takes her off her medication, and as Mina's memories return, she remembers that she should meet up with Andrew Norton again. They try to convince Allan to help them, but he refuses and claims he no longer wants to live a heroic life. When Norton reappears at King's Cross, he guides Mina and Orlando through the hidden Platform 9 3/4, where they find the wreckage of a magical train full of decaying corpses. He explains the train is operated magically and its track leads to the school the Antichrist came from, but he himself is unable to join them. The train travels across Britain's underlying dream realm and stops at the ruins of a school for wizards. As Mina and Orlando search the ruins, flashbacks show the events leading up to the school's destruction. As a baby, the Antichrist (who is heavily implied to be Harry Potter but never referred to by name) was scarred with the mark of the beast on his forehead, and throughout the child's adolescence, Oliver Haddo tried to manipulate him into accepting his destiny by staging a series of adventures set in the school and portraying a nemesis for him to fight. The revelation of his true destiny drove the Antichrist insane and he went on a destructive rampage, destroying the school and killing all the staff and pupils. When Mina and Orlando return to London, Prospero urges them to confront the Antichrist and use Excalibur to signal for reinforcements. Meanwhile, Allan buys a gun and prepares to commit suicide, but ultimately decides not to.

The Antichrist is hiding in an invisible house, where he angrily rants at Haddo's severed head, which is still alive. When Mina and Orlando arrive to confront him, he emerges as a giant covered in eyes and begins to trigger the end of the world. As Orlando battles him, Excalibur reacts by summoning a light in the sky, which is seen by everyone in the world. Out at sea, arch-terrorist Jack Nemo (the great-grandson of the original Captain Nemo) sees the light, and deciding to abandon his terrorist actions in Pakistan, he orders his crew to return to Lincoln Island, where a new Nautilus is being constructed. Back in London, Allan arrives to help Mina and Orlando, shooting the Antichrist with a futuristic weapon. The Antichrist is unaffected by the blast and shoots a bolt of magical lightning from his penis, which kills Allan. An enigmatic woman resembling Mary Poppins descends from the sky and destroys the Antichrist by transforming him into a chalk drawing on the road, which washes away in the rain. Haddo's head states Armageddon will still happen, but now Mina is destined to initiate it. Before he can explain further the woman takes him and ascends back into the sky.

Emma Night arrives, accompanied by two women who have left MI5, as she has now. They escort Mina and Orlando to Africa, where Allan's body is buried in an existing grave dating back to when he originally faked his death in 1885. As they depart for the Fire of Youth, Night asks how an immortal is able to cope with eternal life, and Mina simply tells her that one must continue to live.

== Minions of the Moon ==
Each chapter of Century is accompanied by an episode of a text-story entitled Minions of the Moon, written in the style of a 1960s "new wave" science fiction story. Moore writes as "John Thomas", and in the style of John Sladek.

=== Chapter One: Into the Limbus ===
The first segment, Love amongst the Troglodytes, is set in Africa in 1236 BC. It details how Orlando (as a young woman named "Bio") first became immortal by bathing in the Fire of Youth, and the time she spent with a tribe of primitive immortals who live around the fire. One immortal showed her the remains of a mysterious black object, a monolith from 2001: A Space Odyssey. The second segment, In the Wake of the Black Nautilus, is set a few hours after the Nautilus' attack on East London in 1910. Mina Murray is left disturbed by her earlier encounter with Janni Dakkar, and is fearful of how her own immortality will affect her in years to come. Allan Quatermain pacifies her with a romantic gesture, promising to give her the "Moon above Soho".

The next three segments are all set in 1964. Her Long, Adorable Lashes shows Allan in a sexual relationship with the female Orlando, and reveals Orlando to be the true identity of O, the protagonist of Pauline Reage's Story of O. Requiem for a Space-Wizard begins the main story, and shows superhero Captain Universe giving his ally "Vull the Invisible" a tour of his newly acquired headquarters. All of the while he privately speculates what sort of person Vull is beneath his invisibility, but when Vull leaves the headquarters he removes his invisibility helmet, revealing himself to be Mina in disguise. In Coming Forth by Day, Mina, the alien "Galley-Wag" and his two Dutch Dolls are summoned to the Blazing World, where Prospero sets them the task of going to the Moon and stopping a civil war between two Lunar races. They travel to the Moon in an airship called the Rose of Nowhere, and during the journey Mina and the Galley-Wag see the corpse of Professor Moriarty, still clutching the Cavorite engine from the first volume and frozen in a block of ice in orbit around Earth.

=== Chapter 2: The Distance from Tranquility ===
The first segment, Escape from Nowhere, is set in outer space in 1896, and shows the Galley-Wag escaping from a spaceship run by pink-skinned aliens, where he was kept as a slave for many years. The second segment, Glass Shirts and Goose-Bones, is set in 1964 and continues the story of Mina and the Galley-Wag's Lunar journey. Arriving on the Moon's surface, Mina finds several strange objects from different time periods, including an Anglo-Saxon crown and an Elizabethan doll, and suspects that they may have landed on the "Limbus of the Moon", where lost things accumulate. Babes in Toyland continues from Escape from Nowhere, as the Galley-Wag's escape pod flies to Earth and crashes in the Arctic Circle, where he is found by Frankenstein's monster. He is nursed back to health in Toyland (a settlement inhabited by sentient, toy-like automatons), and is accepted into their community. The Monster, who rules Toyland alongside his automaton wife Olympia, gives the two Dutch Dolls to the Galley-Wag as companions.

A Long Way from Baltimore continues from Glass shirts and Goose-Bones. Under cover of invisibility, Mina spies on an American Lunar base, where the astronauts speculate and argue about the origins of a colony of giant ants which have been attacking them. In Skulls and Amazons, the Galley-Wag pilots the Rose of Nowhere across the Moon's surface, observing the behaviour of the giant ants and finding a vast field of human skulls. In the sixth and final segment, Give Me the Moonlight, Give Me the Girls..., the crew reunite with Mina and show her the various alien species they have seen, including the Clangers and their Soup Dragon. They discover a citadel populated by naked warrior women called Myrmidons, who explain that a plague starting in 1901 killed their entire male population, and the skulls are of their deceased. To keep their race alive, the women harvest sperm cells from the frozen body of a human man, whom Mina recognises as Professor Selwyn Cavor.

=== Chapter 3: Saviours ===
The first segment, A Cricket-Cap of Thorns, is set in 1901, shortly after the events of H. G. Wells' The First Men in the Moon. Stranded on the Moon and confronted by several Selenites (the giant ants from the previous chapter), Professor Cavor kills himself by stepping out of the Moon's atmosphere. The Selenites come to worship his frozen corpse as a deity. The remaining five segments are set in 1964 and conclude the main story. A Harsh Mistress reveals the war Mina and the Galley-Wag were sent to prevent began when the Myrmidons stole Cavor's body from the Selenites, and as they prepare for battle the Myrmidon leader Maza mounts a reptilian steed called a "Nak-Kar", and mentions the presence of a celestial being who observes everything the Myrmidons do. In Moonbeams, Home in a Jar, three astronauts in the American lunar base see the Myrmidon army riding Nak-Kars and charging into battle against the Selenites, but they decide not to report it to base command because they are growing cannabis inside the base and fear the repercussions of their secret being discovered.

In A Moonlight Flit, the Rose of Nowhere hovers over the battlefield, and the Dutch Dolls distract the Selenites by suspending Cavor's body from a rope. Hastily devising a plan to end the war, Mina threatens to kill Maza unless she follows her demands. In A Sea of Crises, Maza orders the Myrmidon army to cease their attack and announces they will return Cavor to the Selenites, because an alternative sperm source has been found. The Rose of Nowhere crew retrieve Professor Moriarty's corpse from its orbit around Earth and bring it to the Moon. The story concludes with The Sins of the Father, in which the Myrmidons extract intact sperm cells from Moriarty and successfully fertilise donated egg cells. Maza thanks the crew for their help in saving her race and rewards them with a banquet, but as they celebrate Mina privately regrets this solution and dreads the possible future repercussions.

== Release and reception ==
The three volumes of the graphic novel were scheduled to be released in April/May for three successive years from 2009 to 2011. 1910 was released in April 2009, 1969 was released July 2011, and 2009 was released in June 2012.

Reception to Century has been mixed to positive. Chad Nevett called the book "flat out fun to read". Other critics such as Chris Sims have criticized the growing amount of indiscernible references as a hindrance to the plot elements.
