= Radio Malt =

Early to mid-20th century brand of malt extract

Radio Malt was an early to mid-20th-century brand of malt extract preparation that followed the Minadex trend. It is produced by British Drug Houses; it contains vitamin A, aneurine hydrochloride, riboflavin, and calciferol. The contents were sickly sweet, with a consistency between molasses and treacle. It is much loved by George Molesworth ("Molesworth 2"), brother of the classic schoolboy character Nigel Molesworth.

Radio Malt was being sold in the UK by the mid-1920s and was studied at this time as a treatment for rickets. In India, it was trademarked in 1942.

A favourite of film producer and politician David Puttnam, Radio Malt was often used in English boarding schools in an attempt to change skinny young girls into prettier roundness and given to Post-World War II children to give them more bulk.

== See also ==
- Extract of malt
