= The League of Extraordinary Gentlemen: Nemo Trilogy =

2013–15 comic book series by Alan Moore and Kevin O'Neill

Publication information
- Publisher: Top Shelf Productions (US); Knockabout Comics (UK)
- Format: Limited series
- Genre: Superhero
- Publication date: March 2013 – March 2015
- No. of issues: 3
- Main character(s): Janni Dakkar; Tom Swift; Broad Arrow Jack; Adenoid Hynkel; Ayesha

Creative team
- Written by: Alan Moore
- Artist: Kevin O'Neill
- Letterer: Todd Klein
- Colorist: Ben Dimagmaliw

The League of Extraordinary Gentlemen: Nemo Trilogy is a volume in The League of Extraordinary Gentlemen series, written by Alan Moore and illustrated by Kevin O'Neill. Co-published by Top Shelf Productions and Knockabout Comics in the US and UK respectively, Nemo was published in three distinct 72-page squarebound comics.

== Structure ==
The Nemo trilogy is a 216-page story arc spanning fifty years, divided into three 72-page chapters, each a self-contained narrative to avoid frustrating cliff-hanger delays between episodes, that takes place in three distinct eras. The series focuses on Janni Dakkar, daughter of Captain Nemo, introduced in Chapter 1 of The League of Extraordinary Gentlemen, Volume III: Century.

In the first chapter she is in a race to Antarctica in 1925. In the second chapter, set in 1941, she has to invade Berlin to rescue her daughter Hira and son-in-law Armand Robur from Adenoid Hynkel's Nazi-forces. In the third chapter, set in 1975, she embarks on the Amazon in what may be her final voyage.

=== Nemo: Heart of Ice ===
Nemo: Heart of Ice follows Janni Dakkar to Antarctica in 1925. The story opens with Nemo and her crew robbing a great treasure from Ayesha, who appears to have great influence over Charles Foster Kane. Nemo travels to Antarctica as her father once did on a trip that drove him mad. Kane recruits Frank Reade Jr., Jack Wright, and Tom Swift to retrieve Ayesha's treasure from Nemo. The trio follow her to Antarctica where they encounter a pit that leads to Yuggoth, a mysterious white giant and an ice sphinx. The chase ends at the Mountains of Madness, where clever trickery on the part of Augustus S. F. X. Van Dusen puts Swyfte and Reade in the path of a Shoggoth (which might also be the monster from The Thing) that consumes Reade and drives Swyfte mad.

=== Nemo: The Roses of Berlin ===
This story takes place in 1941. After Janni Dakkar and Broad Arrow Jack's daughter Hira and her husband Armand Robur are captured by Adenoid Hynkel's Nazi-forces, Nemo and Jack go to Berlin on a rescue mission only to find out they have been lured into a trap. They are soon pursued by the remains of the Twilight Heroes, Maria and Dr. Caligari. Dr. Mabuse later helps the pair evade capture and reveals to them the plot had been orchestrated by Ayesha, who has become an ally of Hynkel, to get her vengeance after the events of "Heart of Ice". Dr. Mabuse tells Nemo and Jack that Hira was pronounced lost at sea and Armand Robur is currently being held by Hynkel. Nemo and Jack raid Gestapo H.Q. and free Armand but Jack has to sacrifice himself so that Nemo and Armand can escape. Nemo kills Dr. Caligari which causes his soldiers to destroy Maria. Nemo kills Ayesha in a sword fight. The Robur-aircraft arrives and picks up Armand and Janni. Hira, revealed to have survived the downing of The Terror, uses Robur's aircraft to level Berlin.

=== Nemo: River of Ghosts ===
This book takes place in the year of 1975 and is set in South America. The publisher description states: "It's 1975. Janni Dakkar, pirate queen of Lincoln Island and head of the fabled Nemo family, is eighty years old and beginning to display a tenuous grasp on reality. Pursuing shadows from her past—or her imagination—she embarks on what may be a final voyage down the vastness of the Amazon, a last attempt to put to rest the blood-drenched spectres of old. With allies and adversaries old and new, we accompany an ageing predator on her obsessive trek into the cultural landscape of a strange new continent, from the ruined city of Yu-Atlanchi to the fabulous plateau of Maple White Land. As the dark threads in her narrative are drawn into an inescapable web, Captain Nemo leads her hearse-black Nautilus in a desperate raid on horrors believed dead for decades".

== Text stories ==
=== A Perfect Match.. And A Perfect Fuse! ===
Written by Hildy Johnson, this short story appears at the end of Heart of Ice. It is presented as a magazine article and is set in 1938 on Lincoln Island, focusing on the marriage of Hira Dakkar and Armand Robur.

=== The Johnson Report: Princess Dakkar of Lincoln ===
Writren by Hildy Johnson, this short story appears at the end of The Roses of Berlin. It is presented as a magazine article and is set in 1965 on Lincoln Island. The story is an interview with Janni Dakkar on the former pirate's seventieth birthday.
