= Hugo Hercules =

American comic strip (1902–1903)

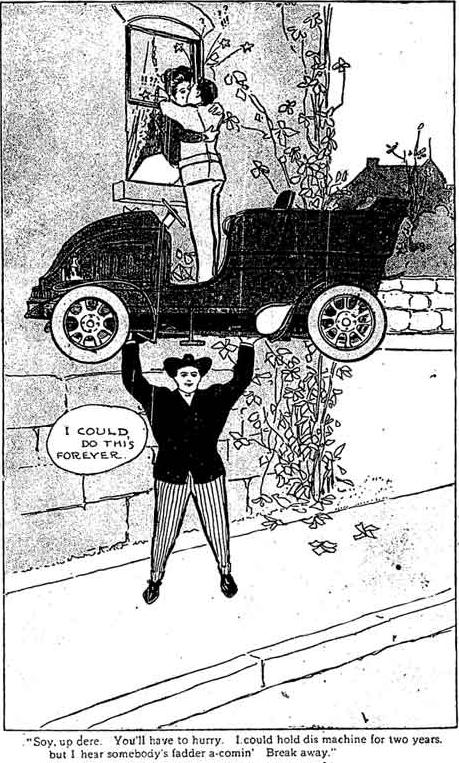
Hugo lifting a car.

Hugo Hercules was an American weekly comic strip published in the Chicago Tribune, written and drawn by Wilhelm Heinrich Detlev Körner. It ran for five months, from September 7, 1902, to January 11, 1903, totaling seventeen strips. Despite its short run, it is considered the earliest superhero fiction comic.

== Characters and story ==
A good-natured man endowed with superhuman strength, Hugo was often depicted wandering about town, assisting people with their dilemmas and shocking them with displays of power. He was "strong enough to pick up an elephant", "kick a house like a football", "wield an artillery cannon like a handgun", and lift a locomotive engine off the tracks and pull its cargo behind him at train speeds. Casual about his incredible feats, Hugo often repeated his catchphrase, "just as easy", shrugging off the crowds.

Sometimes referred to as the first superhero, the strip was not a great success and Körner eventually left comics to become a painter.

== Strips ==
- Sept 7, 1902: Hugo Hercules Obliges Beauty in Distress.
- Sept 14: Hugo Hercules Stops the Terrible Runaway.
- Sept 21: Hugo Hercules to the Rescue Once More.
- Sept 28: (no strip)
- Oct 5: Hugo Hercules Rescues Lady Disdain Once More.
- Oct 12: Hugo Hercules Performs Another Prodigy.
- Oct 19: (no strip)
- Oct 26: Now, Wasn't This Kind of Hugo Hercules?
- Nov 2: Hugo Hercules Saves Four Comic Supplement Lives.
- Nov 9: Hugo Hercules Has a Great Pull with the Conductor.
- Nov 16: Hugo Hercules Misses the Football, But --"
- Nov 23: It's Just as Easy for Hercules to Make a Touchdown.
- Nov 30: Hugo Hercules Gets Along Quite Well Without a Cab.
- Dec 7: Hugo Hercules Does a Little Holding Up Himself.
- Dec 14: Hugo Hercules Comes to the Rescue of the Cannon Ball Limited.
- Dec 21: The Fire Engine Broke Down - But Hercules Was There.
- Dec 28: Hugo Hercules at New Year's Bowling Contest.
- Jan 4, 1903: Hugo Hercules Goes Ice Boating.
- Jan 11, 1903: Hugo Hercules Wrestles with a Bear.

== Other appearances ==
Hugo Hercules appears in the graphic novel Nemo: River of Ghosts and the subsequent, limited series The League of Extraordinary Gentlemen, Volume IV: The Tempest, both written by Alan Moore and illustrated by Kevin O'Neill.
