= The League of Extraordinary Gentlemen: Black Dossier =

Graphic novel by Alan Moore and Kevin O'Neill

- Cover of Black Dossier

Publication information
- Publisher: WildStorm/DC Comics
- Genre: Alternate history Horror; Spy; Steampunk; Superhero
- Publication date: November 14, 2007
- Main character(s): Mina Murray; Allan Quatermain; Orlando; Jimmy; Emma Night; Hugo Drummond; Prospero; Fanny Hill; Galley-Wag; Harry Lime/M; Billy Bunter

Creative team
- Written by: Alan Moore
- Artist: Kevin O'Neill
- Letterer: Bill Oakley

The League of Extraordinary Gentlemen: Black Dossier is an original graphic novel in the comic book series The League of Extraordinary Gentlemen, written by Alan Moore and illustrated by Kevin O'Neill. It was the last volume of the series to be published by DC Comics. Although the third book to be published, it was not intended to be the third volume in the series. Moore has stated that it was intended to be "a sort of ingenious sourcebook", and not a regular volume.

Black Dossier was released on November 14, 2007.

== Background and format ==
Originally referred to as The Dark Dossier during early announcements of its existence, The League of Extraordinary Gentlemen: Black Dossier differs from the other regular volumes, as it is a self-contained graphic novel designed to be a "sourcebook" for the series. While the first two volumes included prose stories as backup features, the majority of Black Dossier consists of non-comic pieces, taking the form of prose stories, letters, maps, guidebooks, magazines and even a lost Shakespeare folio. Also included is a 'Tijuana bible' insert that adapts George Orwell's novel Nineteen Eighty-Four and a 3-D section complete with custom glasses, but these prose pieces and inserts are framed by a comic story, in which Mina Harker and Allan Quatermain obtain the Black Dossier itself and are then pursued by government forces.

All illustrations are done by Kevin O'Neill, the artist on the first two volumes. Alan Moore also recorded a vinyl record of him singing an original song that would be released with the book, but DC did not include it.

After many changed shipping dates, the Absolute Edition was released with no vinyl record, no script/sketch companion book (something that had shipped with Absolute "League" volumes 1 & 2), and a price point of $99, $24 higher than the two previous Absolute League volumes.

Bill Oakley died halfway through designing the book, so the last half was designed by Todd Klein. The book is dedicated to Oakley's memory.

The vinyl record was eventually produced in the UK.

== Development ==
According to Moore the Black Dossier was created because Moore was uncomfortable with the idea of O'Neill being unemployed during the planned hiatus between Volumes II and III of The League of Extraordinary Gentlemen. Wanting to do a source book for The League of Extraordinary Gentlemen, Moore began writing the Black Dossier, expanding the original idea to include numerous different prose sections of different styles from a Fanny Hill "sequel" to a beatnik style story and a comic narrative that frames the Dossier sections.

Moore and O'Neill also took the main characters Mina Murray and Allan 60 years into the future out of fear that the Victorian era was already waning in interest. Because many of the characters used in the Black Dossier are not in the public domain, Moore became more creative in alluding to the characters' identities but never directly revealing who they were, thus avoiding legal issues with the owners of those characters. For example, the character of "Jimmy" is a thinly veiled reference to James Bond; hints to this include owning Campion Bond's cigarette case and lighter, his preference for Vodka Martinis, having a scar from the novels, as well as owning a James Bond trademark Walther PPK pistol with 007 engraved on it. The names of other characters are shortened or otherwise changed to mask their origins: Mrs. Peel from the Avengers uses her maiden name throughout the graphic novel (here spelled "Night" instead of "Knight"), and Billy Bunter is only referred to by his first name.

A DC press release stated at the time that it would not be released outside the United States "due to international copyright concerns and related issues". This was not a problem with the previous volumes, as the Victorian setting meant that most of the characters used were from works that are no longer in copyright, but the book is available in the United Kingdom and Canada.

== Plot ==
Unlike earlier volumes, the comic book portions of Black Dossier are not set in the Victorian era; rather, they are set in 1958, after the fall of the Big Brother government from Nineteen Eighty-Four (the explanation for this discrepancy is that Orwell's book was originally set in 1948, but the dates were changed by the publisher). The frame story sees Mina Harker and Allan Quatermain—now immortal after bathing in the fire of youth from She: A History of Adventure—on their quest to recover the Black Dossier, which contains the secret history of the now-disbanded League of Extraordinary Gentlemen.

The book starts with Mina Murray (going by the name Odette O'quim) at a bar in London, where MI5 agent James "Jimmy" Bond (grandson of Campion Bond) attempts to seduce her, taking her to the decaying remains of the "Ministry of Love", once one of Big Brother's government departments. Jimmy attempts to rape Mina but is subdued by a brick hidden in Mina's handbag. Allan quickly arrives and the two retrieve the Dossier. Harry Lime, the new M, teams Jimmy up with Emma Night and her uncle, an aged Hugo Drummond, to hunt down Mina and Allan, who are believed to be heading North.

Mina and Allan take a detour to Greyfriars School in Kent which houses the thirty-nine steps and was attended by Harold Wharton, a.k.a. Big Brother. The caretaker, William, reveals that many British spies were groomed at the school and that Bob Cherry is Harry Lime. Mina and Allan agree to visit a spaceport on their detour (space-travel technology has flourished since the Martian invasion of Volume II). At the spaceport, Jimmy, Emma and Hugo find Allan and Mina, who escape via a robot-piloted rocket that references British children's show Fireball XL5.

The two escape the crashing rocket by parachute and land in the Scottish countryside to find a ruined castle they were heading for. Galley-Wag rescues them from Jimmy and escorts them into the castle. Hugo follows them inside, where Mina reveals that they are the same Mina Murray and Allan Quatermain who fought off Professor Moriarty and the Martians. They also reveal that Jimmy's career is mostly fabricated, that he is a double agent for the United States and that he killed John Night, Emma's father and Hugo's brother. Hugo lets them leave and tries to kill Jimmy for his actions, but he is shot by Bond at point-blank range.

Mina and Allan successfully return to the mysterious, utopian universe of The Blazing World, where they are reunited with their mutual lover Orlando and have safely hidden the dossier.

=== The Black Dossier ===
As Murray and Quatermain read the dossier, the contents of the dossier interrupt the narrative in different sections. Stories include:

- "On the Descent of the Gods", an account of the gods of the League universe, as written by Oliver Haddo.
- A twenty-five page Life of Orlando comic strip which tells the entire life of Orlando, from his birth in the city of Thebes in 1260 B.C. up to the Second World War, told in the style the 1950s British comic Trump.
- A faux William Shakespeare play detailing the foundation of the League by Prospero from The Tempest.
- An imaginary sequel to John Cleland's Fanny Hill, with full-page illustrations akin to those that Marquis Von Bayros illustrated for the book.
- A Bertie Wooster and Jeeves prose story involving one of Great Old Ones from the stories of H. P. Lovecraft.
- "The Crazy Wide Forever", a short story written in the style of Jack Kerouac.

Other features include:

- A picture map of the Blazing World and its location.
- A cut-away of Nemo's Nautilus Mark II submarine.
- A series of postcards Mina and Allan sent between the years 1899 and 1913.
- Profiles of the second twentieth century Leagues and the group's French and German counterparts.

== Reception ==
Time magazine's Lev Grossman named it one of the "Top 10 Graphic Novels of 2007", ranking it at #2 and praising it as "effing genius". Jesse Schedeen of IGN gave Black Dossier a 9.5 rating, praising the complex detail of Kevin O'Neill's artwork and the literary quality of Moore's writing, whilst criticizing the quality of the paper, the printing style of the hardcover version and some aspects of the storytelling.

== Awards ==
- 2007: Won the "Favourite Original Graphic Novel" Eagle Award
