= Nigel Molesworth =

Fictional character

Front cover art for The Compleet Molesworth

Nigel Molesworth is a fictional character, the supposed author of a series of books about life in an English prep school named St Custard's. The books were written by Geoffrey Willans, with cartoon illustrations by Ronald Searle.

The Molesworth books were the result of an approach by Willans to the cartoonist, Searle, to illustrate a series of books based on a column he had been writing for Punch from 1939. They appeared in installments from January 1955 to December 1958 in the children's magazine Young Elizabethan, described by Molesworth as "the super smashing New Young Elizabethan ahem (advert.)". Searle had grown disillusioned with his highly popular St Trinian's School series but had promised his publisher Max Parrish another Christmas best-seller. While Searle was initially sceptical about another school-based project, he was won over by the examples he was given to read by Willans. Between the initial publication in 1953 and Willans' death in 1958 at the age of 47 three books were completed and most of a fourth (Back in the Jug Agane) written; the Compleet Molesworth anthology was also under way. The first book, Down with Skool!, was published in October 1953 and by that Christmas had sold, according to Searle, 53,848 copies, surpassing the performance of the previous year's The Terror of St Trinian's.

According to Searle in his obituary of Willans in The Times: "His cunning was more refined than Bunter ... Willans was delighted that schoolmasters, far from feeling publicly disrobed, were in fact giving away his books as end of school prizes."

== St Custard's ==
Nigel Molesworth is a schoolboy at St Custard's, a fictional (and dysfunctional) prep school located in a carefully unspecified part of England. It is ruled with an iron fist by Headmaster "GRIMES" (BA, Stoke-on-Trent), who is constantly in search of cash to supplement his income and has a part-time business running a whelk stall. Other masters include Sigismund Arbuthnot, the "mad maths master", who frequently appears as Molesworth's nemesis in his daydreams.

St Custard's, according to Molesworth, "was built by a madman in 1836". The school's traditional local rivals are Porridge Court, who regularly beat St Custard's convincingly in all sporting events.

Molesworth's spelling is consistently poor throughout all the books, as many words are rendered phonetically, including the names of those Molesworth knows. Grimes' name is one of the very few he spells correctly, but he always writes it in all capital letters to signify his fear of him. Regardless, many fans find this feature endearing. The phrase "as any fule kno", appended to many of Nigel's pronouncements, has achieved fame beyond its author and can sometimes be seen in the mainstream British press (usually in a satirical context; the phrase often appears in Private Eye). It was used by J. K. Rowling to end an essay she wrote for Pegasus, the journal of the University of Exeter Department of Classics and Ancient History, reminiscing on her studies there. In fact, Rowling mentions in the essay that she had read the books. (Notably, there is mention of a 'Latin pla' which Molesworth has to read: 'the Hogwarts'. The name also crops up for the headmaster of Porridge Court, who is named 'Hoggwart' in the book.) The phrase 'as any fule kno' was also used as the title of a Deep Purple song, "Any Fule Kno That".

The books in the series are, in order of original publication:

- Down with Skool! A Guide to School Life for Tiny Pupils and their Parents (1953)
- How to be Topp: A Guide to Sukcess for Tiny Pupils, Including All There is to Kno about Space (1954)
- Whizz for Atomms: A Guide to Survival in the 20th Century for Fellow Pupils, their Doting Maters, Pompous Paters and Any Others who are Interested (1956)
  - Published in the US as Molesworth's Guide to the Atommic Age
- Back in the Jug Agane (1959)
- The Compleet Molesworth (1958)
- Molesworth (2000 Penguin reprint), ISBN 0-14-118600-3

They are part of a British tradition of children's books set at boarding schools (school stories), which includes the Billy Bunter stories, the Jennings novels and most recently the Harry Potter books. Unlike these others, however, the Molesworth books do not consist of linear storylines but rather feature Molesworth's wisdom on a variety of topics as well as his fanciful daydreams. The topics covered extend from boarding-school life to reflections on the culture of 1950s Britain. Television (then still relatively novel to British households), the start of space travel and the atomic age, the Davy Crockett craze and "How to be a young Elizabethan" all feature, as well as more timeless topics such as Christmas, the French, journalism (with "N. Molesworth, Ace Reporter") and "Gurls".

== Major characters ==
Some of the pupils at St Custard's:

- Nigel Molesworth, the self-styled "curse of st custards" and "goriller of 3b".
- Molesworth 2, his younger brother. Described by Nigel thus "uterly wet and a weed it panes me to think i am of the same blud". He is called George by a "gurl" in the final book.
- Peason, Molesworth's "grate frend". Molesworth and Peason build numerous inventions together. Considering Molesworth's phonetic spelling, it is possible that Peason's name is actually Pearson.
- Gillibrand, another of Molesworth's classmates. It is regularly mentioned in passing that his father is a General.
- Grabber. Head boy of the School, "captane of everything" (especially "foopball") and "winer of the mrs joyful prize for rafia work". His parents are extremely rich and Molesworth cynically opines that Grabber "could win a brownies knitting badge for the ushual amount".
- Basil Fotherington-Tomas. A goody-goody, a wet and a weed. He has curly blond locks and is prone to skip around the school girlishly saying "Hullo clouds, hullo sky". "Aktually it is only fotherington-tomas he sa Hullo clouds hullo sky he is a girlie and love the scents and sounds of nature tho the less i smell and hear them the better."

Some of the staff at St Custard's:

- Headmaster GRIMES. Headmasters "are always very ferce and keep thousands of KANES chiz moan drone". Molesworth always writes his name in all capital letters to signify how seriously he takes him.
- Sigismund Arbuthnot, the mad maths master.
- The Matron.

Many of the staff are not named.

== Continuation works and legacy ==
Simon Brett wrote two sequels to the series in which a grown-up Nigel offered his observations on subjects such as jobs, family, holidays and DIY: Molesworth Rites Again (1983) and How To Stay Topp (1987).

In 1987 the character was reprised for a four-part BBC Radio 4 series, Molesworth. Written by Brett, the series portrayed Molesworth in middle age, still surrounded by many of the characters from his youth. Molesworth was played by Willie Rushton, with Penelope Nice as his wife Louise, and Clive Swift as the now aged ex-headmaster Grimes.

In 2022 Korero Press published the Molesworth diaries that appeared in Punch magazine between August 1939 and December 1942 in one volume titled The Lost Diaries of Nigel Molesworth. They were illustrated by Uli Meyer in the style of Ronald Searle.

In The League of Extraordinary Gentlemen, Volume III: Century, Basil Fotherington-Tomas cameos in Chapter 2 as a member of the band Purple Orchestra.

The Molesworth Institute is a fictional organisation, started in 1956, with the aim of promoting library humour. It is a combination of real librarians and fictitious people, mostly literary characters.

== See also ==
- 1066 And All That
- Cacography
- Hogwarts
- Radio Malt
