= Eugene Byrne =

English writer (born 1959)

Eugene Byrne (born 25 February 1959) is an English freelance journalist and fiction writer. His novel ThigMOO, and the story it was based on, were nominated for the BSFA award. His story "HMS Habakkuk" was nominated for a Sidewise Award for Alternate History.

He was born in Waterford in the Republic of Ireland, but was brought up in Burnham-on-Sea, Somerset. He attended Dr Morgan's Grammar School, Bridgwater where he met Kim Newman.

Byrne was a contributing editor to Venue magazine. In 2006, as part of Bristol's Isambard Kingdom Brunel bicentennial celebrations, he wrote Isambard Kingdom Brunel: A Graphic Biography with artist Simon Gurr.

== Novels ==
- Back in the USSA (1997), co-written with Kim Newman; fix-up comprising short stories first published in Interzone magazine
- Thigmoo (1999)
- Things Unborn (2001)

== Non-fiction ==
- Isambard Kingdom Brunel: A Graphic Biography, with artist Simon Gurr (2006)
- The Bristol Story: A Graphic and (Mostly) True History of the Greatest City in the World!, with artist Simon Gurr (2008)
- Darwin: A Graphic Biography, with artist Simon Gurr (2009)
