= The Convent School, or Early Experiences of A Young Flagellant =

19th-century work of sado-masochistic pornography

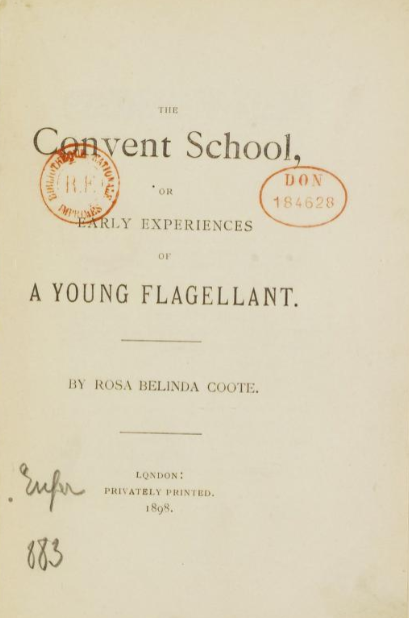
- Title page for The Convent School, or Early Experiences of A Young Flagellant (1898 edition)
- Author: "Rosa Coote"
- Language: English
- Genre: Erotic fiction
- Publisher: William Dugdale
- Publication date: 1876
- Publication place: London, United Kingdom

The Convent School, or Early Experiences of A Young Flagellant is a 19th-century work of sado-masochistic pornography, written under the pseudonym Rosa Coote and published by William Dugdale in London in 1876. Henry Spencer Ashbee catalogues it with the comment that "the numerous flagellations, supplemented by filthy tortures, are insuperably tedious and revolting". The principal character and ostensible author Rosa Coote also appears in a series of related stories in The Pearl magazine.
