= Slow Chocolate Autopsy =

1997 novel by Iain Sinclair

Slow Chocolate Autopsy: Incidents from the Notorious Career of Norton, Prisoner of London
- Cover of Slow Chocolate Autopsy
- Author: Iain Sinclair; Dave McKean (illustration)
- Language: English
- Publisher: Phoenix House

Slow Chocolate Autopsy: Incidents from the Notorious Career of Norton, Prisoner of London is a 1997 novel by Iain Sinclair and illustrated by Dave McKean. It concerns Norton who is trapped in space, within London's city limits, but not in time.

== Plot summary ==
The book is in twelve parts, each one featuring Norton (nine of which are in the form of stories and three as a mixture of illustrations and photo-strips). His adventures include participating in the death of Christopher Marlowe, the Ripper murders, as well as more recent events that have shaped London.

== Genre ==
The book can be considered an example of psychogeography, which explores the specific effects of the geographical environment on the emotions and behavior of individuals.

== In other media ==
=== Comics ===
Iain Sinclair's friend Alan Moore has included the character of Andrew Norton, the Prisoner of London, in The League of Extraordinary Gentlemen, Volume III: Century. The character's physical appearance here is based on that of Sinclair himself.
