= Geoffrey Willans =

English writer

Herbert Geoffrey Willans (4 February 1911 – 6 August 1958), an English writer and journalist, is best known as the creator of Nigel Molesworth, the "goriller of 3B" and "curse of St. Custard's", as in the four books with illustrations by Ronald Searle.

Willans was born in Smyrna (now İzmir) in Turkey, where his father was a superintendent of the Ottoman Aidan Railway.

He was educated at Blundells School in Tiverton, Devon, and became a schoolmaster there. He also taught at Sutherland House, Surrey and Carn Brea School, Bromley. He enjoyed sailing in small boats. During the Second World War he served with the RNVR; he took part in the Greek campaign and the Battle of Crete in the Eastern Mediterranean, serving on the corvette HMS Peony. He later joined the carrier HMS Formidable.

Molesworth first appeared in Punch in 1939, and later became the protagonist and narrator of four books: Down with Skool! (1953), How to be Topp (1954), Wizz for Atomms (1956) and, after Willans's death, Back in the Jug Agane (1959). All four were collected in The Compleet Molesworth. Comic misspellings, erratic capitalisation and schoolboy slang are threads running through all the books.

According to Ronald Searle in his obituary of Willans in The Times: "His cunning was more refined than Bunter ... Willans was delighted that schoolmasters, far from feeling publicly disrobed, were in fact giving away his books as end of school prizes."

Willans wrote other books. A review in The Times described his novel The Whistling Arrow (1957) as having a futuristic aeroplane as the 'heroine'; "It is his apparent strength in writing about planes and the people that flew them." The reviewer compared it with one of Evelyn Waugh's earlier novels. The idea of a 'whistling arrow' was popularised by the Walt Disney Studio film The Story of Robin Hood and His Merrie Men (1952), starring Richard Todd, where arrows that whistled were used as signals between Robin Hood and his outlaw band.

Willans also co-wrote the screenplay for the film The Bridal Path (1959), which starred George Cole, but he died of a heart attack in London at the age of 47 before the film was released. He also wrote a number of other, mostly humorous, books, including The Dog's Ear Book (also with Searle), My Uncle Harry (an exploration of the British gentlemen's club), Fasten Your Lapstraps! (an account of the early days of intercontinental flight) and Admiral on Horseback (a more serious one about the Royal Navy).

== Bibliography ==
=== Molesworth ===
- Down with Skool! A Guide to School Life for Tiny Pupils and their Parents (1953)
- How to be Topp: A Guide to Sukcess for Tiny Pupils, Including All There is to Kno about Space (1954)
- Whizz for Atomms: A Guide to Survival in the 20th Century for Fellow Pupils, their Doting Maters, Pompous Paters and Any Others who are Interested (1956)
  - Published in the U.S. as Molesworth's Guide to the Atomic Age
- Back in the Jug Agane (1959)
- The Compleet Molesworth (1958)
  - Molesworth (2000 Penguin reprint), ISBN 0-14-118600-3
- The Lost Diaries of Nigel Molesworth (2022)

=== Other titles ===
- Shallow Dive (1934)
- Romantic Manner (1936)
- One Eye on the Clock (1943)
- Admiral on Horseback (1954)
- The Wit of Winston Churchill (1954), with Charles Roetter
- Fasten Your Lapstraps! A Guide for All Those who Wing the World in Super-comfort and Super-luxury in Super-aeroplanes (1955)
- Crisis Cottage (1956)
- My Uncle Harry (1957)
- The Whistling Arrow (1957)
- Peter Ustinov (1957)
- The Dog's Ear Book (1958)
