= Rosa Coote =

Fictional dominatrix

Rosa Coote is a fictional dominatrix appearing as a stock character in a number of works of Victorian erotica, including The Convent School, or Early Experiences of A Young Flagellant (as the notional author) by William Dugdale and "Letters to a Lady Friend" or "Miss Coote's Confession" in The Pearl. Henry Spencer Ashbee writes of The Convent School that "The book is not altogether badly written; no part of the narrative however is attractive".

The surname "Coote" is taken from the historical General Sir Eyre Coote, who was disgraced in a flogging scandal in 1815: in "Miss Coote's Confession" the general is stated to be Rosa Coote's grandfather. The character is probably based on the real-life Theresa Berkley who ran a brothel in Soho in the 1830s.

The character reappears in The League of Extraordinary Gentlemen by Alan Moore and Kevin O'Neill. She is Headmistress of the Correctional Academy for Wayward Gentlewomen, where the League discover Hawley Griffin, the Invisible Man, impregnating her students (who believe he is the Holy Spirit), including Rebecca Randall (from Rebecca of Sunnybrook Farm) and Pollyanna Whittier (from Pollyanna and Pollyanna Grows Up).
