= Broad Arrow Jack =

Broad Arrow Jack is a penny dreadful written by E. Harcourt Burrage in 1866.

== Plot summary ==
Broad Arrow Jack follows the story of John Ashleigh, nicknamed Broad Arrow Jack on account of an arrow brand on his back. The story begins with Jack falling on hard times in colonial Australia, becoming a notorious outlaw and eventually in England married to a wealthy aristocrat.

== In popular culture ==
- In The League of Extraordinary Gentlemen by Alan Moore and Kevin O'Neill, Broad Arrow Jack appears as a crew member on Captain Nemo's The Nautilus.
