= The Magician (Maugham novel) =

1908 novel by William Somerset Maugham

- First US edition
- Author: W. Somerset Maugham
- Language: English
- Genre: Fantasy novel
- Publisher: Heinemann (UK); Duffield and Company (US)
- Publication date: 1908 (UK), 1909 (US)
- Publication place: United Kingdom
- Media type: Print (hardcover)
- Pages: 224

The Magician is a novel by British author W. Somerset Maugham, originally published in 1908. In this tale, the magician Oliver Haddo, a caricature of Aleister Crowley, attempts to create life. Crowley wrote a critique of this book under the pen name Oliver Haddo, in which he accused Maugham of plagiarism.

Maugham wrote The Magician in London, after he had spent some time living in Paris, where he met Aleister Crowley. The novel was later republished with a foreword by Maugham entitled “A Fragment of Autobiography”.

The novel inspired a film of the same name directed in 1926 by Rex Ingram.

== Plot summary ==
Arthur Burdon, a renowned English surgeon, is visiting Paris to see his fiancée, Margaret Dauncey. Margaret is studying art in a Parisian school, along with her friend Susie Boyd. On his first evening in Paris, Burdon meets Oliver Haddo, who claims to be a magician and is an acquaintance of Burdon's mentor, the retired doctor and occult scholar Dr. Porhoët. While none of the company initially believe Haddo's claims, Haddo performs several feats of magic for them over the following days. Arthur eventually fights with Haddo, after the magician kicks Margaret's dog.

In revenge, Haddo uses both his personality and his magic to seduce Margaret, despite her initial revulsion towards him. They get married and run away from Paris, leaving merely a note to inform Arthur, Susie and Porhoët. Arthur is distraught at the abandonment and promptly returns to England to immerse himself in his work. By this time Susie has fallen in love with Arthur, although she realises that this love will never be returned, and she goes away to Italy with a friend.

During her travels, Susie hears much about the new Mr. and Mrs. Haddo, including a rumour that their marriage has not been consummated. When she eventually returns to England, she reunites with Arthur and they go to a dinner party held by a mutual acquaintance. To their horror, the Haddos are at this dinner party, and Oliver takes great delight in gloating at Arthur's distress.

The next day, Arthur goes to the hotel at which Margaret is staying, and whisks her away to a house in the country. Although she files for divorce from Haddo, his influence on her proves too strong, and she ends up returning to him. Feeling that this influence must be supernatural, Susie returns to France to consult with Dr Porhoët on a possible solution.

Several weeks later, Arthur joins them in Paris and reveals that he visited Margaret at Haddo's home and that she suggested her life was threatened by her new husband. She implies that Haddo is only waiting for the right time to perform a magical ritual, which will involve the sacrifice of her life. Arthur travels to Paris to ask for Porhoët's advice. A week later, Arthur has an overwhelming feeling that Margaret's life is in danger, and all three rush back to England.

When they arrive at Skene, Haddo's ancestral home in the village of Venning, they are told by the local innkeeper that Margaret has died of a heart attack. Believing that Haddo has murdered her, Arthur confronts first the local doctor and then Haddo himself with his suspicions. Searching for proof of foul play, Arthur persuades Porhoët to raise Margaret's ghost from the dead, which proves to them that she was murdered. Eventually, Haddo uses his magic to appear in their room at the local inn, where Arthur kills him. However, when the light is turned on Haddo's body has disappeared.

The trio visit Haddo's abandoned home to find that he has used his magic to create life – hideous creatures living in tubes – and that this is the purpose for which he sacrificed Margaret's life. After finding the magician's dead body in his attic, Arthur sets fire to the manor to destroy all evidence of Haddo's occult experiments.

== Maugham's comments ==
In 1956, nearly fifty years after the publication of The Magician, Maugham commented on the book in "A Fragment of Autobiography". He writes that by then he had almost completely forgotten the book, and, on rereading it, found the writing "lush and turgid", using more adverbs and adjectives than he would at that later date, and notes that he must have been trying to emulate the "écriture artiste" (artistic writing) of the French writers of the time. The plot bears some resemblance to George du Maurier's 1894 novel Trilby. Maugham also comments that he must have spent days and days reading in the library of the British Museum in order to come by all the material on the black arts.

== Crowley's allegations of plagiarism ==
In the magazine Vanity Fair, Aleister Crowley wrote, under the pen name Oliver Haddo, "How to Write a Novel! (After W. S. Maugham)", a review of The Magician in which he accused Maugham of having plagiarised the following books in writing the novel:

- The Island of Dr Moreau by H. G. Wells
- Kabbalah Unveiled by Christian Knorr von Rosenroth, translated by Samuel Liddell MacGregor Mathers
- The Life of Paracelsus by Franz Hartmann.
- Dogme et Rituel de la Haute Magie by Éliphas Lévi, translated by A. E. Waite
- The Blossom and the Fruit, by Mabel Collins

Most critics consider that the above works were merely sources for an original story, and that Crowley's accusation was motivated by malice. The large body of original work turned out by Maugham before and after 1908 tends to support this. In "A Fragment of Autobiography" Maugham writes he had not read Crowley's review, adding, "I daresay it was a pretty piece of vituperation, but probably, like his poems, intolerably verbose."
