= Captain Nemo: The Fantastic History of a Dark Genius =

2002 novel by Kevin J. Anderson

- Author: Kevin J. Anderson
- Language: English
- Genre: Steampunk, adventure, crossover, secret history
- Publisher: Pocket Books
- Publication date: January 2, 2002
- Publication place: United States
- Media type: Hardcover
- Pages: 368
- ISBN: 0-7434-4406-X
- OCLC: 48672157
- Dewey Decimal: 813.54

Captain Nemo: The Fantastic History of a Dark Genius is a novel by Kevin J. Anderson, published in 2002 by Pocket Books. It is a secret history and crossover work, the central premise being that many of the things Jules Verne wrote about existed in real life as told to him by the real Captain Nemo.

In 2015, Anderson wrote a short story sequel, "20,000 Years Under the Sea," which incorporates elements from H. P. Lovecraft's "The Call of Cthulhu" and At the Mountains of Madness.

== Plot ==
The novel follows Verne and André Nemo from their childhoods. Verne is depicted as being a sheltered, almost neurotic individual who is incapable of taking risks, while Nemo is adventurous and resourceful, especially after the death of his father (a dock worker). Both lust after the independent-minded Caroline Arronax.

The two boys attempt to apprentice themselves to a ship captain named Grant, but Verne's stern father finds him and forces him to come home and study to become an attorney. However, Nemo joins the crew, and after an attack by pirates, is stranded on a mysterious island. Meanwhile, Caroline is forced to marry an explorer, Captain Hatteras. Eventually Nemo manages to escape through a fantastic underground world. Returning as a hero, Nemo proposes to spend five weeks in a new balloon design exploring Africa. Caroline joins him, but Verne, fearing what might happen, refuses.

Nemo volunteers to fight in the Crimean War. While there, he is taken captive by one of his supposed allies, an Ottoman commander named Robur. Robur is engaged in a power-struggle with a rival official, Barbicane. Nemo is forced to design a submarine for use in the Ottoman navy; after many difficulties, it is finally launched, and christened the Nautilus. Nemo and his fellow slaves use it to kill Robur, but not before their families — including the Turkish wife Nemo had taken and their son — have been killed. Grief-stricken, he turns to piracy, destroying the warships of the world he encounters.

Meanwhile, back in France, the Franco-Prussian War has begun, and Caroline's husband Hatteras has long been missing. However, she rebukes Verne's romantic advances, as by now she only loves Nemo. For Nemo, however, the destructive lashing out begins to lose its appeal, and after sinking a passenger ship, he rescues one of its occupants — a man named Phileas Fogg, who is more concerned with winning a bet of his than the fantastic Nautilus. Nemo decides to bring him to his destination, and then returns home to France.

There, he retrieves Caroline from the Siege of Paris by bringing the Nautilus up the Seine; he takes her to beneath the Arctic ice pack to see the wreckage of her husband's ship. Now free to be together, they return to find Verne, who finally works up the courage to join his friends on their last journey together before Nemo and Caroline retreat beneath the waves together: Nemo brings the Nautilus to Atlantis.

In addition to the fictional characters and members of Verne's family, several other historical individuals appear or play a significant background role, specifically: Victor Hugo, Alexandre Dumas, Georges-Eugène Haussmann, Napoleon III, Said bin Sultan, the Earl of Cardigan, Florence Nightingale, and Pierre-Jules Hetzel.

== Connections to other works ==
The personality and life attributed to Captain Nemo in this book are completely different from those of the character of the same name in Jules Verne's original works, where he is depicted as an Indian Raja embittered by the British crushing of the Indian Rebellion of 1857. Also other characters named after those in various Verne books are given very different characters and careers than those in the original.

Anderson may have decided to give Nemo the first name of Andre from the 1929 film version of The Mysterious Island in which Lionel Barrymore played André Dakkar.

The prison island where Nemo and his fellow captives are held by Robur is called Rura Penthe; this is a reference to the slave factory island from the 1954 film 20,000 Leagues Under the Sea.

It was due to having written Captain Nemo that Pocket Books approached Anderson to write the novelization of 2003 film The League of Extraordinary Gentlemen.

Anderson would later go on to write a similarly themed novel covering H. G. Wells and his works, entitled The Martian War. Verne is mentioned several times in the book.

== Historical errors ==
Some factual errors enter the novel on occasion.

In a scene set in the early 1840s, a ship is said to bear the colors of the French Republic. At this time, France was ruled by the July Monarchy.

A list of young Verne's favorite adventure novels includes Walter D. Edmonds' Drums Along the Mohawk, which postdates Verne's lifetime.

There are several references to Ankara as the capital of the Ottoman Empire. In fact, Constantinople was the capital. Ankara became the capital of the Republic of Turkey in the 1920s.

== See also ==
- Journey to the Center of the Earth (2008) and Journey 2: The Mysterious Island (2012), a motion picture franchise based on a similar "Vernian" secret history premise.
