= Mars: The Home Front =

- Short story by George Alec Effinger
- Country: United States
- Language: English
- Genre: Science fiction

Publication
- Published in: War of the Worlds: Global Dispatches
- Publication type: Book
- Publisher: Bantam Spectra
- Media type: Print (Anthology)
- Publication date: June, 1996

"Mars: The Home Front" is a short story by American writer George Alec Effinger, published in the 1996 anthology War of the Worlds: Global Dispatches. It is a crossover between H. G. Wells' 1898 novel The War of the Worlds and Edgar Rice Burroughs' Barsoom series.

== Plot summary ==
The story is narrated first-person, in the style of Burroughs' writing, by an unnamed man who has just returned to his Virginia cabin after fishing, when he is confronted by Woola, the Barsoomian calot (a bulldog-like predator) of John Carter, Warlord of Mars, who has appeared to relate his latest adventure to his nephew. The narration then assumes Carter's voice as he tells his story (from references he makes, it is set after The Warlord of Mars and before The Chessmen of Mars: he is already Warlord of Barsoom, but his only child is Carthoris). Carter is at a party in Lesser Helium, speaking with Kantos Kan and Mors Kajak when he realizes that Dejah Thoris has gone missing. With Kantos Kan, he finds evidence that she has been kidnapped in a scuffle. Assuming that the kidnappers arrived in two fliers but only escaped in one, Kantos Kan and John Carter enter the other and, finding the coordinates already set, give pursuit.

For half a (Martian) day they fly over an unrecognized portion of Barsoom, finally coming to rest above a complex built around a massive pit. There, they are captured by a band of Red Martians and placed in a cell where a Gathol army officer named Bas-ok, is already held. Bas-ok explains that they are held captive by the sarmaks (a leathery-skinned, tentacled race) who have taken them captive in order to drink their blood. The cell is shaken by a massive explosion, which Bas-ok describes as that of the giant cannon in the center of the complex, launching cylindrical spacecraft against Jasoom. Overpowering the guards, Carter and his companions escape, with him sending Kantos Kan to rally the forces of Helium and with himself and Bas-ok searching for Dejah Thoris.

The narration again assumes Carter's nephew, who explains that he must wait to tell the rest of the story, but gives a brief overview in which Bas-ok betrayed Carter to the sarmaks and was killed for it; and John Carter, after a battle in the sarmaks' feeding chamber, rescued Dejah Thoris and destroyed the cylinder-launching cannon after the tenth blast (explaining why only ten cylinders landed on Earth in The War of the Worlds), and finally led "the navy of Helium...the combined forces of the green men of Thark and Warhoon, the black First Born, and red men from many cities and nations" against the sarmaks. The narration concludes with assurance of Carter's victory.

== Significance ==
"Mars: The Home Front" is one of the few sources to give a name to the Martians of The War of the Worlds (the 1988 TV show called them the Mor-Taxans).

The character of Bas-ok draws comparisons between the sarmaks and the kaldanes, another Martian race of Barsoom; in the Wold Newton Universe, the kaldanes are mutated sarmaks, with both possibly descended from Cthulhuoids.

A number of comparisons have also been drawn to Alan Moore's The League of Extraordinary Gentlemen comic series. The first issue of the second volume had Carter, along with Gullivar Jones, leading an alliance of Martians (including those from Barsoom) in the final assault against the launching cannon of Wells' Martians. In it, a conversation between Carter and Jones indicates that something has happened to Dejah Thoris during the war; Jess Nevins' semi-official annotations for the series suggest that Moore was referencing her abduction in "The Home Front". Others have noted that "It's tempting, my god but it's tempting, to try and read Effinger's short story and Alan Moore's comic together. Effinger's is the beginning, and Moore gives us the end, leaving only a detailed middle for us to imagine".

The concept of the Martians of Wells and Burroughs coexisting (and fighting) on the same fictional Mars was also used in Larry Niven's 1999 novella "Rainbow Mars" and briefly indicated in Ian Edginton's 2006 comic Scarlet Traces: The Great Game.

In 2017, Stephen Baxter published his own sequel to The War of the Worlds, The Massacre of Mankind. Baxter read Global Dispatches before writing his novel; in Baxter's work, the Martian invasion occurred in 1907, and by the 1920s Edgar Rice Burroughs is known for his "sagas of human heroes biffling the Martians on their own home soil".
