= The League of Extraordinary Gentlemen, Volume II =

Limited comic book series

- Cover

Publication information
- Publisher: WildStorm (DC Comics)
- Schedule: Irregular
- Format: Limited series
- Genre: Alternate history Steampunk
- Publication date: September 2002 – November 2003
- No. of issues: 6
- Main character(s): Mina Murray; Allan Quatermain; Hawley Griffin; Dr. Henry Jekyll/Mr. Edward Hyde; Captain Nemo

Creative team
- Written by: Alan Moore
- Artist: Kevin O'Neill
- Letterer: Bill Oakley
- Colorist: Benedict Dimagmaliw
- Editor(s): Scott Dunbier; Kristy Quinn

Collected editions
- Hardcover: ISBN 1-4012-0117-2
- Paperback: ISBN 1-4012-0118-0
- Absolute edition: ISBN 1-4012-0611-5

The League of Extraordinary Gentlemen, Volume II is a comic book limited series written by Alan Moore and illustrated by Kevin O'Neill, published under the America's Best Comics imprint of DC Comics in the United States and under Vertigo in the United Kingdom. It is a sequel to the original volume of The League of Extraordinary Gentlemen and like its previous installment is a pastiche of various characters and events from Victorian literature; though it borrows a great number of characters and elements from various literary works of writers such as Sir Arthur Conan Doyle, Edgar Rice Burroughs, Ian Fleming, Robert Louis Stevenson and Bram Stoker, it is predominantly a retelling of The War of the Worlds by H. G. Wells.

The volume continues the narrative of Mina Murray, Allan Quatermain, Hawley Griffin, Dr. Henry Jekyll/Edward Hyde and Captain Nemo who respond to an invasion of England by extraterrestrial invaders.

== Plot ==
=== Issue #1: Phases of Deimos ===
On the planet Mars, John Carter and Gullivar Jones have assembled an alliance of Martian races to combat an invading race of non-Martian aliens called "Molluscs" (the aliens from H. G. Wells' The War of the Worlds). After a fierce battle, the Martian alliance successfully force the Molluscs to leave Mars, but Carter worries that they might go to Earth.

On Earth, in the year 1898, the League of Extraordinary Gentlemen (consisting of Allan Quatermain, Dr. Henry Jekyll, Mina Murray, Captain Nemo and Hawley Griffin) arrives in Horsell Common, where a Mollusc spaceship lies at the centre of an impact crater.

=== Issue #2: People of Other Lands ===
The League meets with MI5 agent Campion Bond, and debate about what the mysterious craft is and where it came from. A tentacled alien emerges from the craft, and a group of men carrying a white flag descend into the crater to make peace with it, only to be incinerated by a powerful heat-ray from the craft. As the heat-ray kills the onlookers gathered around the crater's edge, Dr. Jekyll turns into Mr. Hyde, who threatens the alien with violent death. Mina manages to calm Hyde down, and the League retreat to the nearby Bleak House Inn.

Later that day, the British armed forces arrive in the area, and Griffin sees another spaceship falling from the sky towards Woking. Mina checks on Hyde, and they have a compassionate conversation about their friendship, which is something Hyde does not feel he shares with the other League members, but he politely asks Mina to leave, believing he will kill her at the slightest provocation. Meanwhile, Griffin returns to the crater on his own and encounters the aliens. Communicating with them by drawing pictures on the ground, he tells them he wishes to be their ally.

=== Issue #3: And the Dawn Comes Up Like Thunder ===
The next morning, the League leaves the inn and hears the military shelling another spaceship that has landed in Surrey. Most of the army division is incinerated by the alien's heat-ray, which also destroys the inn. A coach arrives to take the League back to London, but on the way, Mina starts to fear not every League member will survive this mission. At their headquarters in the British Museum, Mycroft Holmes tasks the League with researching Mars and returning to Horsell to observe the alien's behaviour. Bond gives Mina secret military plans and tells her to study them, as well as find out all she can about Mars. Allan, Hyde and Nemo set off back to Horsell, leaving Mina on her own and unprotected at the headquarters. Griffin stays behind and hides under cover of invisibility, and once Mina is alone he fiercely assaults her, then flees with the military plans.

During their reconnaissance, Allan, Hyde and Nemo encounter a Tripod, an enormous three-legged war machine, and set off back to London to warn British Intelligence. Upon returning to the museum, Hyde finds Mina lying beaten and unconscious on the floor, and realises what has happened. After Mina recovers from her attack, Mycroft sends her and Allan on a new mission: they travel to the South Downs to find a scientist who may be able to help stop the invasion.

=== Issue #4: All Creatures Great and Small ===
While Mina and Allan are away, Captain Nemo and Mr. Hyde patrol the Thames in the Nautilus and fend off the oncoming Tripods. The advanced technology aboard the Nautilus proves to be an even match for the Tripods, and Nemo orders his crew to bring the wreckage of a destroyed Tripod on board so they can study the alien technology.

While investigating the South Downs countryside, Mina and Allan meet a man called Teddy Prendrick (the protagonist of H. G. Wells' The Island of Dr. Moreau). He is insane and gives them little information, but does mention a "devil doctor", whom they suspect could be the scientist they are looking for. Despite Prendrick's warnings, Mina and Allan continue to search the countryside, retiring to a country inn at the end of the day, where they end up having sex. Awakening afterwards, Allan notices horrific scars on Mina's neck (which were left by Count Dracula) and is shocked at the sight. Back in London, Griffin approaches the aliens again and tells them they have to "do something to the river" to stop the Nautilus.

=== Issue #5: Red in Tooth and Claw ===
The next day, the aliens fill the Thames with red weed, draining all the water and immobilising the Nautilus. Hyde refuses to wait until Nemo's crew have cleared the red weed and goes back to headquarters. In South Downs, Mina and Allan are searching for the scientist in a forest. Mina is angry at Allan for how he reacted to her scars, but he explains that he was not repulsed by them, as they merely reminded him of his second wife, Stella, who was similarly scarred in a fire. They have sex again by a tree, but are confronted by a bear-like creature capable of speech and dressed in tattered human clothes. Joined by other talking animals, the bear takes them to the hideout of Dr. Moreau, who has relocated to the countryside and continues to create human-animal hybrids (humorously, all of Dr. Moreau's hybrids resemble anthropomorphic animal characters from children's fiction, including Puss in Boots, Mother Goose, and Mole, Rat, Badger and Toad from The Wind in the Willows). Mina explains that MI5 has asked for something called "H-142", and while Moreau is seemingly disturbed by this request, he obliges nonetheless.

In London, Hyde waits at the headquarters for Griffin to reappear. When he does, still trying to hide through invisibility, Hyde reveals that he has infrared vision, and has therefore always been able to see Griffin. He savagely beats Griffin and rapes him, leaving the "Invisible Man" to die in agony. Later that evening, Hyde has dinner with Nemo and the League's coachman Samson at the headquarters, but blood stains slowly appear on his clothes and the tablecloth, and Nemo finds Griffin's dead body, now visible again. He is horrified and prepares to kill Hyde, but Samson urges him to stand down, as Hyde's great strength may be useful against the aliens, and he grudgingly agrees.

=== Issue #6: "You Should See Me Dance the Polka..." ===
Mina and Allan bid farewell to Dr. Moreau at a train station, and return to London by train with the cargo crate carrying H-142 (which they assume is another hybrid animal). They are met by Bond and agents wearing gas masks, and proceed to London Bridge, where Nemo and Hyde are waiting for them. Bond explains that every bridge in the city except London Bridge has been made impassable in a bid to slow the alien advance, and as he leaves with H-142's crate, the aliens destroy the last of London's defences and gather all their forces for their final push into the city.

Hyde agrees to distract the Tripods while H-142 is delivered, but before he goes he bids Mina a fond farewell and asks for a kiss, which she graciously agrees to. He joyfully dances out onto the bridge toward an oncoming Tripod, singing See Me Dance the Polka (which was featured in the Spencer Tracy adaptation of Jekyll and Hyde). While his skin is burned off by a heat-ray, he survives, topples one of the Tripods and starts eating the alien inside. The other Tripods combine their heat-rays and kill Hyde, but the fallen Tripod blocks the bridge, stranding them on the South Bank. Military Intelligence fires the cannon, delivering H-142 to the aliens. Bond reveals the British government's strategy: while H-142 is one of Moreau's hybrids, it is actually a hybrid bacterium made from a mixture of anthrax and streptococcus, intended to attack and destroy the Martians through disease warfare. Nemo is outraged by this reckless use of biological weaponry, resigning from the League and leaving in the Nautilus.

One month later, Mina and Allan are walking through Serpentine Park (which Allan mentions is going to be renamed "Hyde Park" in honour of Hyde's sacrifice). Mina says recent events have left her deeply unsettled, so she is going to stay at Coradine, a ladies' commune in Scotland. She leaves, and the story ends with Allan sitting alone on a park bench.

== Extra material ==
Just as in the first volume, the back of the second contains additional information on the League and its world. The chief is The New Traveller's Almanac, serialised in the back of the six issues and collected in the volume, serving as a guide to the world of The League of Extraordinary Gentlemen, including numerous references to classic and modern fictional works, e.g. the City of Opar, and Laputa, narrated by the creators.

Other parts include a cover gallery, a playable "Game of Extraordinary Gentlemen", an impossible "Nemo's origami Nautilus", a cautionary fable to complaining fans, and "Campion Bond's moral maze".

== Reception ==
Volume II received the 2003 Eisner Award for Best Finite Series/Limited Series. Time magazine listed it as the ninth-best comic of 2003. It was nominated for the 2003 Bram Stoker Award for Best Illustrated Narrative, but lost to The Sandman: Endless Nights. It was included in the 2005 edition of The Year's Best Graphic Novels, Comics, & Manga.

== Collected editions ==
The series has been collected into the following volumes:

- Hardcover: ISBN 1-4012-0117-2
- Paperback: ISBN 1-4012-0118-0
- Absolute edition (deluxe hardcover): ISBN 1-4012-0611-5, including Moore's original scripts and additional artwork by O'Neill

== Annotations ==
Jess Nevins' annotations for this volume are available in a book entitled A Blazing World: The Unofficial Companion to the Second League of Extraordinary Gentlemen and features interviews and commentary by Alan Moore and Kevin O'Neill; detailed, panel-by-panel annotations; and a cover by John Picacio.

== See also ==
- Scarlet Traces
- Rainbow Mars
- "Mars: The Home Front" from War of the Worlds: Global Dispatches
- The Martian War
