= The League of Extraordinary Gentlemen (novel) =

2003 novel by Kevin J. Anderson

- First edition cover
- Author: Kevin J. Anderson
- Language: English
- Series: The League of Extraordinary Gentlemen
- Genre: Movie novelization Steampunk; Superhero
- Publisher: Pocket Star Books
- Publication date: July 1, 2003
- Publication place: United States
- Media type: Paperback
- Pages: 288
- ISBN: 0-7434-7676-X (first edition, paperback)
- OCLC: 52533884

The League of Extraordinary Gentlemen is a 2003 steampunk superhero novel by Kevin J. Anderson. It is a novelization of the script of the movie of the same name, written by James Dale Robinson, which itself was based on the comic by Alan Moore and Kevin O'Neill.

== Background ==
In late 2002, Anderson had just finished working on his novel Captain Nemo: The Fantastic History of a Dark Genius, set in a world where Jules Verne had drawn inspiration for his works from (fictional) real-life events, individuals, and technological developments. Anderson was just beginning to work on the book that would become The Martian War, a similar premise but with H.G. Wells. Anderson had done media tie-in work before (for franchises such as Star Wars, The X-Files, and StarCraft) and was a long-time fan of Alan Moore's work, including the original League comic. It was on the basis of that experience that Pocket Books approached him to write the novelization.

== Writing process ==
Anderson has called the original movie script "very airy" and noted that "some characters have been added or deleted, some character traits have been changed (unfortunately, in my opinion, because of political correctness)", while still praising the work of Robinson. Anderson turned the 120-page script into the final 288-page book by expanding scenes deleted from the final movie, expanding characterization and background information, and "wherever possible and appropriate [going] back to Moore's original graphic novel for that material and [using] what I can".

== Differences from the sources ==
Although differing somewhat from the movie script, and drawing on the original comic, Anderson still noted that "and of course another drawback is that I have to stick to the script exactly as it is, even if I might have different ideas"; as such, the result is much closer to the film than the comic or a third, independent story.

=== Differences from the movie ===
- A scene featuring the Fantom's attack on the German Zeppelin works, including the capture of Karl Draper, a character cut from the movie.
- The subplot revolving around Draper and his daughter, Eva, is included in the novel.
- When the Fantom's men attack Quartermain/Quatermain's club, the bartender has several lines of dialogue, a couple of them taken from an elderly hunter who fights alongside Allen and survives the shootout in the club (although his fate after the bombing is unclear) in the film but is shot dead by an assassin in the book.
- There is an actual meeting of European leaders in Venice, as opposed to the 'meeting' being a ruse in the film, thus closing one of the plot holes from the film script.
- M's true identity is revealed earlier than in the movie.
- The book ends with the League assembled outside of the Fantom's Mongolian fortress, not at Quatermain's funeral in Africa.

=== Additions to the movie ===
- Several characters, including Sawyer and a British constable in the opening chapter, explicitly connect the Fantom with the Phantom from The Phantom of the Opera. After the Fantom's real identity is revealed, the Phantom is explained as being his model.
- The Fantom's aide is identified as Lieutenant Dante.
- In Nairobi, Nigel (in guise as Quatermain) remarks on how "the press" always misspells the name as Quartermain (a common mistake in the reviews and press for the movie), and also mentions Quatermain's discovery of King Solomon's Mines and encounter with Ayesha. Quatermain later compares Mina to Ayesha, and also mentions the Lost City of Gold and Umslopogaas.
- When he is first introduced, Quatermain is reading an H. G. Wells story from Strand Magazine.
- When being led into the League's headquarters deep underground, Quatermain jokes about whether the architect discovered a "passage to the center of the Earth".
- Sir Richard Burton is implied to be a member of a previous League.
- The other members of the League express confusion at Nemo's car, and he explains how it is based on Henry Ford and Karl Benz.
- Gray says that he is no longer on speaking terms with Oscar Wilde (presumably due to the latter's portrayal of him).
- Nemo notices that Gray's library is filled with books by the Marquis de Sade and illustrated guides to sadomasochism.
- Sawyer mentions his Aunt Polly and Injun Joe, and that he once worked as a detective.
- Gray offers Mina a nightcap of amontillado from a cask he found in a walled-up room in the basement of a villa.
- Ishmael compares the damage to the Nautilus in Venice to the damage it received in fighting the giant squid, and Nemo mentions their adventures "under the polar icecaps, through the Suez Canal, finding Atlantis, undersea volcanoes..." all being references to Twenty Thousand Leagues Under the Seas.
- The man who becomes first mate after Ishmael is named as Patel.
- In his confession recording, the Fantom compares the League negatively to Sexton Blake, Robur the Conqueror, and Frankenstein's monster.
- Sawyer specifically identifies his childhood friend killed by the Fantom as being Huckleberry Finn.
- M's fortress is stated as being made by a tsar allied with a band of Cossacks who planned to conquer all of Europe and Asia.
- When seeing the captive families of M's scientists, Nemo thinks back to his dead wife and son.
- When M's true identity is revealed, mention is made of Sherlock Holmes and the fight at Reichenbach Falls.
- The enemy invisible man from the end fight is identified as M's henchman from the beginning of the film/book, Sanderson Reed.

=== Additional connections with the comic ===
- M names the original invisible man as Dr. Hawley Griffin.
- Skinner asks Mina if she is "still upset about that little incident at Miss Rosa Coote's Correctional Academy for Wayward Gentlewomen", with Mina then giving a quick overview of the event.
- Skinner often finishes sentences with "Aheheh", as Griffin did in the comic.
- Quatermain shows anger at Mina acting as if she is the League's head, a reference to her holding that role in the comic.
- Hyde is said to be captured in the Rue Morgue, and Inspector Dupin is mentioned.
- Quatermain's rifle is specifically said to be an elephant gun.
- In M's fortress, Nemo and Hyde's rescue of the captive families and fighting M's men is reminiscent of their work against Fu Manchu and Moriarty's strongholds in the comic.
- In the flashback to Reichenbach Falls after M's reveal, dialog from the same scene in the comic is quoted verbatim. The scene itself is based on the events of the Sherlock Holmes story "The Final Problem".
- In the end of the novel, Campion Bond arrives, and mentions the astronomer Ogilvy's discovery of flashes on Mars and theory that it is an approaching invasion fleet (a reference to The War of the Worlds, the end of the first comic, and the plot of the second volume).
