= Fighting machine (The War of the Worlds) =

Fictional machine

- The War of the Worlds character
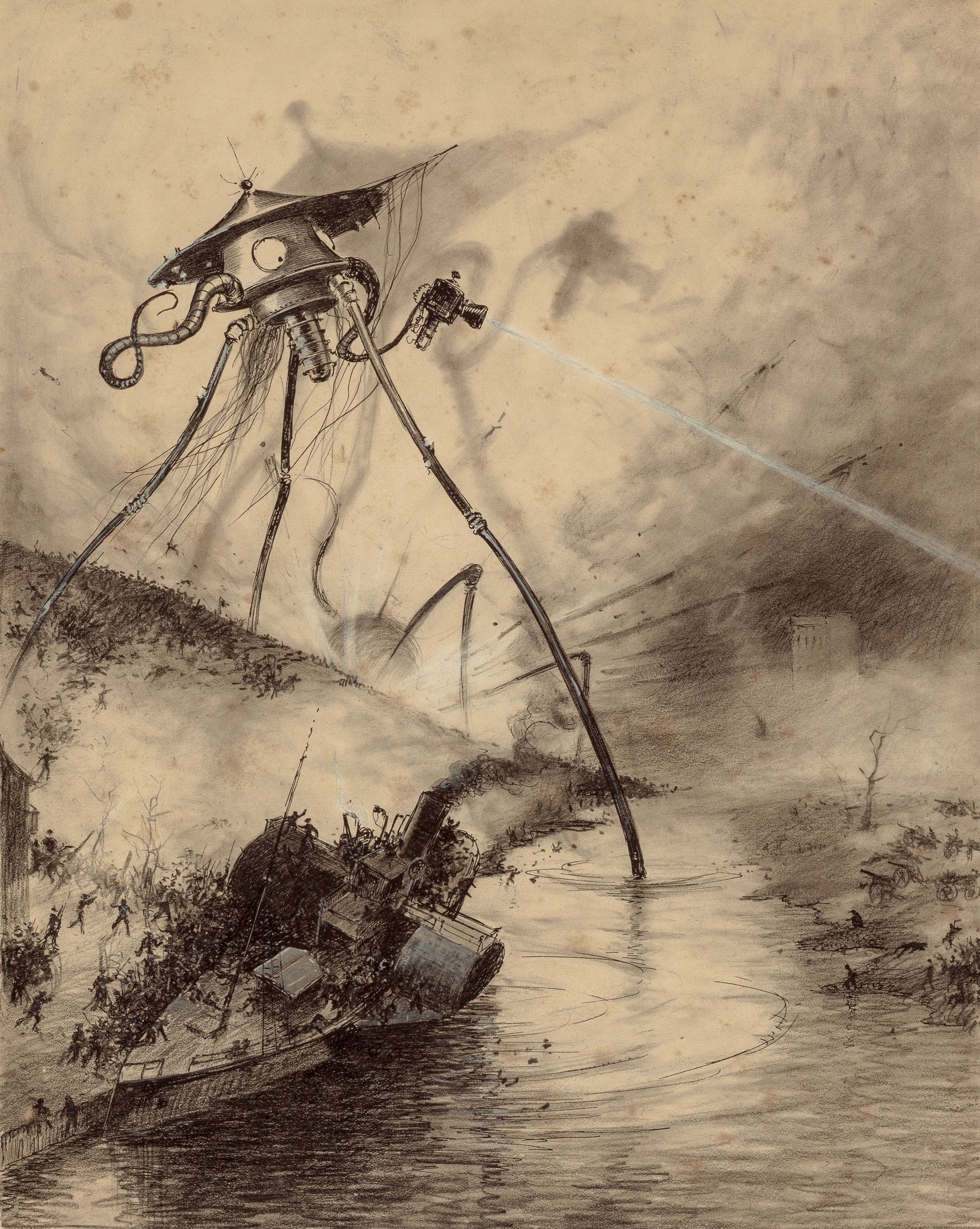
- Illustration by Henrique Alvim Corrêa, 1906
- First appearance: The War of the Worlds by H. G. Wells (1898)
- Created by: H.G. Wells

In-universe information
- Alias: Heron
- Nicknames: Tripod; Martian Fighting Machine; Martian War Machine
- Occupation: Military vehicle
- Nationality: Martian

The fighting machine (also known as a "Martian Tripod") is one of the fictional machines used by the Martians in H. G. Wells' 1898 classic science fiction novel The War of the Worlds. In the novel, it is a fast-moving three-legged walking vehicle reported to be 100 feet (30 meters) tall with multiple, whip-like tentacles used for grasping, and two lethal weapons: a heat-ray and a gun-like tube used for discharging canisters of a poisonous chemical black smoke. It is the primary machine the Martians use when they invade Earth, along with the handling machine, the flying machine, and the embankment machine.

== Description in the novel ==
The fighting machines are described as having three tall, articulated legs which spurt green gas from their joints, with a grouping of long, whip-like metallic tentacles hanging beneath the silver central body, atop the main body a brass coloured hood-like head houses a sole Martian operator.. The wheel is apparently unknown to the Martians, who use electromagnetic artificial muscles instead. In chapter 10, Wells' narrator first describes the appearance and movement of the machines;

A monstrous tripod, higher than many houses… a walking engine of glittering metal… imagine a milking stool tilted and bowled violently along the ground… But instead of a milking stool imagine it a great body of machinery on a tripod stand

— Chapter 10, "In The Storm"

In the novel, the armaments of the fighting machines include a directed-energy incendiary weapon fired from a camera-shaped device held by an articulated arm. They also had gun-like tubes which could deploy a poisonous gas. The fighting machines could also discharge steam through nozzles that dissipates the black smoke, which then settles as an inert, powdery substance.

The metallic tentacles, which hang below the main fighting machine body, are used as probes and for grasping objects. The novel is indeterminate regarding the height of the fighting machines; as in the novel, a newspaper article describes them to be more than 100 feet (30 m) tall. HMS Thunder Child, a Royal Navy torpedo ram, engages a trio of tripods that are pursuing a refugee flotilla heading to France from the southeast English coast; the Thunder Child is eventually destroyed by the Martian heat-ray, but not before taking out two fighting machines.

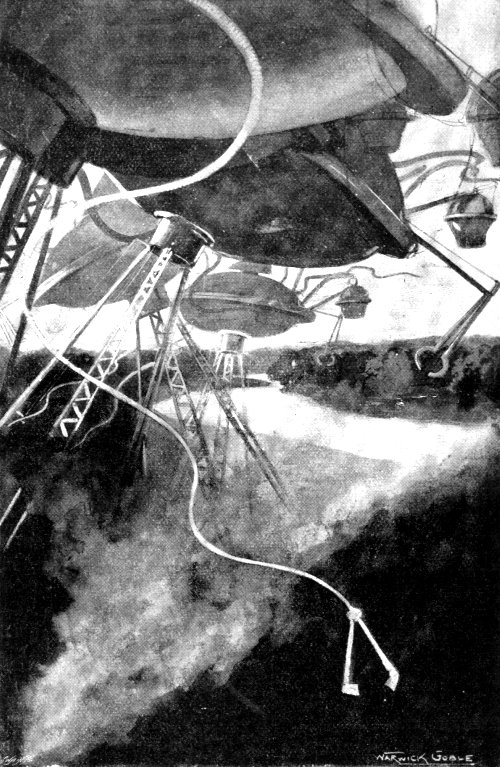
Martian tripods drawn by Warwick Goble in 1897. These were disliked and criticized by Wells.

The original conceptual drawings for the fighting machines, drawn by Warwick Goble, accompanied the initial appearance of The War of the Worlds in Pearson's Magazine in 1897. Wells criticized the illustrations, writing in later editions of the story:

I recall particularly the illustration of one of the first pamphlets to give a consecutive account of the war. The artist had evidently made a hasty study of one of the fighting-machines, and there his knowledge ended. He presented them as tilted, stiff tripods, without either flexibility or subtlety, and with an altogether misleading monotony of effect. The pamphlet containing these renderings had a considerable vogue, and I mention them here simply to warn the reader against the impression they may have created. They were no more like the Martians I saw in action than a Dutch doll is like a human being. To my mind, the pamphlet would have been much better without them.

— Chapter 19, "What We Saw from the Ruined House"

== Adaptations ==
=== Ray Harryhausen's unmade film ===
In the artwork for Ray Harryhausen's unmade 1950s War of the Worlds movie, the fighting machines are based on flying saucers walking upon three legs with spiked feet, and fire their heat rays from the rims of their bodies.

=== The War of the Worlds (1953 film) ===
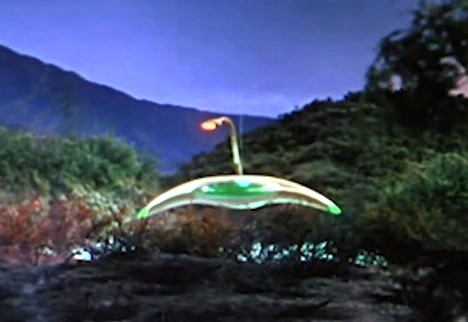
One of the Martian machines in the 1953 film adaptation

The Martian fighting machines, designed by Albert Nozaki for George Pal's 1953 Paramount film The War of the Worlds, barely resemble the same machines in the H. G. Wells novel. The novel's fighting machines are 10-story tall tripods and carry the heat-ray projector on an articulated arm connected to the front of the machine's main body, as well as possessing the poison black smoke canisters fired from gun-like tubes. In the film version, the war machines instead possess two different types of death ray weapons. The first is a visible, reddish heat-ray, atop a swiveling goose-neck, mounted in a cobra-like head, while the second type of death ray each Martian machine uses has pulsing wingtip ray emitters that cause subatomic disintegration to whatever they shoot. The film's war machines move about on three invisible legs of energy, which are only briefly visible when moving on the ground upon leaving their initial landing site.

=== Television series ===
The serialized War of the Worlds (1988–1990) television series was established as a sequel to the 1953 film with much of the alien technology in the first season cued with visual references to the design of those in the aforementioned film. An older model of the 1953 film's craft is shown to have physical legs more similar to the novel version.

=== War of the Worlds (2005 film) ===
There are several differences between the fighting machines as described in Wells' novel and those in Steven Spielberg's 2005 film, which come from an undisclosed alien world. In this version the tripods were long ago brought to Earth, having been buried underground sometime in the past. The aliens instead travel in capsules to their buried machines, which transport them underground to the Tripods. The fighting machines in this movie also have the roles of the Martian handling machines with the fighting machines capturing humans and placing them into two containers where they are harvested one-by-one. Rather than burning humans, the fighting machines' weapons can disintegrate humans into ash leaving their clothing intact. In a published interview screenwriter David Koepp stated his belief that they were planted by these extraterrestrials as a part of some kind of alien "contingency plan" (said plan never being revealed to the audience).

While the Tripods don't arrive to Earth in cylinders, before they emerge, the ground cracks and then rotates in a similar fashion to the cylinder's lid from the novel.

=== H.G. Wells' The War of the Worlds (2005 film) ===
In Pendragon Pictures' direct-to-DVD H.G. Wells' The War of the Worlds the tripods have a large, free-moving head atop the smaller main body, giving its sole Martian occupant a panoramic view. It has three thick, metallic tentacles, which are held on high, made up of boxy-looking segments, making them appear like large bicycle chains rather than slim and whip-like, as described in Wells' novel; they are used mainly to capture humans during the film. The tripods have three long, ridged, and stilt-like legs, which occasionally stride with the right and rear leg moving forward together in a clumsy, unconvincing manner.

==== War of the Worlds 2: The Next Wave ====
In the Asylum's 2008 sequel War of the Worlds 2: The Next Wave, the walkers are tripods called squid-walkers, and are capable of flight. Unlike the first film, the Martians do not control the fighting machines directly from the inside but manipulate cyborgs by remote control. A heat-ray is attached to the walkers, as well as a kind of ray that teleports humans directly to the alien mothership, where humans are then drained of their blood to feed the invaders. Whereas Wells' fighting machines carried cages to hold captured humans, these tripods place humans directly into the tripods' interiors. These appear organic, with no windows or controls, and the walls absorb anyone unlucky enough to touch them, sending them to an unknown destination.

=== Jeff Wayne's Musical Version of The War of the Worlds ===
The fighting machines are described in Jeff Wayne's Musical Version of The War of the Worlds and depicted on the album artwork painted by Michael Trim. This version of the tripods has major inconsistencies when compared to Wells' description in the novel. Presumably, for that reason, it is one of the most popular depictions.

=== BBC War of the Worlds miniseries ===
In the 2019 BBC miniseries, the Tripods are made from black tree-like materials which cracks and breaks when they move and walk. Rather than arriving in cylinders like in the novel, the fighting machines arrive on Earth in the form of large black spheres. The spheres would begin to spin in a fast speed and hover above the ground shooting heat rays at any human victim setting them ablaze. Afterwards, the spheres burst into dust and settle into the ground where the Tripods are formed, seemingly from the ground. The fighting machines' arsenal includes a powerful laser which fires from their singular eye and Black Smoke which causes their victims to spew black liquid from their mouths once inhaled.

=== War of the Worlds: The Attack ===
The Tripods in the 2023 film War of the Worlds: The Attack are presented with spider-like elements such as multiple eyes.

=== Fox's War of the Worlds ===
In the Fox series, the fighting machines' roles are taken by small robotic dogs inspired by the military robot dogs.

=== War of the Worlds (2025 film) ===
In Universal Pictures' War of the Worlds released on Amazon Prime Video, the fighting machines resemble the ones from the 2005 film, but are also seen with the ability to drop their legs and fly in a similar fashion to the 1953 iteration. The aliens disperse to harvest data from a surveillance operation system known as "Goliath", which allows them to strengthen their machines and continue to defeat human forces. The government knew the aliens previously invaded earth and activated "Goliath" to alert them. The military plans to bomb DHS headquarters to ensure the aliens can't access "Goliath". When the system is shut down, the bombing is called off and the aliens are defeated.

=== Parallel and sequel novels ===
In Kevin J. Anderson' The Martian War the Martians use two types of tripods, the ones from The War of the Worlds and a smaller, "overseer" variant. In Sherlock Holmes's War of the Worlds, it is hinted that the Martians may have accelerated their evolution using selective breeding and eugenics, and that their original body type may have resembled the form of the tripods.

== Influence on later fiction ==
Creatures and machines similar to the fighting machines are featured in video games, such as the Annihilator Tripods from Command & Conquer 3, or the Striders from Half-Life, specifically Half-Life 2 and its episodes. An enemy alien faction featured in Helldivers 2, the Illuminate, includes the Harvester.

== Inaccurate coinage ==
In 2021, the Royal Mint announced a new version of the UK two pound coin minted in tribute to H.G. Wells. The coins bear an image of a Martian Fighting Machine with four instead of three legs, and The Invisible Man wearing the wrong style hat, resulting in derision from fans and collectors of Wells' work.
