= The League of Extraordinary Gentlemen, Volume One =

Comic book

- Cover

Publication information
- Publisher: WildStorm (DC Comics)
- Schedule: Irregular
- Format: Limited series
- Genre: Alternate history Steampunk
- Publication date: March 1999 - September 2000
- No. of issues: 6
- Main character(s): Mina Murray; Allan Quatermain; Hawley Griffin; Dr. Henry Jekyll/Mr. Edward Hyde; Captain Nemo

Creative team
- Written by: Alan Moore
- Artist: Kevin O'Neill
- Letterer: Bill Oakley
- Colorist: Benedict Dimagmaliw
- Editor: Scott Dunbier

Collected editions
- Hardcover: ISBN 1-56389-665-6
- Paperback: ISBN 1-56389-858-6
- Absolute edition: ISBN 1-4012-0052-4

The League of Extraordinary Gentlemen, Volume One is a comic book limited series written by Alan Moore and illustrated by Kevin O'Neill, published under the America's Best Comics imprint of DC Comics in the United States and under Vertigo in the United Kingdom. It is the first story in the larger League of Extraordinary Gentlemen series. The story takes place in 1898 in a fictional world where all of the characters and events from Victorian literature (and possibly the entirety of fiction) coexist. The characters and plot elements borrow from works of writers such as Jules Verne, Sir Arthur Conan Doyle, Bram Stoker, H. G. Wells, and Robert Louis Stevenson.

== Plot ==
=== Issue #1: Empire Dreams ===
In 1898, one year after her encounter with Dracula, Mina Murray has divorced her husband and now works for the British government. She meets with MI5 agent Campion Bond (the grandfather of James Bond), who gives her the task of gathering selected members for the League of Extraordinary Gentlemen, a secret task force whose job is to protect the British Empire from potential threats. Captain Nemo escorts Mina to Egypt, where she finds a heavily intoxicated Allan Quatermain in an opium den. Two Arab men enter the den and attempt to rape Mina, but Allan intervenes and kills one of them. As the other man rushes off to tell the authorities, Mina drags Allan through the busy streets towards the docks, where Nemo's submarine, the Nautilus, emerges from the sea. Nemo fends off the Egyptian police with a harpoon gun, and Allan is brought on board the Nautilus to recover from his opium addiction.

For their next assignment, the League travels to Paris and meet with C. Auguste Dupin to investigate a recent string of violent murders. Mina poses as a prostitute to lure the killer into a trap, but is kidnapped. Allan and Dupin trace the killer to his apartment and find Mina, but are attacked by a large monster.

=== Issue #2: Ghosts & Miracles ===
After a brief fight, Allan forces the monster out of the apartment window, and the fall renders it unconscious. Once on the Nautilus, the monster transforms into a frail, terrified man with no memory of recent events. The man is Dr. Henry Jekyll, while the monster is his alter ego Mr. Hyde. Mina bids farewell to Dupin, and the Nautilus leaves Paris. When the League returns to London, Bond sets them their next task: going undercover at a girls' school to investigate three separate cases of sexless conception.

Mina, Allan and Nemo visit the school undercover and meet the dominatrix headmistress, Rosa Coote. The girls believe they have been impregnated by the Holy Spirit, and the league stay the night for their investigation. Late at night, Mina catches an unseen force sexually assaulting one of the girls, Pollyanna, and throws a tin of paint over it, making the entity partly visible. The League successfully apprehends the "Holy Spirit", which is actually Hawley Griffin, the Invisible Man, and takes him to their new headquarters within the secret annexe of the British Museum. Bond promises Griffin that if he agrees to work for them, he will be granted a pardon for his past crimes and MI5 will research a cure for Griffin's invisibility.

=== Issue #3: Mysteries of the East ===
With the League fully assembled, Bond gives them the task of recovering a stolen supply of Cavorite from a crime lord referred to as "The Doctor" (an alias for Fu Manchu, as the name was not allowed to be used in the comics due to trademark issues). He explains that Britain was secretly planning a Moon landing to coincide with the turn of the 20th century celebrations, supervised by Professor Selwyn Cavor and using Cavorite to power and levitate heavier-than-air machines.

The League is dispatched to London's Limehouse district in order to learn more about The Doctor. Mina and Griffin question Quong Lee (a storyteller from books by Thomas Burke), who reveals that The Doctor is indeed operating within the area, but only gives them information in the form of a cryptic riddle: "The waters lap beneath the heavenly bridge. The dragon sleeps below it. My advice to you: do not awaken it". Although Griffin is sceptical, Mina concludes that The Doctor's activities must be taking place beneath Rotherhithe Bridge.

Meanwhile, Allan and Dr. Jekyll enter The Doctor's lair, where they spy on him carving Chinese symbols into a man's flesh with acid. The league regroups on the Nautilus and organises their evidence. Mina believes The Doctor has stolen the Cavorite for some nefarious purpose, and suspects that he is building an aerial war machine in the unfinished Rotherhithe Tunnel. She and Allan return to the Limehouse district to investigate activity around the abandoned Rotherhithe Tunnel, and eventually find a large cavern where The Doctor's airship (the "dragon" from Quong Lee's riddle) is being constructed.

=== Issue #4: Gods of Annihilation ===
Allan and Mina infiltrate The Doctor's lair, but are caught by a guard. An unnoticed Griffin kills the guard and Allan disguises himself in his uniform, planning to get inside the airship and steal back the Cavorite. Griffin meets with Jekyll and tells him to create a distraction. Jekyll turns into Mr. Hyde and starts slaughtering the guards, while Allan and Mina sneak into the ship, locate the Cavorite engine and steal it. They reunite with Hyde and Griffin in an underwater glass tunnel, but are cornered by more guards. To escape, Allan shoots a hole in the glass and Mina activates the Cavorite, propelling them upwards through the cascading water. The Doctor's lair is flooded, the ship is destroyed, and the Nautilus rescues the league as they fall back down into the Thames.

Bond congratulates the league on their success, and leaves the Nautilus with the Cavorite, telling them he will take it back to his superior M. A suspicious Griffin follows Bond back to the Military Intelligence Headquarters, and discovers that M is in fact criminal mastermind Professor James Moriarty.

=== Issue #5: "Some Deep, Organizing Power..." ===
A flashback shows the climax of Arthur Conan Doyle's short story "The Final Problem", in which Sherlock Holmes and Professor Moriarty have their final confrontation atop the Reichenbach Falls in Switzerland. Moriarty, however, survives his fall into the water below (although his spine and right arm are broken and heal in a deformed state), and is rescued by Campion Bond and Colonel Sebastian Moran. His criminal empire is in fact a front created by British Intelligence, which Moriarty now controls along with London's West end criminal underworld, while The Doctor controls the East.

Moriarty has built his own aerial warship, which he can now power with the Cavorite. Griffin returns to the Nautilus and informs the league of what he has discovered, and that Moriarty plans to bomb London's East end and destroy what remains of The Doctor's criminal empire.

=== Issue #6: The Day of Be-With-Us ===
Moriarty launches his airship and starts to bomb the East end of London. While the Doctor sends armed boarders to the airship on gliders, the League boards the Victoria, a hot-air balloon Nemo had stored on the Nautilus, and anchor it to the airship. While Mr. Hyde and Nemo attack the crew, Mina and Allan ascend to the top deck where Moriarty is waiting for them. Allan guns down the guards, but Moriarty shoots him in the shoulder and prepares to kill him. Mina smashes the Cavorite engine's container with a monkey wrench, and Moriarty rushes toward the device, grabs onto it, and is propelled into the night sky. The League leave the airship in the Victoria, and are once again rescued by the Nautilus, this time manned by Nemo's first mate Ishmael (the narrator from Moby-Dick).

The story ends with Mycroft Holmes (the brother of Sherlock Holmes) becoming the new director of British Intelligence, congratulating the League for their work, and telling them to remain in London should there be further need for them in the future. Meanwhile, Martian ships fall from the sky and descend on Woking, setting in motion the second volume.

== Extra material ==
Each issue of the comic also includes a chapter of a short illustrated prose prequel called Allan and the Sundered Veil, which features Allan Quatermain, John Carter, H. P. Lovecraft's Randolph Carter, and the Time Traveller from H. G. Wells' The Time Machine. The entire story is included in the book version of Volume One.

Also at the back of Volume One are several extras, including the covers of all issues contained in the volume. Also included is a "paint by numbers" drawing attributed to Basil Hallward, who was the painter of the eponymous The Picture of Dorian Gray in the novel. A second version is seen two pages later, coloured, and clearly intended to be the portrait towards the end of the novel when Gray's painted visage has become decrepit and horrid, thus reflecting Gray's personality. The blurb about the paint-by-numbers drawing mentions Hallward's mysterious disappearance, which is a reference to a part of the novel where Dorian Gray, upset that Hallward found out about the fate of his artwork, kills Hallward and has a friend dispose of the body, leaving no trace of evidence. The blurb for the second version of the drawing also mentions failed attempts at a paint-by-numbers by Richard Pickman (of "Pickman's Model") and a cabinet-making kit by Caligari (of The Cabinet of Dr. Caligari).

A painting of Nemo's submarine, the Nautilus, in the background of the cover of Volume One also bears Hallward's signature.

== Second press run on issue #5 ==
Issue #5 contained an authentic vintage advertisement for a Marvel-brand douche. Marvel Comics is DC's chief competitive rival within the comics industry and Moore had had a public dispute with Marvel, his former employer. This ad caused DC executive Paul Levitz to order the entire print run destroyed and reprinted with the offending advertisement edited.

In a later title, Moore creates a "Miracle Douche Recall" headline on a newspaper, which is not only a reference to the furor, but is also a reference to the Marvelman, when Marvel Comics had previously retitled Marvelman, which was written by Alan Moore, to Miracleman, despite Marvelman having been around for 40 years.

== Awards ==
Volume I won the 2000 Bram Stoker Award for Best Illustrated Narrative.

== Collected editions ==
- Hardcover: ISBN 1-56389-665-6
- Paperback: ISBN 1-56389-858-6
- Absolute edition (deluxe hardcover): ISBN 1-4012-0052-4, including Moore's original scripts and additional artwork by O'Neill

== Annotations ==
Jess Nevins' annotations for this volume are available in a book entitled Heroes & Monsters: The Unofficial Companion to the League of Extraordinary Gentlemen and features:

- Annotations to the "League of Extraordinary Gentlemen", revised and expanded from the versions previously available online.
- Essays by Nevins on the history of the "Yellow Peril" archetype, pivotal to the first LOEG miniseries; on the origin of the "crossover" concept and team-ups in fiction; and on the Victorian character archetypes present in the LOEG miniseries.
- Biographies of the main characters in the LOEG miniseries
- Biographies of the authors whose creations are featured in the LOEG series.
- Interviews with and commentary by the creators of the LOEG
- An introduction by Alan Moore

== Film ==
Elements from Volume One are present in the loose 2003 film adaptation. Similar to the comic, Professor Moriarty is revealed to be the antagonist in the film, though here he physically approaches the League as M, with no presence of Campion Bond. The revelation is not made clear until well into the film's climax, with no reference to Sherlock Holmes or Moriarty apparent at any earlier point. The film also mimics Volume One in a sequence where the Invisible Man (here named Rodney Skinner, a thief who stole Griffin's invisibility formula) departs from the team to spy on the antagonists while the League wrongly accuses him of betraying the group. Subtle references to the comic are also made in the background, such as a mutual newspaper front page which speculates the Martian phenomenon leading to the Martian invasion from H. G. Wells' The War of the Worlds.
