= The League of Extraordinary Gentlemen (soundtrack) =

Film score by Various
- Released: August 1, 2003
- Genre: Soundtrack
- Length: 54 minutes
- Label: Varèse Sarabande

The League of Extraordinary Gentlemen is the soundtrack from the 2003 film The League of Extraordinary Gentlemen, released by Varèse Sarabande on August 1, 2003. The music was composed by Trevor Jones and Joseph Shabalala, and performed by the London Symphony Orchestra (conducted by Geoffrey Alexander). The Ladysmith Black Mambazo choral group performed the songs "Kenya - Wait For Me" and "Son of Africa". The soundtrack was not released in stores in the United States, and was at first released only for iTunes. After this did not generate satisfactory sales, it was released by the Varèse Sarabande label for purchase online.

== Track listing ==
1. Dawn of a New Century
2. Kenya - Wait for Me
3. Task Requires Heroes
4. Promenade by the Sea
5. Nautilus - Sword of the Ocean
6. The Game Is On
7. Old Tiger
8. Capturing Mr. Hyde
9. Mina Harker's Secret
10. Phantom's Lair
11. Portrait of Dorian Gray
12. Treachery
13. Storming the Fortress
14. May This New Century Be Yours
15. Son of Africa
