= The Soul Selects Her Own Society =

Short story by Connie Willis

"The Soul Selects Her Own Society: Invasion and Repulsion: A Chronological Reinterpretation of Two of Emily Dickinson's Poems: A Wellsian Perspective" is a 1996 science fiction short story by Connie Willis. It was first published in Asimov's Science Fiction in April 1996, but written for the anthology War of the Worlds: Global Dispatches, in which it was published in June 1996; it was subsequently republished in War of the Worlds: Fresh Perspectives on the H. G. Wells Classic (2005), in This is My Funniest: Leading Science Fiction Writers Present Their Funniest Stories Ever (2006), in The Winds of Marble Arch and Other Stories (2007), and in The Best of Connie Willis: Award-Winning Stories (2013).

== Synopsis ==
Rather than being a conventional narrative, "Selects" is presented as a literature student's dissertation. The student argues that several passages in newly-discovered Emily Dickinson poems (which, the student asserts, must be genuine poems because if they were not, then there would be no dissertation) indicate that Dickinson witnessed the 1897 Martian invasion depicted by H. G. Wells — and that since Dickinson died in 1886, the only way she could have written poems about the invasion was for her to have been a zombie.

== Awards ==
"Selects" won the 1997 Hugo Award for Best Short Story.

== Reception ==
A. M. Dellamonica has described it as "especially great"; however, The Wellsian (the official journal of the H. G. Wells Society) considers it to be "gibberish" which "wastes the reader's time." "Selects" was omitted from the 2015 German translation of Best of Connie Willis, because "the publisher felt that the humor didn't translate well".
