= Martian (The War of the Worlds) =

Race of extraterrestrials from H.G. Wells' War of the Worlds

Martians
- The War of the Worlds characters
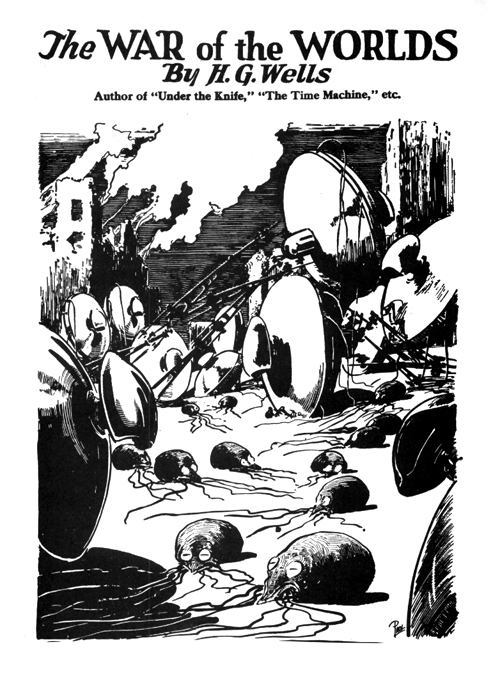
- Wells' Martians as featured in a 1927 Amazing Stories reprint edition, artwork by Frank R. Paul
- First appearance: The War of the Worlds; (1898)
- Created by: H. G. Wells

In-universe information
- Alias: Invaders
- Species: Octopus/Squid-like creatures
- Home: Mars

The Martians, also known as the Invaders, are the main antagonists in the H.G. Wells 1898 novel The War of the Worlds and its adaptations. Their efforts to exterminate the populace of the Earth and claim the planet for themselves drive the plot and present challenges for the novel's human characters. They are notable for their use of extraterrestrial weaponry far in advance of that of mankind at the time of the invasion. Common conceits of post-Wells version of the Martians did not actually originate on Mars and/or that sentient species from other works of early science fiction dwelled on the planet at the same time.

== In the novel ==
The Martians are described as octopus-like or squid-like creatures: the "body" consisting of a disembodied head nearly 4 ft (1.22 m) across, having two eyes; a V-shaped, beak-like mouth; and two branches each of eight 'almost whip-like' tentacles, grouped around the mouth, referred to as the 'hands'. They reproduce asexually, by "budding" off from a parent. Internally, the Martians consist of a brain, lungs, heart, and blood vessels; they have no organs for digestion, and therefore sustain themselves on Earth by mechanically transfusing blood via pipettes from other animals, notably humans. The ear, a single tympanic membrane located on the back of the head, is believed "useless" in Earth's denser atmosphere.

The Martians' arrival on Earth is aboard a large, cylindrical spacecraft launched from some sort of immense space gun on Mars. Their chief weapon of war is the Heat-Ray, a directed-energy weapon capable of incinerating any organism it strikes. This is mounted on an articulated arm attached to the front of the tall tripod, called a 'fighting-machine' in Wells' novel, which travels across the landscape destroying humans and their habitat. A secondary weapon, the "black smoke", is a toxic gas released from canisters launched at a distance from bazooka-like tubes, referred to in the novel as a "gun," which kills humans and animals alike; it is rendered harmless by Martian high-pressure steam jets and water, it is made of an unknown element but it is described to give off 4 blue lines on a spectroscope. Mention is also made of a Martian aircraft, but it is hardly seen, except to possibly spread the deadly Black Smoke from above over a wider area. A red weed (or red creeper) is left as an indicator of their presence with floral or fungal ties to their home world.

Evidence of a second race of Martians appears in the dominant race's cylindrical transport vessels, presumably for use as their food supply while in transit; however, they are all killed before the Martians reach Earth. These secondary Martians are bipedal, nearly 6 ft (1.83 m) tall, with "round, erect heads, and large eyes in flinty sockets"; however, their fragile physical structure, made up of weak skeletons and muscles, would have been broken by Earth's heavier gravitational pull. It is possible that these creatures are not native Martians, but similar to the Selenites described in Wells's other interplanetary work, The First Men in the Moon.

Based on their physical features, the Martians might be the descendants of a species similar to human beings, that evolution has reduced to only a large brain and head and two groupings of eight tentacles (hands). They are described as sluggish under terrestrial gravity, which is roughly three times as strong as that of Mars. It is reported that several Martians attempt to "stand" on their tentacles, implying that they are capable of locomotion in this manner while in Mars' lighter gravity, but not on Earth.

Communication between the Martians is never made evident, but the narrator, as he sees Martians working together without audible means, concludes that they use telepathy. He makes mention of a "queer hooting" sound but attributes it to the exhalation of air before fatally transfusing blood from their human victims. Some evidence of audible communication is associated with the Martian Fighting Machine, which is described with onomatopoeias, emitting siren-like "Aloo, aloo" calls, and the repeated "Ulla, ulla, ulla, ulla" call (similar to Ululation, however used as a cry of despair) that echoes throughout London after the mass death from bacterial infection of the Martians.

Despite their advancement, the Martians' technology lacks the wheel, and it is implied they are ignorant of disease and decomposition. It is theorized that their advanced technology eliminated whatever indigenous diseases were present on Mars, and so they no longer remembered their effects. Ultimately, their lack of knowledge or preparation against any bacteria indigenous to Earth causes their destruction here (though the epilogue states they may have successfully invaded Venus) by what Wells described as "putrefactive bacteria," which digests organic materials upon death.

== In other versions ==
Most adaptations of H.G. Wells' novel incorporate Martians as the invading race. A few draw upon their description from the original novel. Examples include the infamous radio adaptation, as well as musical version, and Pendragon film adaptations.

Versions of Wells' Martians differ from Wells' original. Apart from the Martians' battle cry, "Aloo", and the dying, "Ulla"), for example, many versions give them speech.

=== Literature ===
==== Edison's Conquest of Mars ====
Garrett P. Serviss's unauthorized 1898 novel Edison's Conquest of Mars is a sequel to Fighters from Mars, an unlicensed, altered American version of Wells's The War of the Worlds. The novel devotes considerable attention to the Martians, who are depicted in the text and illustrations as bug-eyed, 15-foot-tall humanoids capable of speech.

According to the novel, the Martians visited Earth around 7500 BC and built the Pyramids of Giza and the Great Sphinx of Giza as a memorial to their leader. When a plague forced them to return to Mars, they took with them several humans from the Fertile Crescent who had been transported to Egypt. The captives' descendants remained enslaved on Mars until they were wiped out in the aftermath of the Martian invasion of Earth, owing to the Martians' fear of humans. During the events of The War of the Worlds, the Martians were also at war with the giant inhabitants of Ceres.

The narrator describes the Martian emperor and government as follows:

At the top of the steps on a magnificent golden throne, sat the Emperor himself. There are some busts of Caracalla which I have seen that are almost as ugly as the face of the Martian ruler. He was of gigantic stature, larger than the majority of his subjects, and as near as I could judge must have been between 15 ft (4.57 m) and 16 ft (4.88 m) in height[...]I had also learned from [a Martian slave] that Mars was under a military government and that the military class had absolute control of the planet. I was somewhat startled, then, in looking at the head and centre of the great military system of Mars, to find in his appearance a striking confirmation of the speculations of our terrestrial phrenologists. His broad, misshapen head bulged in those parts where they had placed the so-called organs of combativeness, destructiveness, etc.

After their compatriots on Earth died, several surviving Martians are said to have returned to Mars by building another space cylinder and launching it from Bergen County, New Jersey. The blast from the launch is described as powerful enough to have destroyed the parts of New York City that the Martians had spared.

==== 20th century ====
In Manly Wade Wellman's Sherlock Holmes's War of the Worlds, Sir Arthur Conan Doyle's Sherlock Holmes, Dr. Watson, and Professor Challenger battle the aliens. It is hinted that the Martians have accelerated their evolution using selective breeding and eugenics, and that their original body type may have resembled the form of the tripods. The "Martians" originate from a more distant planet flooded with water, which puts the long legs of the Tripods into motion.

John Christopher's The Tripods novel series features an alien invasion by extraterrestrials invading Earth by means of machines reminiscent of Wells' tripod; but these are not used as war-machines, and the extraterrestrials commanding them do not use humans as prey.

In Don Webb's "To Mars and Providence", one of the stories included in the War of the Worlds: Global Dispatches anthology, the Martians are an extrasolar race with similarities to H. P. Lovecraft's Elder Things and Great Race of Yith. Edward Guimont argued that Lovecraft drew inspiration for his Cthulhu from Wells' Martians.

==== 21st century ====
In Larry Nivens' Rainbow Mars, they also appear as one of the many races from inhabiting Mars; killed not by bacteria but by the higher gravity of Earth, which caused organ ruptures and internal bleeding. They are mentioned as having launched two invasions of Earth, one in the early 20th century and the second in the 1950s (to correspond with the novel and 1953 movie).

=== Comics ===
In the Marvel comic book Killraven stories, the Martians return to Earth in the year 2001 in an alternate, post apocalypse version of the Marvel Universe. Killraven, alongside other heroes (including Spider-man, transported from the present day) fights the Martians and their human slaves.

The Martians would appear in 2010's The Avengers volume 4. When Kang's interference of the timestream shatters it, events of history occur in present-day New York City, including the arrival of Killraven and the Martians, piloting their Tripod walking machines. They are defeated by Thor. The Martians later appeared in 2015 in All-New Invaders #11-15. The story was collected under the title "The Martians are Coming"".

The League of Extraordinary Gentlemen, Volume II has the Martians being as foreign to the existing Martian civilization as they are to Earth, and evacuate the planet to conquer Earth after losing a war against the forces of John Carter and Gullivar Jones. It is said that the material they use to build their machines is secreted by the creatures themselves. By the year 2009, the Martians are believed by a post-Big Brother society to have been fiction.

In Superman: War of the Worlds, Lex Luthor helps the Martians, then betrays them.

Scarlet Traces has a Martian survivor helping the British prepare for a counter-invasion of Mars. It is revealed that the Martians came from a planet that exploded to form the asteroid belt; they then settled on Mars, driving the native species into extinction before launching similar wars against the races of Mercury, Venus, the Moon, and then Earth. A similar concept appears in Diane Duane's YA novel A Wizard of Mars.

=== Films ===
==== 1953 film ====
In the 1953 film adaptation, the Martians are short, brown creatures having three-fingered hands with suction cups at the end of long arms and a cyclopean eye divided into three sections: one red, one green, and one blue. The bottom-half of the creature is never fully shown; but blueprints show three legs having each a single suction-cup toe, similar to those on their fingers; other art shows two legs. No description of the alien's internal structure is given; but they are revealed to have blood, and their anemic blood cells are viewed by scientists under a microscope. As in other versions of the story, the Martians succumb to terrestrial bacteria. The aliens appear to have no use for human beings, unlike the original book's Martians who also used them as a blood supply.

===== Asylum films =====
In the Asylum film H.G. Wells' War of the Worlds, also known as "Invasion", the Martians resemble a short, green, disc-like head with four long tentacles acting as legs. Their feet have mouths having the ability to spit a deadly, corrosive acid. Inside these mouths are three tongues that closely resemble the Martians' fingers on the 1953 film version. On the DVD's Behind the Scenes feature, actor Jake Busey describes the aliens as looking like "floating pool chairs". It would appear that these Martians also have a need for human blood, and tend to appear mostly at night (possibly because sunlight on Mars is weaker than that on Earth). The cause of their deaths is uncertain, but it is presumably a virus. The main character, George Herbert, injects an alien with a rabies vaccine, with hope that "life fighting life" can stop them when guns and bombs have failed. At the end of the film, the aliens curiously stand paralysed when infected. Survivors confirm that they were infected by an airborne virus. They are not given the name "Martian" in the film, but are only named "aliens" once in the film, and a few times as "demons" by a Pastor. Their machines have six legs and resemble a crab, similar to the 'handling-machine' of the original novel.

In the sequel War of the Worlds 2: The Next Wave, the antagonists are the "squid-walkers", a cybernetic race of tripods controlled by a single entity inside their mothership. Inside the mothership, humans are kept alive and their blood is filtered, homogenised, and fed to the aliens. They are killed by infected blood injected into the mothership's core, telepathically shutting down the Tripods.

===== Pendragon Pictures film =====
In the film H.G. Wells' The War of the Worlds, the Martians are large, bullish creatures, keeping the two large eyes and tentacles described in the book; but do not seem to possess the beak-like mouth. They meet the same fate as the originals, having caught Earthly diseases. Their fighting-machines are extremely tall, with very long silver legs and numerous appendages, and emit a similar sound to the "Ulla" Wells described. The aliens crash to Earth in cylinders, which more closely resemble a meteorite (a similar aspect was used in the 1953 film adaptation), and spread their red weed during the invasion. They feed on human blood, extracted from the human prisoners via a Handling-machine. For these reasons, a character names them "vampires."

==== 2005 film ====
Little is known about the alien invaders in Steven Spielberg's 2005 film adaptation of War of the Worlds. On the DVD's 'Behind the Scenes' feature, Spielberg says

"The reason the word "Martian" is never said in this film is because my aliens are not from Mars. They [the aliens] probably come from as far away as E.T, but a much darker part of the universe."

Physiologically, these creatures have greenish/grey-colored skin, and are tripodal. Each limb ends with three fingers (resembling those from Byron Haskin's 1953 film version), and they also have two small limbs, also with three fingers, on their chest (similar to a theropod, or to the Xenomorph queen). The biological needs of this race are largely unknown. They somehow "ride lightning" in small transport pods during a storm to reach their buried Tripods. They require human blood; but only as part of their xenoforming project. Throughout the film, their tripods spill blood that is presumably connected to the invaders' needs. Indeed, in the script David Koepp refers to it as "lifeblood", though it is described as rose-colored, rather than the film's orange. Their red weed (or creeper) is left behind as residue of their Tripod experiments. In the climactic scene of the film, a downed tripod opens a hatch that belches the liquid before one of the sickly creatures crawls forth. The death of these invaders is evident as they seemingly dehydrate upon their death; but this occurs only in the end, and thus may be a result of their exposure to bacteria. These aliens do have a language, uttered amongst themselves at some point, and there is logographic writing seen on their tripods.

=== Television ===
One of the earliest known to take a new spin on the invaders was in a pilot presentation made by George Pal for an unrealized War of the Worlds TV series. Though Pal's 1953 film is established as a basis for the look of the invaders and their technology (their war machines bearing no clear dissimilarities), there is no seeming intended continuation. These invaders, depicted only in production art, only differ in certain detail as they appear leaner and their cyclopean eye sporting apparently only a single color. The most notable difference is that these aliens are not stated to be Martians. In part of the series' set-up, humanity sends ships to pursue the defeated invaders. Instead of chasing them to Mars, they are tracked down to the distant Alpha Centauri. It is then revealed that these aliens are not even the main villains, but rather an underling race to a greater force that is not revealed in the presentation.

The actual War of the Worlds TV series that was made, a sequel to the 1953 film, goes into more detail with its invaders. When the show begins, there is no mention of Mars (with the exception of one episode in which characters are confusing them with the Martians of the radio broadcast). Though some minor details are given away to indicate that their home planet was not Mars, it is not confirmed on-screen until midway through the season that they originate from a world named Mor-Tax. With their beautiful planet becoming uninhabitable from a dying star, they invade Earth with plans to take it over to preserve the traits that it shares with their old world. Their society is highly collective with the only sense of division in the form of their ternary caste system: a high-ranking and seemingly infallible ruling class (itself divided between the supreme leadership of a Council and their Advocacy to the lower classes), a military force in the middle, and scientists relegated to the bottom. They have the ability to "possess" human bodies through a process of cell-phase matching, which allows them to carry out their guerrilla war with Humanity undetected. They are incredibly intelligent, able to communicate in seconds over light-years of space, create effective booby traps, and even adapt seemingly normal human objects for their own purposes. However, their intelligence lends itself to their one true weakness: their hubris, as it is established that they often claim victory before it is accomplished, do not admit to their mistakes, and with the exception of the Advocacy, those who fail are executed.

== Video games ==
The octopus-like aliens of the 1978 game Space Invaders were inspired by Wells' Martians, as game designer Tomohiro Nishikado was a fan of the novel.

The Mars People from the game Metal Slug are inspired by the designs of the Martians.

== Names ==
Wells never gave the Martians a specific name.

One of the earliest names of the race was the Mor-Taxians, from the 1980s TV show. In Larry Niven's Rainbow Mars they are called "Softfingers", and in The League of Extraordinary Gentlemen, Volume II, the native Martians of the Barsoom books refer to them as "molluscs", "mollusc invaders", or "leeches", while Hawley Griffin contemptuously refers to them as "afterbirths".

George Alec Effinger's "Mars: The Home Front" in the shared world anthology War of the Worlds: Global Dispatches, has Edgar Rice Burroughs' inhabitants of Barsoom, Burroughs' vision of Mars, refer to Wells' Martians as "sarmaks", which name has become somewhat popular and appears in the Wold Newton universe and in articles in ERBZine, the official Burroughs fanzine.

In Ian McDonald's short story "The Queen of Night's Aria", a sequel to The War of the Worlds published in the 2013 George R. R. Martin and Gardner Dozois anthology Old Mars, the Wells Martians are named the Uliri.

== Bibliography ==
- Gosling, John. Waging the War of the Worlds. Jefferson, North Carolina, McFarland, 2009 (paperback, ISBN 0786441054).
