= The War of the Worlds (1953 film) =

1953 film by Byron Haskin

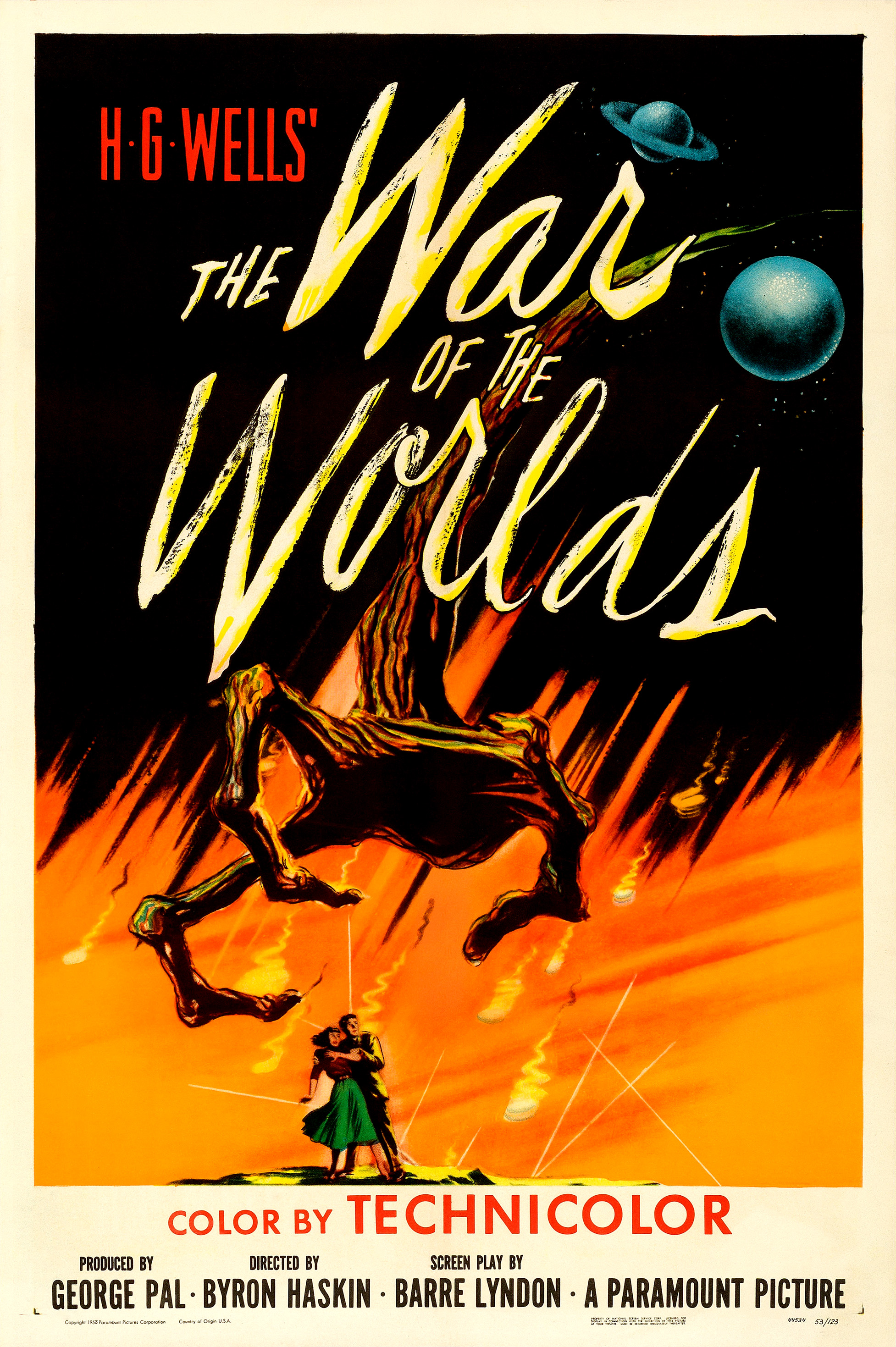
- Theatrical release poster
- Directed by: Byron Haskin
- Screenplay by: Barré Lyndon
- Based on: The War of the Worlds; 1898 novel by H. G. Wells
- Produced by: George Pal
- Starring: Gene Barry; Ann Robinson
- Cinematography: George Barnes
- Edited by: Everett Douglas
- Music by: Leith Stevens
- Distributed by: Paramount Pictures
- Release dates: April 3, 1953 (London); August 13, 1953 (New York); August 26, 1953 (United States)
- Running time: 85 minutes
- Country: United States
- Language: English
- Budget: $2 million
- Box office: $2 million (US rentals)

The War of the Worlds (also known in promotional material as H. G. Wells' The War of the Worlds) is a 1953 American science fiction thriller film directed by Byron Haskin, produced by George Pal and starring Gene Barry and Ann Robinson. The first film adaptation of H. G. Wells' 1898 novel of the same name in which Earth is invaded by Martians, the setting is changed from Victorian era England to 1950s Southern California. The first of two adaptations of Wells' classic science fiction filmed by Pal, The War of the Worlds won the Academy Award for Best Visual Effects and went on to influence other science fiction films. It is considered one of the great science fiction films of the 1950s. In 2011, it was selected for preservation in the National Film Registry by the United States Library of Congress, who deemed it "culturally, historically, or aesthetically significant".

== Plot ==
A narrated prologue shows the weapons of modern warfare from World War I and World War II, then warns of the upcoming "War of the Worlds" fought with "the terrible weapons of super-science menacing all mankind and every creature on Earth". It is explained that the Martians decided to invade Earth because their own planet Mars was dying and after determining that the other planets in the Solar System were unsuitable as a new home.

A large meteor impacts near the small town of Linda Rosa, California, on a summer evening. Local residents come to see the object, still glowing hot. Vacationing nuclear physicist Dr. Clayton Forrester suspects it may be hollow because the crater is so shallow, and determines it is radioactive. He meets Sylvia Van Buren and her uncle, Pastor Collins. Together, they attend an evening square dance. Back at the crash site, a hatch on the object unscrews and falls away. An electronic eye on a flexible neck emerges. As three men standing guard attempt to make contact with the occupants by waving a white flag, a heat-ray blast from the device incinerates them. A resulting fire causes a sudden power outage, while a strong magnetic field disables phones and mechanical watches, and makes a compass point to the impact. Forrester and the local sheriff arrive at the gully to find the ashes of the three men and survive the heat-ray attack from the same device. They see another meteor landing elsewhere. The Marines deploy near the gully to confront the Martians as reports pour in of more cylinders landing all over Earth and attacking. Three Martian machines emerge from the gully, moving on magnetic beams. Pastor Collins approaches alone on foot to attempt peaceful communication, holding a bible, but is incinerated by a heat-ray. The military opens fire with artillery, but is unable to penetrate the invaders' force field. The aliens counterattack with death ray weaponry, killing troops and destroying their weapons and vehicles. The surviving forces retreat. Air Force jets attack, but are annihilated.

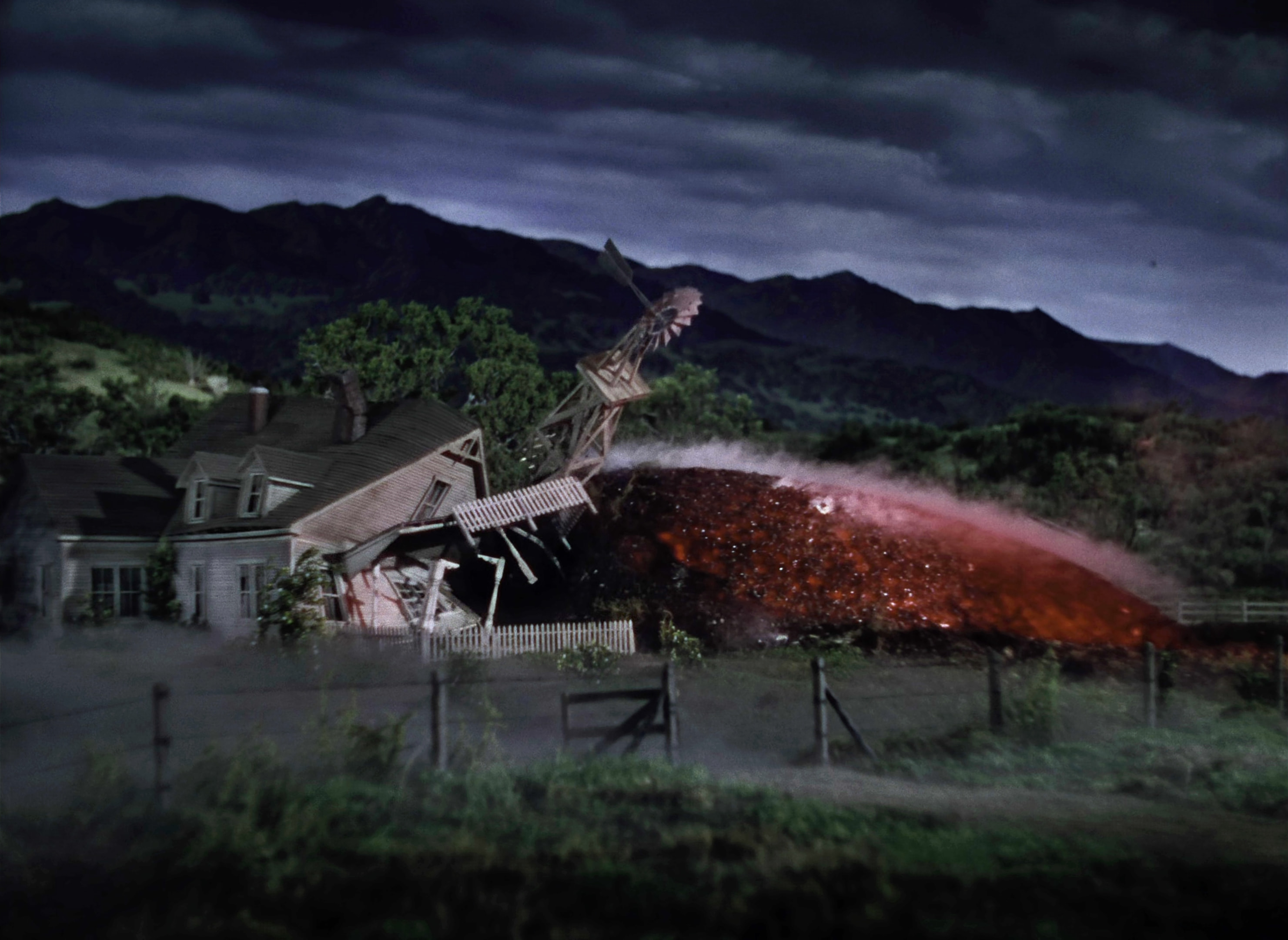
A Martian cylinder crashes into the farmhouse where Dr. Forrester and Sylvia Van Buren have taken refuge.

Forrester and Sylvia escape in a small plane and crash land. Hiding in an abandoned farmhouse, they are nearly killed by yet another crashing cylinder. As several others land together, one of the Martian craft extends a long cable with an electronic eye probe to explore the house, but Forrester severs it with an axe. A Martian creature enters and surprises Sylvia but retreats with a piercing scream when Forrester throws the axe at it; some of its blood lands on Sylvia's scarf. The pair escape just before the farmhouse is destroyed. Forrester takes the electronic eye and blood sample to a team of scientists at a Los Angeles university. It is discovered that the blood is extremely anemic. Dr. Duprey observes, "They may be mental giants, but, by our standards, physically, they must be very primitive."

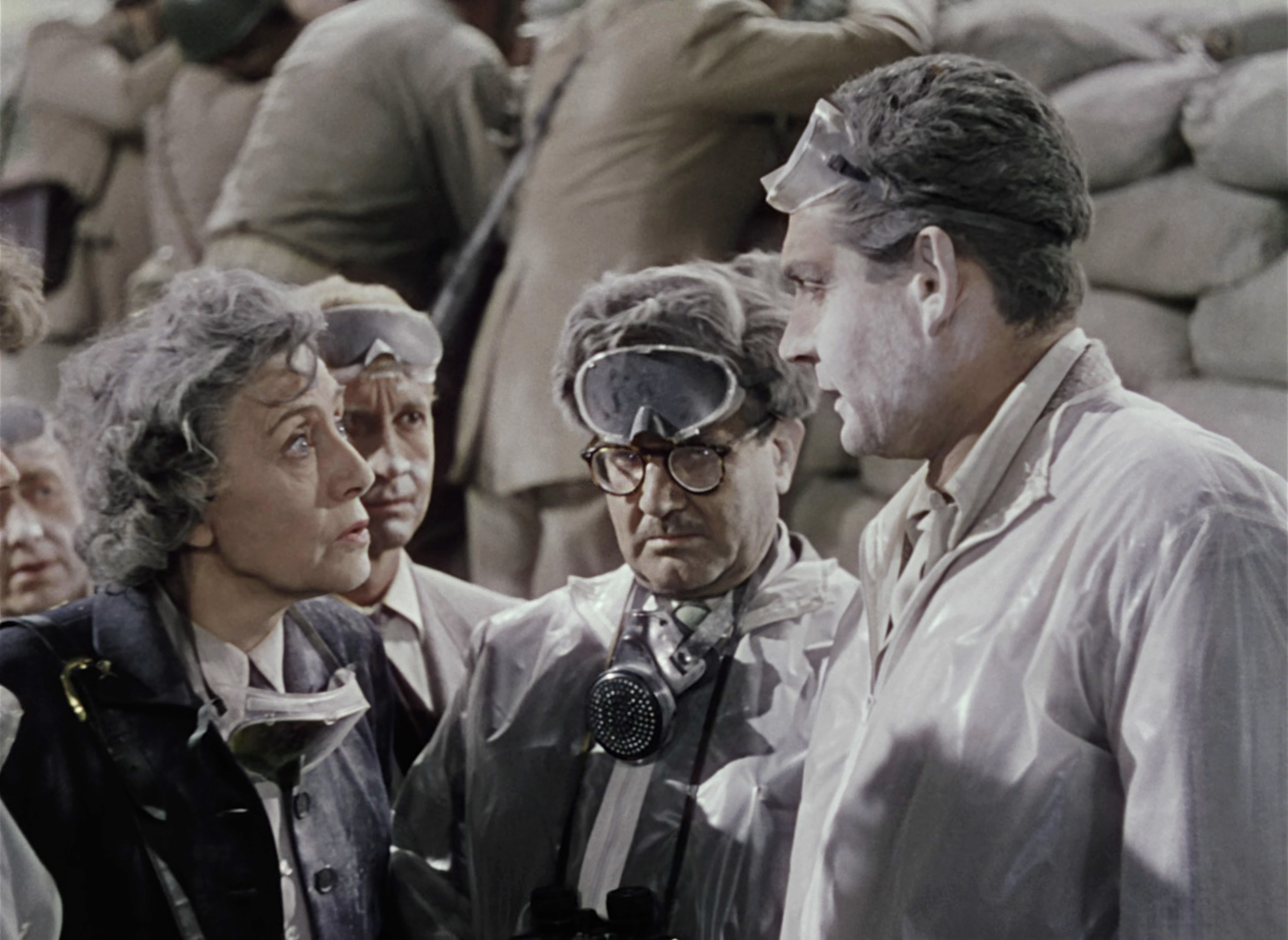
Dr. Forrester discusses with fellow scientists ways to defeat the Martians after a powerful atomic bomb blast fails to penetrate the Martians' electromagnetic "umbrella".

Meanwhile, as the world's capitals fall to the invaders, the U.S. government authorizes use of the atom bomb. A flying wing jet drops the bomb directly on a cluster of war machines gathered outside Los Angeles. However, the force field protects the Martians. With experts predicting total world domination in just six days, the scientists realize that the Martian machines cannot be destroyed but speculate that the Martians themselves may have a biological weakness. They plan to flee Los Angeles in buses and trucks with their laboratory equipment and samples to continue their research. During the city's evacuation, Forrester, Sylvia, and the other scientists become separated after a mob attacks and steals their vehicles.

Stranded in Los Angeles as the Martians begin their attack on the city, Forrester searches for Sylvia. Based on a story she told him earlier, he guesses she has taken refuge in a church. After searching through several, he finds Sylvia among many praying inside. Just as the invaders attack near the church, their machines unexpectedly crash. As Forrester sees a Martian try to exit, before dying, he reflects, "We were all praying for a miracle." The narrator explains that "the Martians had no resistance to the bacteria in our atmosphere to which we have long since become immune. . . After all that men could do had failed, the Martians were destroyed by the littlest things which God in His wisdom had put upon this earth."

== Cast ==
- Gene Barry as Dr. Clayton Forrester
- Ann Robinson as Sylvia Van Buren
- Les Tremayne as Major General Mann
- Bob Cornthwaite as Dr. Pryor
- Sandro Giglio as Dr. Bilderbeck
- Ann Codee as Dr. Duprey
- Lewis Martin as the Reverend Dr. Matthew Collins
- Housely Stevenson Jr. as General Mann's aide
- Bill Phipps as Wash Perry
- Vernon Rich as Colonel Ralph Heffner
- Henry Brandon as Cop at crash
- Jack Kruschen as Salvatore
- Paul Birch as Alonzo Hogue
- Walter Sande as Sheriff Bogany
- Paul Frees as Radio reporter/pre-titles narrator
- Sir Cedric Hardwicke as post-titles narrator

== Production ==
Paramount Pictures first attempted to adapt The War of the Worlds when the studio bought the film rights to the novel in 1925. Ray Pomeroy began working on an outline with Cecil B. DeMille planned as director, but the project was put into turn-around. Later in the 1930s, Paramount assigned Sergei Eisenstein to direct an adaptation of the novel under his contract with the studio but failed to produce a film. Alfred Hitchcock also entered discussions about adapting the novel with Wells and Gaumont-British may have optioned the rights, but the project did not go forward. Alexander Korda also expressed interest in adapting the novel.

The film finally began moving forward after George Pal was assigned to the project in July 1951. Pal originally envisioned a film more faithful to the source material in which a scientist would search for his wife after the invasion destroyed society, but Paramount Pictures production head Don Hartman demanded changes including a romantic subplot in which the scientist would meet and fall in love with a woman. For budgetary reasons, the setting was changed to 1950s America. Lyndon originally created a pilot-turned-oil prospector as the hero. Pal wanted a scientist.

Pal had planned for the final third of the film to be shot in the new 3D process to visually enhance the Martians' attack on Los Angeles. The plan was dropped before production began. World War II stock footage was used to produce a montage of destruction to show the worldwide invasion, with armies of all nations joining to fight the invaders.

The American composer Leith Stevens was chosen to score The War of the Worlds. He had written the orchestral music for George Pal's previous science fiction films Destination Moon in 1950 and When Worlds Collide in 1951, and had been a devoted reader of pulp science fiction back during his musical studies. In the case of The War of the Worlds, his music would convey the sinister nature of the Martians, along with the fear and intense emotions of the humans in the face of a ruthless alien enemy bent on mass destruction, using different orchestral effects. Stevens's score was praised by early reviewers, who noted that it "heightens the frightening mood" and made the film "a genuine emotional experience." Although the different sound effects associated with the Martian machines and weapons were created with electronic manipulation of electric guitars and tape recorders, Stevens only used two electronic instruments in his orchestral score, a Novachord and a vibraphone.

Dr. Forrester's and the other scientists' Pacific Tech (Pacific Institute of Science and Technology, represented by buildings on the Paramount studio lot) has since been part of other films and television episodes when it was decided to include a scientific California university without using the name of a real one.

Location shooting took place in Corona, California, which stood in for the fictitious town of Linda Rosa. St. Brendan's Catholic Church, at 310 South Van Ness Avenue in Los Angeles, was the setting for the climactic scene in which a large group of desperate people gather to pray. The rolling hills and main thoroughfares of El Sereno, Los Angeles, were also used in the film.

On the commentary track of the 2005 Special Collector's DVD Edition of War of the Worlds, Robinson and Barry say that the cartoon character Woody Woodpecker is in a treetop, center screen, when the first large Martian meteorite-ship crashes through the sky, at the beginning of the film. George Pal and Woody's creator, Walter Lantz, were close friends. Pal tried always to include Woody out of friendship and for good luck in his productions. Joe Adamson wrote years later: "Walter had been close friends with Pal ever since Pal had left Europe in advance of the war and arrived in Hollywood".

The prototype Northrop YB-49 Flying Wing is prominently featured in the atomic-bombing sequence. Pal and Haskin incorporated Northrop color footage of a YB-49 test flight, originally used in Paramount's Popular Science theatrical shorts, to show the Flying Wing's takeoff and bomb run.

Matching the opening narration, partly animated color paintings by artist Chesley Bonestell depict Mars and a Martian city with canals, and then views of Pluto, Neptune, Uranus, Saturn, Jupiter, and Mercury, ending with Earth as seen from space.

=== Differences from the Wells novel ===
Caroline Blake has written that the film is very different from the original novel in its attitude toward religion, as reflected especially in the depiction of clergymen. "The staunchly secularist Wells depicted a cowardly and thoroughly uninspiring Curate, whom the narrator regards with disgust, with which the reader is invited to concur. In the film, there is instead the sympathetic and heroic Pastor Collins who dies a martyr's death, and the film's final scene in the church, strongly emphasizing the Divine nature of Humanity's deliverance, has no parallel in the original book."

Pal's adaptation has many other differences from H. G. Wells's novel. The closest resemblance is probably that of the antagonists. The Martians invade Earth for the same reasons as those stated in the novel. The state of Mars suggests that it is becoming unable to support life, leading to the Martians' decision to try to make Earth their new home. They land in the same way, by crashing to Earth. The novel's spacecraft, however, are large, cylindrical projectiles fired from the Martian surface from a cannon, instead of the film's meteorite-spaceships; but the Martians emerge from their craft in the same way, by unscrewing a large, round hatch. In the novel, the invaders are observed "feeding" on humans by fatally transfusing their captives' blood supply directly into Martian bodies through pipettes. There is later speculation about the Martians' eventually using trained human slaves to hunt down all remaining survivors after they conquer Earth. Early storyline hints at the aliens' vampirism were dropped. The Martians do not bring their fast-growing red weed with them, but they are defeated by Earth microorganisms, as in the novel.

The film's Martians bear no physical resemblance to those of the novel, who are described as bear-sized, roundish creatures with grayish-brown bodies, "merely heads", with quivering beak-like, V-shaped mouths dripping saliva. They have sixteen whip-like tentacles in two groupings of eight arranged on each side of their mouths and two large "luminous, disk-like eyes". Because of budget constraints, their film counterparts are short, reddish-brown creatures with two long, thin arms with three long, thin fingers with suction-cup tips. The Martian head is a broad "face" at the top-front of its broad-shouldered upper torso, with one large central eye with three distinctly colored lenses of red, blue, and green. A greatly enlarged brain projects behind the top of the body, glimpsed as a screaming Martian flees the wrecked farmhouse after being injured by Forrester. The Martians' lower extremities are never shown. Some speculative designs suggest three thin legs resembling their fingers, and others show them as bipeds with short, stubby legs with three-toed feet.

The film's Martian war machines are more like those of the book than they first seem. The novel's war machines are 10-story-tall fast-moving tripods made of glittering metal, each with a "brazen hood" atop the body, moving "to and fro" as the machine moves. A heat-ray projector on an articulated arm is connected to the front of each machine's main body. However, the film's war machines are shaped like manta rays, with a bulbous, elongated green window at the front, through which the Martians observe their surroundings. On top of the machine is the cobra-like head heat-ray attached to a long, narrow, goose-neck extension, which can fire in any direction. They can be mistaken for flying machines, but Forrester states that they are lifted by magnetic rays that act as "invisible legs." One scene when the first war machine emerges has faint traces of three "energy legs" beneath that leave three sparking traces where they touch the burning ground, so they are tripods, though they are never so called. Whereas the novel's machines have no protection against the British army and navy cannon fire, the film's war machines have a force field surrounding them, described by Forrester as a "protective blister".

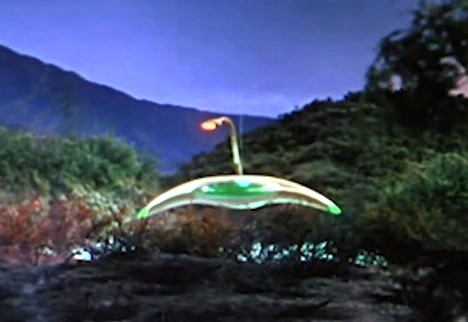
A manta-like Martian fighting machine hovers on invisible magnetic legs, armed with a cobra-like heat ray and a pair of "skeleton beams" on the sides

The Martian weaponry is also partially unchanged. The heat-ray has the very same effect as that of the novel. However, the novel's heat-ray mechanism is briefly described as just a rounded hump when its silhouette rises above the landing crater's rim; it fires an invisible energy beam in a wide arc while still in the pit made by the first Martian cylinder after it crash-lands. The film's first heat-ray scene has a projector shaped like a cobra head with a single, red pulsing light, which likely acts as a targeting telescope for the Martians inside their war machine shaped like a manta ray. The novel describes another weapon, the "black smoke" used to kill all life; the war machines fire canisters containing a black smoke-powder through a bazooka-like tube accessory. When dispersed, this black powder is lethal to all life forms who breathe it. This weapon is replaced in the film by a Martian "skeleton beam" of green pulsing energy bursts fired from the wingtips of the manta-ray machines; these bursts break apart the sub-atomic bonds that hold matter together. These beams are used off-screen to obliterate several French cities.

The plot of the film is very different from the novel, which tells the story of a 19th-century writer (with additional narration in later chapters by his medical-student younger brother) who journeys through Victorian London and its southwestern suburbs while the Martians attack, eventually being reunited with his wife; the film's protagonist is a Californian scientist who falls in love with a former college student after the Martian invasion begins. However, certain points of the film's plot are similar to the novel, from the crash-landing of the Martian meteorite-ships to their eventual defeat by Earth's microorganisms. Forrester also experiences similar events to the book's narrator, with an ordeal in a destroyed house, observing an actual Martian up close, and eventually reuniting with Sylvia at the end of the story. The film has more of a Cold War theme with the atomic bomb against the invading enemy and the mass destruction that such a global war would inflict on humanity.

=== Special effects ===
As recounted in an article for Astounding Science Fiction in 1953, producer George Pal realized that much of the box-office and critical success of his motion picture would depend on the quality of the special effects. Half the scenes in the final film involved some sort of special effects. A particular challenge was the creation of believable, highly realistic scale-model miniatures of Los Angeles neighborhoods and the City Hall, which is destroyed by the Martians. Pal noted with sadness that Paramount Pictures Special-Effects Director Gordon Jennings, who had worked on The War of the Worlds, died of a heart attack before the film premiered for the public. An estimated $1.4 million worth of the film's $2 million budget was spent on the many special effects needed. The War of the Worlds would win the Best Visual Effects Oscar at the 1954 Academy Awards.

An effort was made to avoid the stereotypical flying saucer look of UFOs. The Martian war machines were designed by Albert Nozaki with a sinister manta ray shape floating above the ground. Three Martian war machine props were made of copper and reportedly were later melted for a scrap copper recycling drive. The same blueprints were used a decade later (without neck and cobra head) to construct the alien spacecraft in the film Robinson Crusoe on Mars, also directed by Byron Haskin.

Each Martian machine is topped with an articulated metal neck and arm, culminating in the cobra head heat ray projector, housing a single electronic eye that operates both as a periscope and as a weapon. The electronic eye houses a heat ray, which pulses and fires red sparking beams, all accompanied by thrumming and a high-pitched clattering shriek when the ray was used. As explained by Rubin (page 42) in 1977: "[T]he sinister power surge and resulting enfilade, was an effect achieved entirely by electric guitars." The sound engineers "would record the high-pitched electronic screeching and edit it down, playing it backwards as well, adjusting the volume and tone until they found the proper effect." Composer Stevens had created a score of the scene in which the three men monitoring the space object are attacked by the heat ray, but this music was replaced by the manipulated electric guitar sounds in the final film (Rosar page 418). Live burning welding wire simulated the fiery blast of the heat ray, with a blower forcing the resulting sparks toward the camera. The optical effect was then matted into the scenes where the Martians deploy the weapon on humans and buildings (Rubin page 34).

The machines also fire a pulsing green ray (referred to in dialog as "a skeleton beam") from their wingtips, disintegrating their targets—the disintegration effect for Marine Colonel Heffner that reveals his skeleton took 144 separate matte paintings to create (Rubin page 42). (This second weapon is a replacement for the deadly chemical weapon black smoke described in Wells's novel.) As reported by Rubin 1977, the distinctive pulsing sound of the "skeleton beam" was created with "a carefully created panel of sound apparatus" that allowed the engineers to perfect "the spine tingling 'ping, ping, ping' of the heat ray generator as it prepares to fire, the steady 'thump, thump' of the skeleton ray, the searching sound of the electronic eye, and the electronic whine of the crashing war machines." Some of these sound effects, preserved in the Paramount Pictures sound library, were reportedly reused in Star Trek: The Original Series television program, including the "skeleton beam" pulse for the launch of the photon torpedoes. The sound when the Martian ships begin to move reportedly was also reused by Star Trek as the sound of an overloading hand phaser.

When the large Marine force opens fire on the Martians with everything in its heavy arsenal, each Martian machine is protected by an impenetrable force field that resembles, when briefly visible between explosions, the clear jar placed over a mantle clock, or a bell jar with a cylindrical shape and a hemispherical top. This effect was accomplished with simple matte paintings on clear glass, which were then photographed and combined with other effects, and optically printed together during post-production. While conventional Earth weapons cannot penetrate the electromagnetic shields, the Martian death ray weapons can fire through the shields against their targets without trouble. Grouped Martian fighting machines later use their combined electromagnetic shielding (seen from a distance in animation) against the atomic bomb dropped by the flying wing. The atomic mushroom cloud was created on a Paramount sound stage by explosives expert Walter Hoffman using colored powder launched upward by a canister of exploding gas. The effect was filmed at high speed for a slow-motion bigger size illusion at normal frame speed as the powder cloud rose 75 feet to form a mushroom top like the real thing (Rubin page 40).

The Martian's scream in the farmhouse ruins was created by mixing the sound of a microphone scraping along dry ice into a woman's recorded scream that had been reversed and speeded up. The microphone on dry ice sound was also added into the blast noise of the heat ray along with the sound of three electric guitars recorded backwards. Another prominent sound effect in the film is a chattering, synthesized echo, perhaps representing some kind of Martian sonar sounds like hissing electronic rattlesnakes, again created electronically.

There were many problems trying to create the walking tripods of Wells's novel. It was eventually decided to make the Martian machines appear to float in the air on three invisible legs. To visualize them, subtle special effects of downward lights were to be added directly under the moving war machines; however, in the final film, these only appear when one of the first machines can be seen rising from the Martian's landing site. It proved too difficult and dangerous to mark out the invisible legs while smoke and other effects must remain visible beneath the machines, and the effect also created a major fire hazard. In all of the subsequent scenes, however, the three invisible leg beams create small, sparking fires where they touch the ground.

=== Quality of special effects ===
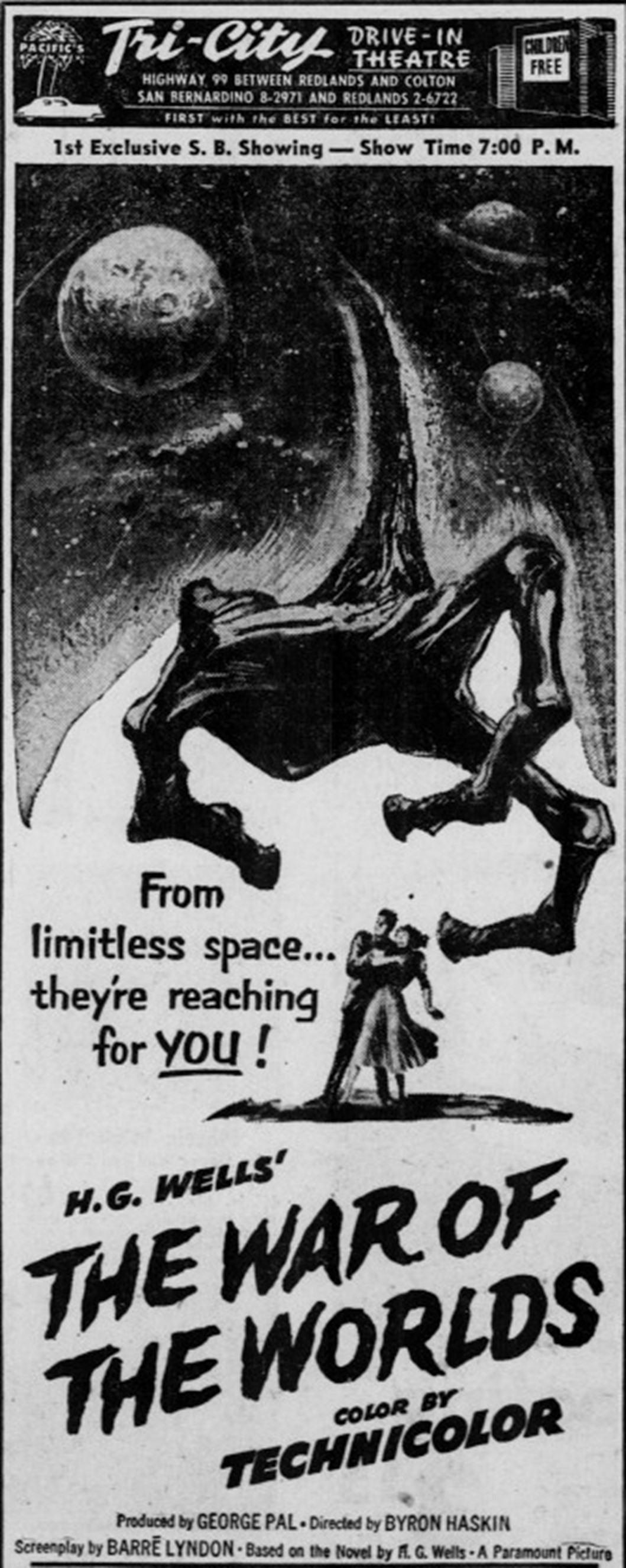
Drive-in advertisement from 1953.

Theatrical re-release poster

For 50 years, from the late 1960s when The War of the Worlds 3-strip Technicolor prints were replaced by the easier-to-use and less expensive Eastman Color stock, the quality of the film's special effects suffered dramatically. This degraded the lighting, timing, and image resolution, causing the original invisible overhead wires suspending the Martian war machines to become increasingly visible with each succeeding film and video format change. This led many, including respected critics, to mistakenly believe the effects were originally of low quality.

== Reception ==
=== Release ===
The official Hollywood premiere of The War of the Worlds was on February 20, 1953, although it did not go into general theatrical release until late that year. The film was both a critical and box-office success. The film accrued $2,000,000 in distributors' domestic (U.S. and Canada) rentals, making the film the year's biggest science fiction hit. ("Rentals" refers to the distributor and studio's share of the box-office gross, which, according to Gebert, is roughly half of the money generated by ticket sales.)

On its 1953 release, The War of the Worlds was rated X by the British Board of Film Classification (BBFC) for its alarming and "horrific" content, meaning no one under 16 could see the film. This was unsuccessfully protested by several local authorities, believing the rating should be lower. In 1961, Paramount Pictures sought to have the film's certificate reduced to A, meaning persons under 16 could view the film if accompanied by an adult, but this was rejected. The film was reclassified A in 1981, now meaning that the film may be unsuitable to under 14s. For its 1986 VHS release, The War of the Worlds was re-rated PG (meaning all audiences can see it but some scenes may be unsuitable for young children). It is an unusual example of a film that was once rated X but now stands as a PG.

=== Critical response ===
In The New York Times, A. H. Weiler's review commented: "[The film is] an imaginatively conceived, professionally turned adventure, which makes excellent use of Technicolor, special effects by a crew of experts, and impressively drawn backgrounds ... Director Byron Haskin, working from a tight script by Barré Lyndon, has made this excursion suspenseful, fast and, on occasion, properly chilling". William Brogdon in Variety said, "[It is] a socko science-fiction feature, as fearsome as a film as was the Orson Welles 1938 radio interpretation ... what starring honors there are go strictly to the special effects, which create an atmosphere of soul-chilling apprehension so effectively [that] audiences will actually take alarm at the danger posed in the picture. It can't be recommended for the weak-hearted, but to the many who delight in an occasional good scare, it's socko entertainment of hackle-raising quality". The Monthly Film Bulletin of the UK called it "the best of the postwar American science-fiction films; the Martian machines have a quality of real terror, their sinister apparitions, prowlings and pulverisings are spectacularly well done, and the scenes of panic and destruction are staged with real flair". Richard L. Coe of The Washington Post called it "to put it gently, terrific", and "for my money, the King Kong of its day".

The War of the Worlds won a Special Achievement Award in 1954 from the Academy for its Visual Effects, as there was no competitive category that year. Everett Douglas was nominated for Film Editing, and the Paramount Studio Sound Department and Loren L. Ryder were nominated for Sound Recording. The War of the Worlds also received the Motion Picture Sound Editors first annual award in 1954 for "the most dramatic use of sound effects in 1953". At the time, the Motion Picture Academy did not have an award category specifically for sound effects.

In 2004, The War of the Worlds was presented with a Retrospective Hugo Award for 1954 in the category of Best Dramatic Presentation — Short Form (works running 90 minutes or less).

Film historian and critic Leonard Maltin described the film as "... vivid, frightening."

The War of the Worlds still receives high acclaim from some critics. On the film review aggregator website Rotten Tomatoes, it has an 89% rating based on 47 critics, with an average rating of 7.20/10. The consensus states: "Though it's dated in spots, The War of the Worlds retains an unnerving power, updating H. G. Wells's classic sci-fi tale to the Cold War era and featuring some of the best special effects of any 1950s film".

While the film's reputation rests solidly on its impressive and memorable special effects, critical opinion regarding the romance between Forrester and Sylvia and the two actors' performances has been less favorable. TV Guide Magazine gave it a 75 score: "Though it's bogged down by a stiff cast, a yawn-inspiring conventional romance, and a sappy religiosity, it remains a landmark in the history of special effects".

George Pal noted the plot modification in adapting and updating the original story: "Now how [H. G. Wells] would have taken our addition of a romantic interest I won't hazard a guess. But in the film business you have to be practical. No one is less interested in doing routine boy meets girl stories than I. But a boy-and-girl theme is necessary even in a science-fiction film of the scope of War Of The Worlds. Audiences want it". Screenwriter Barré Lyndon objected to Paramount's insistence on a romantic element: "And they forced on me this ridiculous story of a scientist going on a fishing trip, meeting a girl and then after only one evening, he begins this tremendous search, from church to church".

Science fiction film scholar Bill Warren was less critical of the romantic plot, noting that, quite unusual for a 1950s science fiction film, the main character Clayton Forrester has a character arc. He begins as a rather smug, self-absorbed academic, initially thrilled by the Martian technology, even exclaiming, "This is amazing!" on first seeing the magnetically suspended fighting machines. As the assault on mankind escalates and he shares personal perils with Sylvia, he transforms into a more humanized, caring individual who later braves the dangers of the Martian attack on Los Angeles to track down the person who now matters most to him.

== 4K restoration ==
In 2018, a new, fully restored 4K Dolby Vision transfer from the original three-strip Technicolor negatives was published on iTunes. In July 2020, the 4K restoration was released on Blu-ray and DVD via The Criterion Collection in the United States. The transfer process and careful color and contrast calibrations allowed the special effects to be restored to Technicolor release print quality, without the war machine's supporting wires. The film was released on 4K UHD Blu-ray in September 2023 via Paramount Presents, bundled with the 1951 film When Worlds Collide (also produced by George Pal). A year later, the film was given its own separate 4K UHD Blu-ray release for its 70th anniversary via Paramount Pictures.

== Legacy ==
The War of the Worlds was deemed culturally, historically, or aesthetically significant in 2011 by the United States Library of Congress for preservation in the National Film Registry. The Registry noted the film's release during the early years of the Cold War and how it used "the apocalyptic paranoia of the atomic age". The Registry also cited the special effects, which at its release were called "soul-chilling, hackle-raising, and not for the faint of heart".

The Martians were ranked the 27th best villains in the American Film Institute's list AFI's 100 Years...100 Heroes and Villains.

The 1988 War of the Worlds TV series serves as a sequel to the original film. The series retcon that rather than being killed outright by germs at the end of the film, the aliens had all slipped into a state of suspended animation, and they are not Martians but are actually from Mor-Tax—a garden planet 40 light-years away in the Taurus constellation orbiting a dying sun. Ann Robinson reprises her role as Sylvia Van Buren in three episodes. Robinson also reprises her role in two other films, first as Dr. Van Buren in 1988's Midnight Movie Massacre and then as Dr. Sylvia Van Buren in 2005's The Naked Monster.

Warning from Space (1956), the first colored tokusatsu film in Japan, bears similarities in its plot to The War of the Worlds.

The 1996 film Independence Day has several allusions to Pal's 1953 War of the Worlds. The failed attempt of a dropped atomic bomb is replaced with a nuclear-armed cruise missile launched by a B-2 Spirit bomber (a direct descendant of the Northrop YB-49 bomber in the 1953 film) and Captain Hiller being based in El Toro, California, which Dr. Forrester mentions as the home of the Marines, which make the first assault on the invading Martians in Pal's film.

The Asylum's 2005 direct-to-DVD H. G. Wells' War of the Worlds has mild references to the Pal version. The Martian's mouth has three tongues that closely resemble the three Martian fingers in the Pal film. The Asylum film has scenes of power outages after the aliens' arrival via meteorite-ships. As in the Pal film, refugees hide in the mountains, instead of hiding underground as in the Wells novel, and the protagonist actively tries to fight the aliens by biological means.

Steven Spielberg's 2005 version, War of the Worlds, although an adaptation of the Wells novel, has several references to the 1953 film. Gene Barry and Ann Robinson have cameo appearances near the end, and the invading aliens have three-fingered hands but are reptilian, walking tripods. A long, snaking, alien camera probe is deployed by the invaders. In his 2018 film Ready Player One, Spielberg included a fallen Martian war machine more akin to the 1953 film.

Tomohiro Nishikado, creator of the breakthrough 1978 video game Space Invaders, stated that seeing the film in childhood was one of the inspirations for the inclusion and the design of the aliens in the game.

Mystery Science Theater 3000 named one of its lead characters, the mad scientist Dr. Clayton Forrester, as an homage to the 1953 film.

== See also ==
- List of works based on The War of the Worlds
