= The Martian War =

2005 novel by Kevin J. Anderson

First edition (publ. Pocket Books)

The Martian War: A Thrilling Eyewitness Account of the Recent Invasion as Reported by Mr. H.G. Wells is a 2005 science fiction novel by American writer Kevin J. Anderson, published under his pseudonym Gabriel Mesta. It is a retelling of H. G. Wells' 1898 novel The War of the Worlds similar to Anderson's past work War of the Worlds: Global Dispatches. It recounts the Martian invasion from a variety of viewpoints, and has ties to Wells' other work.

In The Martian War, Wells himself is the main character who witnesses the Martian attack alongside his fiancée Jane, Thomas Huxley, and Percival Lowell. The British government brings them together with Dr. Moreau and Hawley Griffin, who help develop a strain of cholera to be used against the Martians. Wells travels to the Moon to free the Selenites, who have been enslaved by the Martians, who join forces to end the Martian menace once and for all.

The premise is similar to the earlier The League of Extraordinary Gentlemen, Volume II as both involve a group of literary figures being brought together by a secret agency of the British government to fight the Martians. Both books end the invasion by using a biological weapon, and Griffin and Moreau are involved in both.

The Martian War uses the same first name given to the Invisible Man by the creators of the comic book The League of Extraordinary Gentlemen, Vol. II (in the original book, the Invisible Man had no first name. The comic book author Alan Moore gave him the first name 'Hawley' as a reference to Hawley Crippen). Anderson had previously written the novelization of the League of Extraordinary Gentlemen film.
