= Albert Nozaki =

Japanese American art director (1912–2003)

Albert Ryuichi Nozaki (Japanese: 農崎 隆一, 1 January 1912 – 16 November 2003) was a Japanese American art director who worked on various films for Paramount Pictures. He is perhaps best known for his memorable design of the Martian war machines from the 1953 film The War of the Worlds and for his Academy Award-nominated art direction on the 1956 Cecil B. DeMille epic, The Ten Commandments. He retired in 1969 due to retinitis pigmentosa, which ultimately cost him his sight. Starting out at Paramount as a draftsman in the Paramount set-design department in 1934, he retired in 1969 as the studio's supervising art director for feature films.

== Biography ==
Born in Japan, Nozaki's family moved to the United States when he was 3 and settled in Los Angeles. Nozaki earned a bachelor's degree in architecture from the University of Southern California in 1933 and a master's degree in architectural engineering from the University of Illinois in 1934.

In 1938, and for many years thereafter, Al Nozaki lived in Echo Park, California. Shortly after the Japanese attack on Pearl Harbor in 1941, Nozaki was abruptly dismissed from his job at Paramount. Following the signing of Executive Order 9066 in the spring of 1942, and the subsequent roundup of 120,000 West Coast residents of Japanese descent, he and his wife, Lorna, were sent to the Manzanar internment camp in California's Owens Valley.

Among his many other credits as an art director are When Worlds Collide, The Big Clock, Sorrowful Jones, Appointment with Danger, Pony Express, Houdini, The Buccaneer, and Loving You.

Nozaki died on November 16, 2003, in Los Angeles, California from complications of pneumonia.

== Documentaries ==
Albert Nozaki appeared in the documentary The Fantasy Film Worlds of George Pal (1985) (produced and directed by Arnold Leibovit).

Albert Nozaki appeared in the documentary ‘’Something’s Gonna Live’’ (2009) (produced and directed by Daniel Raim).
