= War of the Worlds: Global Dispatches =

1996 anthology edited by Kevin J. Anderson

- First edition Cover art by Roger Dean and Tim White
- Language: English
- Publisher: Bantam Spectra
- Publication date: 1996

War of the Worlds: Global Dispatches is a 1996 science fiction anthology, edited by Kevin J. Anderson and published by American company Bantam Spectra. It is a tribute to H. G. Wells' 1898 novel The War of the Worlds; each story envisions a famous individual's reactions to the Martian invasion and the impact of the invasion on a different part of the world.

Several of the stories tie into other works of fiction; Anderson would also later go on to write The Martian War, a novel that also presented Wells' Martian invasion from the viewpoints of Wells and several other fictional and historical characters.

== Reception ==
The book has been reviewed by:

- Gary K. Wolfe (1996) in Locus, #424 May 1996
- Stephen Baxter (1996) in Interzone, #109 July 1996
- Mark R. Kelly (1996) in Locus, #428 September 1996
- Moshe Feder (1996) in Asimov's Science Fiction, September 1996
- Don D'Ammassa (1996) in Science Fiction Chronicle, #190 October 1996
- Thomas A. Easton [as by Tom Easton] (1996) in Analog Science Fiction and Fact, October 1996
- Brian M. Thomsen [as by Brian Thomsen] (1996) in Dragon Magazine, November 1996
- Robert M. Price (1997) in Crypt of Cthulhu, Lammas 1997
- John Deakins (1997) in Absolute Magnitude, Spring 1997
- James Schellenberg (2000) in Challenging Destiny, April 2000

Polish science fiction editor and critic, Maciej Parowski, positively commented on the anthology in his 2011 book Małpy Pana Boga – Słowa, noting that it was a well executed difficult endeavour, difficult because the writers were limited by the theme (reactions of the famous individuals to the Martian invasion). He singled out stories by Tiedemann and Wolverton as particularly notable.

== Impact ==
Global Dispatches was one of the works consulted by Stephen Baxter for his own sequel to The War of the Worlds, The Massacre of Mankind.

== Table of contents ==
| Title | Persona | Author | Notes | Location invaded | Alternate history afterward |
|---|---|---|---|---|---|
| Forward | H. G. Wells | Kevin J. Anderson | - | - | |
| "The Roosevelt Dispatches" | Teddy Roosevelt | Mike Resnick | Also included in The Other Teddy Roosevelts; in this story, Martians are powerful and nearly invulnerable in their own bodies, even without a Fighting Machine | Cuba (only minor Martian presence) | |
| "Canals in the Sand" | Percival Lowell | Kevin J. Anderson | Lowell's Sahara project in this story is historically associated with Joseph Johann von Littrow. Was expanded to serve as the prologue of The Martian War | North Africa | |
| "Foreign Devils" | Guangxu Emperor and Empress Dowager Cixi | Walter Jon Williams | Won the 1996 Sidewise Award for Alternate History (Short Form); conflict in story is as much between various Chinese political and military factions as Humans vs. Martians | China | China uses disarray of European powers to shake off colonial tutlelage and become world power 50 years ahead of schedule, remains a monarchy under the reform-minded Guangxu Emperor; no Chinese Republic. |
| "Blue Period" | Pablo Picasso | Daniel Marcus | - | Paris, France | The young Picasso paints Martians, his later artistic style substantially influenced |
| "The Martian Invasion Journals of Henry James" | Henry James | Robert Silverberg | - | England (same invasion as in original Wells book, from a different viewpoint) | Henry James becomes author of "The War of the Worlds", later style and literary career substantially affected |
| "The True Tale of the Final Battle of Umslopogaas the Zulu" | Winston Churchill and H. Rider Haggard | Janet Berliner | Umslopogaas was the fictional companion of Allan Quatermain in Haggard's novels | South Africa during the Boer War (only minor Martian presence) | |
| "Night of the Cooters" | The Texas Rangers | Howard Waldrop | Texas is the only location on Earth where humans are shown succeeding in curtailing the Martian invasion, due especially to a plucky and highly resourceful middle-aged small town Sheriff. (Originally printed in Omni in 1987) | Texas | |
| "Determinism and the Martian War, with Relativistic Corrections" | Albert Einstein | Doug Beason | - | Italy | A young Einstein becomes trapped in a Martian war machine and notices that the exterior time runs quicker relative to him. |
| "Soldier of the Queen" | Rudyard Kipling and Mohandas K. Gandhi | Barbara Hambly | - | India | Gandhi makes India independent 50 years ahead of schedule, Kipling becomes resigned to the end of the British Empire |
| "Mars: The Home Front" | Edgar Rice Burroughs | George Alec Effinger | John Carter helps the Barsoomians fight Wells' Martians, who in this depiction are only one of many races on Mars | Barsoomian city of Helium (a raid only) | |
| "A Letter from St. Louis" | Joseph Pulitzer | Allen Steele | - | St. Louis (reference to the destruction of New York) | Pulitzer killed by Martians before having had a chance to endow the Pulitzer Prize |
| "Resurrection" | Leo Tolstoy and Joseph Stalin | Mark W. Tiedemann | - | Russia | After reconstruction from Martian ravages, in which Tolstoy has key role, Russia becomes a stable Constitutional Monarchy; no October Revolution, Stalin an obscure revolutionary; Tolstoy's final work, Resurrection, is never published |
| "Paris Conquers All" | Jules Verne | Gregory Benford and David Brin | In this story, Martians are divided into males and females, directly contradicting data in original Wells book but vital for plotline here | Paris, France (substantially different from Daniel Marcus' account for the same city) | |
| "To Mars and Providence" | H. P. Lovecraft | Don Webb | Equates the Martians with Lovecraft's Elder Things | Providence, Rhode Island (references landings in London, Paris, St. Louis, and Texas) | |
| "Roughing it During the Martian Invasion" | Mark Twain | Daniel Keys Moran and Jodi Moran | - | New Orleans (brief depiction of a naval battle off New York) | |
| "To See the World End" | Joseph Conrad | M. Shayne Bell | - | "Congo Free State" | The Martian invasion causes the people of the world to finally unite as one, and a central government, The Council of Earth, is created. |
| "After a Lean Winter" | Jack London | Dave Wolverton | The only story to give a brief glimpse of the Martians' own point of view (in this story, they are telepathic and can, if they want, communicate with humans) and it shows that they, too, think of themselves as The Good Guys | Alaska | Due apparently to cold weather, Martians persist in Alaska after dying in the rest of the world - the story gives no hint if and when they were finally gotten rid of. As a result, London remains stuck in Alaska among trappers grimly struggling to survive under the Martians, and no indication if and when he went back to California and took up his literary career. |
| "The Soul Selects her own Society: Invasion and Repulsion: A Chronological Reinterpretation of Two of Emily Dickinson's Poems: A Wellsian Perspective" | Emily Dickinson | Connie Willis | In the 1990s, a literature student's graduate thesis argues that Dickinson witnessed the invasion even though she died 11 years before it happened. Won the 1997 Hugo Award for Best Short Story, and reprinted in The War of the Worlds: Fresh Perspectives on the H. G. Wells Classic | Amherst, Massachusetts | |
| "Afterward: Retrospective" | Jules Verne | Gregory Benford and David Brin | Set in 1928, and recounts how the technology and lessons learned from the Martians have changed the world for the better, and how the humans are launching a counter-invasion of Mars | | |
