= Lieut. Gullivar Jones: His Vacation =

1905 novel by Edwin Lester Arnold

- Cover of first edition
- Author: Edwin Lester Arnold
- Language: English
- Genre: Fantasy novel, Science fiction novel
- Publisher: S.C. Brown, Langham & Co.
- Publication date: 1905
- Publication place: United Kingdom
- Media type: Print (hardback)
- Pages: 301

Lieut. Gullivar Jones: His Vacation is a novel by English writer Edwin Lester Arnold, combining elements of fantasy and science fiction, first published in 1905. Its mediocre reception led Arnold to stop writing fiction. It has since become his best-known work, and is considered important in the development of 20th century science fiction in that it is a precursor and possible inspiration to Edgar Rice Burroughs's classic A Princess of Mars (1917), which spawned the planetary romance aka 'sword and planet' genre. Ace Books reprinted Arnold's novel in paperback in 1964, retitling it Gulliver [sic] of Mars. A more recent Bison Books edition (2003) was issued as Gullivar of Mars, adapting the Ace title to Arnold's spelling.

== Plot ==
In an unspecified future year, Gullivar Jones is a discontented Navy lieutenant stationed in New York. He struggles with a stalled career, unpaid bills, and separation from a young woman named Polly, whom he believes he loves. One stormy night, while traversing a slum district on his way home, Jones witnesses an elderly man clad in antique garments plummet to his death from the sky, apparently ejected from what appears to be a large, intricately patterned magic carpet. Jones conveys the body to a hospital, inadvertently retaining both a crystal bead from the man and the ornate carpet, which he carries to his lodgings.

Later that evening, in a moment of frustration with his stagnant life, Jones half-seriously wishes to be transported anywhere, specifically to Mars. The carpet responds at once: it envelops him, carries him through the atmosphere at immense speed, and deposits him unconscious upon the Martian surface. Jones awakens surrounded by inhabitants of Mars, a world populated by the Hither people, a graceful, languid race devoted to aesthetic pleasures, marked by profound indolence, and devoid of ambition or conflict. A gentle, androgynous youth named An assists him, imparting knowledge of the Martian language through a hypnotic mind-to-mind transfer. Jones learns of the Hither society's structure: absence of traditional family bonds, annual mass marriages determined by lot, and reliance on yellow-robed slaves for all manual labor. The city of Seth, where he arrives, features beautiful though ruined architecture, flower-adorned booths, and canals, its inhabitants sustained in carefree leisure.

Jones meets Prince Hath, the nominal ruler, and rescues Hath's betrothed Princess Heru from drowning when a log strikes the royal barge. This deed secures him lodging in the palace. During a subsequent public ceremony, Heru, serving as priestess, performs a ritual dance to divine the year's fortunes using a crystal globe filled with water. As Earth appears prominently in the Martian sky, the globe turns crimson, evoking terror in Heru. When no one else acts, Jones intervenes, seizes the fainting princess, overturns the globe to dispel the ominous vision, and carries her to safety. Following the rite, Jones claims Heru as his bride by interpreting her subtle instruction to find a pearl tablet tied by a single hair in the urn of marriage lots. The celebration is disrupted, however, by envoys from the Thither-folk, a robust, warlike race from the western forests governed by King Ar-hap. They arrive to exact the annual tribute of provisions and demand the most beautiful woman present. Hath spitefully indicates Heru, and when an envoy seizes her, Jones attacks furiously, overpowering the envoy before collapsing from the effects of Martian wine.

Upon recovering, Jones discovers that the Thither raiders have departed with Heru. The apathetic Hither refuse to assist, compelling Jones to pursue alone. He desperately boards a raider vessel and fights valiantly, but is knocked unconscious and cast into the sea, clinging to floating silks that serve as a raft. Drifting through perilous waters, Jones encounters a giant swimming stag that tows him to shore. Stranded in swampy islands bordering a vast forest, he endures hunger, nocturnal terrors (including a savage battle between enormous rat-like creatures) and strange, animated flora: color-shifting plants, ambulatory vegetation, predatory birds devouring mobile blossoms, and carnivorous flowers. He reaches a fishing hamlet where inhabitants grow enormous gourds molded into seamless canoes. Welcomed and provisioned, he departs by sea toward Ar-hap's domain but is swept into the River of the Dead, a one-way waterway bearing corpses on floral rafts toward distant falls.

Navigating amid funeral flotillas, Jones escapes destruction at icy cataracts by leaping across frozen bodies to a ledge. On the shore below towering ice cliffs, he finds a vast necropolis of perfectly preserved corpses embedded in the walls across millennia. He acquires a jeweled iron circlet from an ancient king's remains and, after a nocturnal struggle with a thawed corpse mistaken for an attacker, descends the slope. A Thither woodman guides him from the valley in exchange for jewels. Traveling southward through warmer lands, Jones observes further bizarre flora before entering the ruined, haunted city of Queen Yang. There, guided by spectral flames, he retrieves another jeweled crown from the skeleton of the queen amid infant skulls. Continuing to a Thither port, he learns Heru is held in Ar-hap's capital. Securing passage upriver amid rising heat and an ominous red celestial body, he reaches the thatched capital, collapses in the palace gardens, and gains aid from an enslaved Hither woman named Si.

Ar-hap returns and, skeptical of Jones's claims of his supernatural origin, demands proof through two tasks: retrieving a circlet from the ice valley and a crown from Yang's tomb. Jones produces both artifacts, astonishing the court and securing Heru's temporary release. As catastrophic heat engulfs the region, causing fires and chaos, Jones escapes with Heru during the turmoil, eventually returning her to Seth. In Seth, Heru resumes her duties while Jones, unacknowledged, briefly indulges in local pleasures before seeking return. During a subsequent ritual, Ar-hap attacks again, sacking the city. Overwhelmed in battle to defend Heru, Jones unfurls the enchanted carpet and wishes himself back to New York. The carpet transports him home instantly.

Jones awakens on his doorstep and reunites with Polly, who has anxiously awaited news of his prolonged absence. After receiving confirmation of his long-delayed promotion, he proposes marriage, and is accepted. He records his journey as a fantastical narrative intended for amusement, acknowledging its implausibility.

== In other media ==
Marvel Comics adapted the character for the comic book feature "Gullivar Jones, Warrior of Mars" in Creatures on the Loose #16–21 (March 1972 – January 1973), initially by writer Roy Thomas and the art team of Gil Kane and Bill Everett, and later written by Gerry Conway, followed by science fiction novelist George Alec Effinger. The series moved to Marvel's black and white magazine, Monsters Unleashed No. 4 and No. 8 (1974), written by Tony Isabella with art by David Cockrum and George Pérez. Marvel's version modernized the setting, recasting Gullivar as a Vietnam War veteran. Though this adaptation used many of Arnold's characters and concepts, it was not a strict adaptation of the original book.

Both Gullivar and John Carter appear at the beginning of Volume II in Alan Moore's The League of Extraordinary Gentlemen comic book series.

Gullivar Jones appears alongside a young Edgar Allan Poe in Jean-Marc Lofficier & Randy Lofficier's novel, Edgar Allan Poe on Mars: The Further adventures of Gullivar Jones (2007).

In the fourth volume of the Tales of the Shadowmen anthology, in the short story "Three Men, a Martian and a Baby", Gullivar Jones is briefly encountered by Doctor Omega.

Dynamite Entertainment's 2012 comic miniseries Warriors of Mars crosses over Gullivar Jones with the Barsoom setting. In the comic, Jones' lover Princess Heru was a Red Martian who went on to marry Mors Kajak and became the mother of Dejah Thoris. The Thither People are an isolationist, rarely-seen species existing alongside the Red and Green Martians, and Arnold's River of Death is equated with Burroughs' River Iss.

In Gullivar Jones and the Treasure of the Tsar (2023), now-retired USN Captain Gullivar Jones joins British MI2 agents Abigail Bradshaw and Archibald Smart to find the Fountain of Eternal Youth before Hitler or Stalin can use its fabled waters to create armies of immortal soldiers.

== Audio version ==
- Gulliver of Mars public domain audiobook at LibriVox

== Sources ==
- Bleiler, Everett (1948). The Checklist of Fantastic Literature. Chicago: Shasta Publishers. p. 32.
