= The League of Extraordinary Gentlemen (film) =

2003 superhero film by Stephen Norrington

- Theatrical release poster
- Directed by: Stephen Norrington
- Screenplay by: James Dale Robinson
- Based on: The League of Extraordinary Gentlemen by: Alan Moore; Kevin O'Neill
- Produced by: Don Murphy; Trevor Albert
- Starring: Sean Connery; Shane West; Stuart Townsend; Peta Wilson; Jason Flemyng
- Cinematography: Dan Laustsen
- Edited by: Paul Rubell
- Music by: Trevor Jones
- Production companies: 20th Century Fox; Angry Films; JD Productions; Mediastream Dritte Films
- Distributed by: 20th Century Fox
- Release dates: July 11, 2003 (United States); September 25, 2003 (Czech Republic); October 2, 2003 (Germany); October 17, 2003 (United Kingdom)
- Running time: 110 minutes
- Countries: United States; Germany; Czech Republic; United Kingdom
- Language: English
- Budget: $78 million
- Box office: $179.3 million

The League of Extraordinary Gentlemen, also promoted as LXG, is a 2003 steampunk/dieselpunk superhero film based on some of the characters in the first volume of the comic book series of the same name by Alan Moore and Kevin O'Neill, although the plot bears very little similarity to that of the comic book. Distributed by 20th Century Fox, it was released on 11 July 2003 in the United States, and on 17 October in the United Kingdom. It was directed by Stephen Norrington and stars Sean Connery, Peta Wilson, Naseeruddin Shah, Tony Curran, Stuart Townsend, Shane West, Jason Flemyng, and Richard Roxburgh. It was Connery's final role in a theatrically released live-action film before his retirement in June 2006 and death in October 2020.

As with the comic book source material, the film features prominent pastiche and crossover themes set in the late 19th century. It features an assortment of fictional literary characters appropriate to the period who act as Victorian era superheroes. It draws on the works of Jules Verne, H. G. Wells, Bram Stoker, Sir Arthur Conan Doyle, Sir Henry Rider Haggard, Ian Fleming, Herman Melville, Oscar Wilde, Robert Louis Stevenson, Edgar Allan Poe, Gaston Leroux, and Mark Twain.

It received generally unfavorable reviews but was financially successful, grossing over $179 million worldwide in theaters, and earning rental revenue of $48.6 million and DVD sales (as of 2003) of $36.4 million, against its $78 million budget.

== Plot ==
In 1899, a terrorist group led by the "Fantom" robs the Bank of England for Leonardo da Vinci's blueprints of Venice's foundations, kidnaps German scientists, and destroys a Zeppelin factory in Berlin. With the British and German Empires threatening to start a world war, a British emissary named Sanderson Reed travels to Kenya Colony to recruit retired adventurer and hunter Allan Quatermain. He initially refuses until assassins attempt to kill him. After defeating them, he agrees. In London, Quatermain meets Reed's boss "M", who explains that the Fantom intends to profit from the world war and is going to attack the world's leaders at a conference in Venice in three days. To prevent this, M forms the League of Extraordinary Gentlemen and recruits Quatermain, Captain Nemo, vampire chemist Mina Harker, and invisible thief Rodney Skinner.

The League travels to the London Docklands to recruit Dorian Gray, Mina's former lover, who is immortal due to a missing cursed portrait. The Fantom and his assassins attack the League, but U.S. Secret Service Agent Tom Sawyer intervenes and helps them fend off the attack, forcing the Fantom and his men to retreat. Sawyer then reveals he was sent by the U.S. to join the effort to stop the Fantom. After he and Gray join the League, they capture Edward Hyde in Paris, who transforms back into his alter ego Dr. Henry Jekyll, who also joins the League after being offered amnesty for his crimes. While traveling to Venice in Nemo's submarine, the Nautilus, Jekyll experiences trouble controlling Hyde while the other Leaguers deduce a mole is on board after discovering a camera's flash powder residue in the wheelhouse and someone stole a vial of Jekyll's transformation formula. Suspicion falls on Skinner, but he is nowhere to be found.

The Nautilus arrives in Venice as several hidden bombs detonate, causing the city to collapse. Sawyer uses one of Nemo's automobiles to signal him to launch a missile at a key building to stop the destruction, while Quatermain confronts the Fantom, who is unmasked as M before escaping again. Dorian shoots Nemo's first mate Ishmael and steals the Nautilus's exploration pod, but Ishmael successfully warns the League of his treachery before dying. While pursuing Dorian, the League uncover a phonograph recording that Dorian left revealing M stole Dorian's painting to enlist his aid in manipulating the League to gain Quatermain's help in capturing Hyde, a skin sample from Skinner, Mina's blood, Jekyll's formula, and photos of Nemo's science while an inaudible audio frequency activates several bombs hidden aboard the Nautilus. Jekyll and Hyde join forces to drain the flooded sections while Skinner secretly messages the League, informing them he snuck aboard the exploration pod.

Using Skinner's directions, the League reaches northern Mongolia and locates M's mountain fortress. They soon regroup with Skinner, who reveals M took the kidnapped scientists' families hostage to force them to mass-produce M's work, and he intends to sell a sample case to competing nations. The League split up, with Nemo and Hyde rescuing the scientists and their families, Skinner planting bombs to destroy the fortress, Mina fighting and killing Dorian with his painting, and Quatermain and Sawyer working to capture M, who Quatermain deduces is Professor James Moriarty. Nemo and Hyde complete their task, but are overwhelmed by M's henchman, Dante, after he overdoses on Hyde formula until Skinner's bombs detonate, killing Dante in the collapsing fortress while the pair escape. Quatermain corners M, but an invisible Reed takes Sawyer hostage. Quatermain kills Reed, but M fatally stabs Quatermain before Sawyer kills him in turn. Quatermain dies, wishing Sawyer luck in the new century.

As the League ensures Quatermain is buried in Kenya, they recall how a witch doctor promised that Africa would never let him die. Nemo offers The League a home on the Nautilus; they agree to continue fighting anyone who threatens war in the new century. As the five survivors leave, the witch doctor performs a fiery ritual that summons an unnatural thunderstorm over Quatermain's grave, until lightning strikes the rifle Sawyer left with him.

== Cast ==
- Sean Connery as Allan Quatermain, a legendary adventurer and hunter skilled in tracking, marksmanship, and hand-to-hand combat.
- Shane West as Tom Sawyer, an American Secret Service agent recruited by Quatermain to assist the League.
- Stuart Townsend as Dorian Gray, Mina's former lover and an experienced duelist, rendered immortal by a cursed painting.
- Richard Roxburgh as The Fantom / "M" / Prof. James Moriarty, an old enemy of Sherlock Holmes who uses his penchant for disguises and powerful intellect to manipulate the League.
- Peta Wilson as Dr. Mina Harker, a chemist and martial artist who retains the immortality and vampiric abilities given to her by Count Dracula.
- Tony Curran as Rodney Skinner, a gentleman thief who got his hands on Griffin's invisibility serum.
- Jason Flemyng as Dr. Henry Jekyll / Edward Hyde, a scientist who developed a dual personality after experimenting on himself. In his Hyde form, he has immense strength, endurance, and a love of violence.
- Naseeruddin Shah as Nemo, captain of the Nautilus and a gifted swordsman and scientist.
- David Hemmings as Nigel, an old friend of Allan Quatermain's who poses as him to drive off "story-seekers". He is murdered by Moriarty's agents.
- Max Ryan as Dante, one of Moriarty's henchmen who is transformed into a deranged monster using vast quantities of Jekyll's transformation serum.
- Tom Goodman-Hill as Sanderson Reed, a representative of the British government who recruits Quatermain into the League.
- Terry O'Neill as Ishmael, first mate of the Nautilus.

== Production ==
=== Writing ===
Because 20th Century Fox was unable to secure the rights to the title character of H. G. Wells' 1897 novel, the script referred to "The Invisible Man" as "An Invisible Man", and his name was changed from Hawley Griffin to Rodney Skinner. The Fu Manchu character was dropped. At the request of the studio, the character of Tom Sawyer was added to increase the film's appeal to American audiences and the youth demographic, a move that producer Don Murphy initially dismissed as a "stupid studio note" but later described as "brilliant".

=== Casting ===
After previously turning down the roles of the Architect in The Matrix trilogy and Gandalf in The Lord of the Rings trilogy, the latter of which would reportedly have earned him $450 million, Connery agreed to appear as Quatermain for $17 million, a sum that left the filmmakers with little flexibility to attract other high-profile stars for the ensemble cast.

A character named Eva Draper (Winter Ave Zoli), daughter of German scientist Karl Draper, remained visible in promotional materials despite not appearing in the film's final cut.

=== Filming ===
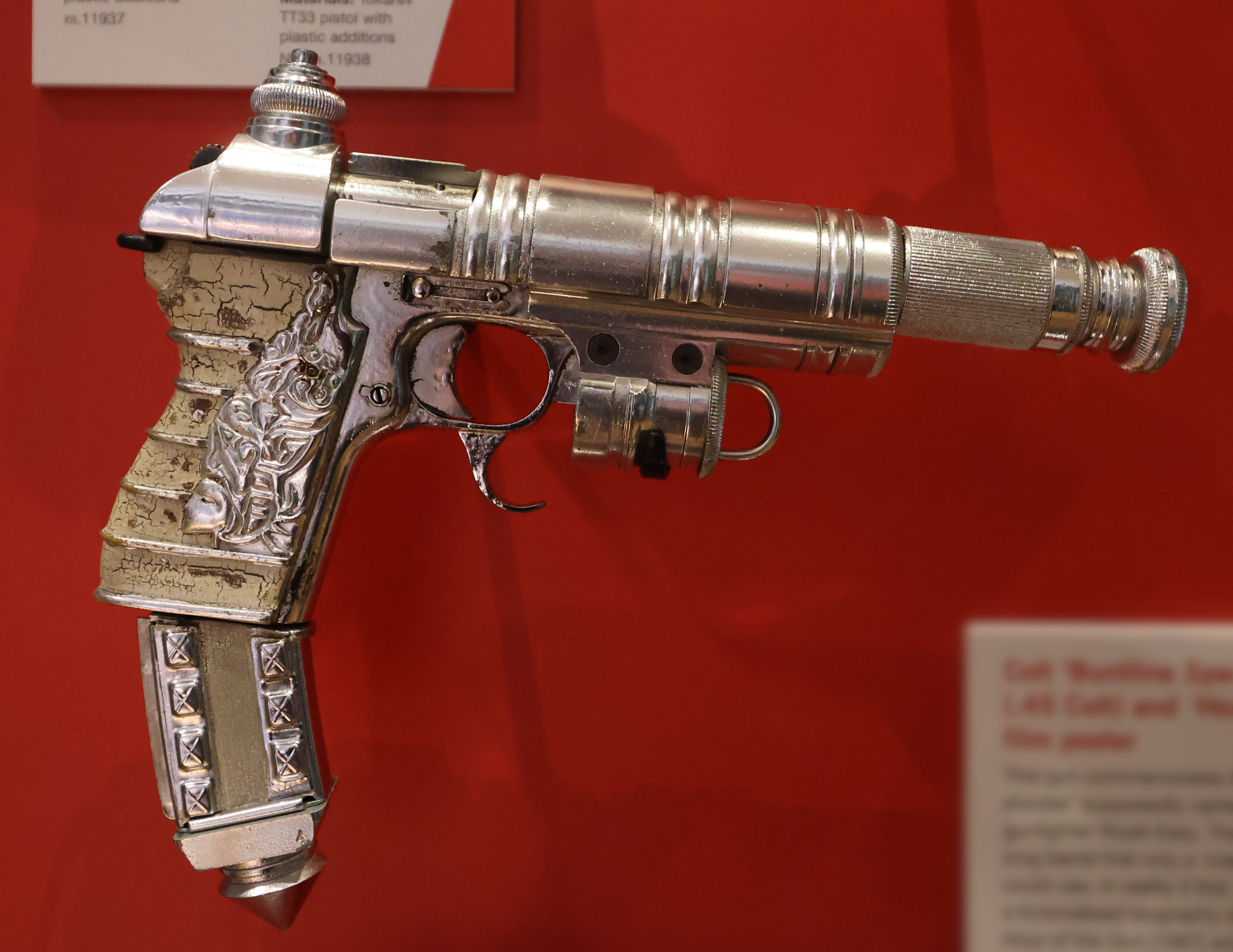
Prop pistol used by Nemo

Principal photography took place in Hungary, Malta, and the Czech Republic.

The studio pressured filmmakers for a summer release because Master and Commander was slated for fall release. The production encountered delays when a special effects set failed to perform as intended, forcing the filmmakers to quickly look for another effects shop.

Connery reportedly had many disputes with director Stephen Norrington. Norrington did not attend the opening party and, on being asked where the director could be, Connery is said to have replied, "Check the local asylum". Norrington reportedly did not like the studio supervision and was "uncomfortable" with large crews.

Connery claimed that making the film and the quality of the finished product convinced him to permanently retire from acting in movies. He told The Times: "It was a nightmare. The experience had a great influence on me, it made me think about showbiz. I get fed up dealing with idiots". As of 2023, Norrington and screenwriter James Dale Robinson have not worked on a live-action, feature-length film since The League of Extraordinary Gentlemen.

== Lawsuit ==
In 2003, Larry Cohen and Martin Poll sued 20th Century Fox for intentionally plagiarizing their script Cast of Characters, which they had pitched to the studio between 1993 and 1996. Noting that the scripts shared public-domain characters that had not appeared in The League of Extraordinary Gentlemen graphic novel series, the suit accused Fox of soliciting the series as a smokescreen. Fox denied the allegations as "absurd nonsense" but settled out of court, a decision Alan Moore believed "denied [him] the chance to exonerate" himself.

== Reception ==
=== Box office ===
The film opened at #2 behind Pirates of the Caribbean: The Curse of the Black Pearl. The League of Extraordinary Gentlemen grossed an estimated $66,465,204 in Canada and the United States, $12,603,037 in the United Kingdom, and $12,033,033 in Spain. Worldwide, the film took in $179,265,204.

=== Critical response ===
On Rotten Tomatoes, the film has an approval rating of 16% based on reviews from 182 critics, with an average rating of 4/10. The site's critical consensus reads, "Just ordinary. LXG is a great premise ruined by poor execution." On Metacritic it has a score of 30% based on reviews from 36 critics, indicating "generally unfavorable reviews". Audiences polled by CinemaScore gave the film an average grade of B−, on an A+ to F scale.

Roger Ebert of the Chicago Sun-Times gave the film one star out of a possible four: "The League of Extraordinary Gentlemen assembles a splendid team of heroes to battle a plan for world domination, and then, just when it seems about to become a real corker of an adventure movie, plunges into ... inexplicable motivations, causes without effects, effects without causes, and general lunacy".

Peter Travers of Rolling Stone also gave it one star out of four, writing, "Except for Connery, who is every inch the lion in winter, nothing here feels authentic".

Owen Gleiberman of Entertainment Weekly gave the film a C− grade.

Empire magazine criticized its exposition and lack of character depth, giving it two stars out of five, and asserting that it "flirts dangerously close with one-star ignominy".

=== Creators' response ===
In an interview with The Times, Kevin O'Neill, illustrator of the comics, said he believed the film adaptation was a critical failure because it was not respectful of its source material. He did not recognize the characters when reading the screenplay and claimed that Norrington and Connery did not cooperate. Finally, O'Neill said that the movie's version of Allan Quatermain compared poorly to the character in the original comics, and that "the whole balance" was changed by "marginalizing Mina [Murray] and making her a vampire."

The comics' author, Alan Moore, has generally been dissatisfied with the films based on his works, but thought that the reputations of the originals would not be affected by the quality of the adaptations. "As long as I could distance myself by not seeing them, enough to keep them separate, take the option money, I could be assured no one would confuse the two. This was probably naïve on my part."

== Accolades ==
The film was nominated for three Saturn Awards for Best Fantasy Film, Peta Wilson for Best Supporting Actress and Best Costume Design but lost to The Lord of the Rings: The Return of the King, Finding Nemo and Pirates of the Caribbean: The Curse of the Black Pearl respectively.

== Home video ==
The League of Extraordinary Gentlemen earned a total of $48,640,000 in rentals, including $14,810,000 from video rentals and $33,830,000 from DVD rentals. DVD sales garnered $36,400,000.

The movie was rereleased on Blu-ray in October 2018 by Fabulous Films.

== In other media ==
A novelization of the movie, written by Kevin J. Anderson, was published shortly before the film's release.

The soundtrack album, the score was composed by Trevor Jones and was released by Varèse Sarabande on iTunes, and later online. It was not sold in stores in the United States.

In the season 10 Family Guy episode "Amish Guy", Peter Griffin wants to ride a roller coaster based on the film called The League of Extraordinary Gentlemen: The Ride.

== Reboot ==
The Tracking Board reported in May 2015 that 20th Century Fox and Davis Entertainment had agreed to develop a reboot, in the hope of launching a franchise, and that a search was underway for a director. John Davis told Collider in an interview that the film would be "female-centric". These plans were reportedly scrapped after the 2019 Disney–Fox merger. However, The Hollywood Reporter revealed in May 2022 that the reboot was back on track as a Hulu release, with Justin Haythe writing, and producer Don Murphy returning, alongside Susan Montford and Erwin Stoff of 3 Arts Entertainment.

== See also ==
- Mashup novel
