= Rainbow Mars =

1999 novel by Larry Niven

- First edition cover
- Author: Larry Niven
- Cover artist: Bob Eggleton
- Language: English
- Genre: Science fiction
- Publisher: Tor Books
- Publication date: 1999
- Publication place: United States
- Media type: Print (hardback & paperback)
- Pages: 316 (hardcover)
- ISBN: 0-312-86777-8
- OCLC: 39887074
- Dewey Decimal: 813/.54 21
- LC Class: PS3564.I9 R3 1999

Rainbow Mars is a 1999 science fiction short story collection by American writer Larry Niven. It contains six stories of Hanville Svetz, five previously published and the longest, "Rainbow Mars", written for the collection. The setting of the Svetz stories is Earth in the distant future. The hereditary leader of the Earth, known as the Secretary General, is an inbred imbecile. In order to maintain the interest of the Secretary, different factions in the capitol use their advanced science to amuse him. Svetz's section uses time travel in an attempt to bring back long extinct animals from Earth's past. Unbeknownst to Svetz and his team, they are actually travelling back into fictional pasts, and returning with mythical creatures.

== Contents ==
- "Rainbow Mars". With a new Secretary General who is interested more in space travel than animals, Svetz uses his time machine to visit Mars, which he finds populated by the creations of Edgar Rice Burroughs, Ray Bradbury, C. S. Lewis, H. G. Wells, and Stanley G. Weinbaum. The story began as a collaboration with Terry Pratchett; a number of his ideas remain in the final draft, mainly the use of Yggdrasil.
- "Get a Horse!", first published in The Magazine of Fantasy and Science Fiction, October 1969. Svetz is sent back in time to capture a horse, but brings back a unicorn instead.
- "Bird in the Hand", first published in The Magazine of Fantasy and Science Fiction, October 1970. Svetz is sent to get a roc, but returns with an ostrich, which he reverse engineers into a roc. A co-worker swipes a prototype of the very first automobile, causing a dangerous problem in the present.
- "Leviathan!", first published in Playboy, August 1970. Svetz is sent to capture the largest mythical creature that was ever imagined, Leviathan.
- "There's a Wolf in My Time Machine", first published in The Magazine of Fantasy and Science Fiction, October 1970. Svetz falls in love with a woman who evolved from a wolf.
- "Death in a Cage", first published in Niven's collection The Flight of the Horse (Ballantine, 1973). Svetz encounters the archetype of the Grim Reaper.
- "Svetz and the Beanstalk", an afterword in which Niven discusses the fictional sources for Rainbow Mars.

== See also ==
- The Long Mars, 2014 novel written as a collaboration by Terry Pratchett and Stephen Baxter involving alternate versions of Mars.
