= The Rivals of Sherlock Holmes (book series) =

Detective story anthology series

The Rivals of Sherlock Holmes is a series of anthologies of detective stories edited by Hugh Greene, a former Director General of the BBC.

Some of the stories were adapted for a television series of the same title, broadcast 1971–1973.

== The Rivals of Sherlock Holmes (1970) ==
Author	Story	Lead character
Max Pemberton	"The Ripening Rubies"	Bernard Sutton
Arthur Morrison	"The Case of Laker, Absconded"	Martin Hewitt
Guy Boothby	"The Duchess of Wiltshire's Diamonds"	Simon Carne/Klimo
Arthur Morrison	"The Affair of the 'Avalanche Bicycle and Tyre Co., Limited'"	Horace Dorrington
Clifford Ashdown	"The Assyrian Rejuvenator"	Romney Pringle
L. T. Meade and Robert Eustace	"Madame Sara"	Eric Vandeleur
Clifford Ashdown	"The Submarine Boat"	Romney Pringle
William Le Queux	"The Secret of the Fox Hunter"	Duckworth Drew
Baroness Orczy	"The Mysterious Death on the Underground Railway"	The Old Man in the Corner
R. Austin Freeman	"The Moabite Cipher"	Dr. John Thorndyke
Baroness Orczy	"The Woman in the Big Hat"	Lady Molly Robertson-Kirk
William Hope Hodgson	"The Horse of the Invisible"	Carnacki
Ernest Bramah	"The Game Played in the Dark"	Max Carrados

== More Rivals of Sherlock Holmes (1971) ==
This volume was published in the United States under the title Cosmopolitan Crimes: Foreign Rivals of Sherlock Holmes.

Author	Story	Lead character
Grant Allen	"The Episode of the Mexican Seer"	Colonel Clay
Grant Allen	"The Episode of the Diamond Links"	Colonel Clay
George Griffith	"Five Hundred Carats"	Inspector Lipinzki
Arnold Bennett	"A Bracelet at Bruges"	Cecil Thorold
Robert Barr	"The Absent-Minded Coterie"	Eugène Valmont
Jacques Futrelle	"The Problem of Cell 13"	Augustus S. F. X. Van Dusen
Maurice Leblanc	"Arsène Lupin in Prison"	Arsène Lupin
Jacques Futrelle	"The Superfluous Finger"	Augustus S. F. X. Van Dusen
Palle Rosenkrantz	"A Sensible Course of Action"	Lieutenant Holst
Balduin Groller	"Anonymous Letters"	Dagobert Trostler
Maurice Leblanc	"The Red Silk Scarf"	Arsène Lupin
E. Phillips Oppenheim	"The Secret of the Magnifique"	John Laxworthy
H. Hesketh Prichard	"The Murder at the Duck Club"	November Joe

== Further Rivals of Sherlock Holmes: The Crooked Counties (1973) ==
Author	Story	Lead character
C.L. Pirkis	"The Redhill Sisterhood"	Loveday Brooke
Arthur Morrison	"The Loss of Sammy Throckett"	Martin Hewitt
Dick Donovan	"The Problem of Dead Wood Hall"	Dick Donovan
Arthur Morrison	"The Case of Janissary"	Horace Dorrington
M. McDonnell Bodkin	"Murder by Proxy"	Paul Beck
Fergus Hume	"The Amber Beads"	Hagar Stanley
M. McDonnell Bodkin	"How He Cut His Stick"	Dora Myrl
L. T. Meade and Clifford Halifax	"A Race with the Sun"	Paul Gilchrist
J. S. Fletcher	"The Contents of the Coffin"	Archer Dawe
Jacques Futrelle	"The Mystery of Room 666"	Howard Meredith
Richard Marsh	"The Man Who Cut Off My Hair"	Judith Lee
Victor Whitechurch	"The Affair of the German Dispatch-Box"	Thorpe Hazell
Ernest Bramah	"The Tragedy at Brookbend Cottage"	Max Carrados

== The American Rivals of Sherlock Holmes (1976) ==
Author	Story	Lead character
Hugh C. Weir	"Cinderella's Slipper"	Madelyn Mack
Rodrigues Ottolengui	"The Nameless Man"	Mr. Barnes and Robert Leroy Mitchel
Rodrigues Ottolengui	"The Montezuma Emerald"	Mr. Barnes and Robert Leroy Mitchel
Josiah Flynt and Alfred Hodder	"Found Guilty"	
Jacques Futrelle	"The Scarlet Thread"	Augustus S. F. X. Van Dusen
William MacHarg and Edwin Balmer	"The Man Higher Up"	Luther Trant
William MacHarg and Edwin Balmer	"The Axton Letters"	Luther Trant
Samuel Hopkins Adams	"The Man Who Spoke Latin"	Average Jones
Francis Lynde	"The Cloudbursters"	Scientific Sprague
Charles Felton Pidgin and J. M. Taylor	"The Affair of Lamson's Cook"	Quincy Adams Sawyer
Arthur B. Reeve	"The Campaign Grafter"	Craig Kennedy
Frederick Irving Anderson	"The Infallible Godahl"	Oliver Armiston
Richard Harding Davis	"The Frame-Up"	Wharton

== Bibliography ==
- Greene, Hugh; editor. The Rivals of Sherlock Holmes. Pantheon Books, 1970; ISBN 0-394-41330-X
- Greene, Hugh; editor. Cosmopolitan Crimes: Foreign Rivals of Sherlock Holmes. Pantheon Books, 1971; ISBN 0-394-47340-X
- Greene, Hugh; editor. Further Rivals of Sherlock Holmes. Pantheon Books, 1973; ISBN 0-394-48827-X
- Greene, Hugh; editor. The American Rivals of Sherlock Holmes. Pantheon Books, 1976; ISBN 0-394-40921-3
