= Graham C. Greene =

British publisher

Graham C. Greene CBE
- Born: Graham Carleton Greene; 10 July 1936; Berlin, Germany
- Died: 10 October 2016 (aged 80); England
- Education: Eton College; University College, Oxford
- Occupation: Publisher
- Employer(s): Secker & Warburg; Jonathan Cape; CBVC Group
- Board member of: Greene King; British Museum; CBVC Group
- Spouse(s): Judith Gordon-Walker (dissolved 1976); Sally Eaton (dissolved 1984)
- Children: 3
- Parents: Hugh Carleton Greene (father); Helga Guinness (mother)
- Relatives: Graham Greene (uncle); Raymond Greene (uncle)

Graham C. Greene, CBE (10 July 1936 – 10 October 2016) was a British publisher who was managing director of Jonathan Cape from 1962 to 1990. He was described by The Times as being among the most influential publishers of his generation, who "belied his quiet and modest manner to become a fierce champion of liberal values and a free press". He was chairman of the British Museum. He was the nephew of novelist Graham Greene.

== Early life and career ==
Graham Carleton Greene was born in Berlin, Germany, to Hugh Carleton Greene (who was The Daily Telegraph's correspondent, and later Director-General of the BBC) and Helga Guinness. Most of his childhood was spent in the United Kingdom, with his education taking place at Eton College and University College, Oxford.

After a period with the Guinness Mahon family bank in London and New York City, Graham decided to move into publishing. He was always referred to in the book trade as "Graham C Greene" to avoid confusion with his novelist uncle.

== Publishing ==
=== Secker & Warburg ===
Beginning with Secker & Warburg in 1958, he became a sales manager for the company. However, he was unable to persuade Fred Warburg to publish Vladimir Nabokov's controversial novel Lolita. Following Tom Maschler's move to Jonathan Cape from Penguin in 1960, Greene decided to join him there in 1962.

=== Jonathan Cape ===
Greene worked at Managing Director of Jonathan Cape, where he re-issued The Future of Socialism by Anthony Crosland. Greene also published Richard Crossman's diaries in 1975, despite the threat of court action by the Attorney General.

=== CBVC Group ===
In 1969, Jonathan Cape joined with Chatto & Windus and later Bodley Head and Virago Books to act as the CBVC Group. Maschler and Greene were the two biggest shareholders and decided to sell the group to Random House. After the sale Greene resigned, working part-time as a literary agent with Ed Victor, serving on the board of Ed Victor Ltd from the time the company was founded, in 1976.

== Other activities ==
=== South Africa and China ===
Greene's publishing work took him to South Africa, where he worked with anti-Apartheid activists such as Nadine Gordimer, who was published by Jonathan Cape. In his role as Publishers’ Association president, Greene worked to establish copyright treaties with China, this brought him into contact with Deng Xiaoping.

=== British Museum ===
For 24 years from 1978, Greene served on the board of the British Museum. Along with museum director Robert Anderson and Sir Claus Moser, Greene helped raise £110 million for the museum. There was pressure for his dismissal from the board after the wrong type of stone was allegedly used on the south portico of the courtyard. He also displeased the Department of Culture, Media and Sport when he refused to impose admission charges.

=== Brewing ===
Greene also served as a director at the family brewery, Greene King.

== Personal life ==
Greene was married to Judith Gordon-Walker, the marriage was dissolved in 1976. His second marriage was to Sally Eaton, which was dissolved in 1984. He had a son named Alexander, a stepdaughter named Charlotte and a stepson. Greene was a nephew of writer Graham Greene and mountaineer Raymond Greene.
