= The Rivals of Sherlock Holmes =

The Rivals of Sherlock Holmes may refer to:

- The Rivals of Sherlock Holmes (book series), edited by Hugh Greene
- The Rivals of Sherlock Holmes (TV series), broadcast in 1971–73
