= Aleksandr Yevtushenko =

Александр Евтушенко, transcribed variously from Russian as e.g. Aleksandr Yevtushenko or Alexander Evtushenko, can refer to:

- Sasha Yevtushenko (b. 1979), BBC Radio director and producer
- Alexander Evtushenko (b. 1993), Russian cyclist
