= May Futrelle =

American novelist

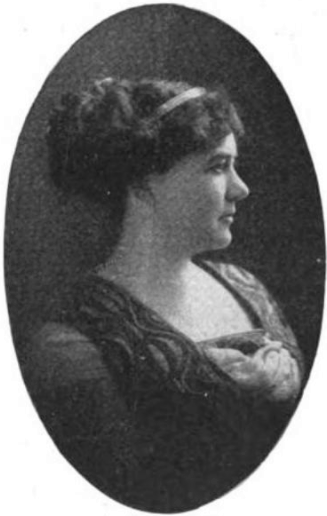
- Born: Lily May Peel; May 26, 1876; Atlanta, Georgia, US
- Died: October 29, 1967 (aged 91); Scituate, Massachusetts, US
- Burial place: St. Mary's Cemetery, Scituate
- Occupation: Writer
- Spouse: Jacques Futrelle (m. 1895; died 1912)
- Children: 2

Lily May Futrelle (née Peel; May 26, 1876 – October 29, 1967) was an American writer.

She and her husband, fellow writer Jacques Futrelle, were passengers on the maiden voyage of RMS Titanic in April 1912. He died in its sinking, after insisting that she board a lifeboat while he remained behind.

== Early life ==
Lily May Peel was born in Atlanta on May 26, 1876. She met journalist Jacques Futrelle while he was working for The Atlanta Journal, and they married on July 17, 1895.

He was offered a job with the New York Herald, and the couple moved to Gramercy Park, where their social circle included O. Henry and Edith Wharton. The Futrelles had a daughter together in 1897, and a son in 1899.

The family lived in Scituate, Massachusetts and Richmond, Virginia during a period when Jacques was unable to work due to strain he experienced while working long hours to cover the Spanish–American War. They returned to Massachusetts when he was hired by the Boston American.

Beginning in 1905, Jacques published a series of mystery stories about a detective known as "The Thinking Machine". May collaborated on one of these, "The Grinning God", where she wrote the first half as a scenario that the detective supposedly could not solve, and Jacques completed it. The stories became extremely popular, and the couple were able to afford luxuries such as a new house in Scituate (which they named "Stepping Stones"), an early automobile, and trips on ocean liners. May later recalled, "We used to cross the Atlantic at the drop of a telegram."

== Voyage on Titanic ==
Early in 1912, Jacques and May sailed to Europe to promote his stories and to do research for further ones. Their children remained behind with Jacques' parents. They were successful in securing contracts for $30,000 – including $17,000 in cash advances – from European publishers.

For the return leg of their journey, the White Star Line presented them with a free suite aboard RMS Titanic, which was making its much-heralded maiden voyage from Southampton to New York. This was tragically cut short when the ship struck an iceberg and sank on April 15, 1912. In her detailed account of the disaster, published in the April 21 and 22 issues of The Boston Post, Futrelle wrote of how Jacques insisted that she get into a lifeboat while he remained onboard, urging her to think of their children.

The last I saw of my husband he was standing beside Colonel Astor. He had a cigarette in his mouth. As I watched him, he lighted a match and held it in his cupped hands before his face. By its light I could see his eyes roam anxiously out over the water. Then he dropped his head toward his hands and lighted his cigarette. I saw Colonel Astor turn toward Jacques and a second later Jacques handed the colonel his cigarette box. The colonel screened Jacques' hands with his own, and their faces stood out together as the match flared at the cigarette tip. I know those hands never trembled.

This was not an act of bravado. Both men must have realized that they must die.

May Futrelle was among the passengers rescued by RMS Carpathia. Though Jacques' name was included on one list of survivors published in the following days, this proved to be an error, and his body was never found.

In January 1913, she filed a petition for $300,000 in compensation from the White Star Line for her husband's death, as well as $4,791 for the loss of his personal property and $4,378 for hers, including two unpublished books. In 1915, she and four other litigants were permitted by a judge to withdraw their claims in American courts and bring them in English courts instead. However, this was too late to meet the one-year limit imposed on wrongful death claims. All survivors' suits were eventually settled, with the company paying out a total of $664,000, a small fraction of the amounts originally sought.

== Writing career and later life ==
May Futrelle began writing as a teenager, and her first published short story appeared in The Saturday Evening Post.

Her first novel, Secretary of Frivolous Affairs, was published in 1911. The National Magazine described it as "a sprightly tale" which was "written in a delightful manner". It went on to be a bestseller for six consecutive years. It was made into a silent film featuring May Allison and Carol Holloway in 1915.

After losing Jacques, she worked to repay the cash advances he had received during their last trip to Europe. She published his novel My Lady's Garter with the dedication "To the Heroes of the Titanic" in 1912, followed by Blind Man's Bluff in 1914.

In 1917, she brought suit against Universal for producing a filmed play of her husband's story "The Haunted Bell" after she had denied them permission. She won and was awarded $2,500.

Futrelle taught writing clinics, and in the 1930s she hosted the radio program Do You Want To Be a Writer?, which was broadcast on WEEI in Boston.

A member of the National League of American Pen Women, she served as its national chairman of copyrights. In 1940, she lobbied for an amendment to the United States Copyright Act to allow authors to renew copyrights for an additional 28 years after their initial 28-year terms. After passage of the bill, known as S. 547, President Franklin D. Roosevelt made her a gift of the pen he had used to sign it into law.

May Futrelle spent her later years in Scituate, casting a bouquet of flowers into the ocean on every anniversary of Jacques' death. She died at a nursing home there on October 29, 1967, and was buried at St. Mary's Cemetery.

== Selected works ==
- "The Grinning God" (1907), short story, co-written with Jacques Futrelle
- Secretary of Frivolous Affairs (1911), novel
- Lieutenant What's-His-Name (1915), novel, elaborated from Jacques Futrelle's The Simple Case of Susan
