= New End Hospital =

- North West Thames Regional Health Authority
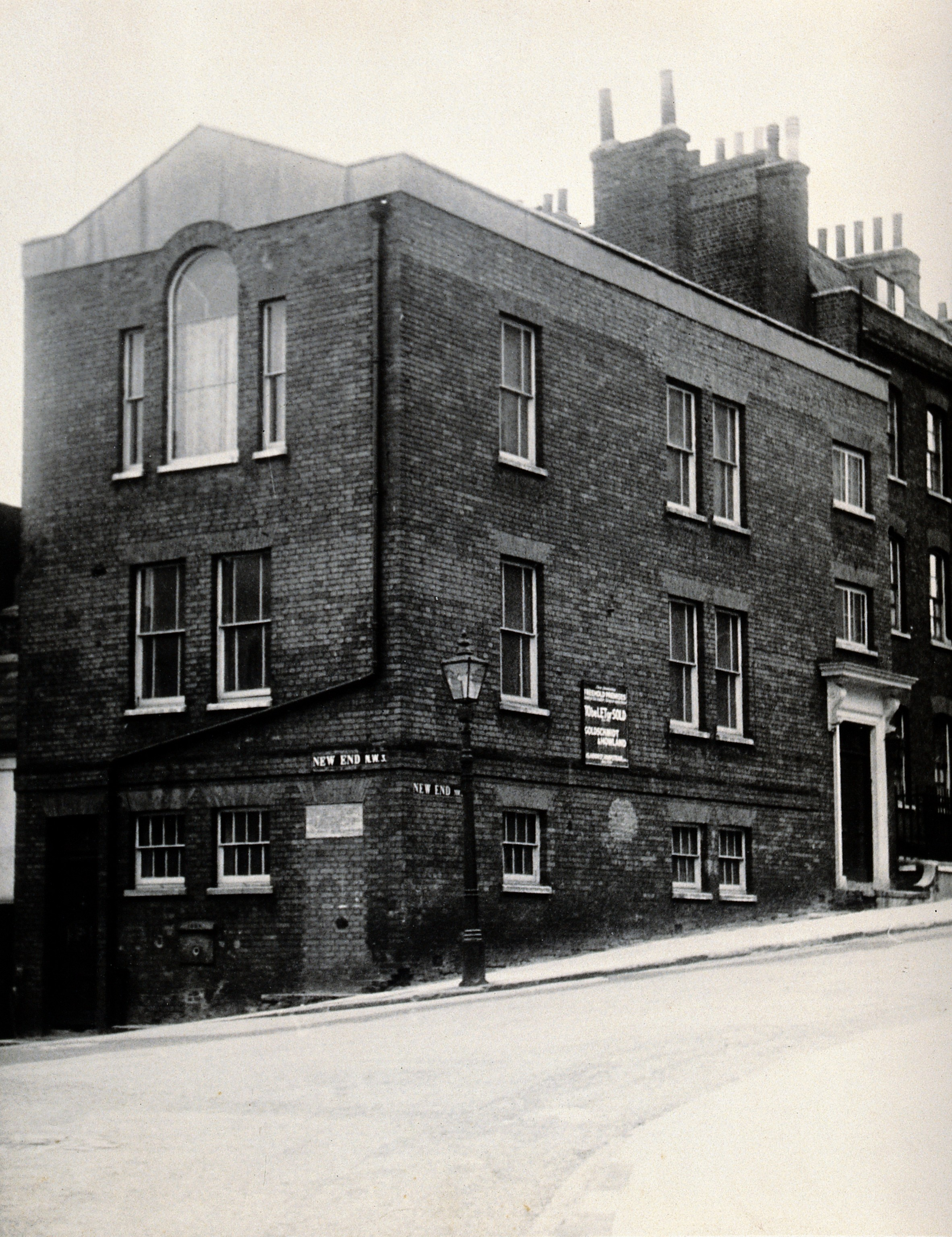
- New End Hospital dispensary

- Location within Camden

Geography
- Location: Hampstead, London, England, United Kingdom
- Coordinates: 51°33′30″N 0°10′40″W

Organisation
- Care system: NHS England

History
- Founded: 1800
- Closed: 1986

Links
- Lists: Hospitals in England

New End Hospital was a hospital in Hampstead, north London. It was founded in 1869 as the infirmary for the Hampstead Union workhouse, and operated until 1986. The buildings have now been redeveloped as housing.

== History ==
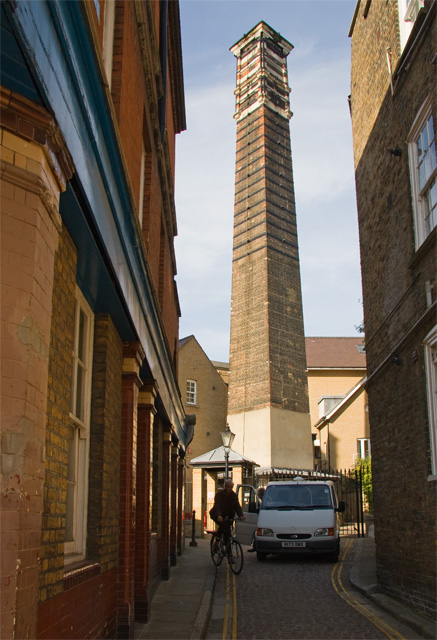
A boilerhouse chimney which was once part of the hospital, and which is retained as a landmark

New End Hospital was founded as the infirmary for the Hampstead workhouse in 1869.

Until the outbreak of First World War, New End Hospital's patients included the unemployed, homeless, and unmarried mothers, and their children. It also had an infirmary for the treatment of psychiatric patients. During the First World War New End Hospital was primarily used for the treatment of wounded and shell-shocked soldiers.

London County Council (LCC) assumed administration of the hospital in 1930 under the Local Government Act1 1929. At this time the hospital had 260 beds. The medical superintendent at the time was R. H. Swindells, MB., ChB, FRCS (Edin) and the matron was Miss E. Fisher. Esther Fisher was matron from 1921 to 1938 and was notable for being a founding member of the College of Nursing (now the Royal College of Nursing), for establishing nurse training for men at the hospital and as author of a nursing text book.

Nurses' badge

Sir Thomas Peel Dunhill established a Thyroid Clinic in 1931 for the treatment of patients with toxic goitre and myasthenia gravis. Under the influence of Raymond Greene, it became well known as a centre for endocrinology and a leading centre for the study and treatment of thyroid disease. It joined the National Health Service in 1948 under the management of the North East Metropolitan Regional Hospital Board. It remained in use until 1986, when it was sold and the proceeds used to fund the redevelopment of Queen Mary's Maternity Home.

The former hospital mortuary served as the New End Theatre before being converted into a Jewish cultural centre in 2011.

== See also ==
- Healthcare in London
- List of hospitals in England
