= The Rivals of Sherlock Holmes (TV series) =

British TV anthology series (1971–1973)

- Genre: Anthology; Period drama Crime; Mystery; Detective
- Starring: Various
- Country of origin: United Kingdom
- Original language: English
- No. of series: 2
- No. of episodes: 26

Production
- Running time: 50 minutes
- Production company: Thames Television

Original release
- Network: ITV
- Release: 20 September 1971 – 7 May 1973

The Rivals of Sherlock Holmes is a British anthology mystery television series produced by Thames Television which was originally broadcast on the ITV Network. There were two series of 13 fifty-minute episodes; the first aired in 1971, the second in 1973. The programme presented adaptations of short mystery, suspense or crime stories featuring, as the title suggests, detectives who were literary contemporaries of Arthur Conan Doyle's Sherlock Holmes.

The Rivals of Sherlock Holmes took its inspiration – and title – from a series of published anthologies by Hugh Greene, younger brother of author Graham Greene and the former director-general of the BBC. Greene is credited on the programme as a creative consultant.

== Cast ==
=== Recurring ===
- Douglas Wilmer as Augustus S. F. X. Van Dusen (2 episodes)
- Peter Vaughan as Horace Dorrington (2 episodes)
- Kenneth Colley as Farrish (2 episodes)
- Petronella Barker as Miss Parrot (2 episodes)
- Peter Barkworth as Martin Hewitt (2 episodes)
- Ronald Hines as Jonathan Pryde (2 episodes)

=== Guests ===
- Henri Szeps as Laval (1 episode)
- Peter Sallis as Dr. Jervis (1 episode)
- Reg Lye as Mortuary Superintendent (1 episode)

== Episode list ==
=== Series 1 ===
No. overall	No. in series	Title	Author of original story	Original release date
1	1	"A Message from the Deep Sea"	R. Austin Freeman	20 September 1971
John Neville as Dr John Thorndyke, forensic scientist
2	2	"The Missing Witness Sensation"	Ernest Bramah	27 September 1971
Robert Stephens as Max Carrados, blind detective
3	3	"The Affair of the Avalanche Bicycle & Tyre Co. Ltd."	Arthur Morrison	4 October 1971
Peter Vaughan as Horace Dorrington, corrupt detective
4	4	"The Duchess of Wiltshire's Diamonds"	Guy Boothby	11 October 1971
Roy Dotrice as Simon Carne, gentleman thief
5	5	"The Horse of the Invisible"	William Hope Hodgson	18 October 1971
Donald Pleasence as Thomas Carnacki, occult detective
6	6	"The Case of the Mirror of Portugal"	Arthur Morrison	25 October 1971
Peter Vaughan as Horace Dorrington, corrupt detective
7	7	"Madame Sara"	L. T. Meade and Robert Eustace	1 November 1971
John Fraser as Dixon Druce, trade investigator
8	8	"The Case of the Dixon Torpedo"	Arthur Morrison	8 November 1971
Ronald Hines as Jonathan Pryde, (Note: Jonathan Pryde is an original TV creation, replacing Martin Hewitt from Arthur Morrison's stories.)
9	9	"The Woman in the Big Hat"	Baroness Orczy	15 November 1971
Elvi Hale as Lady Molly of Scotland Yard
10	10	"The Affair of the Tortoise"	Arthur Morrison	22 November 1971
Peter Barkworth as Martin Hewitt, working-class detective
11	11	"The Assyrian Rejuvenator"	Clifford Ashdown (R. Austin Freeman and John Pitcairn)	29 November 1971
Donald Sinden as Romney Pringle, reformed con artist
12	12	"The Ripening Rubies"	Max Pemberton	6 December 1971
Robert Lang as Bernard Sutton, professional jeweller
13	13	"The Case of Laker, Absconded"	Arthur Morrison	13 December 1971
Peter Barkworth and Ronald Hines as Martin Hewitt and Jonathan Pryde

=== Series 2 ===
No. overall	No. in series	Title	Author of original story	Original release date
14	1	"The Mysterious Death on the Underground Railway"	Baroness Orczy	29 January 1973
Judy Geeson as Polly Burton, (Note: The screenplay for this episode rewrites the original story to make Polly Burton, the secondary character in Baroness Orczy's "The Old Man in the Corner" stories, the detective in this episode.) lady journalist
15	2	"Five Hundred Carats"	George Griffith	5 February 1973
Barry Keegan as Inspector Lipinzki, South African police detective
16	3	"Cell 13"	Jacques Futrelle	12 February 1973
Douglas Wilmer as Professor Van Dusen, the Thinking Machine
17	4	"The Secret of the Magnifique"	E. Phillips Oppenheim	19 February 1973
Bernard Hepton as John Laxworthy, reformed criminal
18	5	"The Absent-Minded Coterie"	Robert Barr	26 February 1973
Charles Gray as Eugene Valmont, private investigator
19	6	"The Sensible Action of Lieutenant Holst"	Palle Rosenkrantz	5 March 1973
John Thaw as Lieutenant Holst, Danish police detective
20	7	"The Superfluous Finger"	Jacques Futrelle	12 March 1973
Douglas Wilmer as Prof Van Dusen, the Thinking Machine
21	8	"Anonymous Letters"	Balduin Groller (Adalbert Goldscheider)	19 March 1973
Ronald Lewis as Dagobert Trostler, Viennese sleuth
22	9	"The Moabite Cypher"	R. Austin Freeman	26 March 1973
Barrie Ingham as Dr John Thorndyke, forensic scientist
23	10	"The Secret of the Fox Hunter"	William Le Queux	2 April 1973
Derek Jacobi as Duckworth Drew of the Secret Service
24	11	"The Looting of the Specie Room"	C. J. Cutcliffe Hyne	9 April 1973
Ronald Fraser as Mr Horrocks, ship's purser
25	12	"The Mystery of the Amber Beads"	Fergus Hume	16 April 1973
Sara Kestelman as Hagar Stanley, Gypsy detective
26	13	"The Missing Q.C.s"	John Oxenham (William Arthur Dunkerley)	7 May 1973
Robin Ellis as Charles Dallas, defence barrister

== Reception ==
=== Critical response ===
Jon E. Lewis and Penny Stempel described The Rivals of Sherlock Holmes as a "gaslight crime anthology" that "usually dependably" presented Victorian, "atmosphere‑drenched" cases featuring Holmes' contemporaries.

Jeffrey Kauffman of DVD Talk who reviewed the first series of the show recommended it but found it to be a bit disappointing in some areas. Paul Mavis of DVD Talk who reviewed the second series of the show called it "terrifically entertaining" and "perfect" for a "Saturday night viewing when you want something quick, something mysterious, and something English".

Percival Wexley-Smith of Television Heaven called the series a true gem of the early 1970s for British television.

=== Awards ===
In 1972, the first series of the show won a BAFTA Award for Best Design.

== Home media ==
The first series was released on a 4-disc Region 2 DVD set by Network Distributing on 15 June 2009. Acorn Media released a Region 1 version of this set on 1 September 2009. Series Two was released on a Network DVD 4-disc Region 2 release on 15 February 2010; Acorn followed with a Region 1 version on 27 April.

== Bibliography ==
- Greene, Hugh; editor. The Rivals of Sherlock Holmes. Pantheon Books, 1970; ISBN 0-394-41330-X
- Greene, Hugh; editor. Cosmopolitan Crimes: Foreign Rivals of Sherlock Holmes. Pantheon Books, 1971; ISBN 0-394-47340-X
- Greene, Hugh; editor. Further Rivals of Sherlock Holmes. Pantheon Books, 1973; ISBN 0-394-48827-X
- Greene, Hugh; editor. The American Rivals of Sherlock Holmes. Pantheon Books, 1976; ISBN 0-394-40921-3
