= The Problem of Cell 13 =

- Short story by Jacques Futrelle
- Country: United States
- Language: English
- Genre: Mystery fiction

Publication
- Published in: Boston American
- Publication type: newspaper
- Publication date: October 30 – November 5, 1905

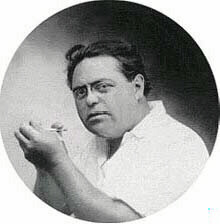
Jacques Futrelle

"The Problem of Cell 13" is a short story by Jacques Futrelle. It was first published in 1905 and later collected in The Thinking Machine (1907), which was featured in crime writer H. R. F. Keating's list of the 100 best crime and mystery books ever published. Science fiction and mystery author Harlan Ellison recalled that this story was his selection for "Lawrence Block's Best Mysteries of the Century".

== Plot summary ==
Like Futrelle's other short stories, "The Problem of Cell 13" features Augustus S. F. X. Van Dusen as the main character, although most of the story is seen through the perspective of a prison warden. While in a scientific debate with two men, Dr. Charles Ransome and Alfred Fielding, Augustus, "The Thinking Machine", insists that nothing is impossible when the human mind is properly applied. To prove this, he agrees that he will take part in an experiment in which he will be incarcerated in a prison for one week and given the challenge of escaping.

== Adaptations ==
The story was adapted for television by Arthur A. Ross in 1962 as part of the U.S. series Kraft Mystery Theater. The episode starred Claude Dauphin as Van Dusen, and was awarded the 1963 Edgar Award for Best Episode in a TV Series.

"Cell 13", a 1973 adaptation for the British series The Rivals of Sherlock Holmes, featured Douglas Wilmer, famous for his portrayal of Holmes in BBC productions of the sixties, as the Professor.

In 1978, West Berlin radio station RIAS produced and broadcast "Das sicherste Gefängnis der Welt" (The Safest Prison in the World), a radio play based on the story. This was the second of 79 Van Dusen stories so adapted.

In 2011, the story was adapted for BBC Radio 4's series The Rivals by Chris Harrald. The story was directed by Sasha Yevtushenko and starred Paul Rhys as Professor Van Dusen.

A stage version premiered at Broadway Onstage in Michigan in 2011. Adapted by John Arden McClure, it starred Donald Couture as the warden, and Sarah Oravetz as the Hutchinson Hatch character, changed to Anne Hatch in this version.

On the NBC series The Blacklist, specifically the episode aired January 18, 2019 titled "The Pawn Brokers", main character Raymond Reddington established contact outside prison with an identical rat-and-thread technique.

== Selected bibliography ==
Collections in which this story appears include:

- Tony Hillerman and Otto Penzler, ed. (2000). The Best American Mystery Stories of the Century. Houghton Mifflin Co. ISBN 0-618-01267-2.
- Otto Penzler, ed. (1998). The 50 Greatest Mysteries of All Time.
- Rex Burns and Mary Rose Sullivan, ed. (1990). Crime Classics: The Mystery Story from Poe to the Present. Viking Penguin. ISBN 0-14-013128-0.
- Douglas G. Greene, ed. (1987). Death Locked In. International Polygonics. ISBN 1-56619-454-7.
- Saul Schwartz, ed. (1975). The Detective Story. ISBN 0-8442-5613-7.
- William H. Larson, ed. (1968). Seven Great Detective Stories. Western Publishing Company, Inc.
- Ellery Queen, ed. (1941). 101 Years Entertainment. Modern Library.
- Dick Allen and David Chacko, ed. (1974). Detective fiction: Crime and Compromise. Harcourt Brace Jovanovich. ISBN 0-15-517408-8.
- Vincent Starrett, ed. (1928). Fourteen Great Detective Stories. Modern Library.
