= A Child of the Jago =

1896 novel by Arthur Morrison

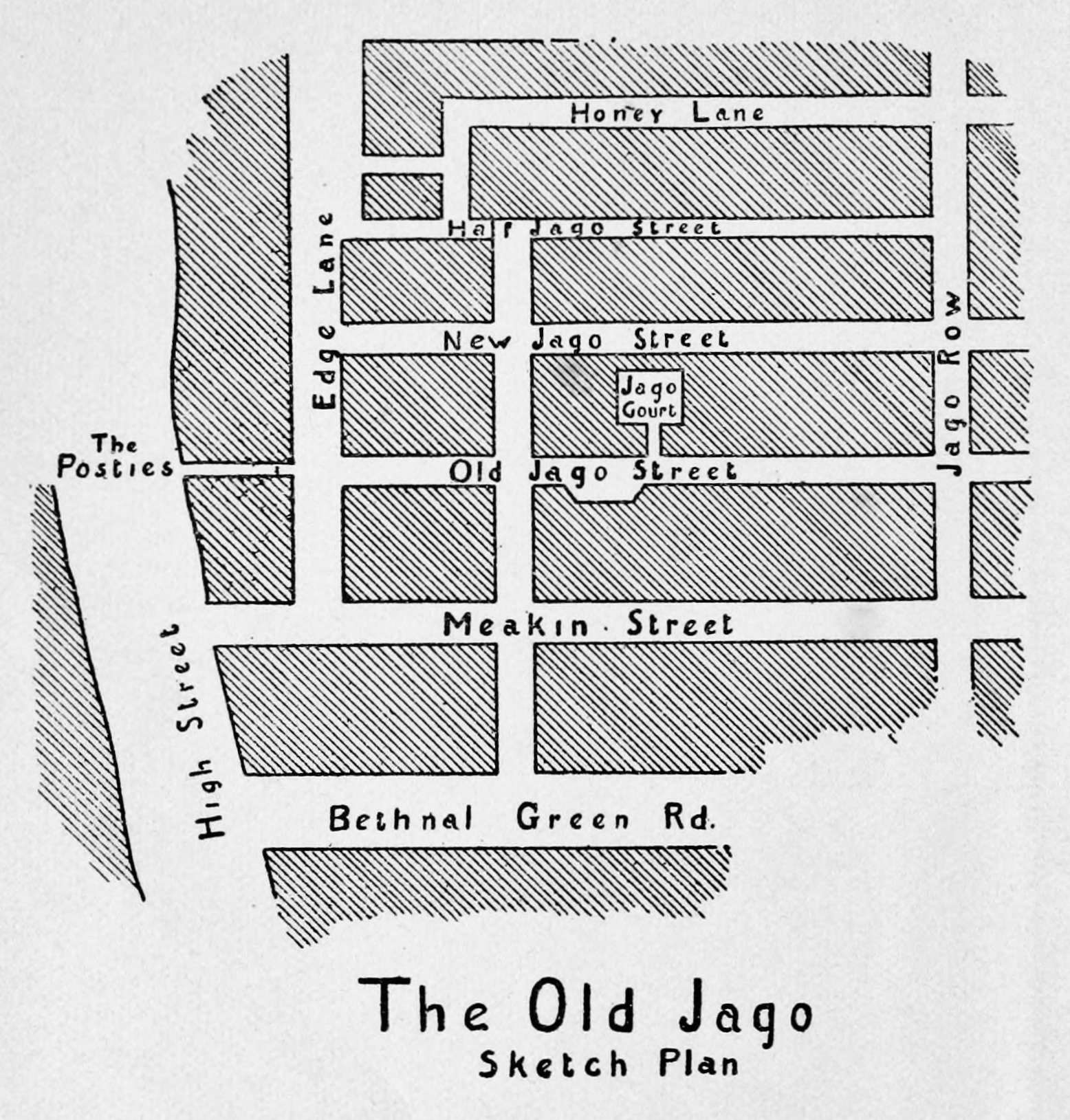
- A sketch of the Old Jago from the first American edition of A Child of the Jago, 1896
- Author: Arthur Morrison
- Language: English
- Published: 1896
- Publication place: United Kingdom
- Media type: Print

A Child of the Jago is an 1896 novel by Arthur Morrison. It recounts the brief life of Dicky Perrott, a child living in the "Old Jago", a fictionalisation of the Old Nichol slum in Bethnal Green.

== Background ==
A bestseller in its time, it recounts the brief life of Dicky Perrott, a child growing up in the "Old Jago", a fictionalisation of the Old Nichol, a slum located between Shoreditch High Street and Bethnal Green Road in the East End of London. After Morrison's publication of Tales of Mean Streets Reverend Arthur Osborne Jay, whose parish area included the Old Nichol, encouraged Morrison to write about the area; Morrison subsequently frequented the Old Nichol for a year to come up with material for his book. Journalist Sarah Wise wrote that, according to historian David Rich, Morrison came up with the name Jago in reference to Reverend Jay because "it's where Jay goes". The late-nineteenth-century English novelist George Gissing, who read the novel on Christmas Day 1896, felt that it was "poor stuff".

== Synopsis ==
The novel opens after midnight on a hot summer night, when many of the residents of the Jago, likened to “great rats”, prefer to sleep in the street to avoid the oppressive heat and stench of the closely packed houses. A man lured into a dwelling by a woman is brutally coshed, robbed and dragged unconscious into the street where others remove his boots. Dicky Perrott, 8 or 9 years old (the uncertainty is telling) makes his way home to the single room in which his family dwells, where he finds his mother, Hannah Perrott and flea-bitten baby sister, Looey, but only a crust of bread to eat. As dawn breaks his father, Josh Perrott, returns home with a club sticky with blood and hair, suggesting another robbery.

Looking for cake and tea Dicky visits the East End Elevation Mission where well-intentioned middle-class ‘missionaries’ seek to educate and civilise. He dodges the young man on the door and takes the opportunity to steal a gold watch from a bishop. Returning home he proudly hands it to his father, who beats him for stealing but keeps the watch to sell for himself.

Two families, the Ranns and the Learys, dominate the Jago, and one of their periodic violent confrontations breaks out. Sally Green, of the Leary clan, whose method of fighting is to hold down her opponent and chew viciously on the back of the neck, triumphs over the Rann's female champion, Nora Walsh, and proudly displays a bunch of her clotted hair as a trophy. Hannah Perrott, taking Looey out with her to buy food, is attacked by Sally Green and only rescued when Nora Walsh breaks a bottle and repeatedly stabs Sally in the face. Elsewhere there is a murder in the street when Fag Dawson is stabbed and the police descend in force on the Jago. Josh Perrott vows to fight Sally Green's brother, Billy Leary.

Dicky encounters Aaron Weech, proprietor of a local coffee shop and a fence. Weech has heard about Dicky stealing the watch, and the punishment he received, and offers him coffee and cake. Weech suggests that in future Dicky should bring what he steals straight to him, and points out that Dicky is now in debt to him for the refreshments. Returning home, Dicky passes a clergyman, who, he imagines, has only ventured into the Jago because the police are present. Looey is ill but disregarded by her mother. Dicky sees that the door to the Roper family's room opposite is open, and ventures inside. He steals their clock, but as he descends the stairs he is confronted by the Roper's son, Bobby, and the two struggle before Dicky breaks free and takes the clock to Mr Weech. Other residents of the house also enter the Ropers’ room and steal their belongings. The Ropers, already despised and resented due to their perceived relative gentility, return and are attacked by the Jagos, until they are saved by the intervention of the clergyman, Father Sturt, who cows the crowd and retrieves the stolen property.

Dicky feels sorry for the Ropers and resolves to replace their clock with something. He steals a music box and is chased back to the Jago, narrowly avoiding capture. Father Sturt arranges for the Ropers to take up lodging in nearby Dove Lane and Dicky secretes the music box in the cart carrying away their belongings.

Josh Perrott defeats Billy Leary in their fight, winning £5 in prize money and bets, and celebrates with Hannah in a pub. Looey dies whilst left behind in their room, and as Dicky sobs over his sister's corpse, Josh and Hannah return to the pub.

Four years pass. Father Sturt plans to build a church on Jago Court. Although by now a hardened thief who has received a birching, Dicky occasionally attends school. He returns home one day to see the Ropers’ clock on the family mantlepiece. Weech has given this to Josh in return for stolen tobacco. Another child has been born, and Looey is “forgotten”. Dicky and Bobby Roper's mutual antagonism continues, with Roper delighting in informing on Dicky's transgressions at school and Dicky retaliating violently.

Father Sturt, after finding Dicky weaving rush bags, sees hope that the boy can make an honest life and secures a job for him at Mr Grinder's hardware shop. Dicky takes to the work with pride and daydreams of one day having his own shop. Weech, fearful that Dicky will inform, or averse to losing a source of income, tells Mr Grinder that Dicky has offered to sell him stock from the shop and Dicky is dismissed, vowing to turn his back on the idea of honest employment, and returning to Grinder's to steal the very items Weech had lied about, and, ironically, taking those items to Weech. Dicky hears his mother and father speculating that someone has lied about him to Mr Grinder. Dicky assumes it was Bobby Roper.

Following a violent outbreak of the intermittent rivalry with the neighbourhood of Dove Lane the residents of the Jago invite their enemies to a social evening in Mother Gapp's pub. The rotten floor of the club-room gives way and in the confusion both Dove Lane and Jago factions think they are under attack and retaliate. In the melee Dicky assaults Bobby Roper who falls into the cellar.

Josh Perrott breaks into a house, assaults the occupier and steals a valuable watch. The victim is a gangster, one of the ‘High Mob’, and a warning not to receive the stolen watch goes out to all the fences of London. Josh's attempts to dispose of the watch are frustrated and he finally offers it to Weech, who betrays him, leading to a sentence of five years imprisonment. As Hannah Perrott struggles to survive, Kiddo Cook, encouraged by Father Sturt, begins to make a respectable living selling fruit and vegetables, some of which he kindly donates to the Perrotts. Hannah delivers another baby boy,’Little Josh’.

Four years pass and Josh is released. He confides in Bill Rann that it was Weech who betrayed him and the two men conspire to burgle Weech's shop. Josh deliberately wakes Weech who screams for help. As Rann escapes and a crowd gathers outside, Josh menaces Weech with a knife, telling him that as well as betraying him he has worked out that it was Weech that caused Dicky's dismissal from the shop. Josh kills Weech but is seen by the crowd, and despite getting away from the scene, he is hunted down, tried, convicted and hanged.

A week after his father's execution, an enraged Dicky speaks to Jerry Gullen, suggesting that his donkey may soon die. Gullen retorts that the donkey will probably outlive Dicky. A few minutes later, desperate to engage in violence, Dicky joins a fight between Jagos and Dove Laners. From behind he is fatally stabbed by Bobby Roper.

== Characters ==
=== Dicky Perrott ===
At the start of the novel Dicky Perrott's age is uncertain. He looks about 5 physically but is probably 8 or 9, undernourished and roaming the streets. When the narrative jumps forward 4 years he is around 12 and then we see him finally at 16 or 17. Dicky's affectionate nature and willingness to work provides a glimmer of hope that he can escape from the corruption of the Jago, but this hope is cynically thwarted by the avaricious Weech. The criminalising of innocence in an environment of poverty and crime echoes the predicament of Oliver in Oliver Twist, but with a starkly different outcome.

=== Josh Perrott ===
The principal attribute of Josh Perrott is his physical toughness. He beats his children and wife but seldom and lightly by Jago standards and ensures that they are fed to some degree. His callousness is made clear by his indifference to the death of his baby daughter and he kills Weech with malice aforethought. His flight from the murder scene, in the face of a baying mob, is reminiscent of that of Bill Sikes in Oliver Twist.

=== Hannah Perrott ===
Daughter of a boilermaker, a relatively prestigious occupation, and thus fallen on hard times and very much ill at ease in the Jago, where she is resented. She barely steps outside her room, indulging in self-pity and ignoring the needs of her children. Her occasional forays are disastrous, she is assaulted in the street by Sally Green, and while she relaxes in Mother Gapps with the victorious Josh her neglected baby dies. It is the despised Pigeony Poll who provides what little motherly affection the children receive.

=== Looey Perrott ===
The pitiable life and shocking death of ten month old Looey is made more poignant by the matter of fact way in which it is presented. We see her hungry and listless, with a badly flea-bitten face. She is injured when her mother is attacked in the street by Sally Green and only Dicky appears to care anything for her. Immediately after her death her parents blithely return to the public house and she is soon forgotten when another baby is born.

=== Little Josh Perrott ===
Born at the end of the novel, Little Josh signifies the cyclical nature of life in the Jago. His infant cursing suggests that his future character will replicate that of his father.

=== Kiddo Cook ===
Kiddo is Father Sturt's one success. Always jovial and sharp, he is sufficiently self-aware and industrious to make something of himself with his fruit and vegetable enterprise and secure a chance of escape from the Jago. He marries Pigeony Poll, thus uniting two of the more compassionate characters in the novel.

=== Pigeony Poll ===
Poll is despised as a harlot but throughout the narrative emerges to give sympathy and support to Dicky, Hannah and Looey.

=== Aaron Weech ===
Weech, in his cynical corruption of children, is reminiscent of Dickens’ Fagin in Oliver Twist. Although commonly taken as an implicitly Jewish character, Morrison adamantly insisted that Weech was not a Jew.

=== Bobby Roper ===
Usually described throughout as a little hunchback, Bobby Roper's bitter enmity with Dicky is perpetuated by a series of events which fuel their mutual antagonism, as when Dicky secretes his gift of a music-box in the Ropers’ cart. In a bitter twist it is Bobby Roper who ends Dicky's life.

=== Father Sturt ===
The sole figure of authority and respectability in the Jago, Father Sturt has integrity and courage, able to face down Jago ruffians and constantly seeking to improve the behaviour and prospects of his parishioners. He provides a stark contrast in morality with the Jago culture. Morrison based Father Sturt on Reverend Arthur Osborne Jay.

=== Jerry Gullen's Canary ===
Jerry Gullen's Canary was no bird but a neglected old donkey. In a novel where human beings are regularly compared with vermin, Gullen's donkey provides Dicky with an unusual father-figure, a dumb creature whom he seeks out and can confide in. The donkey's neglect is illustrative of the disregard for children and animals in the Jago.

== Themes ==
=== Poverty ===
The Jago is a deprived area in which hardly anyone has honest employment or any prospect of it. Existence is solely about survival on a day-to-day basis. Money is squandered in gambling or on drink and tobacco, and children go unfed. In such an environment survival is a matter of ruthlessness and opportunism.

=== Crime and violence ===
Because of the prevailing poverty of the Jago, crime is the only practical means of income for most residents. Everything that can be stolen is fair game, and the weak are preyed upon by the strong. Violence is endemic and extreme. We see Dicky savagely beaten by his father for stealing a watch, a watch which Josh immediately goes out and sells. In shocking scenes of violence Sally Green is repeatedly stabbed in the face with a broken bottle by Nora Walsh, and a carman, venturing into the citadel of the Jago is robbed and kicked unconscious.

=== Family and parenthood ===
Contrasting elements of the family are depicted. Clan affiliation leads to vicious factional fighting between Ranns and Learys, yet the neglect of children is stark. Looey is allowed to decline until death, unloved and unmourned. Children seldom attend school but are allowed to roam dark and dangerous streets alone.

=== Morality ===
The Jago has a warped morality. The Ropers are despised for being clean, sober and industrious. Viciousness and dishonesty is respected and the only real sin is that of informing. An inverted hierarchy of criminality and brutality means that a child of the Jago aspires ultimately to joining the ranks of the High Mob, the most successful criminals.

=== Environment ===
The reader is forced to consider the extent to which such an environment suffocates all hope of virtue, self-development and decency. We see that despite the best efforts of Father Sturt and Dicky himself, the boy is dragged back from hope of a respectable future into a life of crime that is nasty, brutish and short. Kiddo Cook's success in elevating himself and escaping the Jago is depicted as exceptional.

=== Cleanliness ===
With the inverted snobbery prevalent in the Jago, dirt is good and cleanliness resented. It is clear that the overcrowded rooms in which the tenants live are filthy, airless and without running water. Clothes are few and, like the bodies they adorn, are unlikely to be washed often, if at all. It is suggested that there is a correlation between the cleanliness of the body with that of the mind and soul.

== In popular culture ==
The book and author were used as a plot point in a 1991 episode of Rumpole of the Bailey, "Rumpole for the Prosecution".

The Kaiser Chiefs released the song "Child of the Jago" on their 2012 album The Future Is Medieval.

A new play 'A Child of the Jago' based on Arthur Morrison's novel was written and produced by Lights of London Productions for performance in 2015/2016

Referenced by Jack London in his book "The People of the Abyss", based on his own time spent living in the East End of London.
