= The Dorrington Deed-Box =

1897 collection of short stories

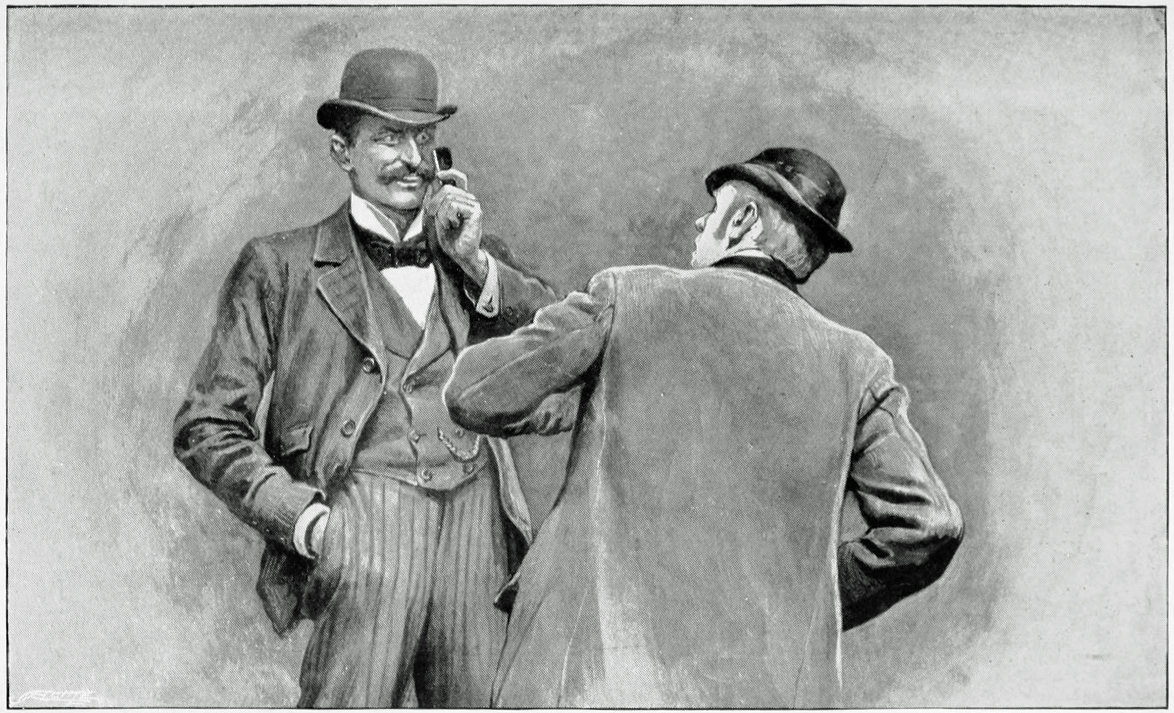
- An illustration of Horace Dorrington from The Dorrington Deed-Box
- Author: Arthur Morrison
- Language: English
- Genre: Crime
- Publication date: 1897
- Publication place: United Kingdom
- Media type: Print
- Text: The Dorrington Deed-Box at Wikisource

The Dorrington Deed-Box is a collection of short stories by the British writer Arthur Morrison published in 1897. It contains six stories featuring cases of the unscrupulous London-based private detective Horace Dorrington, told from the viewpoint of one his clients and potential victims, James Rigby.

It was part of a general boom of detective stories in the wake of Arthur Conan Doyle's creation of Sherlock Holmes. Morrison had previously written stories about an honest private detective Martin Hewitt, but with Dorrington he created a more cynical character who does not hesitate to commit armed robbery or murder to suit his ends.

== Stories ==
1) The Narrative of Mr. James Rigby
2) The Case of Janissary
3) The Case of the "Mirror of Portugal"
4) The Affair of the "Avalanche Bicycle and Tyre Co., Limited"
5) The Case of Mr. Loftus Deacon
6) Old Cater's Money

== Adaptation ==
The 1970s British television series The Rivals of Sherlock Holmes featured two episodes based on Dorrington stories, with Peter Vaughan portraying the detective.

== Bibliography ==
- Clarke, Clare. Late Victorian Crime Fiction in the Shadows of Sherlock. Springer, 2014.
