= Horace Newte =

English playwright, novelist and columnist

Horace Wykeham Can Newte, English playwright, novelist and columnist, was born at Melksham, Wiltshire in 1870. The Newte family, with somewhat of a roaming history, returned to London living at Hammersmith just as London's suburbs were swelling with new housing and new railways. These subjects were to feature in Newte's popular novels. He was educated at Christ's Hospital. His first play, a comedietta, was performed in 1889 as a fundraiser for the Iffley Hall, Hammersmith.

The first of Newte's published novels was The Master Beast: being a true account of the ruthless tyranny inflicted on the British people by socialism 1888-2020 (1907), a novel indicative of Newte's distastes and his enmity to contemporaries such as George Bernard Shaw who identified themselves as Socialists. Some of Newte's other novels inclined towards a 'romantic' form; one such title was his A Young Lady: a study in selectness (1913). Other novels had singular plots, including the examples of The Home of the Seven Devils (1913), in which a Catholic friar is required by his Order to renounce his vows, and Calico Jack (1910), a study of the murky aspects of life in the music halls. Sparrows (1909), perhaps one of his most famous and popular romance titles, was made into a film in the Netherlands and entitled "Vogelvrij". The story, whilst tracing the life and loves of the daughter of a ruined army officer, gives considerable attention to the living-in arrangements suffered by Edwardian shop girls. His last play, A Stroke of Business, jointly written with his Loughton neighbour and friend, Arthur Morrison, was performed in 1907.

In the 1920s and 1930s, Newte's output was predominately of journalism. His penultimate novel, Whither? A story of the drift age (1922) and his final novel, House Sinister (1930) were produced eight years apart. Newte became a regular contributor for the Daily Mirror and various provincial newspapers. His articles were characterised by his objections to the numerous aspects of contemporary life of which he disapproved.

He married Vera Von [sic] Rasch in 1898. Moving from west London to Essex, they lived in a variety of ancient houses including Moat Farm at Upminster Common, and Alderton Hall in Loughton. They had one child, a daughter, who died in infancy. The couple divorced in 1916. Thereafter, Newte lived a peripatetic life in hotels. Horace Newte died in Surrey on Christmas Day 1949.

Newte's stature as a popular author was recognised in an obituary to him in The Times on 31 December 1949. Currently, his fiction has a specialist following in those interested in Edwardian popular novels. A major study referencing Horace Newte's extensive authorial portfolio, his and his wife's ancestral connections to notable historical characters, and their connections to places in London and Essex, was completed by Imogen P. Gray and published in 2017.
