= Nicola Owen =

Sufferer from PMS prosecuted for arson

Nicola Jane Owen
- Born: Nicola Jane Owen; 22 June 1960 (age 66); Bexleyheath, Kent United Kingdom
- Other name: Nikki J.
- Occupations: Therapist, keynote speaker and Founder of The Healing Hub
- Known for: PMS defence in arson case
- Children: Rose Stacey Bolam
- Parent(s): Edward William Owen and Pamela Joan Owen
- Relatives: Sally Ann Layne McInnes (sister)and Jonathan Owen (brother)
- Website: www.nikkijowen.com Www.thehealinghub.uk

Nicola Jane Owen ("Nikki") was a sufferer from premenstrual syndrome (PMS) who was prosecuted for arson endangering life and attempting to kill her mother at the Old Bailey but made legal history on 22 December 1978 by successfully using her condition as a defence. Pioneering research doctor Katharina Dalton testified as an expert witness.

As a result of this trauma she developed tools and resources in attempt to help people to better manage stress and anxiety. The Healing Hub App (founded in 2020) is the result of three decades of tools and techniques pioneered by Owen who claims to have successfully treated thousands of individuals combining breath-work, sound therapy, neuro-linguistic programming and hypnosis.

Many of the techniques used by Nicola and The Healing Hub are based on NLP (Neurolinguistic programming).
