= Katharina Dalton =

Author, chiropodist and gynaecologist

- Born: Katharina Dorothea Kuipers; 11 November 1916; London, England
- Died: 17 September 2004 (aged 87); Poole, England
- Other names: Katharina Thompson
- Education: Royal Free Hospital
- Occupation: Gynaecologist
- Employer: University College Hospital
- Known for: Work on premenstrual syndrome
- Title: Dr
- Spouse(s): Wilfred Thompson, Tom Dalton
- Children: 4
- Parent(s): Anna Knoester, Johannes Kuipers

Katharina Dalton née Kuipers (11 November 1916 – 17 September 2004) was a British physician and pioneer in the research of premenstrual stress syndrome (PMS), coining the term, treating many women and testifying as an expert witness in influential court cases.

== Background ==
Katharina Dorothea Kuipers was born in London on 11 November 1916 to parents Anna Knoester and Johannes Kuipers. Johannes Kuipers, a merchant and freemason, died when Dalton was young. Despite her family's financial troubles, Dalton attended the Royal Masonic School for Girls in London. As she grew, she wanted to be a doctor and, after winning a scholarship to the London Foot Hospital, first trained to be a chiropodist.

Dalton married her first husband, Wilfred Thompson, in 1939, but he died in World War II, not long after their son was born. Dalton then decided to change medical speciality, and obtained a medical degree at the Royal Free Hospital. Before graduating, she married Thomas Dalton, with whom she had three more children. Following the death of her husband Thomas in 1992, Katharina retired shortly after in 2000. She lived the rest of her days in Hereford and Poole, England and ultimately died on 17 September 2004.

== Accomplishments ==
Dr. Dalton became involved in the study of PMS in 1948, when, as a pregnant 32-year-old medical student, she realized her monthly migraine headaches had disappeared. Consulting with endocrinologist Dr. Raymond Greene, she concluded that the headaches could be attributed to a deficiency in the hormone progesterone, which drops before menstruation but soars during pregnancy. After further clinical study, Dalton and Greene published the theory in British medical journals in 1953 — first using the term "premenstrual syndrome" or PMS.

Dalton treated numerous women after setting up her own practice and concluded that PMS was a cyclical hormonal illness occurring in the 14 days following ovulation, with the most severe symptoms evident during the final four days before menstruation. In direct conflict with the views of many of her male colleagues, Dalton said the symptoms were more physical than psychological and included migraine headaches, asthma, epilepsy, skin lesions, irritability, fatigue, and depression.

In addition to her patients, she studied teenage schoolgirls, the mothers of abused children and women confined to prison for serious crimes, including murder. For example, she testified as an expert witness at the Old Bailey in the trial of Nicola Owen, who had burnt her parents' house down. Her research showed that during times of severe PMS, students' academic performance dipped and women were more likely to abuse their children or commit crimes. From historic anecdotes, she even concluded that Queen Victoria suffered from PMS, as indicated by reports of her monthly screaming and throwing objects at her husband, Prince Albert.

She is largely credited with developing the use of menstrual charts for the diagnosis of the disorder, and argued that the timing of PMS in women was associated with higher rates of suicide attempts, alcohol abuse and violent crimes.

PMS, Dalton argued, was brought on primarily by deficiencies of progesterone and could be alleviated with hormone therapy. She also believed that the hormone could be used to ease postnatal depression. But today most experts disagree with those findings and instead rely on selective serotonin reuptake inhibitors (SSRI) and other medications for the treatment of PMS.

In her later works, Dalton helped demonstrate that depression and other disorders could be aggravated by PMS, particularly around the last few days of the menstrual cycle or the first days of menstruation. Dalton eventually became the first female president of the general practice section within the Royal Society of Medicine.

Another observation made by Dalton was that some symptoms of PMS, such as hypertension, edema, and albumin in the urine, were predictors of toxaemia during pregnancy. Patients were administered an initial dose of progesterone during early symptoms and given continuous treatment if symptoms were still present. Using progesterone in trials in maternity hospitals, the incidence rate of toxemia dropped from 9 percent to 1 percent.

Dalton refused use of progestins (synthetic progestogens) in treatment as she believed they were the cause of side effects. She preferred bio-identical, or natural progesterone. In addition, Dalton only supported the use of natural progesterone as she claims that only natural progesterone fit progesterone receptors. Most of her treatments used generous doses of progesterone as she believed that there was no unsafe dose, with 400 milligrams via suppository being the minimum dose. Other positive effects of progesterone include increased hair growth and treatment of brain trauma.

After her work on PMS, she turned to postpartum depression (PPD). The large drop in hormone levels after giving birth can cause new mothers to feel symptoms of tiredness, irritability, and depression, similar to PMS. According to Dalton, these symptoms are considered mild, whereas more severe symptoms can include anxiety as well as changes in personality. In addition, she states that approximately three in one thousand new mothers may experience more severe symptoms of PPD referred to as postpartum psychosis. Symptoms of this psychosis may include hallucinations, thoughts of suicide, and even thoughts of killing their newborn child. Dalton suggested using progesterone therapy to prevent this from happening, usually starting after the end of labour. Her proposed therapy was intended to help slow the speed at which the progesterone hormone naturally drops.

Katharina Dalton published many books including: The Menstrual Cycle (1969); Premenstrual Syndrome and Progesterone Therapy (1977); Once a Month: The Original Premenstrual Syndrome Handbook (1978), which became a best seller, and Depression after Childbirth: How to Recognize, Treat, and Prevent Postnatal Depression.

== Personal life ==
After the death of her first husband, Dalton married Tom Dalton, who died in 1992. She had four children. The British MEP Daniel Dalton is her grandson. On 17 September 2004, Dalton died in Poole at the age of 87.
