= Raymond Greene =

British doctor and mountaineer

Charles Raymond Greene (17 April 1901 – 6 December 1982) was a British doctor and an accomplished mountaineer.

== Biography ==
Greene was born in Berkhamsted. He was the older brother of the novelist Graham Greene and the broadcaster and BBC executive Sir Hugh Greene. He was educated at Berkhamsted School, where his father was the headmaster, and he took a degree in physiology at Pembroke College, Oxford. He qualified as a doctor in 1927 and joined a general practice in Oxford.

He developed his interest in mountaineering whilst at school, restarted the Oxford University mountaineering club and climbed extensively in the Alps. In 1931 he joined an expedition to Mount Kamet in the Himalayas led by Frank Smythe (who was also educated at Berkhamsted School). All the climbers reached the summit at over 25,000 feet, then the highest mountain to have been climbed.

He joined the 1933 Everest expedition led by Hugh Ruttledge as senior doctor, chief intellect, and a competent mountaineer of gigantic physique, being over 6 ft 4in. He was selected to attempt the summit, without oxygen, but suffered heart problems at Camp 5 and had to descend. In 1953 when the mountain was finally climbed, it was Greene who made the announcement on the BBC.

During World War II he worked as a doctor with Special Operations Executive (SOE) and as advisor to the armed forces on the effects of high altitude and cold on the human body.

He went on to become an expert in the treatment of thyroid and other endocrine diseases, migraine, and frostbite. His work with Katharina Dalton resulted in the coining of the term "Premenstrual syndrome" and their research into the subject was subsequently used in criminal cases involving women accused of infanticide and other violent crimes. He was Senior Physician at the Royal Northern Hospital and New End Hospital Hampstead. Between 1960 and 1980 he was chairman of Heinemann Medical Books. He was a fellow of the Royal Zoological Society and diagnosed and treated thyroid problems in Guy the Gorilla at the London Zoo. He was also medical advisor to President Charles de Gaulle during his state visit to England in 1960 and was awarded the Legion of Honour of France. His autobiography, Moments of Being, was published in 1974.

== Selected publications ==
- The Practice of Endocrinology (1951)
- Human Hormones (1970)
- Sick Doctors (1971)
- Moments of Being: The Random Recollections of Raymond Greene (1974)
- Current Concepts in Migraine Research (1978)
