= Augustus S. F. X. Van Dusen =

- First appearance: "The Problem of Cell 13"
- Created by: Jacques Futrelle
- Portrayed by: Douglas Wilmer; Paul Rhys; Tony Gardner

In-universe information
- Gender: Male
- Occupation: Scientist, Amateur Detective
- Nationality: American

Professor Augustus S. F. X. Van Dusen, Ph.D., LL.D., F.R.S., M.D., M.D.S. is a fictional character in a series of detective short stories and a novel by Jacques Futrelle, the best known being "The Problem of Cell 13".

== Biography ==
In the stories, Professor Van Dusen solves a variety of different mysteries with his friend and companion, Hutchinson Hatch, reporter of a fictional newspaper called The Daily New Yorker.

The professor is known as "The Thinking Machine", solving problems by the remorseless application of logic. This nickname was given to him after his winning of a match against the fictional chess champion of the day, Tschaikowsky, in a demonstration to show the power of applying pure logic. He was able to win against the reigning champion, having only been taught the game the morning of the match. Many of his titles are actually honorary degrees awarded to him, serving only to amuse the universities and scientific institutions that crown him with those titles.

Van Dusen's catchphrases include, "Two and two always equal four," "Nothing is impossible" and "All things that start must go somewhere."

His first story gives numerous details about his background, physical appearance, and personality:

In appearance he was no less striking than in nomenclature. He was slender with the droop of the student in his thin shoulders and the pallor of a close, sedentary life on his clean-shaven face. His eyes wore a perpetual, forbidding squint—the squint of a man who studies little things—and when they could be seen at all through his thick spectacles, were mere slits of watery blue. But above his eyes was his most striking feature. This was a tall, broad brow, almost abnormal in height and width, crowned by a heavy shock of bushy, yellow hair. All these things conspired to give him a peculiar, almost grotesque, personality.

Professor Van Dusen was remotely German. For generations his ancestors had been noted in the sciences; he was the logical result, the master mind. First and above all he was a logician. At least thirty-five years of the half-century or so of his existence had been devoted exclusively to proving that two and two always equal four, except in unusual cases, where they equal three or five, as the case may be. He stood broadly on the general proposition that all things that start must go somewhere, and was able to bring the concentrated mental force of his forefathers to bear on a given problem.

— "The Problem of Cell 13"

== Bibliography ==
=== Novel ===
- The Chase of the Golden Plate (1906)

=== Short stories ===
First Series

- "The Problem of Cell 13." Boston American, 30 October to 5 November 1905. Van Dusen accepts a challenge to escape from a death row cell within a week, and Hatch publicizes it in the newspaper
- "The Ralston Bank Burglary." Boston American, 6 November to 12 November 1905.
- "The Flaming Phantom." Boston American, 13 November to 19 November 1905. Hatch is sent to investigate a "haunted house" where a flaming ghost chases off any intruders, but he is forced to summon Van Dusen)
- "The Great Auto Mystery." Boston American, 20 November to 26 November 1905. Also published as "The Knife."
- "Kidnapped Baby Blake, Millionaire." Boston American, 27 November to 3 December 1905. Also published as "The Disappearance of Baby Blake."
- "The Mystery of a Studio." Boston American, 4 December to 10 December 1905.
- "The Scarlet Thread." Boston American, 11 December to 17 December 1905.
- "The Man Who Was Lost." Boston American, 18 December to 24 December 1905.
- "The Golden Dagger." Boston American, 25 December to 31 December 1905.
- "The Fatal Cipher." Boston American, 1 January to 7 January 1906.
- "The Mystery of the Grip of Death." Boston American, 8 January to 14 January 1906.

Second Series

- "Problem of Dressing Room 'A.' " Associated Sunday Magazines [e.g. (Minneapolis) Sunday Journal], 2 September 1906. (The original magazine publication also featured an introductory vignette, "The Thinking Machine.")
- "Problem of the Motor Boat." Associated Sunday Magazines, 9 September 1906.
- "A Piece of String." Associated Sunday Magazines, 16 September 1906
- "Problem of the Crystal Gazer." Associated Sunday Magazines, 23 September 1906.
- "Problem of the Roswell Tiara." Associated Sunday Magazines, 30 September 1906.
- "Problem of the Lost Radium." Associated Sunday Magazines, 7 October 1906. The story takes place in a laboratory at the fictional "Yarvard University", named for Yale and Harvard).
- "The Problem of the Opera Box." Associated Sunday Magazines, 14 October 1906
- "Problem of the Missing Necklace." Associated Sunday Magazines, 21 October 1906.
- "Problem of the Green Eyed Monster." Associated Sunday Magazines, 28 October 1906.
- "Problem of the Perfect Alibi." Associated Sunday Magazines, 4 November 1906. Also published as "His Perfect Alibi."
- "Problem of the Phantom Auto." Associated Sunday Magazines, 11 November 1906. Also published as "The Phantom Motor."
- "The Haunted Bell." The Saturday Evening Post, 17 November 1906
- "Problem of the Stolen Bank Notes." Associated Sunday Magazines, 18 November 1906. Also published as The Brown Coat.
- "Problem of the Superfluous Finger." Associated Sunday Magazines, 25 November 1906. A doctor comes to Van Dusen with an ethical quandary: a woman wants a perfectly good little finger amputated, but won't say why.

Third Series

- "Problem of the Knotted Cord." Associated Sunday Magazines, 20 January 1907. (The original magazine publication also featured an introductory vignette, "My First Experience with the Great Logician.")
- "Problem of the Souvenir Cards." Associated Sunday Magazines, 3 February 1907
- "Problem of the Stolen Rubens." Associated Sunday Magazines, 17 February 1907
- "Problem of the Three Overcoats." Associated Sunday Magazines, 3 March 1907
- "Problem of the Organ Grinder." Associated Sunday Magazines, 17 March 1907
- "Problem of the Hidden Million." Associated Sunday Magazines, 31 March 1907
- "Problem of the Auto Cab." Associated Sunday Newspapers, 14 April 1907
- "Problem of the Private Compartment." Associated Sunday Newspapers, 28 April 1907
- "Problem of the Cross Mark." Associated Sunday Magazines, 12 May 1907
- "Problem of the Ghost Woman." Associated Sunday Newspapers, 26 May 1907
- "The Silver Box." Associated Sunday Newspapers, 9 June 1907. Also published as "The Leak." A businessman asks Van Dusen's help when his industrial secrets are instantly leaked to a competitor.
- "Problem of Convict No. 97." Associated Sunday Newspapers, 23 June 1907
- "Problem of the Deserted House." Associated Sunday Magazines, 7 July 1907
- "Problem of the Red Rose." Associated Sunday Magazines, 21 July 1907
- "Problem of The Vanishing Man." Associated Sunday Magazines, 11 August 1907
- "Problem of the Broken Bracelet." Associated Sunday Magazines, 8 September 1907
- "Problem of the Interrupted Wireless." Associated Sunday Magazines, 3 November 1907.
- "The Grinning God: Part 2: The House That Was." Associated Sunday Magazines, 1 December 1907. Part 1, "Wraiths of the Storm," was written by Futrelle's wife May.

Fourth Series Cut short by Futrelle's death on the Titanic.

- "The Mystery of Prince Otto." Cassell's Magazine of Fiction, July 1912. Also published as "Five Millions by Wireless."
- "The Tragedy of the Life Raft." Popular Magazine, 1 August 1912
- "The Case of the Scientific Murderer." Popular Magazine, 1 September 1912. Revised as "The Case of the Mysterious Weapon." Ellery Queen's Mystery Magazine, October 1950
- "The Jackdaw." Popular Magazine, 15 September 1912. Also published as "The Jackdaw Girl."

== Collections ==
- The Thinking Machine (1907)
  - Contains "The Problem of Cell 13," "The Scarlet Thread," "The Man Who Was Lost," "The Great Auto Mystery," "The Flaming Phantom," "The Ralston Bank Burglary," and "The Mystery of a Studio."
- The Thinking Machine on the Case (1908)
  - Contains "The Thinking Machine," "The Motor Boat," "Dressing Room A," "The Crystal Gazer," "The Interrupted Wireless," "The Roswell Tiara," "The Lost Radium," "The Green-Eyed Monster," "The Opera Box," "The Missing Necklace," "The Phantom Motor," "The Brown Coat," "His Perfect Alibi," and "The Superfluous Finger."
- Best "Thinking Machine" Detective Stories (1973), edited by E. F. Bleiler
  - Contains "The Problem of Cell 13," "The Crystal Gazer," "The Scarlet Thread," "The Flaming Phantom," "The Problem of the Stolen Rubens," "The Missing Necklace," "The Phantom Motor," "The Brown Coat," "His Perfect Alibi," "The Lost Radium," "Kidnapped Baby Blake, Millionaire," and "The Fatal Cipher."
- Great Cases of the "Thinking Machine" (1976), edited by E. F. Bleiler
  - Contains "The Silver Box," "The Superfluous Finger," "The Motor Boat," "The Interrupted Wireless," "The Three Overcoats," "The Problem of the Hidden Million," "The Problem of the Broken Bracelet," "The Problem of the Cross Mark," "The Problem of the Souvenir Cards," "The Problem of the Auto Cab," "The Haunted Bell," "The Roswell Tiara," and "The Problem of the Vanishing Man."
- Jacques Futrelle's Thinking Machine (2003), edited by Harlan Ellison
  - Contains "The Thinking Machine," "My First Experience with the Great Logician," "Dressing Room A," "The Problem of Cell 13," "The Phantom Motor," "The Mystery of the Grip of Death," "The Problem of the Hidden Million," "The Ralston Bank Burglary," "The Problem of the Auto Cab," "The Silver Box," "The Jackdaw Girl," "The Brown Coat," "The Problem of the Stolen Rubens," "The Fatal Cipher," "The Superfluous Finger," "The Motor Boat," "The Problem of the Broken Bracelet," "The Problem of the Cross Mark," "The Problem of the Red Rose," "The Man Who Was Lost," "A Piece of String," and "The Problem of the Deserted House."

"The Golden Dagger," "The Problem of the Knotted Cord," "The Problem of the Organ Grinder," "The Problem of the Private Compartment," "The Problem of the Ghost Woman," "The Problem of Convict No. 97," and "Five Millions by Wireless" have never been reprinted in book form. "The Grinning God," "The Case of the Scientific Murderer," and "The Tragedy of the Life Raft" have been reprinted only in magazines and anthologies.

== In other media ==
=== Television ===
The story "The Problem of Cell 13" was broadcast as "The Problem of Cell Block 13" on the American TV series Kraft Mystery Theater in 1962, with actor Claude Dauphin as the van Dusen character (but named Lowell in the episode). The program also featured Philip Pine and Vic Perrin.

The professor appeared in two episodes of the 1970s Thames Television series The Rivals of Sherlock Holmes. Douglas Wilmer portrayed Van Dusen in "Cell 13" and "The Superfluous Finger." The 1981 Australian Broadcasting Commission series Detective dramatised "The Brown Coat" with John Hannan as Dusen.

=== Radio ===
Between 1978 and 1999 the German radio station RIAS produced and broadcast 79 radio plays based on the character. A few of them were based on original stories by Futrelle, but most of the scripts were new creations by German author Michael Koser. The role of Hutchinson Hatch is a lot more prominent in the radio plays than it was in the original; Hatch was made into the fictional narrator in the radio version. The series has been revived in 2015 with 37 new cases available via CD and downloads. Since 2010, the old radio plays are being remastered and made available on CD with comments by Koser, director Rainer Clute and former cast members.

In 2011, the BBC Radio 4 series The Rivals featured Paul Rhys as Professor Van Dusen in Chris Harrald's adaptation of "The Problem of Cell 13", which was directed by Sasha Yevtushenko. He returned for the first episode of the second series in 2013, in Chris Harrald's adaptation of "The Problem of the Superfluous Finger", produced by Liz Webb. In the fourth episode of the fourth series in 2016, "The Mystery of the Scarlet Thread", Van Dusen was played by Tony Gardner.

=== Comics ===
In 2013, the character appeared in Alan Moore and Kevin O'Neill's graphic novel Nemo: Heart of Ice; the character aids explorer Janni Nemo in 1925 when she encounters H. P. Lovecraft's Elder Gods in Antarctica. He returns in The League of Extraordinary Gentlemen, Volume IV: The Tempest, the final part of the series; set in 2010. He has been resurrected as a sentient A.I., becoming a literal 'thinking machine.'

== Legacy ==
Gene Weingarten, twice Pulitzer Prize–winning journalist at The Washington Post, named his MacBook Pro "Augustus Van Dusen" after the character.
