= Arthur Morrison =

English novelist and art collector (1863–1945)

Arthur G. Morrison
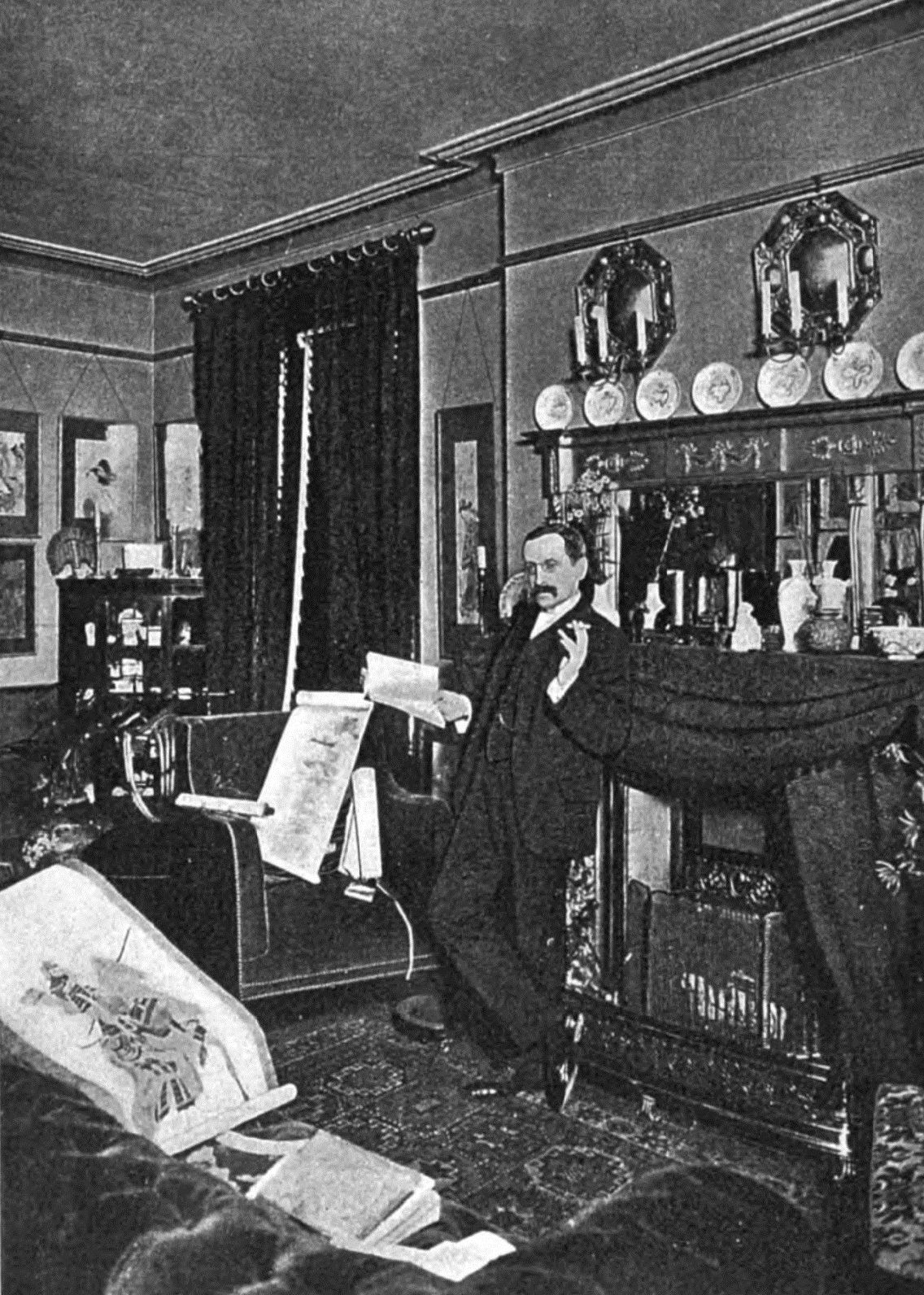
- Morrison (no later than 1903)
- Born: 1 November 1863; Poplar, London, England
- Died: 4 December 1945 (aged 82); Chalfont St Peter, Buckinghamshire, England
- Occupations: Writer, journalist, art writer, art collector
- Spouse: Elizabeth Thatcher
- Children: Guy Morrison
- Writing career
- Subjects: Detective fiction, working-class life
- Notable work: A Child of the Jago
- Literary movement: Literary realism

Arthur George Morrison (1 November 1863 – 4 December 1945) was an English writer and journalist known for realistic novels, for stories about working-class life in the East End of London, and for detective stories featuring a specific detective, Martin Hewitt. He also collected Japanese art and published several works on the subject. Much of his collection entered the British Museum, through purchase and bequest. Morrison's best known work of fiction is his novel A Child of the Jago (1896).

== Early life ==
Morrison was born on 1 November 1863 in suburban Poplar. His father George was an engine fitter at the London Docks in Wapping, who died in 1871 of tuberculosis, leaving his wife Jane with Arthur and two other children. Arthur spent his youth in the East End. In 1879 he began work as an office boy in the Architect's Department of the London School Board. He later remembered frequenting used bookstores in Whitechapel Road about this time. In 1880 Arthur's mother took over a shop in Grundy Street. Morrison published his first work, a humorous poem, in the magazine Cycling in 1880, and took up cycling and boxing. He continued to publish in various cycling journals.

== Career ==
In 1885 Morrison placed his first serious journalism in the newspaper The Globe. After working his way up to the rank of third-class clerk, he was appointed in 1886 to a job at the People's Palace in Mile End. In 1888 he gained reading privileges at the British Museum and published a collection of 13 sketches, Cockney Corner, describing life and conditions in several London districts, including Soho, Whitechapel and Bow Street. In 1889 he became an editor of the paper Palace Journal, reprinting some of his Cockney Corner sketches there and commenting on books and other matters, including life for London's poor.

In 1890 Morrison left that job for the editorial staff of The Globe and moved to lodgings in the Strand. In 1891 his first book appeared, The Shadows Around Us, a collection of 15 supernatural stories. This was not reissued till 2016, by Ulwencreutz Media. In October 1891 his short story A Street was published in Macmillan's Magazine. In 1892 he collaborated with the illustrator J. A. Sheppard on a collection of animal sketches, one entitled My Neighbours' Dogs being for The Strand Magazine. Later that year he married Elizabeth Thatcher at Forest Gate. He befriended the writer and editor William Ernest Henley and supplied stories of working-class life for Henley's National Observer between 1892 and 1894. His son Guy Morrison was born in 1893.

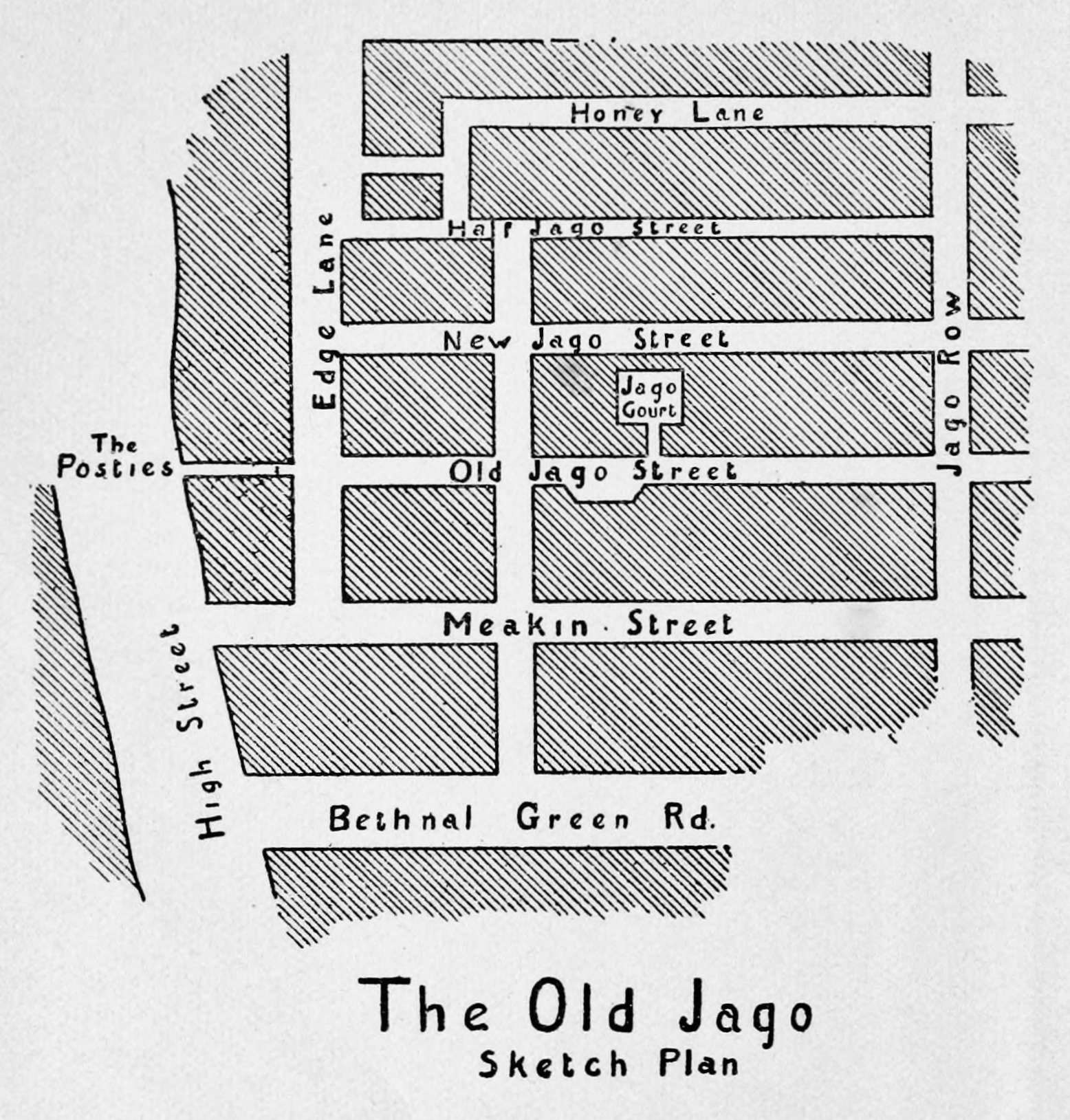
A sketch of the Old Jago from the first American edition of A Child of the Jago, 1896

In 1894 Morrison published his first detective story to feature the detective Martin Hewitt. In November came a short story collection, Tales of Mean Streets, dedicated to Henley. This was reviewed in 1896 in America by Jacob Riis. Morrison later said that the work was publicly banned. Reviewers of the collection objected to his story Lizerunt, causing Morrison to write a response in 1895. Later in 1894 he published Martin Hewitt, Investigator. In 1895 he was invited by writer and clergyman Reverend A. O. M. Jay to visit the Old Nichol rookery. Morrison continued to show interest in Japanese art, to which he was introduced by a friend in 1890. Morrison began writing his novel A Child of the Jago in early 1896. Brought out that November by Henley, it details living conditions in the East End, including the permeation of violence into everyday life, in a barely fictionalised account of life in the Old Nichol Street Rookery. He also published The Adventures of Martin Hewitt in 1896. A second edition of A Child of the Jago appeared in 1897.

In 1897 Morrison issued six short stories covering the exploits of Horace Dorrington. Unlike Martin Hewitt, Dorrington, as one critic put it, was a "low-key, realistic, lower-class answer to Sherlock Holmes". He was noted as "a respected but deeply corrupt private detective," "a cheerfully unrepentant sociopath who is willing to stoop to theft, blackmail, fraud or cold-blooded murder to make a dishonest penny." The stories were collected in The Dorrington Deed-Box, also published in 1897.

In 1899 Morrison published To London Town as the final instalment of a trilogy including Tales of Mean Streets and A Child of the Jago. His Cunning Murrell was published in 1900, followed by The Hole in the Wall in 1902. He continued to issue a wide variety of work through the 1900s, including short story collections, one-act plays and articles on Japanese art. In 1906 he sold a collection of Japanese woodcuts to the British Museum. He also completed a play in collaboration with a neighbour, Horace Newte.

Morrison lived and wrote successively at Chingford and Loughton.

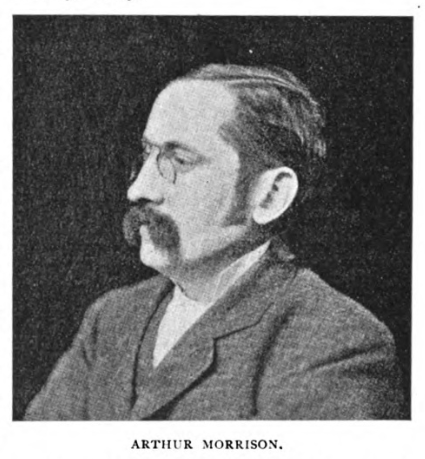
Photo of Morrison in March 1895 edition of The Bookman (New York City)

== Later life ==
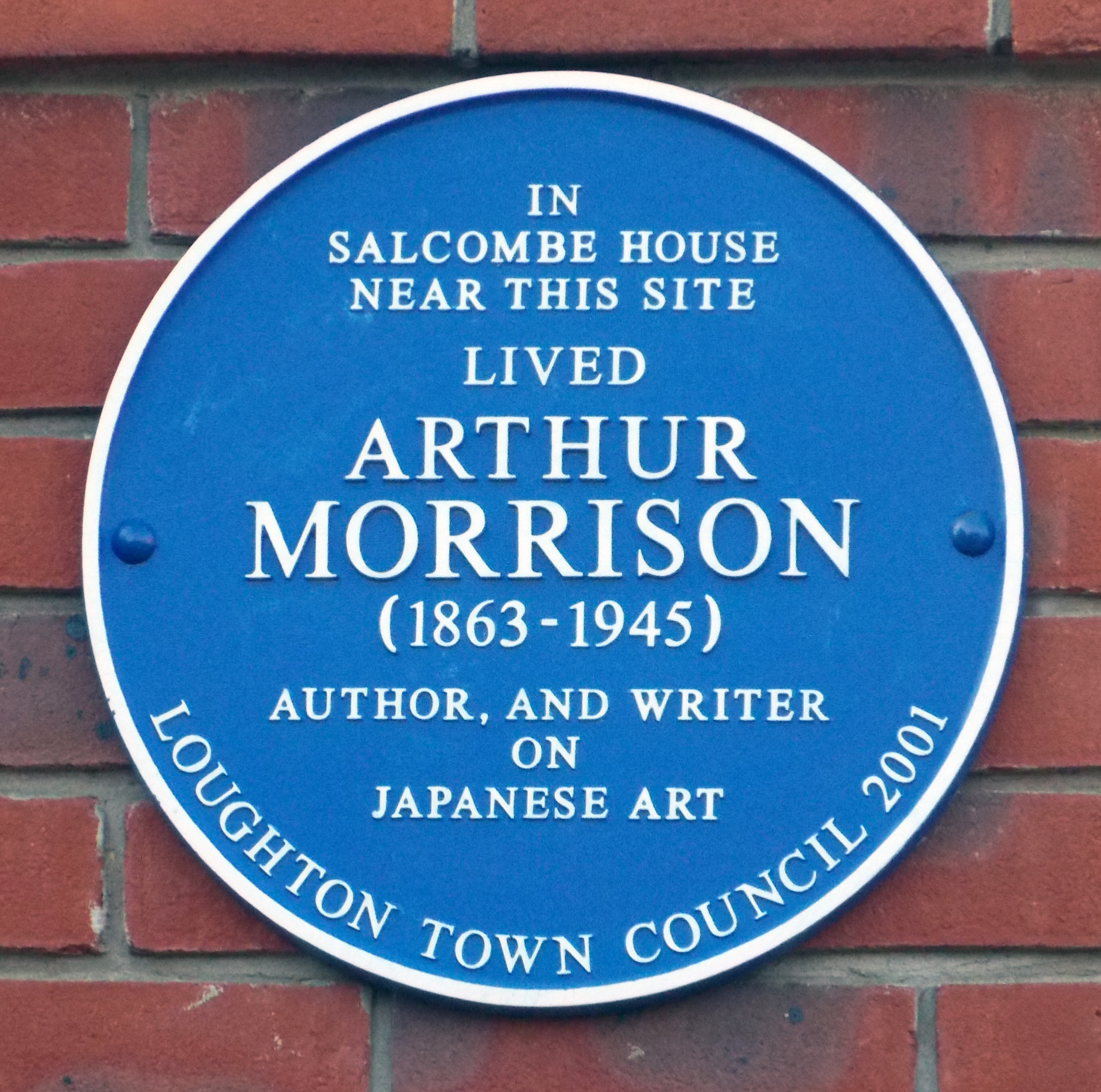
Arthur Morrison blue plaque, High Road, Loughton

In 1906 Morrison donated some 1,800 Japanese woodblock prints to the British Museum. In 1911 he presented an authoritative work, The Painters of Japan, illustrated with paintings from his own collection. A sixth edition of A Child of the Jago came out the same year. In 1913 he retired from journalistic work, moving to a home in High Beach in Epping Forest. The same year Morrison sold his collection of Japanese paintings to Sir William Gwynne-Evans for £4,000, who donated it to the British Museum. On 7 January 1914, in King's Hall, Covent Garden, Morrison, W. W. Jacobs, and Hilaire Belloc were among the members of the jury in the mock trial of John Jasper for the murder of Edwin Drood. At this all-star event, arranged by The Dickens Fellowship, G. K. Chesterton was Judge and George Bernard Shaw appeared as foreman of the jury. Morrison's son Guy joined the army in 1914 to serve in World War I. In 1915 Morrison became a special constable in Essex and was credited with reporting news of the first Zeppelin raid on London. Meanwhile, he continued to publish works on art. In 1921 Guy Morrison died of malaria. Morrison was elected as a member of the Royal Society of Literature in 1924.

In 1930 Morrison moved to his last home, in Chalfont St Peter, Buckinghamshire. In 1933 he published a short story collection, Fiddle o' Dreams and More. In 1935 he was elected to the Council of the Royal Society of Literature.

Morrison died in 1945, leaving in his will his collection of Japanese paintings, prints and ceramics to the British Museum. He also directed that his library be sold and his private papers burned.

== Legacy ==
Morrison's 1903 novel, The Hole in the Wall, was adapted into a BBC TV series in 1972, starring Joseph O'Conor, Peter Bayliss and Queenie Watts.

The Arthur Morrison Society, formed in 2007, began with a public reading by Morrison's grave, followed by a talk by Stan Newens, who later wrote a book about Morrison. Since then, the Morrison Society has held talks and other events as part of the Loughton Festival, including a talk by Tim Clark of the British Museum about Morrison's Japanese art collection. There is a blue plaque dedicated to him near the site of his Loughton house, Salcombe Lodge. On 28 April 2019, actor Robert Crighton gave a reading of two of Morrison's detective stories at Loughton Baptist Church, a stone's throw from where Salcombe Lodge once stood.

== Bibliography ==
=== Fiction ===
- The Shadows Around Us (1891)
- Tales of Mean Streets (1894)
- Martin Hewitt, Investigator (1894)
- Zig-Zags at the Zoo (1894)
- The Chronicles of Martin Hewitt (1895)
- The Adventures of Martin Hewitt (1896)
- A Child of the Jago (1896)
- The Dorrington Deed-Box (1897)
- To London Town (1899)
- Cunning Murrell (1900)
- The Hole in the Wall (1902)
- The Red Triangle; Being Some Further Adventures of Martin Hewitt, Investigator (1903)
- The Green Eye of Goona - The Green Diamond (US title) (1904)
- Divers Vanities (1905)
- Green Ginger (1909)
- Short Stories of Today and Yesterday (1929)
- Fiddle o'Dreams and More (1933)

=== Other ===
- The Painters Of Japan (1911)

== Sources ==
- Miles, Peter (2012). "A Chronology of Arthur Morrison". A Child of the Jago. Oxford University Press. ISBN 978-0-19-960551-4.
