= Balduin Groller =

Austrian author (1848-1916)

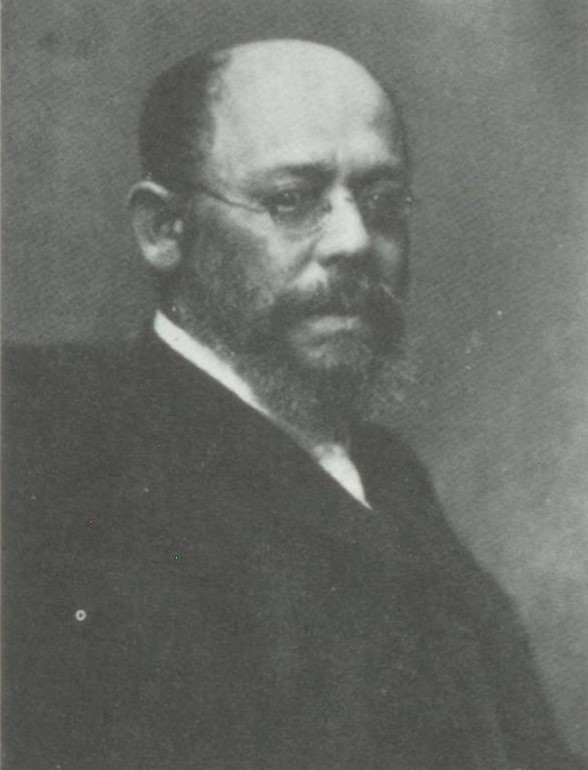
- Born: Adalbert Goldscheider; 5 September 1848; Arad, Austrian Empire
- Died: 22 March 1916 (aged 67); Vienna, Austria-Hungary
- Occupations: Journalist, author
- Writing career
- Notable work: Dagobert Trostler series

Adalbert Goldscheider (5 September 1848 – 22 March 1916), better known by his pseudonym Balduin Groller, was an Austrian journalist and author as well as the founder of the Austrian Olympic Committee.

== Life ==
Balduin Groller spent his childhood between his birthplace of Arad and Dresden. (During his lifetime, the former city, now in Romania, was part of the Austrian Empire; while the latter, today part of Germany, was the capital of the Kingdom of Saxony.) He studied philosophy and law at the University of Vienna where he began his journalistic career by submitting pieces to various newspapers.

Groller became a Freemason at the age of 22. At the age of 23 he founded a newspaper, the Allgemeine Kunstzeitung, in Vienna in 1871 but it went bankrupt after a short time. He later edited Deutsche Schriftstellerzeitung, Neue Illustrierte Zeitung and the Neue Wiener Journal and also worked as a feature writer for various magazines.

In addition to his writing, Groller became the head of the Concordia Press Club as well as a member of the Art Commission of the Austrian Ministry of Culture. On 16 March 1908, Groller was elected the first President of the Central Association for Common Sports Interests, which became the Austrian Olympic Committee.

Groller was very active in the Viennese literary scene and was friends with many of the most important Austrian authors of the late nineteenth and early twentieth centuries, including Auguste Groner and Bertha von Suttner.

== Dagobert Trostler ==
While Groller was a prolific writer, his most famous creation was Dagobert Trostler, a fictional detective known as "The Sherlock Holmes of Vienna." The Dagobert Trostler stories were published in various magazines between about 1895 and 1910. Between 1910 and 1912, these stories were published in a six-volume work called Detective Dagobert's Deeds and Adventures. Very few of these stories were translated into English until 2017 when a collection of Dagobert stories appeared in English as The Adventures of Dagobert Trostler. Ellery Queen ranked Dagobert Trostler as the 44th most important fictional detective in Queen's Quorum: A History of the Detective-crime Short Story.

== Literary works ==
- Young Blood, 1882
- Worldly Things, 1883
- Countess Aranka, 1887
- The Daughter of the Regiment, 1888
- Detective Dagobert's Deeds and Adventures, 1910–1912
