= William James Affleck Shepherd =

English illustrator and cartoonist (1866–1946)

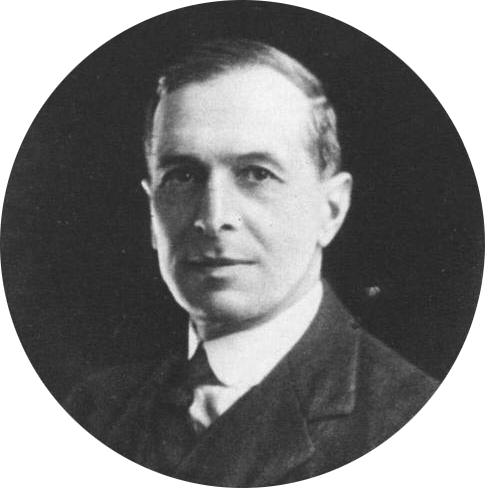
J. A. Shepherd, in 1925 when contributing to The Illustrated London News

William James Affleck Shepherd (1866–1946) was an English illustrator and cartoonist, known mainly for anthropomorphic animal drawings. He rarely used his first forename – most of his works are simply signed "J.A.S."

== Life ==
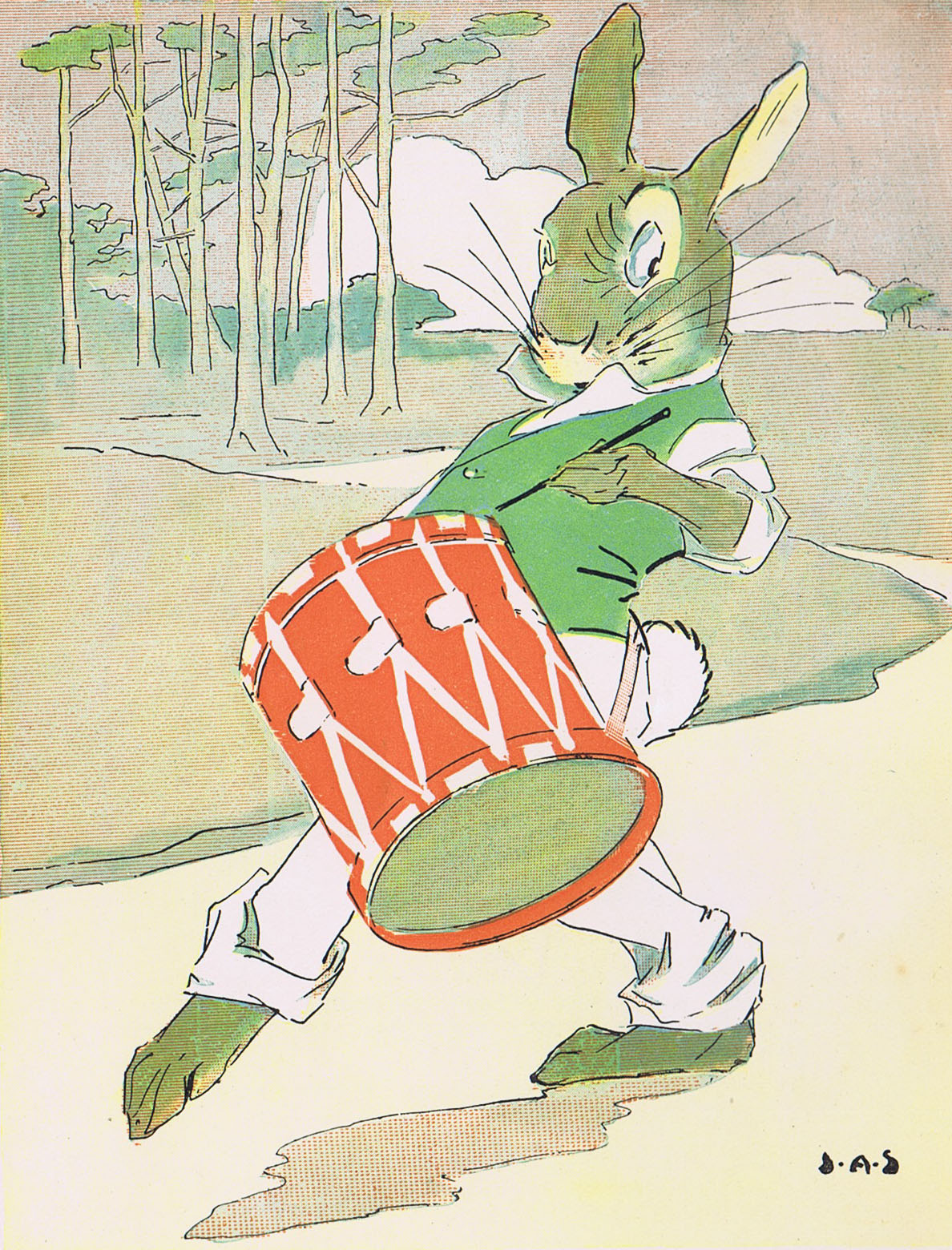
James Affleck Shepherd "Nights with Uncle Remus"

Shepherd, the son of a cigar importer, was born on 29 November 1866 in Pimlico, London and died in Cirencester, Gloucestershire in 1946.

Shepherd did not receive any formal art training. For three years he worked under the direction of Alfred Bryan on the Moonshine satirical magazine. In 1893 he joined the staff of Punch. He also worked for The Strand magazine, the Illustrated London News and other periodicals.

He was a fellow of the Zoological Society and enjoyed the outdoor life. He underlined the importance of animals to him in a remark: "There are only two things I love in my life – my mother and my raven." This was before his marriage in 1897. Shepherd was the maternal grandfather of David Sheppard (6 March 1929 – 5 March 2005), Bishop of Liverpool and a Test cricketer.

== Publications ==
in 1897 Shepherd produced the children's picture book "Zig Zag Fables", which the Disney animator Andreas Deja has cited as an influence. In 1926 "A Frolic around the Zoo" appeared, featuring the adventures of Blinx, a stray cat, and Bunda, an escaped monkey. He illustrated many books and was a contributor to The Rosebud annuals, which were renowned for their illustrations by Louis Wain.
