= Jacques Futrelle =

American mystery writer (1875–1912)

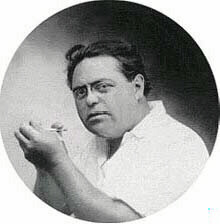
- Born: Jacques Heath Futrelle; April 9, 1875; Pike County, Georgia, US
- Died: April 15, 1912 (aged 37); North Atlantic Ocean
- Occupations: Mystery writer, journalist
- Spouse: May Futrelle (m. 1895)
- Children: 2
- Writing career
- Period: 1905–1912
- Genres: Detective fiction, science fiction

Jacques Heath Futrelle (April 9, 1875 – April 15, 1912) was an American journalist and mystery writer. He is best known for writing short detective stories featuring Professor Augustus S. F. X. Van Dusen, also known as "The Thinking Machine" for his use of logic. Futrelle died in the sinking of the RMS Titanic.

== Career ==
Jacques Heath Futrelle was born on April 9, 1875, in Pike County, Georgia. He worked for the Atlanta Journal, where he began their sports section, the New York Herald, the Boston Post and the Boston American, where, in 1905, his Thinking Machine character appeared in a serialized version of the short story, "The Problem of Cell 13".

Futrelle left the Boston American in 1906 to write novels. He had a harbor-view house built in Scituate, Massachusetts, which he called "Stepping Stones", and spent most of his time there until his death in 1912. His last work, My Lady's Garter, was published posthumously in 1912. His widow inscribed in the book, "To the heroes of the Titanic, I dedicate this my husband's book", under a photo of him.

== Personal life ==
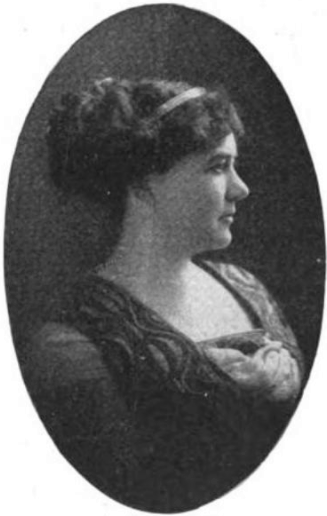
Lily May Futrelle 1912

In 1895, he married fellow writer Lily May Peel with whom he had two children, Virginia and Jacques "John" Jr. His great-grandson is writer David Futrelle.

== Death ==
Returning from Europe aboard the RMS Titanic, Futrelle, a first-class passenger, refused to board a lifeboat during its evacuation, insisting Lily do so instead, to the point of forcing her in. She remembered the last she saw of him: he was smoking a cigarette on deck with John Jacob Astor IV. He perished in the Atlantic and his body was never found. On July 29, 1912, Futrelle's mother, Linnie Futrelle, died in her Georgia home; her death was attributed to grief over the death of her son.

== In popular culture ==
Futrelle is used as the protagonist in Max Allan Collins' disaster series novel The Titanic Murders (1999), about two murders aboard the Titanic.

== Selected works ==
=== Novels ===
- The Chase of the Golden Plate (1906)
- The Simple Case of Susan (1908)
- The Diamond Master (1909) – adapted as a "three-reel photoplay by the Eclair Co." in 1914 and as silent film serials The Diamond Queen (1921) and The Diamond Master (1929)
- Elusive Isabel (1909)
- The High Hand (1911)
- My Lady's Garter (1912)
- Blind Man's Buff (1914)

=== Short story collections ===
- The Thinking Machine (1907)
  - "The Flaming Phantom"
  - "The Great Auto Mystery"
  - "The Man Who Was Lost"
  - "The Mystery of a Studio"
  - "The Problem of Cell 13" (1905)
  - "The Ralston Bank Burglary"
  - "The Scarlet Thread"
- The Thinking Machine on the Case (1908), UK title The Professor on the Case
  - "The Stolen Rubens"

=== Short stories ===
See Augustus S. F. X. Van Dusen and JacquesFutrelle.com for more stories.

- "The Problem of Cell 13" (1905)
- The Gray Ghost (Perth Daily News, 30 September 1905)
- The Man Who Found Kansas (Metropolitan Magazine, April 1906)
- "The Phantom Motor"
- "The Grinning God" (The Sunday Magazine)
  - I. "Wraiths of the Storm", by May Futrelle
  - II. "The House That Was", by Jacques Futrelle

In this literary experiment, The Thinking Machine provides a rational solution to the seemingly impossible and supernatural events of a ghost story written by Mrs. Futrelle.
