= Hugh Greene =

British television executive & journalist (1910–1987)

Sir Hugh Greene KCMG OBE
- Greene in 1968

7th Director-General of the BBC
- In office 1 January 1960 – March 1969
- Preceded by: Sir Ian Jacob
- Succeeded by: Charles Curran

Personal details
- Born: 15 November 1910 Berkhamsted, England
- Died: 19 February 1987 (aged 76) London, England
- Spouses: Helga Mary Guinness (m. 1934; div. 1948) Elaine Shaplen (m. 1951; div. 1969) Tatjana Sais (m. 1970; died 1981) Sarah Mary Manning Grahame (m. 1984)
- Children: 4
- Relatives: Raymond Greene (brother); Graham Greene (brother)
- Education: Berkhamsted School
- Alma mater: Merton College, Oxford
- Occupation: Television executive; journalist

Sir Hugh Carleton Greene KCMG OBE (15 November 1910 – 19 February 1987) was a British television executive and journalist. He was director-general of the BBC from 1960 to 1969.

After working for newspapers in the 1930s, Greene spent most of his later career with the BBC, rising through the managerial ranks of overseas broadcasting and then news for the main domestic channels. He encountered opposition from some politicians and activists opposed to his modernising agenda, but under his leadership the BBC was recognised to be outperforming its commercial rival, ITV, and was awarded a second television channel (BBC 2) by the British government and authorised to introduce colour television to Britain.

After retiring from the BBC, Greene published several books, including a collaboration with his brother, the novelist Graham Greene, and made television programmes both for the BBC and ITV.

== Background ==
Greene was born on 15 November 1910 in Berkhamsted, Hertfordshire. He was the youngest of four sons and the fifth of the six children of Charles Henry Greene, headmaster of Berkhamsted School, and his wife and cousin, Marion Raymond, the daughter of the Rev Carleton Greene (vicar of Great Barford in Bedfordshire). His mother was a cousin of the Scottish novelist Robert Louis Stevenson. Among the couple's other children were novelist Graham Greene, and Raymond Greene, a Doctor of Medicine and a mountaineer.

Hugh Greene was educated at Berkhamsted School and at Merton College, Oxford, where he obtained a second class in classical moderations (1931) and English (1933).

Before his undergraduate years at Merton, Greene had spent some time in Germany. After graduating, he returned there and began his career as a journalist. He worked in Munich for two British publications, the Daily Herald and the New Statesman, and in 1934 he joined the Berlin office of The Daily Telegraph, becoming its chief correspondent in 1938. The writer of his entry in the Dictionary of National Biography, Colin Shaw, said that Greene was deeply influenced for the rest of his life by his first-hand experience of the Nazi regime, "teaching him to hate intolerance and the degradation of character to which the loss of freedom led". He was expelled from Germany in May 1939 in reprisal for the expulsion from London of journalist and Nazi agent, Rudolf Rösel.

The Daily Telegraph sent Greene to Warsaw, but his time there was brief. In September 1939, the Germans invaded Poland and he was forced to leave. As the war spread in Europe he reported from Romania, Bulgaria, Turkey, the Netherlands, Belgium and finally France, returning to Britain in June 1940, narrowly escaping the German army's arrival in Paris. After a few months in the Royal Air Force as a pilot officer in Intelligence, he was released to join the BBC German Service, becoming its news editor. Throughout the war, the BBC remained committed to impartial and accurate reporting to enemy-occupied territories. In 1940, Greene was one of the first to undergo security clearance vetting by MI5 while working at the BBC, for MI5 suspected him to be a communist.

== Early broadcasting career ==
At the end of the war the British government asked Greene to return to Germany as controller of broadcasting in the British-occupied zone. He established a peacetime radio service, Nordwestdeutscher Rundfunk, served as its first director-general and gave it a charter on the lines of the BBC. In 1948, the station was handed over to the German authorities and Greene returned to England. He was appointed head of the BBC's eastern European service in 1949, just before the Russians began to jam its broadcasts. In 1950, he was again seconded for government service, this time as head of emergency information services for the Federation of Malaya, helping to combat the efforts of communist insurgents. Among his assistants was the future prime minister of Singapore, Lee Kwan Yew, who became a close friend.

On his return to London, Greene resumed his work at the BBC. First, in 1952, as assistant controller of overseas services, and then, in 1955, as controller. In 1956, Sir Norman Bottomley, director of administration and deputy to the director-general, Sir Ian Jacob, retired. Greene was appointed to succeed him; Shaw comments that this temporarily distanced him from any direct involvement with programmes, but clearly identified him as the potential successor to Jacob, who was due to retire in 1959.

After two years Greene was appointed to a newly-created post – director of news and current affairs. It was established in the wake of television's rise to overtake radio as the dominant broadcasting medium, and Greene's brief was "to secure overall co-ordination and editorial direction of topical output in both radio and television". In this role Greene encountered resistance to modernisation by key figures in the BBC news division, headed by Tahu Hole. The commercial Independent Television News (ITN), launched in 1955 was strongly outperforming the BBC in innovation, flair and audience numbers. Jacob backed Greene's modernising approach, and moved Hole to be director of administration. Among the reforms introduced by Greene was the abandonment of a restrictive and bureaucratic system for covering party politics. Before the 1959 general election he announced, "We are going to cover the election, nationally and locally, like any other news story – on the basis of news value", putting the BBC on a similar basis to ITN and the press.

== BBC director-general ==
Greene's appointment to succeed Jacob was announced in 1959. It was received with widespread approval by BBC staff, partly because Greene was the first director-general to have risen through the ranks of BBC management, and partly because his transformation of news and current affairs coverage had impressed the programme makers and made them feel valued as they had not felt previously. He assumed the post on 1 January 1960. Early on, Greene abolished the position of director of news and current affairs, and appointed himself editor-in-chief. In that capacity, Shaw writes, he remained "a working journalist capable, when the need arose, of dealing expeditiously with those editorial issues that were referred to him". As director-general he led a modernisation of the BBC, increasing its audience after the creation of a rival commercial ITV television network (the first contractors were on air from September 1955) which had become much more popular than the BBC.

Soon after Greene's appointment, the government set up a committee of inquiry into broadcasting, chaired by the industrialist Sir Harry Pilkington. Greene pressed the BBC's case, arguing that the interests outside television of the commercial franchise holders constituted a conflict of loyalties with their public service obligations, and that the quality of programmes from commercial television was greatly inferior to that of the BBC's. The committee's report was highly favourable to Greene and the BBC, and despite pressure from the commercial television lobby, the government awarded the BBC the proposed third channel and introduction of colour television.

In a short history of the corporation, the BBC says of Greene's tenure, "he encouraged programme-makers to reflect the social changes and attitudes of the Sixties":

After the arrival of That Was The Week That Was in 1962 ... the British Establishment would never be seen in the same light. ... Viewers enjoyed the portrayal of a new breed of gritty policemen in Z-Cars (1962), wept at the plight of the homeless in The Wednesday Play, Cathy Come Home (1966) and were riveted by Doctor Who (1963), Top of the Pops (1964), Horizon (1964), Tomorrow's World (1965) and Dr Kildare, all attracting large audiences. ... Omnibus set a new standard for television arts programmes. (Note: Greene is thought to have directly suggested only two programmes, the American courtroom drama series Perry Mason and the Sunday evening religious feature Songs of Praise.)

Greene was more frank in private:

We are going to use this organisation to change the way the rest of the country thinks. We want them to see stuff they don't like. We don't really care if they complain.

Although under Greene's leadership the BBC caught up with and overtook commercial television in popularity among the British public as a whole, there were dissenting voices. Harold Wilson, who became prime minister in 1964, was less tolerant than his predecessors of the BBC's satire and lack of deference, and Mary Whitehouse, a campaigner who described herself as "an evangelical Christian and moral crusader", accused Greene of being "the devil incarnate" for allowing the broadcast of dramas with sexual content or bad language. (Note: Greene was deeply suspicious of anybody insisting on "family values" as Whitehouse did; it reminded him of Nazi Germany, and he refused to have anything to do with Whitehouse, although his successors were less firm.) Greene ignored Whitehouse's protestations and commissioned a painting of her naked with five breasts for his office, at which he threw darts.

Wilson's hostility was harder to ignore. When the chairman of the BBC, Lord Normanbrook, died in 1967, his successor Lord Hill (hitherto chairman of the BBC's rival, the Independent Television Authority) was appointed reportedly at Wilson's request. Greene at that time held Hill in contempt. If, as was suspected at the time, Wilson's motive was to provoke Greene into resigning, the ploy almost succeeded, but Greene's advisers convinced him that if he resigned the whole board of management of the BBC would resign with him, leaving the corporation "at the mercy of its new master" as one colleague put it.

Greene and Hill established a working relationship that was uneasy but viable. Nonetheless, after a year Greene began to look forward to retirement. After more than eight years in post, he left in March 1969. To make it clear that the decision was his, rather than Hill's, the latter proposed that Greene should become a member of the BBC's board of governors. He did so, and served for two years before resigning, feeling that his presence was inhibiting his successor.

== Later years ==
After he left the post of director general, Greene made some programmes for the BBC and also – causing some disapproval at the BBC – for ITV. He edited several collections of stories about the rivals of Sherlock Holmes, collaborated with his brother Graham on Victorian Villanies (1984) and became chairman of Bodley Head, his brother's publisher. His lifelong hatred of totalitarianism and dictatorship led him to be active in campaigning against the military junta that ruled Greece after the coup of 1967. After civilian rule was reestablished, Greene was adviser to the Greek government on the constitution of broadcasting.

== Personal life ==
Greene was married four times. In October 1934, he married Helga Mary (b. 1916), the daughter of Samuel Guinness, a banker, of London. They had two sons; the couple divorced in 1948. In September 1951, he married Elaine Shaplen (b. 1920), the daughter of Louis Gilbert, an accountant, of New York. They had two sons, and divorced in 1969. In May 1970, Greene married the German actress Tatjana Sais (1910–1981); they had lived together in the late 1940s. She died in 1981, and in December 1984, he married Sarah Mary Manning Grahame (b. 1941), a script supervisor from Australia. There were no children of the third and fourth marriages.

Greene died from cancer in King Edward VII's Hospital, London, on 19 February 1987.

== Honours ==
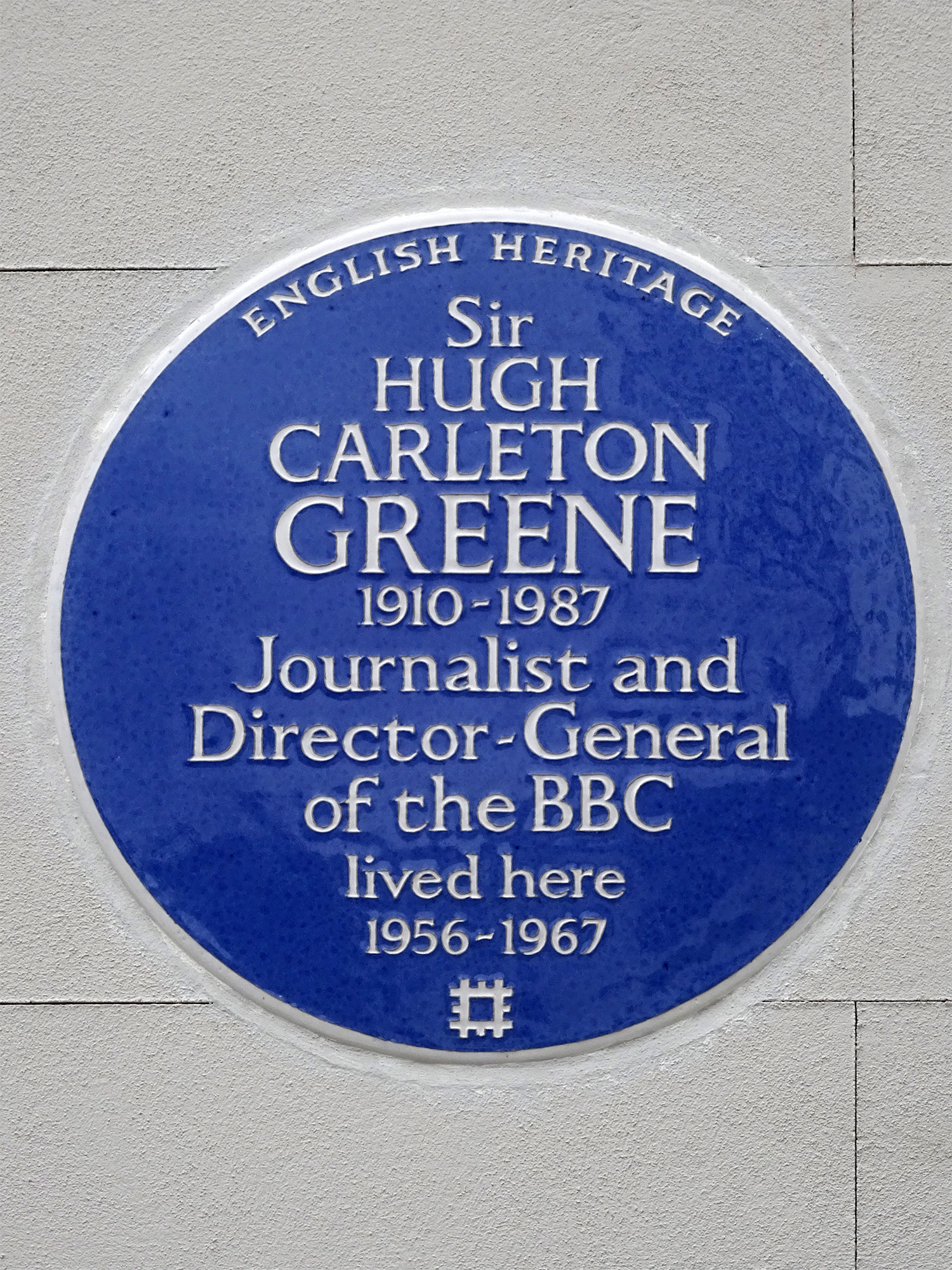
Blue plaque in Addison Avenue in Notting Hill.

Greene was appointed OBE in 1950 and knighted (KCMG) in 1964. He received honorary degrees from the University of East Anglia, the University of York and the Open University. The West German government awarded him the Grand Cross of the Order of Merit in 1977. In 1985 he received the Eduard Rhein Ring of Honour from the German Eduard Rhein Foundation for outstanding work related to the promotion of scientific research and of learning, the arts and culture. The road where the German radio station he helped to organise is located is now named after him (Hugh-Greene-Weg).

== Legacy ==
Greene has been praised as one of the BBC's greatest Director-Generals, with Graham McCann stating:

Greene is actually one of the true giants of the medium, responsible, directly or indirectly, for making possible many of the most courageous, imaginative, innovative and inspirational achievements that the form has ever seen...He was the new man for the new decade, and he knew it. It was time to move on, to stop looking back and start looking forward, and encourage a culture and a society that was starting to refresh itself from within...[he] contributed far more of lasting value to British culture and society than his detractors ever did. He was a man whose commitment was not to cliques or controversies but to what he regarded as the core moral values of any decent community: 'truthfulness, justice, freedom, compassion and tolerance'. At a time when public service broadcasting is in desperate need of a hero, it really ought to shine a light on the one in its own history."

Ian Jones wrote that Greene

"...had the wherewithal to both accommodate and defend exponents of progressive, challenging ideals within the BBC, believing that was simply something the BBC was there to do. If it made mistakes, at least it was trying, experimenting, and moving forwards. Such a precarious – and often preposterous – situation was chiefly possible thanks to Greene’s personality, and not because he was sitting in Broadcasting House drawing up tracts of revolutionary prose...but for all his exuberance, compassion and generosity he trod an often hazardously fine line between triumph and traumatism. Fortunately for him, and for the nation, luck was on his side.

== Publications ==
- The Spy's Bedside Book (ed., with Graham Greene, 1957)
- The Third Floor Front: A View of Broadcasting in the Sixties (1969)
- The Rivals of Sherlock Holmes: Early Detective Stories (ed., 1970)
- Cosmopolitan Crimes: More Rivals of Sherlock Holmes; US edition Foreign Rivals of Sherlock Holmes (ed., 1971)
- The Crooked Counties: Further Rivals of Sherlock Holmes (ed., 1973)
- The American Rivals of Sherlock Holmes (1976)
- The Pirate of the Round Pond and Other Strange Adventure Stories (ed., 1977)
- Victorian Villainies (ed., with Graham Greene, 1984)

Source: Who's Who.

== External sources ==
- Stuart A. Rose Manuscript, Archives, and Rare Book Library

Media offices
Preceded by Sir Ian Jacob; 1952–1959	Director-General of the BBC; 1960–1969	Succeeded by Charles Curran; 1969–1977
