= Sasha Yevtushenko =

British radio drama director

- Born: Aleksandr Yevgenevich Yevtushenko (Александр Евгеньевич Евтушенко); 31 January 1979 (age 46)
- Other names: Alexander Yevtushenko
- Occupation(s): Radio director and producer
- Employer: BBC Radio
- Parents: Yevgeny Yevtushenko (father); Jan Butler (mother)

Alexander "Sasha" Yevgenevich Yevtushenko (born 31 January 1979) is a director and producer of radio dramas for BBC Radio. He is a son of Russian poet Yevgeny Yevtushenko and his third wife, English translator Jan Butler.

In 2016 an adaptation of Mikhail Bulgakov's The Master and Margarita produced by Yevtushenko won the BBC Audio Drama Award in the Best Adaptation category. In 2018, Katie Hims' Black Eyed Girls, which he directed, won the BBC Audio Drama Award for Best Series/Serial.

== Selected works ==
As director:

- The Problem of Cell 13 (2011)
- The Count of Monte Cristo (2012, directed by Jeremy Mortimer and Sasha Yevtushenko)
- Lord of the Flies (2013)
- Do Androids Dream of Electric Sheep? (2014)
- Agamemnon (2014)
- The Furies (2014)
- The Voyage of the Damned (2020, audio adaptation starring Toby Jones, Paul Ritter, Allan Corduner and Philip Glenister. Based upon the book by Gordon Thomas and Max Morgan-Witts. )

As producer:

- The Master and Margarita (2015)
