= Cultural history of the buttocks =

Human sexual psychology relating to the anatomical posterior

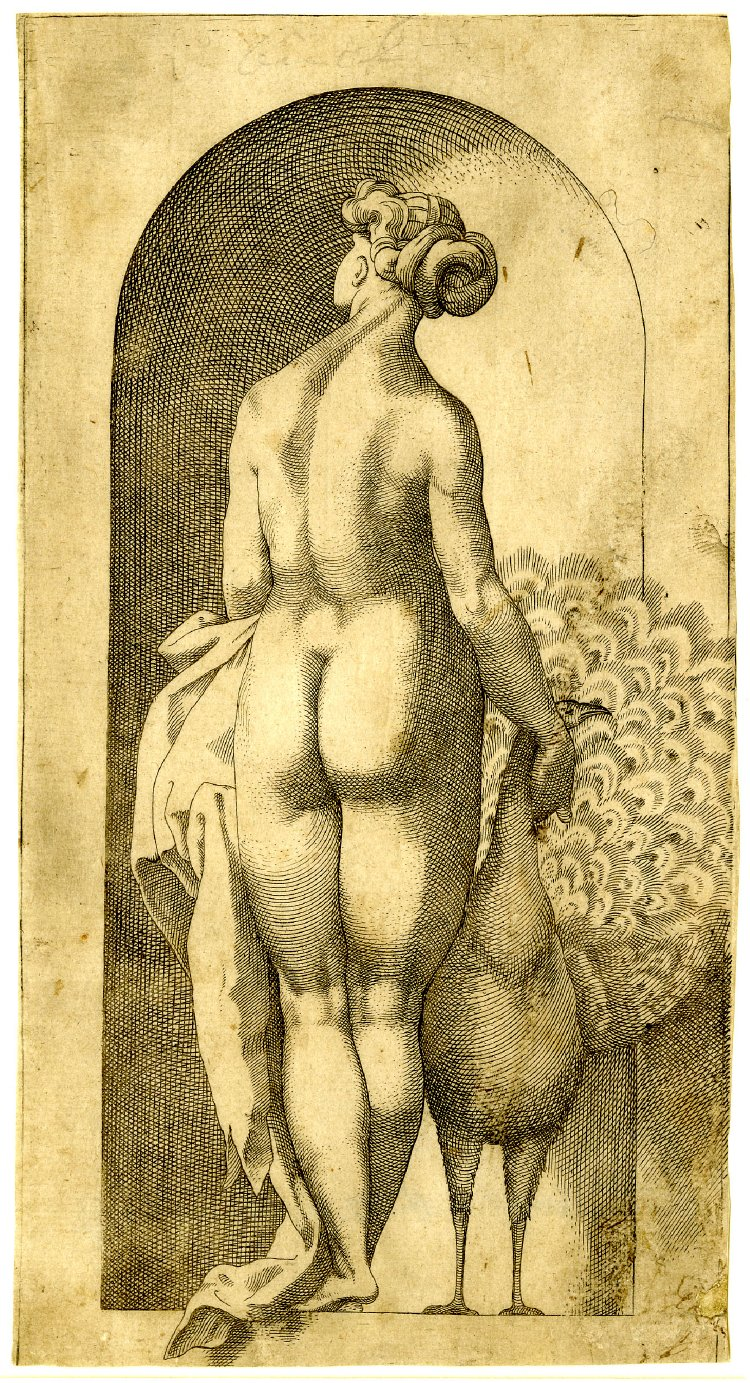
The Mannerist movement was not afraid to exaggerate body proportions for an effect considered attractive; Juno in a niche, engraving by Jacopo Caraglio, probably of a drawing by Rosso Fiorentino, 1526

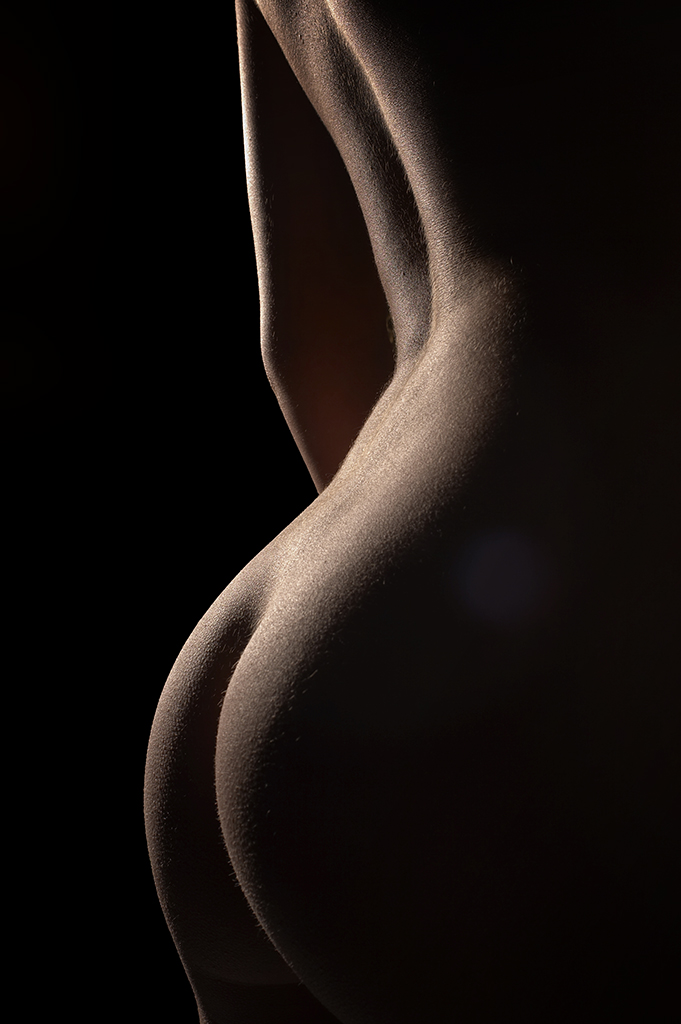
An example of erotic photography that emphasizes the female buttocks

Cultural history of the buttocks has included various art forms as well as a sexualization of the buttocks which has occurred throughout history.

== Evolutionary significance ==
Sexologist Alfred Kinsey has suggested that the buttocks are the primary sexual presentation site in primates. Some anthropologists and sociobiologists believe that breast fetishism derives from the breasts' similarity to buttocks, but instead provide sexual attraction when the body is seen from the front.

In humans, females generally have rounder and fuller buttocks compared to males, caused by estrogen that encourages the body to store fat in the buttocks, hips, and thighs. Testosterone discourages fat storage in these areas. The buttocks in human females thus contain more adipose tissue than in males, especially after puberty. Evolutionary psychologists suggest that rounded buttocks may have evolved as a desirable trait because they provide a visual indication of the woman's youth and fertility. They signal the presence of estrogen and the presence of sufficient fat stores for pregnancy and lactation. Additionally, the buttocks give an indication of the shape and size of the pelvis, which impacts reproductive capability. Since development and pronunciation of the buttocks begins at menarche and declines with age, full buttocks are also a symbol of youth.

Biological anthropologist Helen B. Fisher said that "perhaps, the fleshy, rounded buttocks attracted males during rear-entry intercourse". In a 2017 study, using 3D models and eye-tracking technology, Fisher's claim was tested and was shown that the slight thrusting out of a woman's back influences how attractive others perceive her to be and captures the gaze of both men and women. Bobbi S. Low et al. said that the female buttocks "evolved in the context of females competing for the attention and parental commitment of powerful resource-controlling males" as an "honest display of fat reserves" that could not be confused with another type of tissue, although Tim M. Caro rejected that as being a necessary conclusion, stating that female fatty deposits on the hips improve individual fitness of the female, regardless of sexual selection.

== History ==
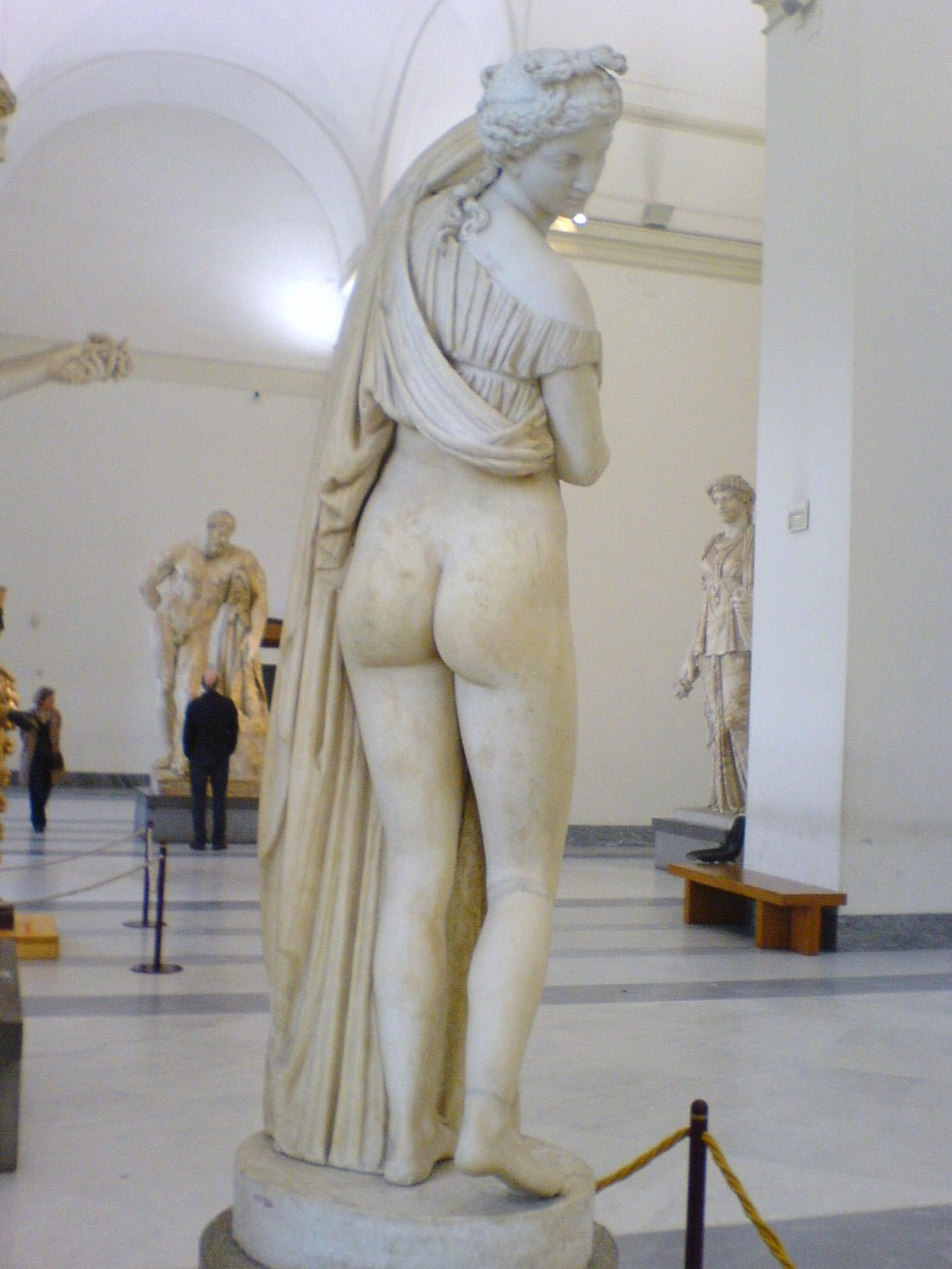
Venus Callipyge, a Roman sculpture (thought to be based on a Greek original) that emphasizes the buttocks

The female buttocks have been a symbol of fertility and beauty since early human history. Statues created as early as 24,000 BC, such as the Venus of Willendorf, have exaggerated buttocks, hips, and thighs.

The erotic beauty of the female buttocks was important to the ancient Greeks, thought to have built such statues as Venus Callipyge (although only a possible Roman copy survives), that emphasize the buttocks. Bare buttocks were also considered erotic in Ming dynasty China, where they were often compared to the bright full moon. Many artists pose models to emphasize the buttocks.

The buttocks have been considered an erogenous zone in Western thought for centuries; the eroticization of the female buttocks was due to their association and closeness to the female reproductive organs. The buttocks are often taboo due to their proximity to the anus and association with the excretory system. The psychoanalyst Sigmund Freud theorized that psychosexual development occurred in three stages – oral, anal, and genital – and that fixation in the anal stage caused anal retentiveness and a lasting focus on eroticization of the anus.

Spanking was prominent in pornography in Victorian Britain with erotica such as Lady Bumtickler's Revels by John Camden Hotten and Exhibition of Female Flagellants by George Cannon being consumed.

In Studies in the Psychology of Sex, published in 1927 and written by British physician and sexual psychologist Havelock Ellis, he describes cultural sexual characteristics of the buttocks. He says:

Thus we find, among most of the peoples of Europe, Asia, and Africa, the chief continents of the world, that the large hips and buttocks of women are commonly regarded as an important feature of beauty. This secondary sexual character represents the most decided structural deviation of the feminine type from the masculine, a deviation demanded by the reproductive function of women, and in the admiration it arouses sexual selection is thus working in a line with natural selection.

He adds that

The European artist frequently seeks to attenuate rather than accentuate the protuberant lines of the feminine hips, and it is noteworthy that the Japanese also regard small hips as beautiful. Nearly everywhere else large hips and buttocks are regarded as a mark of beauty, and the average man is of this opinion even in the most æsthetic countries.

Ellis also claims that corsets and bustles are meant to emphasize the buttocks.

Emphasis on the female buttocks as a sexual characteristic has increased in recent times according to Ray B. Browne, who attributes the change to the popularization of denim jeans:

[E]mphasis on the upper female torso has recently given way to the lower area of the body, specifically the buttocks. Such a change happened quite recently when denim jeans became fashionable. In order to emphasize fit, jeans manufacturers accentuated hips. And after brand name jeans became so popular with the designer's name on the hip pocket, even more accentuation was given to the posterior. The more jeans sales increased, the more ads were used which emphasized the derriere, to such an extent, in fact, that this particular area may eventually surpass breasts as the number one sexual image of the female body.

== Males ==
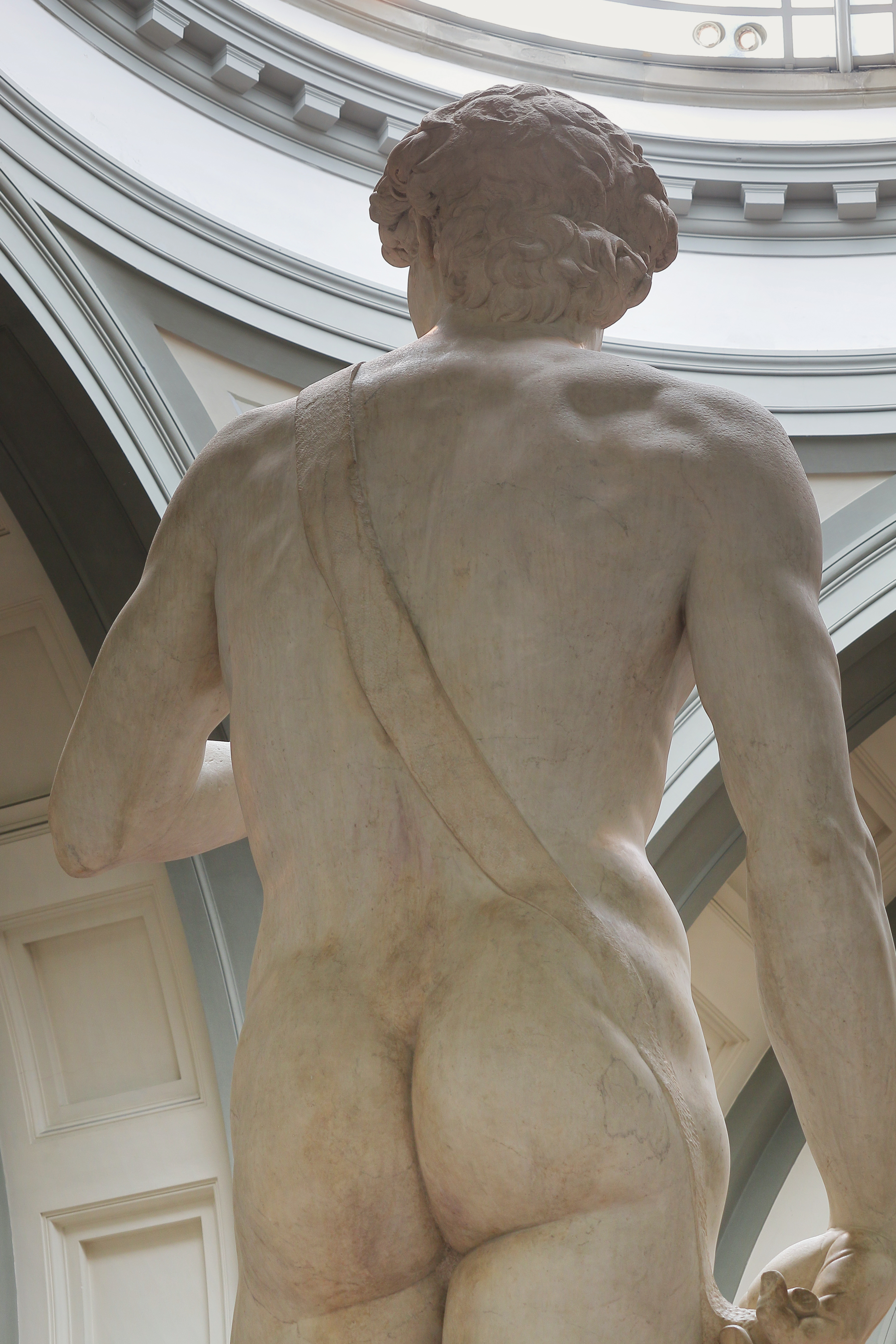
Rear of Michelangelo's David

While female buttocks are often eroticized in heterosexual erotica, men's buttocks are considered erogenous by many women, and are also eroticized in male homosexuality which often centers on anal intercourse. Historically, they are also portrayed in sculpture and other image art with a frequency equalling that of the females.

== Fetishism ==
A buttock fetish or buttock partialism is a condition in which the buttocks become a primary focus of sexual attention. It may be associated with coprophilia, panty fetishism, eproctophilia, and sadomasochistic corporal punishment involving the buttocks. Pygophilia is sexual arousal caused by seeing, playing with or touching a person's buttocks.

== See also ==
- Anal eroticism
- Anal sex
- Awoulaba
- Body worship
- Dimples of Venus
- Gynoid fat distribution
- History of erotic depictions
- History of human sexuality
- Miss Bumbum § Cultural context
- Partialism
- Steatopygia
