= Impact play =

Human sexual practice

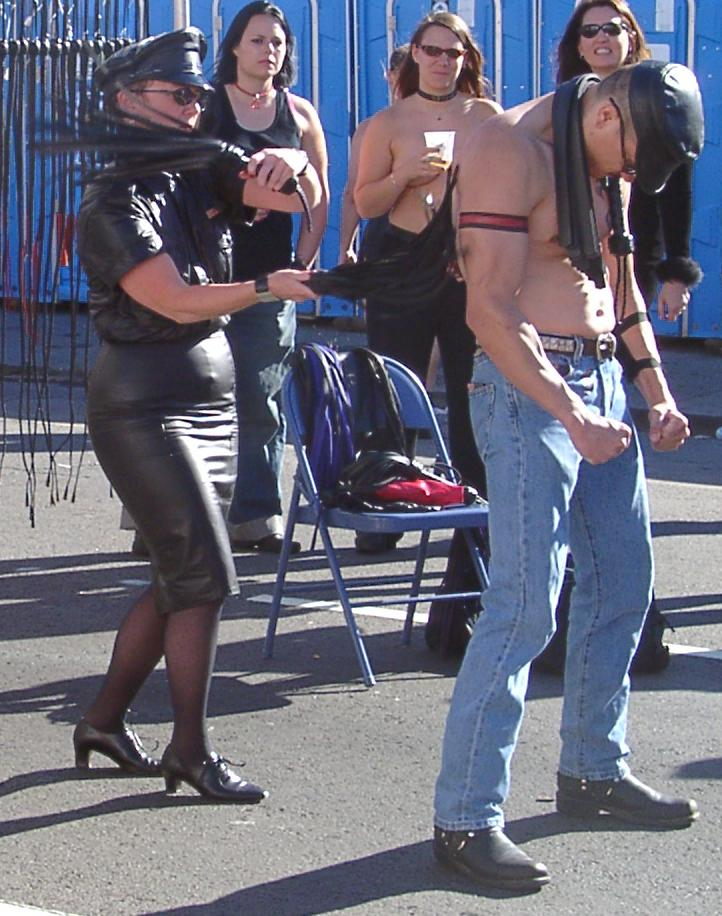
In this flogging demonstration at Folsom Street Fair 2004 the dominant is using an advanced double flogger technique.

Impact play is a human sexual practice in which one person is struck (usually repeatedly) by another person for the gratification of either or both parties which may or may not be sexual in nature. It is considered a form of BDSM.

In erotic spanking the sub is struck on the buttocks either with the dom's open hand, or a rigid implement such as a paddle, cane or riding crop. In the latter case the activity is often referred to as paddling, caning or cropping.

In erotic flagellation the sub is struck with a flexible implement such as a whip or belt.

== History ==
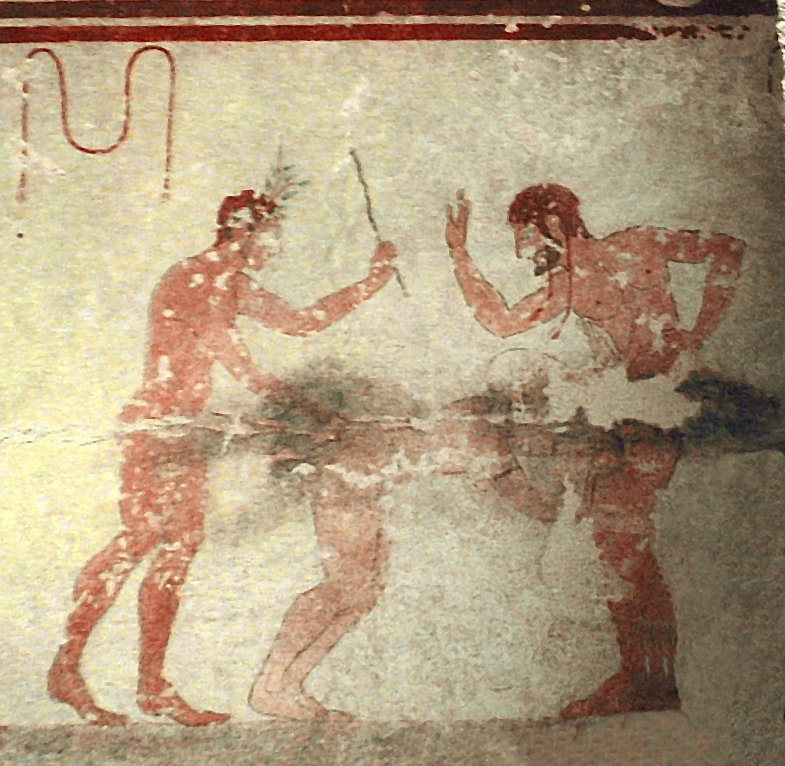
Fresco inside the Etruscan Tomb of the Whipping where two men are portrayed flagellating a person in an erotic situation

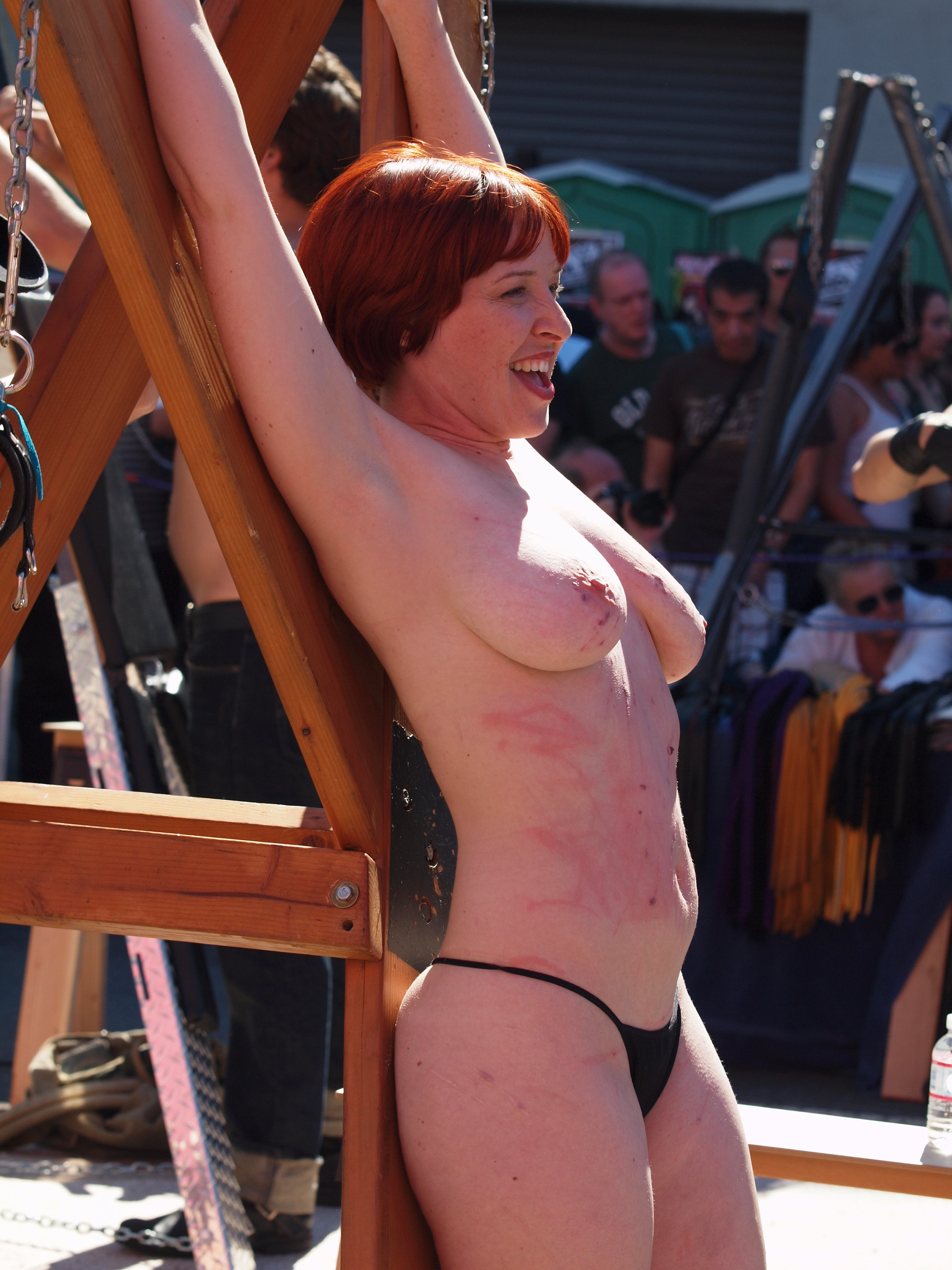
Photo shows a submissive woman bound to Saint Andrew's Cross whipped at Folsom Street Fair 2010. The red marks on her body are from the whipping.

One of the earliest depictions of erotic flagellation is found in the Etruscan Tomb of the Whipping from the fifth century BC, named after its depictions of eroticized flagellation. Another reference related to flagellation is to be found in the sixth book of the Satires of the ancient Roman Poet Juvenal (1st–2nd century A.D.) further reference can be found in Petronius's Satyricon where a delinquent is whipped for sexual arousal.

There are anecdotal reports of people willingly being bound or whipped, as a prelude to or substitute for sex, during the 14th century. Flagellation practiced within an erotic setting has been recorded from at least the 1590s, as evidenced by a John Davies epigram, and references to "flogging schools" in Thomas Shadwell's The Virtuoso (1676) and Tim Tell-Troth's Knavery of Astrology (1680). Visual evidence such as mezzotints and print media is also identified revealing scenes of flagellation in the 1600s, such as in the late seventeenth-century English mezzotint "The Cully Flaug'd" from the British Museum collection.

In the 1639 book, De Usu Flagrorum (which David Savran declared was the authoritative text on the subject for two hundred years), the author Ioannes Henricus Meibomius “rejoice[s]” to know that when someone doing flogging for sexual gratification was found in Germany, they would be burned alive.

John Cleland's novel Fanny Hill, published in 1749, incorporates a flagellation scene between the character's protagonist Fanny Hill and Mr Barville. This book is considered "the first original English prose pornography, and the first pornography to use the form of the novel". It is one of the most prosecuted and banned books in history. A large number of flagellation publications followed it, including Fashionable Lectures: Composed and Delivered with Birch Discipline (c1761), promoting the names of ladies offering the service in a lecture room with rods and cat o' nine tails.

Representations of erotic spanking and flagellation make up a large portion of Victorian pornography, for instance 1000 Nudes by Koetzle. Hundreds of thousands of engravings, photographs, and literary depictions of spanking and flagellation fantasies circulated during the Victorian era, including erotic novellas like The Whippingham Papers, The Birchen Bouquet, Exhibition of Female Flagellants or the pornographic comic opera Lady Bumtickler's Revels.

Theresa Berkley (died 1836) ran a high-class flagellation brothel at 28 Charlotte Street (which is today's 84–94 Hallam Street). She was a "governess", i.e. she specialised in chastisement, whipping, flagellation, and the like. In 1828 she invented the "Berkley Horse", an apparatus that reportedly earned her a fortune in flogging wealthy men and women of the time. Her fame was such that the 1830 pornographic novel Exhibition of Female Flagellants was attributed to her, probably falsely.

Today, a subculture known as Christian domestic discipline (CDD) promotes spanking of wives by their husbands as a form of punishment; some describe CDD as a form of abuse and controlling behavior, but others consider it a simple sexual fetish and an outlet for sadomasochistic desires. Christian conservative radio host Bryan Fischer said to the Huffington Post that it was a "horrifying trend – bizarre, twisted, unbiblical and un-Christian".
