= Slang Dictionary =

Slang Dictionary could refer to:

- Slang dictionary, a class of dictionaries of slang and informal language
- The Slang Dictionary by John Camden Hotten, first published in 1859
