= Dr Vance =

Dr Vance may refer to

- Dr Vance, associate and executor of dominatrix Theresa Berkley
- Eli Vance, a fictional character from the Half-Life 2 series of computer games by Valve
