= The Rodiad =

Poem by John Camden Hotten

The Rodiad is a pornographic poem on the subject of flagellation published by John Camden Hotten in 1871, although falsely dated to 1810. It was falsely ascribed when printed to George Colman the Younger. Its author was Richard Monckton Milnes. Henderson places it in The Library Illustrative of Social Progress published around 1872 (falsely dated 1777) but it is not in the list of Henry Spencer Ashbee.

The Betuliad, a manuscript in the British Library from Ashbee's bequest, is identical to The Rodiad. It was known under this title to Sir Richard Burton who wrote to Milne on 22 January 1860 praising it.

The Canadian author John Glassco repeated the false attribution to Colman and augmented it with an equally fictitious attribution of his own poem Squire Hardman printed in 1967.
