= Rhyming slang =

When words are replaced by their rhymes

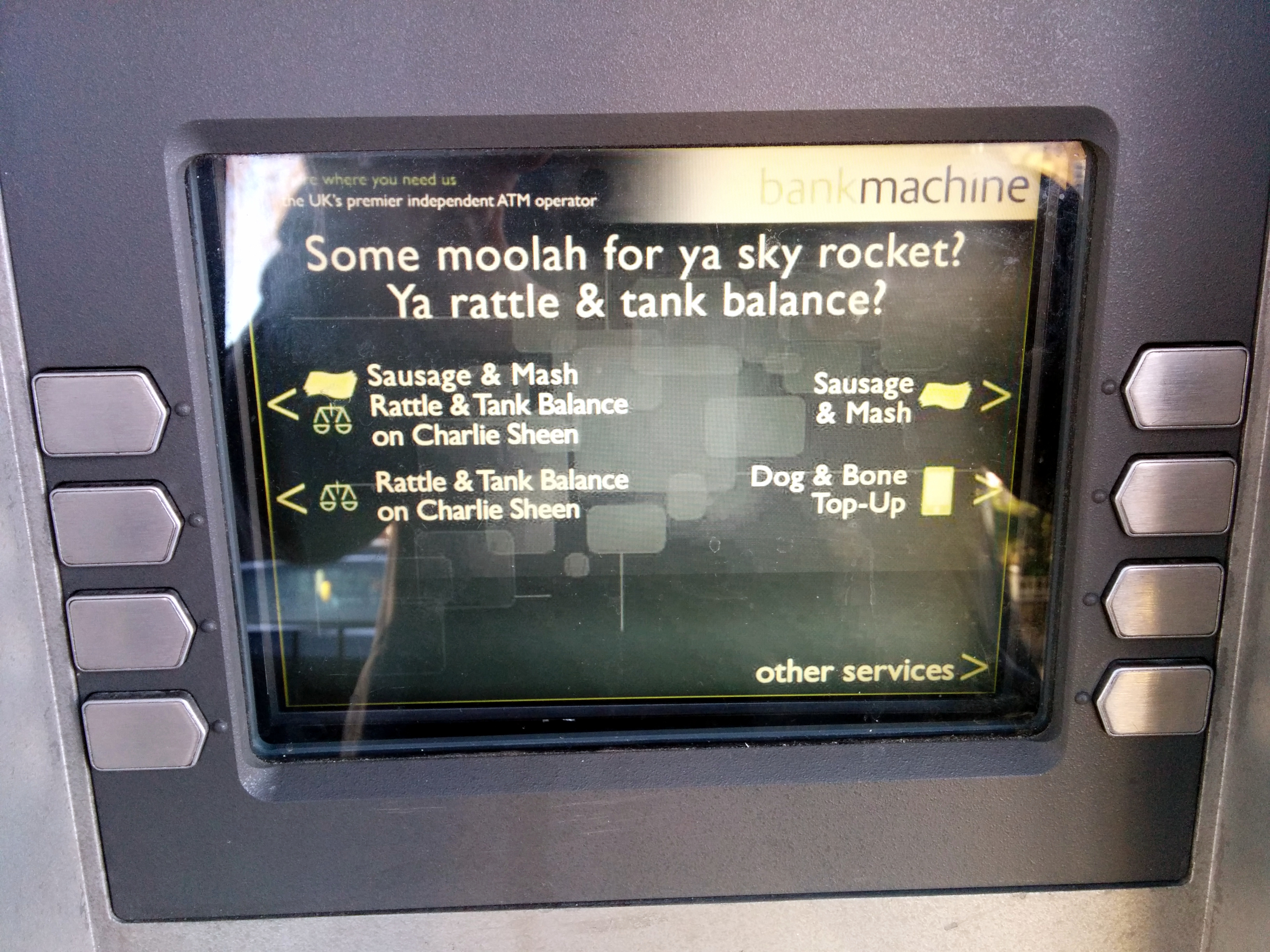
An optional Cockney rhyming slang language setting on an ATM on Hackney Road in London, England. The rhyming words are not omitted, to make the slang easier to understand.

Rhyming slang is a form of slang word construction in the English language. It is especially prevalent among Cockneys in England, and was first used in the early 19th century in the East End of London; hence its alternative name, Cockney rhyming slang. In the United States, especially in the criminal underworld of the West Coast between 1880 and 1920, rhyming slang has sometimes been known as Australian slang.

The construction of rhyming slang involves replacing a common word with a phrase of two or more words, the last of which rhymes with the original word; then, in almost all cases, omitting, from the end of the phrase, the secondary rhyming word (which is thereafter implied), making the origin and meaning of the phrase elusive to listeners not in the know.

== Examples ==
The form of Cockney slang is made clear with the following example. The rhyming phrase apples and pears is used to mean 'stairs'. Following the pattern of omission, "and pears" is dropped, thus the spoken phrase "I'm going up the apples" means "I'm going up the stairs".

The following are further common examples of these phrases:

Slang word	Meaning	Original phrase	Notes
Adam and Eve	'believe'	Adam and Eve	
Aris	'arse'	bottle and glass; Aristotle	This is the result of a double rhyme. Arse was rhymed with bottle and glass. Bottle was then rhymed with Aristotle and truncated to Aris.
bird	'time'	bird lime	
bottle	'arse'	bottle and glass	
Brahms	'pissed'	Brahms and Liszt	
boracic (abbr: brassic)	'skint'	boracic lint	
Bristol	'titty'	Bristol City	often pluralised as Bristols
Britneys	'beers'	Britney Spears	
butcher's	'look'	butcher's hook	e.g. "Let's have a butcher's at that."
china	'mate'	china plate	
dog	'telephone'	dog and bone	
frog	'road'	Frog and Toad	
Gary	'tablet' (ecstasy)	Gary Ablett	
grass	'copper' (police officer or informant) or 'shopper' (from cop-shop)	grasshopper	
Gregory	'neck'	Gregory Peck	e.g. "Stop breathing down my Gregory!"
Hampsteads	'teeth'	Hampstead Heath	
jam tart	'fart'	jam tart	
Khyber	'arse'	Khyber Pass	
loaf	'head'	loaf of bread	e.g. "Use your loaf!"
mince	'eye'	mince pie	Often pluralised as minces
Ogden	'slash' (slang for 'urine')	Ogden Nash	
pork (or porkie)	'lie'	pork pie	e.g. "Have you been telling me porkies?"
plaster	'arse'	bottle and glass; Aristotle; plaster of Paris	This is the result of a triple rhyme. Arse was rhymed with bottle and glass. Bottle was then rhymed with Aristotle and truncated to Aris. Lastly, Aris was rhymed with plaster of Paris.
plates	'feet'	plates of meat	
raspberry	'cripple'	raspberry ripple	
raspberry	'fart'	raspberry tart	See also: blowing a raspberry
rub	'pub'	"Rub-a-dub-dub"	
septic (abbr: seppo)	'Yank'	septic tank	
syrup	'wig'	syrup of figs	
threepenny	'tit'	threepenny bit	Often pluralised as threepennys
tit for (abbr: titfer)	'hat'	tit for tat	
Tom	'jewellery'	tomfoolery	
trouble	'wife'	trouble and strife	
treacle	'sweetheart'	treacle tart	
Turkish	'laugh'	Turkish bath	
weasel	'coat'	weasel and stoat	
whistle	'suit'	whistle and flute	

In some cases the meaning is further obscured by additional iterations of rhyme. For example, Aris and plaster are double and triple rhymes of 'arse' respectively. First, arse was rhymed with bottle and glass, shortened to bottle. Next, bottle was rhymed with Aristotle and truncated to Aris. Thus Aris emerged as a double rhyme of 'arse'. Aris was then itself further rhymed with plaster of Paris, producing plaster as a triple rhyme of 'arse'.

=== Phonetic versus phono-semantic forms ===
Ghil'ad Zuckermann, a linguist and revivalist, has proposed a distinction between rhyming slang based on sound only, and phono-semantic rhyming slang, which includes a semantic link between the slang expression and its referent (the thing it refers to). An example of rhyming slang based only on sound is the Cockney tea leaf 'thief'. An example of phono-semantic rhyming slang is the Cockney sorrowful tale 'jail', in which case the person coining the slang term sees a semantic link, sometimes jocular, between the Cockney expression and its referent.

=== Mainstream usage ===
The use of rhyming slang has spread beyond the purely dialectal and examples are to be found in the mainstream British English lexicon, although many users may be unaware of the origin of those words.

- The expression "blowing a raspberry" comes from raspberry tart for 'fart'.
- Berk, a mild pejorative widely used across the UK and not usually considered particularly offensive, although the origin lies in a contraction of "Berkeley Hunt", as the rhyme for the significantly more offensive 'cunt'.
- "To have a butcher's" for 'to have a look', from butcher's hook.

Most of the words changed by this process are nouns, but a few are adjectival, e.g., bales (of cotton) 'rotten', or the adjectival phrase "on one's Tod" for 'on one's own', after Tod Sloan, a famous jockey.

== History ==
Rhyming slang is believed to have originated in the mid-19th century in the East End of London, with several sources suggesting some time in the 1840s. The Flash Dictionary, of unknown authorship, published in 1921 by Smeeton (48mo), contains a few rhymes. John Camden Hotten's 1859 Dictionary of Modern Slang, Cant, and Vulgar Words likewise states that it originated in the 1840s ("about twelve or fifteen years ago"), but with "chaunters" and "patterers" in the Seven Dials area of London. Hotten's Dictionary included the first known "Glossary of the Rhyming Slang", which included later mainstays such as frog and toad 'the main road' and apples and pears 'stairs', as well as many more obscure examples, e.g. Battle of the Nile 'a tile' (a common term for a hat), Duke of York 'take a walk', and Top of Rome 'home'.

It remains a matter of speculation exactly how rhyming slang originated, for example, as a linguistic game among friends or as a cryptolect developed intentionally to confuse non-locals. If deliberate, it may also have been used to maintain a sense of community, or to allow traders to talk amongst themselves in marketplaces to facilitate collusion, without customers knowing what they were saying, or by criminals to confuse the police (see thieves' cant).

The academic, lexicographer and radio personality Terence Dolan has suggested that rhyming slang was invented by Irish immigrants to London "so the actual English wouldn't understand what they were talking about."

== Development ==
Many examples of rhyming slang are based on locations in London, such as Peckham Rye, meaning 'tie', which dates from the late nineteenth century; Hampstead Heath, meaning 'teeth' (usually as Hampsteads), which was first recorded in 1887; and barnet (Barnet Fair), meaning 'hair', which dates from the 1850s.

In the 20th century, rhyming slang began to be based on the names of celebrities and pop culture references:

Pop culture reference	Meaning	Citation
Andrea Corr, George Bernard Shaw, Roger Moore, or Rory O'Moore	door	
Alan Whicker	knickers	
Bob Marley	"Charlie", a street name for cocaine	
Boutros Boutros-Ghali or Gianluca Vialli	oats and barley	
Brady Bunch	lunch	
Britney Spears	beers or tears	
Bugs Bunny	money	
Captain Kirk	work	
Dan Dare, Lionel Blair, Rupert Bear, or Tony Blair	flares	
D'Oyly Carte	'fart'	
Father Ted	dead	
Gregory Peck	neck or cheque	
Hank Marvin	starving	
Henry Hall	balls	
Jimmy Riddle	'piddle' (as in urinate)	
Jodrell Bank, J. Arthur Rank, or Sherman tank	'wank'	
Kurt Cobain	cocaine	
Max Miller	pillow (pronounced /ˈpilə/)	
Meryl Streep	cheap	
Mickey Mouse	Scouse	
Mona Lisa	pizza	
Nat King Cole	"the dole"	
Niki Lauda	"powder", a street name for cocaine	
Patsy Cline	"line", a street name for cocaine	
"Pop Goes the Weasel"	diesel	
Puff Daddy	caddy	
Ruby Murray	curry	
Schindler's List	pissed	
Scooby-Doo, normally shortened to just 'Scooby,' e.g., "I haven't a Scooby"	clue	
Wallace and Gromit	vomit	
Winnie the Pooh	shoe	

Many examples have passed into common usage. Some substitutions have become relatively widespread in England in their contracted form. To have a butcher's, meaning 'to have a look', originates from butcher's hook, an S-shaped hook used by butchers to hang up meat, and dates from the late nineteenth century but has existed independently in general use from around the 1930s simply as butchers. Similarly, "use your loaf", meaning 'use your head', derives from loaf of bread and also dates from the late nineteenth century but came into independent use in the 1930s.

Conversely usages have lapsed, or been usurped (Hounslow Heath for 'teeth', was replaced by Hampsteads starting c. 1887).

In some cases, false etymologies exist. For example, the term barney has been used to mean an altercation or fight since the late nineteenth century, although without a clear derivation. Dialog in the 2001 film Ocean's Eleven incorrectly explains that barney derives from Barney Rubble, a character from the 1960's television cartoon The Flintstones.

Before the calendar change, St Barnabas Day fell on Midsummer's Day and had its own rhyme: Barnaby Bright, Barnaby Bright. The longest day and the shortest night, although the earliest reference is in Edmund Spenser's 1594 Epithalamion, with the lines "This day the sunne is in his chiefest hight, With Barnaby the bright...", giving a clear, though unproven, derivation.

=== Regional and international variations ===
Rhyming slang is used mainly in London in England but can, to some degree, be understood across the country. Some constructions, however, rely on particular regional accents for the rhymes to work. For instance, the term Charing Cross (a place in London), used to mean 'horse' since the mid-nineteenth century, does not work for a speaker without the lot–cloth split, common in London at that time but not nowadays. A similar example is Joanna meaning 'piano', which is based on the pronunciation of piano as "pianna" /piˈænə/. Unique formations also exist in other parts of the United Kingdom, such as in the East Midlands, where the local accent has formed Derby Road, which rhymes with 'cold'.

Outside England, rhyming slang is used in many English-speaking countries in the Commonwealth of Nations, with local variations. For example, in Australian slang, the term for an English person is pommy, which is generally believed to have originated as an abbreviation of pomegranate – a pararhyme of 'immigrant'.

Rhyming slang is continually evolving, and new phrases are introduced all the time; new personalities replace old ones—pop culture introduces new words—as in "I haven't a Scooby" (from Scooby Doo, the eponymous cartoon dog of the cartoon series) meaning 'I haven't a clue'.

=== Taboo terms ===
Rhyming slang is often used as a substitute for words regarded as taboo, often to the extent that the association with the taboo word becomes unknown over time. Berk (often used to mean "foolish person") originates from the most famous of all fox hunts, the Berkeley Hunt meaning 'cunt'; cobblers (often used in the context "what you said is rubbish") originates from cobbler's awls, meaning 'balls' (as in testicles); and Hampton (usually 'ampton) meaning 'prick' (as in penis) originates from Hampton Wick (a place in London) – the second part, wick, also entered common usage as "he gets on my wick" ('he is an annoying person').

Lesser taboo terms include pony and trap for 'crap' (as in defecate, but often used to denote nonsense or low quality); to blow a raspberry (rude sound of derision) from raspberry tart for 'fart'. Taking the Mick or taking the Mickey is thought to be a rhyming slang form of taking the piss, where Mick came from Mickey Bliss.

In December 2004 Joe Pasquale, winner of the fourth series of ITV's I'm a Celebrity... Get Me Out of Here!, became well known for his frequent use of the term Jacobs, for Jacob's Cream Crackers, a rhyming slang term for knackers 'testicles'.

== In popular culture ==
Rhyming slang has been widely used in popular culture including film, television, music, literature, sport and degree classification.

=== In university degree classification ===
In the British undergraduate degree classification system a first class honours degree is known as a "Geoff Hurst" (First) after the English 1966 World Cup footballer. An upper second class degree (a.k.a. a "2:1") is called an "Attila the Hun", and a lower second class ("2:2") a "Desmond Tutu", while a third class degree is known as a "Thora Hird" or "Douglas Hurd".

=== In film ===
Cary Grant's character teaches rhyming slang to his female companion in Mr. Lucky (1943), describing it as 'Australian rhyming slang'. Rhyming slang is also used and described in a scene of the 1967 film To Sir, with Love starring Sidney Poitier, where the English students tell their foreign teacher that the slang is a drag and something for old people. The closing song of the 1969 crime caper, The Italian Job, ("Getta Bloomin' Move On" a.k.a. "The Self Preservation Society") contains many slang terms.

Rhyming slang has been used to lend authenticity to an East End setting. Examples include Lock, Stock and Two Smoking Barrels (1998) (wherein the slang is translated via subtitles in one scene); The Limey (1999); Sexy Beast (2000); Snatch (2000); Ocean's Eleven (2001); and Austin Powers in Goldmember (2002); It's All Gone Pete Tong (2004), after BBC radio disc jockey Pete Tong whose name is used in this context as rhyming slang for "wrong"; Green Street Hooligans (2005). In Margin Call (2011), Will Emerson, played by London-born actor Paul Bettany, asks a friend on the telephone, "How's the trouble and strife?" ("wife").

Cockneys vs Zombies (2012) mocked the genesis of rhyming slang terms when a Cockney character calls zombies "Trafalgars" to even his Cockney fellows' puzzlement; he then explains it thus: "Trafalgar square – fox and hare – hairy Greek – five day week – weak and feeble – pins and needles – needle and stitch – Abercrombie and Fitch – Abercrombie: zombie".

The live-action Disney film Mary Poppins Returns song "Trip A Little Light Fantastic" involves Cockney rhyming slang in part of its lyrics, and is primarily spoken by the London lamplighters.

In the animated superhero film Spider-Man: Across the Spider-Verse (2023), character Spider-Punk, a Camden native, is heard saying: "I haven't got a Scooby-Doo" ("clue").

=== Television ===
Slang had a resurgence of popular interest in Britain beginning in the 1970s, resulting from its use in a number of London-based television programmes such as Steptoe and Son (1970–74); and Not On Your Nellie (1974–75), starring Hylda Baker as Nellie Pickersgill, alludes to the phrase "not on your Nellie Duff", rhyming slang for "not on your puff" i.e. not on your life. Similarly, The Sweeney (1975–78) alludes to the phrase "Sweeney Todd" for "Flying Squad", a rapid response unit of London's Metropolitan Police. In The Fall and Rise of Reginald Perrin (1976–79), a comic twist was added to rhyming slang by way of spurious and fabricated examples which a young man had laboriously attempted to explain to his father (e.g. 'dustbins' meaning 'children', as in 'dustbin lids'='kids'; 'Teds' being 'Ted Heath' and thus 'teeth'; and even 'Chitty Chitty' being 'Chitty Chitty Bang Bang', and thus 'rhyming slang'...). It was also featured in an episode of The Good Life in the first season (1975) where Tom and Barbara purchase a wood-burning range from a junk trader called Sam, who litters his language with phony rhyming slang in hopes of convincing suburban residents that he is an authentic traditional Cockney trader. He comes up with a fake story as to the origin of Cockney rhyming slang and is caught out rather quickly. In The Jeffersons season 2 (1976) episode "The Breakup: Part 2", Mr. Bentley explains Cockney rhyming slang to George Jefferson, in that "whistle and flute" means "suit", "apples and pears" means "stairs", "plates of meat" means "feet".

The use of rhyming slang was also prominent in Mind Your Language (1977–79), Citizen Smith (1977–80), Minder (1979–94), Only Fools and Horses (1981–91), and EastEnders (1985–). Minder could be quite uncompromising in its use of obscure forms without any clarification. Thus the non-Cockney viewer was obliged to deduce that, say, "iron" was "male homosexual" ('iron'='iron hoof'='poof'). One episode in Series 5 of Steptoe and Son was entitled "Any Old Iron", for the same reason, when Albert thinks that Harold is 'on the turn'. Variations of rhyming slang were also used in sitcom Birds of a Feather, by main characters Sharon and Tracey, often to the confusion of character, Dorian Green, who was unfamiliar with the terms. In a 1976 sketch from The Two Ronnies, Ronnie Barker portrayed a vicar delivering a sermon in rhyming slang.

One early US show to regularly feature rhyming slang was the Saturday morning children's show The Bugaloos (1970–72), with the character of Harmony (Wayne Laryea) often incorporating it in his dialogue.

=== Music ===
In popular music, Spike Jones and his City Slickers recorded "So 'Elp Me", based on rhyming slang, in 1950. The 1967 Kinks song "Harry Rag" was based on the usage of the name Harry Wragg as rhyming slang for "fag" (i.e. a cigarette). The idiom made a brief appearance in the UK-based DJ reggae music of the 1980s in the hit "Cockney Translation" by Smiley Culture of South London; this was followed a couple of years later by Domenick and Peter Metro's "Cockney and Yardie". London-based artists such as Audio Bullys and Chas & Dave (and others from elsewhere in the UK, such as The Streets, who are from Birmingham) frequently use rhyming slang in their songs.

British-American rapper MF Doom wrote an ode to the practice after moving to the UK. The track, entitled "Rhymin' Slang", was released on his 2012 collaborative album with Jneiro Jarel, Key to the Kuffs.

Another contributor was Lonnie Donegan who had a song called "My Old Man's a Dustman". In it he says his father has trouble putting on his boots "He's got such a job to pull them up that he calls them daisy roots".

=== Literature ===
In modern literature, Cockney rhyming slang is used frequently in the novels and short stories of Kim Newman, for instance in the short story collections "The Man from the Diogenes Club" (2006) and "Secret Files of the Diogenes Club" (2007), where it is explained at the end of each book.

In the Slough House novel London Rules by Mick Herron, the character Jackson Lamb uses the phrase "I'm overdue for a Donald", rhyming Donald Trump with 'dump' (defecation).

It is also parodied in Going Postal by Terry Pratchett, which features a geriatric Junior Postman by the name of Tolliver Groat, a speaker of 'Dimwell Arrhythmic Rhyming Slang', the only rhyming slang on the Disc which does not actually rhyme. Thus, a wig is a 'prunes', from 'syrup of prunes', an obvious parody of the Cockney syrup from syrup of figs – wig. There are numerous other parodies, though it has been pointed out that the result is even more impenetrable than a conventional rhyming slang and so may not be quite so illogical as it seems, given the assumed purpose of rhyming slang as a means of communicating in a manner unintelligible to all but the initiated.

In the book Goodbye to All That by Robert Graves, a beer is a "broken square" as Welch Fusiliers officers walk into a pub and order broken squares when they see men from the Black Watch. The Black Watch had a minor blemish on its record of otherwise unbroken squares. Fistfights ensued.

In Dashiell Hammett's The Dain Curse, the protagonist exhibits familiarity with Cockney rhyming slang, referring to gambling at dice with the phrase "rats and mice".

Cockney rhyming slang is one of the main influences for the dialect spoken in A Clockwork Orange (1962). The author of the novel, Anthony Burgess, also believed the phrase "as queer as a clockwork orange" was Cockney slang having heard it in a London pub in 1945, and subsequently named it in the title of his book.

=== Sport ===
In Scottish football, a number of clubs have nicknames taken from rhyming slang. Partick Thistle are known as the "Harry Rags", which is taken from the rhyming slang of their 'official' nickname "the jags". Rangers are known as the "Teddy Bears", which comes from the rhyming slang for "the Gers" (shortened version of Ran-gers). Heart of Midlothian are known as the "Jambos", which comes from "Jam Tarts" which is the rhyming slang for "Hearts" which is the common abbreviation of the club's name. Hibernian are also referred to as "The Cabbage" which comes from Cabbage and Ribs being the rhyming slang for Hibs. The phrase Hampden Roar (originally describing the loud crowd noise emanating from the national stadium) is employed as "What's the Hampden?", ("What's the score?", idiom for "What's happening / what's going on?").

In rugby league, "meat pie" is used for try.

== See also ==
- Argot
- Costermonger
- Euphemism
- Daffynition
- Polari
- Navvy slang
- Nickname
