= Rear of the Year =

Award for the best buttocks

- Awarded for: Celebrities considered to have a notable posterior
- Country: United Kingdom
- Presented by: Rear of the Year Ltd.
- First award: 1981 (one-off presentation in 1976)
- Final award: 2019
- Website: Official website

Rear of the Year was a British award for celebrities who were considered to have attractive buttocks. It was created by publicity consultant Anthony Edwards in 1976. Initially, it was awarded only to women, but in 1986 the first award was made to a man and from 1997, it was awarded annually to one woman and one man.

The award was organised by Rear of the Year Limited. The last contest was held in 2019, and Rear of the Year Limited was dissolved as a company in 2021.

== History ==
Edwards initiated the award as a way to promote specific brands of jeans. Barbara Windsor won the first award in 1976, which was presented as a one-off publicity stunt. Five years later it became an annual event, with Felicity Kendal receiving the honours. The 1982 winner, Suzi Quatro, commented: "I’ve been told since I was about eight or nine that I had a nice ass... So, when I won the award, I was actually quite proud." The singer Lulu, who won the 1983 award, was later asked by a journalist if she felt that she had been the subject of objectification when she won the award, and replied: 'I think you're taking this all much too seriously'. On winning the award in 1985, Lynsey de Paul quipped, "I would like to thank the organisers from the heart of my bottom". In 1986, the award was presented to a man for the first time (Michael Barrymore) and 1991 saw Marina Ogilvy, the daughter of Princess Alexandra, became the first royal recipient. A male award was given to Richard Fairbrass in 1994, and from 1997 the male award became a regular part of the annual event. The 2002 award to Charlotte Church attracted controversy, as the winner had only recently turned 16 at the time.

2010 winner Fiona Bruce accepted the award and participated in a photoshoot, happily posing for pictures in tight jeans. However, she subsequently described the award as "the most hypocritical, ridiculous, ludicrous thing I’ve ever done."

In 2014, Carol Vorderman became the first person to receive the award for a second time, joking: "I always suspected there were a lot of people out there who were glad to see the back of me. It now appears there were even more than I thought."

The winners of the award were selected by public vote, a process that sometimes accrued popular campaigns for particular individuals. The winners were usually actors in soap operas, contestants in reality TV shows or pop stars. Edwards has described the contest as "an excellent monitor of fashions in body shape". In 2012 he declared that female rears were starting to slim down as more women took to the gym, jogging and keeping trim during that Olympic year. In 2018 he said that "the trend is towards a shapely, well-toned and, above all, proportionate rear".

A number of businesses sponsored the award including manufacturers of beauty products, Cadbury and Wizard Jeans. By 2015 the award was reported to be generating a level of media coverage equivalent to £4 million (US$6 million) Advertising Value Equivalent.

Award winners were given a commemorative plaque in the form of an engraved crystal trophy. Until 2016 the award was promoted with a winner's photo op that was reported in the UK's tabloid newspapers. The event, staged for some years at The Dorchester hotel in London, was attended by numerous press photographers and included a champagne reception. Some winners subsequently described ambivalent feelings about their photo ops, during which they were photographed from behind. 2007 winner Siân Lloyd described hers as "probably the weirdest photocall I’ve attended in my life", while 2003 winner Natasha Hamilton said of seeing her pictures in the press: "I just didn’t like it. It seemed a little bit crass and seedy."

== Winners ==
Recipients included:

- 1976 — Barbara Windsor
- 1981 — Felicity Kendal
- 1982 — Suzi Quatro
- 1983 — Lulu
- 1984 — Elaine Paige
- 1985 — Lynsey de Paul
- 1986 — Anneka Rice and Michael Barrymore
- 1987 — Anita Dobson
- 1988 — Su Pollard
- 1989 — No competition
- 1990 — No competition
- 1991 — Marina Ogilvy
- 1992 — Ulrika Jonsson
- 1993 — Sarah Lancashire
- 1994 — Mandy Smith and Richard Fairbrass
- 1995 — No competition
- 1996 — Tracy Shaw
- 1997 — Melinda Messenger and Gary Barlow
- 1998 — Carol Smillie and Frank Skinner
- 1999 — Denise van Outen and Robbie Williams
- 2000 — Jane Danson and Graham Norton
- 2001 — Claire Sweeney and John Altman
- 2002 — Charlotte Church and Scott Wright
- 2003 — Natasha Hamilton and Ronan Keating
- 2004 — Alex Best and Aled Haydn Jones
- 2005 — Nell McAndrew and Will Young
- 2006 — Javine Hylton and Ian Wright
- 2007 — Siân Lloyd and Lee Mead
- 2008 — Jennifer Ellison and Ryan Thomas
- 2009 — Rachel Stevens and Russell Watson
- 2010 — Fiona Bruce and Ricky Whittle
- 2011 — Carol Vorderman and Anton du Beke
- 2012 — Shobna Gulati and John Major
- 2013 — Flavia Cacace and Vincent Simone
- 2014 — Carol Vorderman and Olly Murs
- 2015 — Kym Marsh and Daniel Radcliffe
- 2016 — Jennifer Metcalfe and Tom Hiddleston
- 2017 — Rachel Riley and Idris Elba
- 2018 — Michelle Keegan and Aidan Turner
- 2019 — Amanda Holden and Andy Murray

== Similar contests ==
- In 2013, a University of Cambridge newspaper held its own version of the award in which the contestants were naked.
- Miss Bumbum is an annual contest in Brazil to choose the best female buttocks in the country.
