= Crop (implement) =

Short type of whip without a lash, used in horseback riding

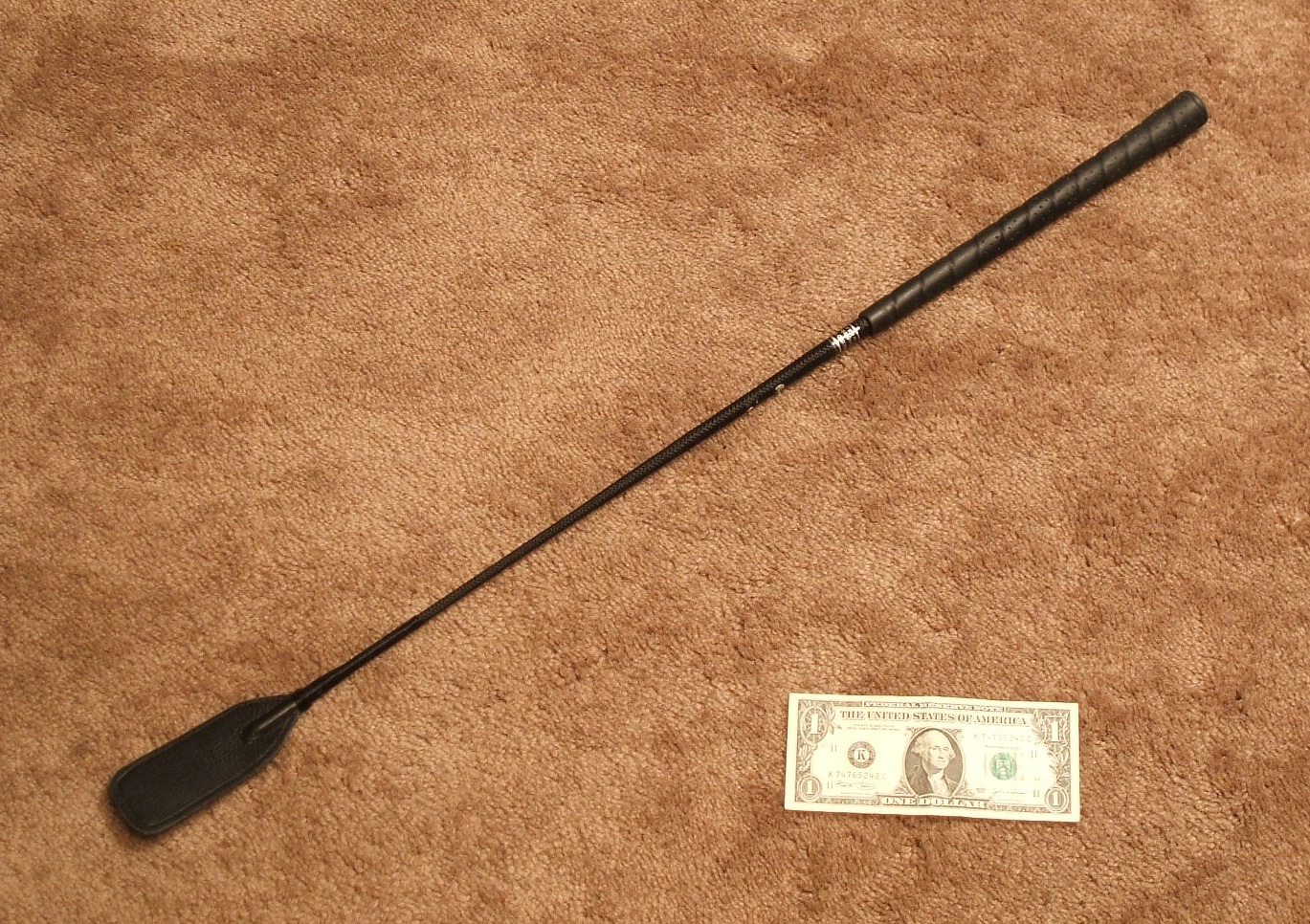
A 76-centimetre (30 in) riding crop, with a 16-centimetre (6.3 in) US dollar bill to show scale

A crop, sometimes called a riding crop or hunting crop, is a short type of whip without a lash, used in horse riding, part of the family of tools known as riding aids.

== Types and uses ==
A modern crop usually consists of a long shaft of fiberglass or cane which is covered in leather, fabric, or similar material. The rod of a crop thickens at one end to form a handle, and terminates in a thin, flexible tress such as wound cord or a leather tongue, known as a keeper. The thin end is intended to make contact with the horse, whilst the keeper prevents the horse's skin from being marked. The handle may have a loop of leather to help secure the grip or a "mushroom" on the end to prevent it from slipping through the rider's hand.

The length of a crop is designed to allow enough leverage for it to be accelerated rapidly with a controlled flick of the wrist, without causing the rider balancing problems. Thus, a true crop is relatively short.

The term "whip" is a more common term that includes both riding crops as well as longer types of horse whips used for both riding and ground work. A whip is a little slower than a crop, mostly due to having slightly greater length and flexibility.

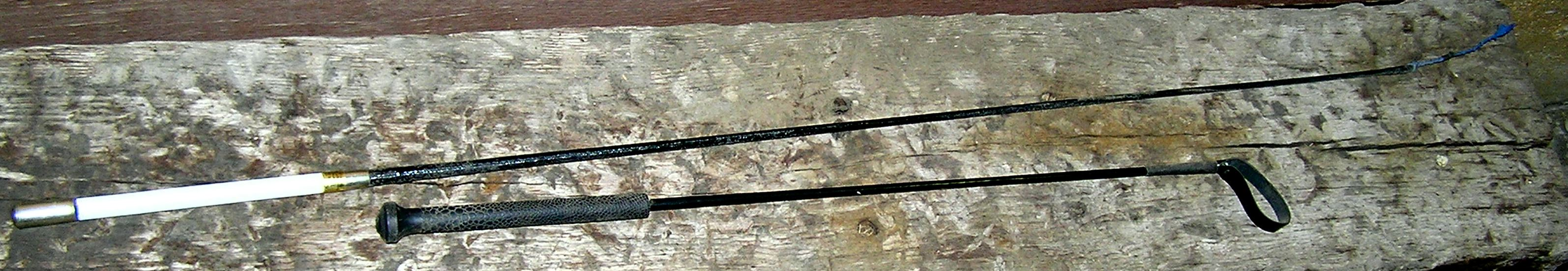
The difference between a crop and a whip. The top implement is a dressage whip, the bottom is a hunt seat riding crop.

=== In equestrianism ===
Crops are principally designed to back up the natural aids (leg, seat and voice) of a rider. The crop should not be used as punishment, where the animal fails to perform a wanted behaviour and as such is hit. Positive Punishment (+P) is the term used for the adding of an unpleasant stimulus for the performance or non performance of a behaviour. Not only has it been shown to be unsuccessful in training the horse, it also has serious implications for animal welfare, and the development of learned helplessness.

- Dressage whip is a true whip, longer than a crop, (up to 110 cm or 43 inches, including lash or popper) for horse training, allowing a rider to touch the mount's side while keeping both hands on the reins.

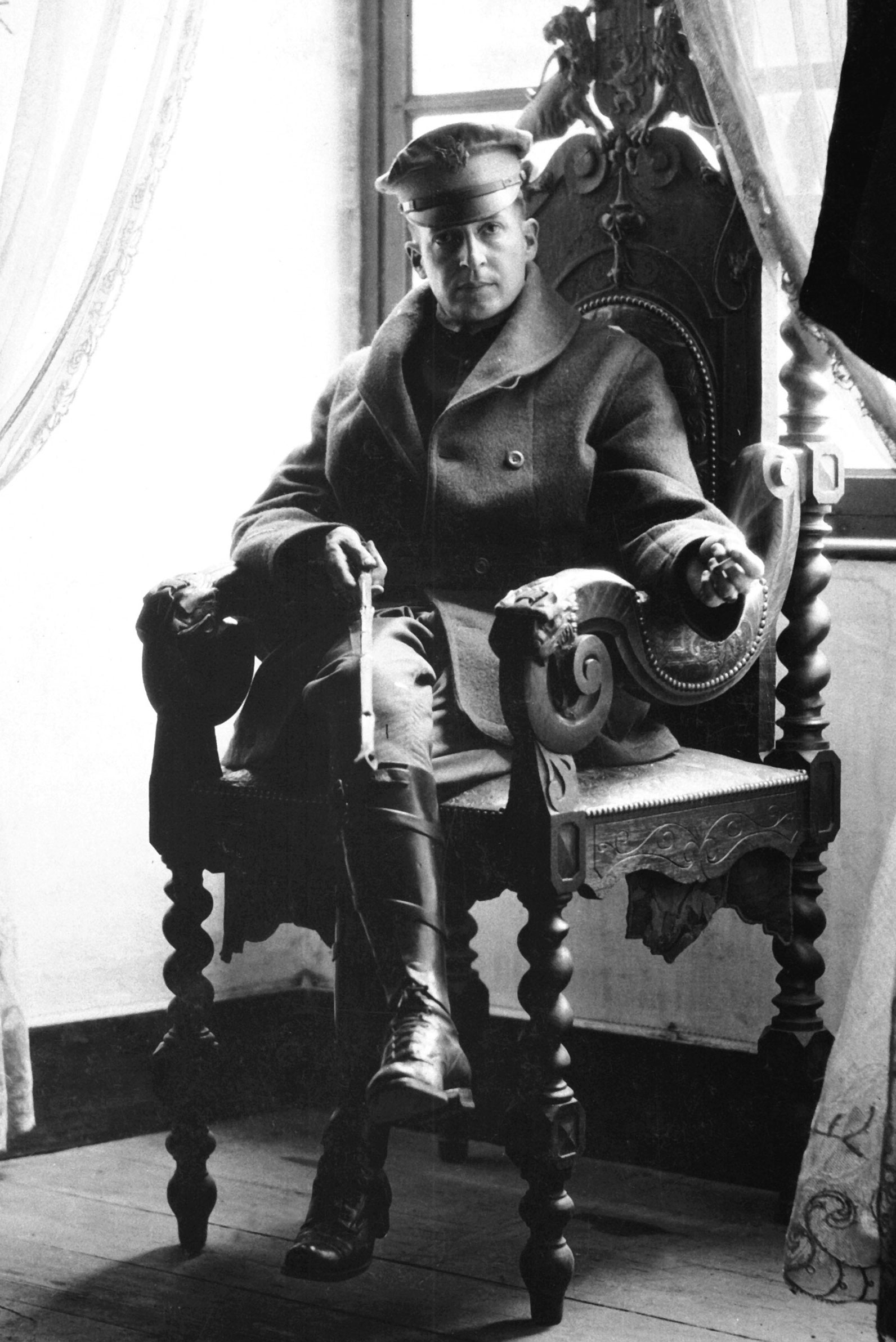
Brigadier General Douglas MacArthur holds a riding crop in his right hand in France during World War I

Hunting whips are not for use on the horse, but have a "hook" at the end to use in opening and shutting gates without dismounting, as well as a long leather thong to keep the hounds from coming near the horse's legs, and possibly getting kicked.

=== Other uses ===
==== Weapon ====
Crops can be carried as a weapon. In the Sherlock Holmes series of novels and short stories, Holmes is occasionally said to carry one as his favourite weapon (e.g., "The Adventure of the Six Napoleons"). Specifically, it is a loaded hunting crop. Such crops were sold at one time. Loading refers to the practice of filling the shaft and head with a heavy metal (e.g., steel, lead) to provide some heft.

==== BDSM ====
Crops are sometimes used in BDSM as part of impact play. Art deco sculptor Bruno Zach produced perhaps his best known sculpture—called "The Riding Crop" (c. 1925)—which features a scantily clad dominatrix wielding a crop.

== See also ==
- Quirt
- Whip
