= Bobaraba =

Dance move

Bobaraba is a national dance craze in Côte d'Ivoire, South Africa and Mali inspired by DJ Mix and DJ Eloh's hit song Bobaraba, which means "big bottom" in the local Dyula language and in the Bambara language.

== See also ==
- Bôtchô – one of the "bottom enhancers"
