= George Cannon (publisher) =

English solicitor, radical activist, publisher and pornographer

George Cannon (1789–1854) was an English solicitor, radical activist and publisher and pornographer who also used the pseudonyms Erasmus Perkins and Philosemus.

Around 1812 he became associated with freethinking discussion groups in London and in 1815 he edited, as "Erasmus Perkins", a radical periodical Theological Inquirer; or Polemical Magazine, with which Percy Bysshe Shelley was associated, and in which "Perkins" published extracts from Queen Mab: his relationship with Shelley was somewhat hostile. Cannon contributed to the Political Register of William Benbow and was also a friend of Daniel Isaac Eaton. He acted as lawyer for the anti-slavery campaigner Robert Wedderburn and may have drafted some of his polemics.

In 1822 he was publishing obscene anti-establishment parodies and satires; by 1830 his publications were sheer pornography and he was prosecuted numerous times: in 1830 he was convicted of obscene libel for publishing a French-language edition of de Sade's Juliette. His pornographic publications specialised in flagellation with such titles as The Birchen Bouquet, Exhibition of Female Flagellants and, as "Philosemus", Venus School-Mistress. He promoted the exhibition of the Berkley Horse by the Royal Society of Arts in 1837 after it was bequeathed to them by inventor Theresa Berkley.

Cannon died in 1854 and his widow continued his publishing business.
