= Miss Bumbum =

Brazilian beauty pageant

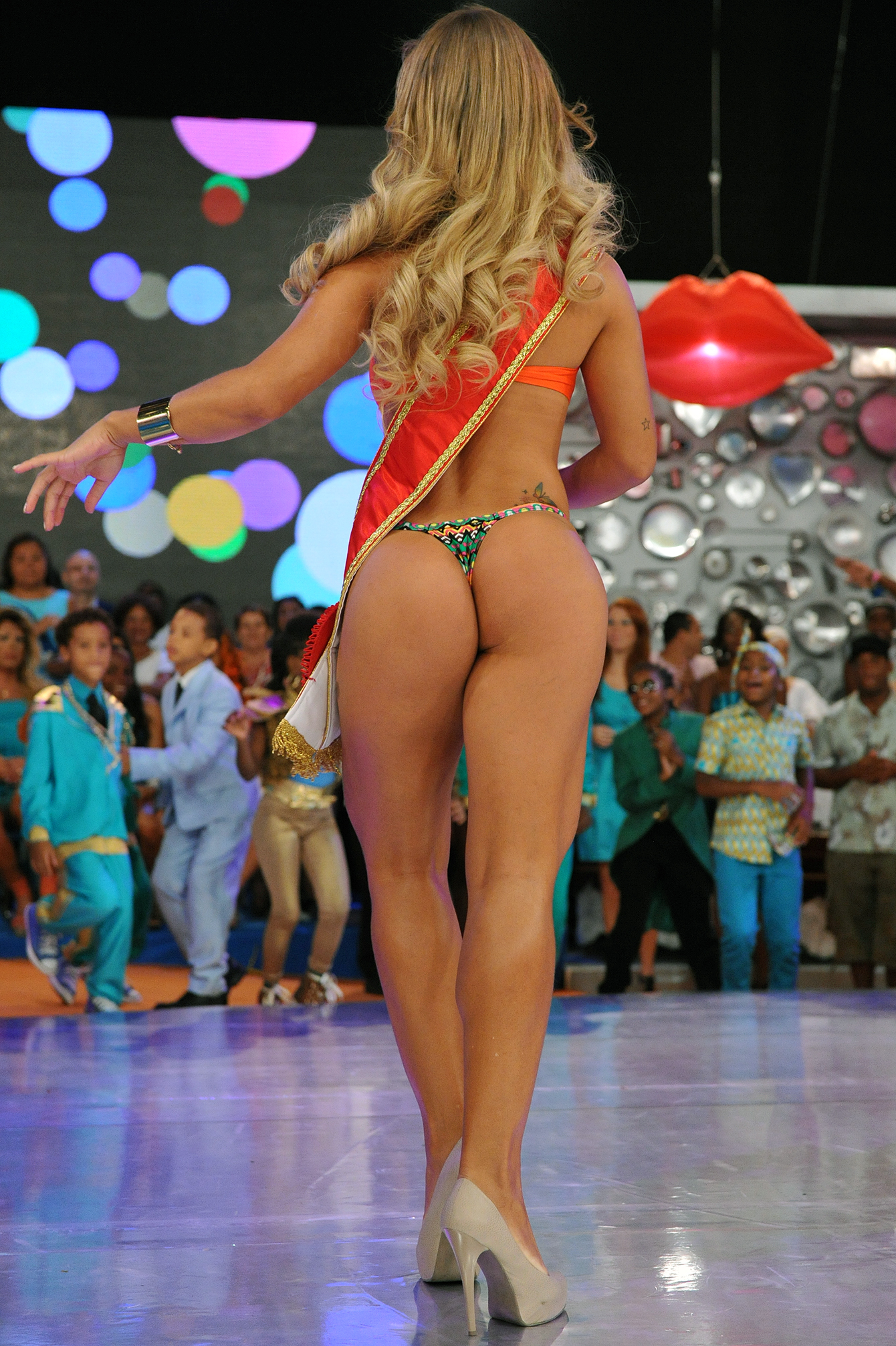
- Rosana Ferreira, winner of Miss Bumbum 2011
- Status: Active
- Genre: Beauty pageant
- Frequency: Annual
- Location: São Paulo
- Country: Brazil
- Founder: Cacau Oliver
- Participants: 27
- Website: Official website

Miss Bumbum is an annual beauty pageant held in Brazil based on the appearance of the contestants' buttocks. Created by journalist and entrepreneur Cacau Oliver, the competition has 27 contestants, each representing one of the country's 27 states. The winner receives 50,000 Brazilian reais (about US$22,000) in endorsement deals. Brazilian television network RedeTV! broadcasts the event.

Miss Bumbum entered the US market with the licensing of an official 2017 calendar for distribution in the US. The calendar was published in December 2016, featuring the 2016 winner Erika Canela on the cover.

== Winners ==
List of Winners of Miss Bumbum
2011	Rosana Ferreira	
2012	Carine Felizardo	
2013	Dai Macedo	
2014	Indianara Carvalho	
2015	Suzy Cortez	Went on to appear in the August 2016 edition of Playboy magazine
2016	Erika Canela	
2017	Rosie Oliveira	
2018	Ellen Santana	
2019	Suzy Cortez	Second time winner
2021	Lunna LeBlanc	
2022	Carolina Lekker	
2023	Larissa Sumpani	
2024	Bruna Dias	
2025	Kerolay Chaves	
2026	Mel Breia	

=== Other notable contestants ===
- Andressa Urach – model (runner up in 2012)
- Claudia Alende – model

== Controversies ==
In October 2013, according to the International Business Times, models Mari Sousa (25) and Eliana Amaral (24) were accused of paying the equivalent of thousands of US dollars in bribes to the judges of the contest.

In 2018, two trans women, Paula Oliveira and Giovanna Spinella, became contestants for Miss Bumbum, the first trans women to do so. Several of the other contestants objected to the inclusion of trans women in the contest. The 2018 contest ended with an onstage fight between contestants when one of them, Aline Uva, accused the winner of having had surgical buttock augmentation. The rules of the contest permit the contestants to have had cosmetic surgery on other parts of the body but not the buttocks.

== Similar contests ==
Miss Bumbum Brazil has led to the spin-off competitions Miss Bumbum World, the Fitness Angel Show in Japan Miss Reef, held in Chile and various other South American countries, and Got Ass, held in North America, are similar competitions engaged in judging which women have the best buttocks.

== Cultural context ==
In Brazilian slang, bumbum is a term used for a woman's buttocks, which are considered an important element of physical beauty in Brazilian culture. An appreciation of well-shaped and sizeable female buttocks is common and widespread in Brazil and the traditional Brazilian preference is for women to have large round buttocks, the Brazilian ideal being much wider, thicker and shapelier than may often be associated with the European ideal. Brazilian music and poetry featured the buttocks throughout the 20th Century.

In 2014, more than 50,000 buttock implant procedures were performed in Brazil, compared to 19,000 in the United States. The popularity of the Miss Bumbum contest in Brazil in 2014 led to online voting for the winner exceeding 2 million votes. Miss Bumbum contestants are often praised and admired for their physical fitness and commitment to exercise and dieting.

== See also ==
- Awoulaba
- Cultural history of the buttocks
- Rear of the Year
- Swimsuit competition
