= Claudia Alende =

Brazilian actress, and model

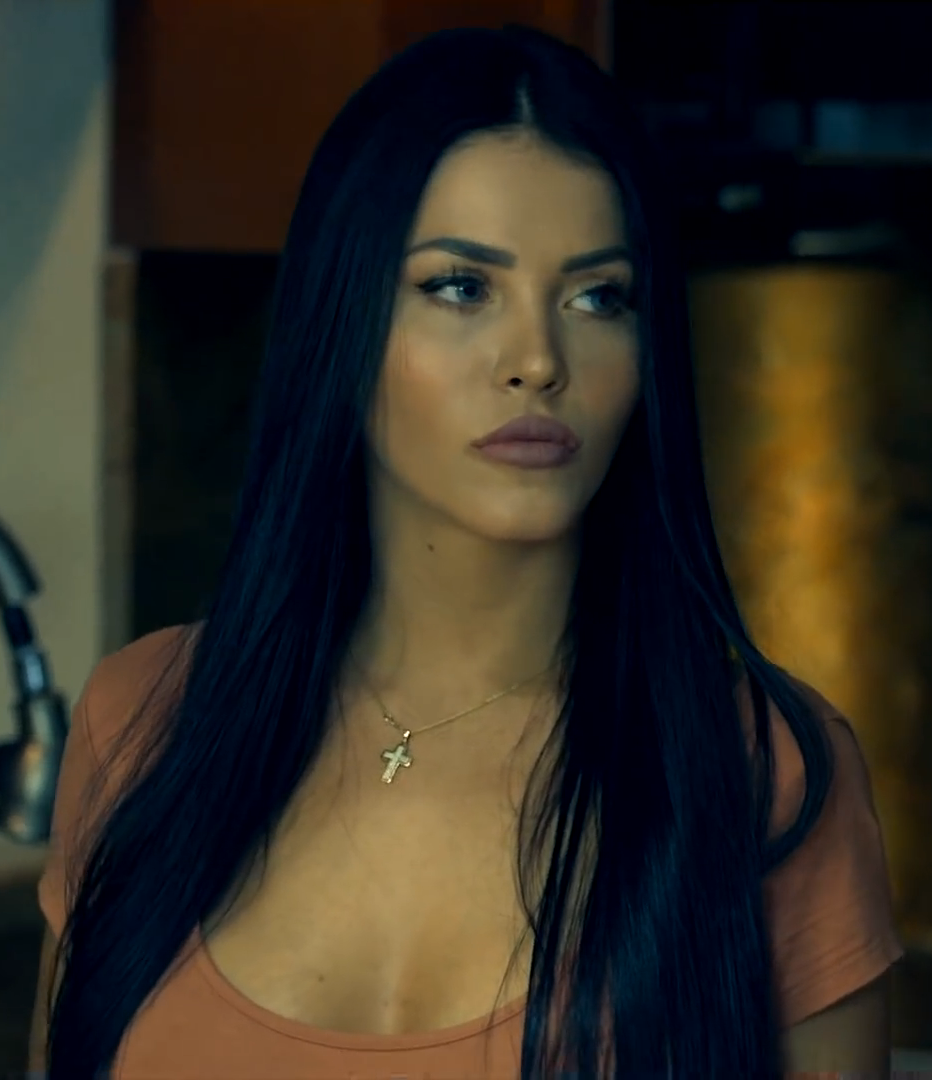
- Claudia Alende starring in the short film Lock All Doors in 2017
- Born: Claudia Manfrin Alende; 9 October 1997 (age 28); Francisco Beltrão, Brazil
- Occupations: actress, entrepreneur, singer
- Modeling information
- Agency: Blanc Media, Untitled Entertainment

Claudia Manfrin Alende (born 9 October 1997) is a Brazilian/American actress, singer, the owner of Blanc Media and the founder of Burger Babes.

== Early life ==
Alende was born in Francisco Beltrão, Paraná, and moved to São Paulo when she was 20. She is the daughter of doctor Claudio Alende and attorney Dolores Manfrin Alende. As a child, she was considered a "tomboy"; she had no interest in pursuing a modelling career, preferring to spend her time playing video games. Her mother's friends and even strangers would compliment Claudia's modelling potential.

== Career ==
In 2014, Alende participated in the Miss Bumbum contest and finished in second place, losing to Indianara Carvalho. By 2015, she was being followed by 2.8 million people on Instagram and had made £2.1 million from high-profile social media endorsements.

Alende next founded Blanc Media, an entertainment company that works with international talent currently exceeding a 50 million network on Instagram. The company involvements include music production, films and marketing.

On 29 January 2017, she was the judge of the Model Scout ID event together with Marcus Pelle, owner of DAS Models. The event was held in Barranquilla, Colombia. She had to choose one model out of 100 contestants.

In June 2017, Alende was included in a feature by Forbes magazine as one of their top 15 Instagram influencers. The magazine commented: "As both a model and businesswomen this Brazilian influencer offers a combination of health and beauty content, business advice, motivational content, and lifestyle images. Known for both her beauty and business success, Claudia puts forward the image of the modern woman who can succeed in all aspects of life."

On 4 December 2017, she released her debut single "I'm Good at Being Bad". On 10 August 2018, she released the single "Spotlight". On 22 March 2019, she released the single "Scared to Be Alone". On 23 August 2019, she released the single "Summer Crime".

On 1 April 2019, she co-founded Burger Babes, a hamburger delivery service.

On 7 February 2021, she starred in a Super Bowl commercial "All-Star Cast" for Michelob Ultra.

== Discography ==
Singles
Title	Date	Album
"I'm Good at Being Bad"	4 December 2017	Non-album single
"Spotlight"	10 August 2018	Non-album single
"Scared to Be Alone"	22 March 2019	Non-album single
"Summer Crime"	23 August 2019	Non-album single

== Filmography ==
=== Film ===
Year	Title	Role	Notes
2017	Lock All Doors	Lead actress	Short film
2017	"I'm Good at Being Bad"	Lead actress	Music video
2018	"Spotlight"	Lead actress	Music video
2019	"Scared to Be Alone"	Lead actress	Music video
2021	Super Bowl commercial for Michelob Ultra "All-Star Cast"	Lead actress	Commercial

== Awards ==
"I'm Good at Being Bad" (music video)

Special Mention Award at the Asia South East-Short Film Festival (2018)
