= Swimsuit competition =

Beauty contest

A swimsuit competition, more commonly now called a bikini contest, is a beauty contest which is judged and ranked while contestants wear a swimsuit, typically a bikini. One of the judging criteria is the physical attractiveness of the contestants. The Big Four international beauty pageants have included examples of such a competition.

Bikini contests have sometimes been organized or sponsored by companies for marketing purposes or to find new models for their products, with the contests being presented as a form of adult entertainment. Swimwear competitions have formed a part of beauty pageants, such as the Miss Earth and Miss World pageants, and sponsors have included commercial brands such as Hawaiian Tropic. Contests have also been held in bars and nightclubs, during intermissions in boxing or wrestling matches and at car shows. Bodybuilding and fitness competitions have evolved to include a bikini division. Participants in such contests may be competing for prizes including trophies, money, and modeling contracts.

== Types of bikini contests ==
Type	Image	Description
Beauty pageant	noborder	Finalists at the swimsuit round of Miss Earth 2007 from Georgia, Canada, Venezuela, Spain, Thailand, Switzerland, and India. Although many pageants play down the bikini contest part of the competition, participants in some beauty contests, such as Miss Universe, Miss International, Miss Earth or Miss USA, are required to wear bikinis as part of the competition.
Entertainment	noborder	Hooters bikini contest in Courtyard, Jacksonville, Florida, 2009.
Fitness	noborder	Fitness models at Hong Kong Bodybuilding Championships, 2012. Early women's bodybuilding was about bikini contests. After protests in the 1970s, Gloria Miller Fudge introduced actual bodybuilding. Bikini competition was made a category of the fitness and figure competitions on November 7, 2010, by IFBB to attract more female participants. The first Bikini Olympia was introduced in 2010.
Wrestling	noborder	Charles Wright hosting a bikini contest as part of the Hulkamania Tour in Melbourne, 2009. Wrestlers such as Eve Torres and Kelly Kelly are also bikini models.

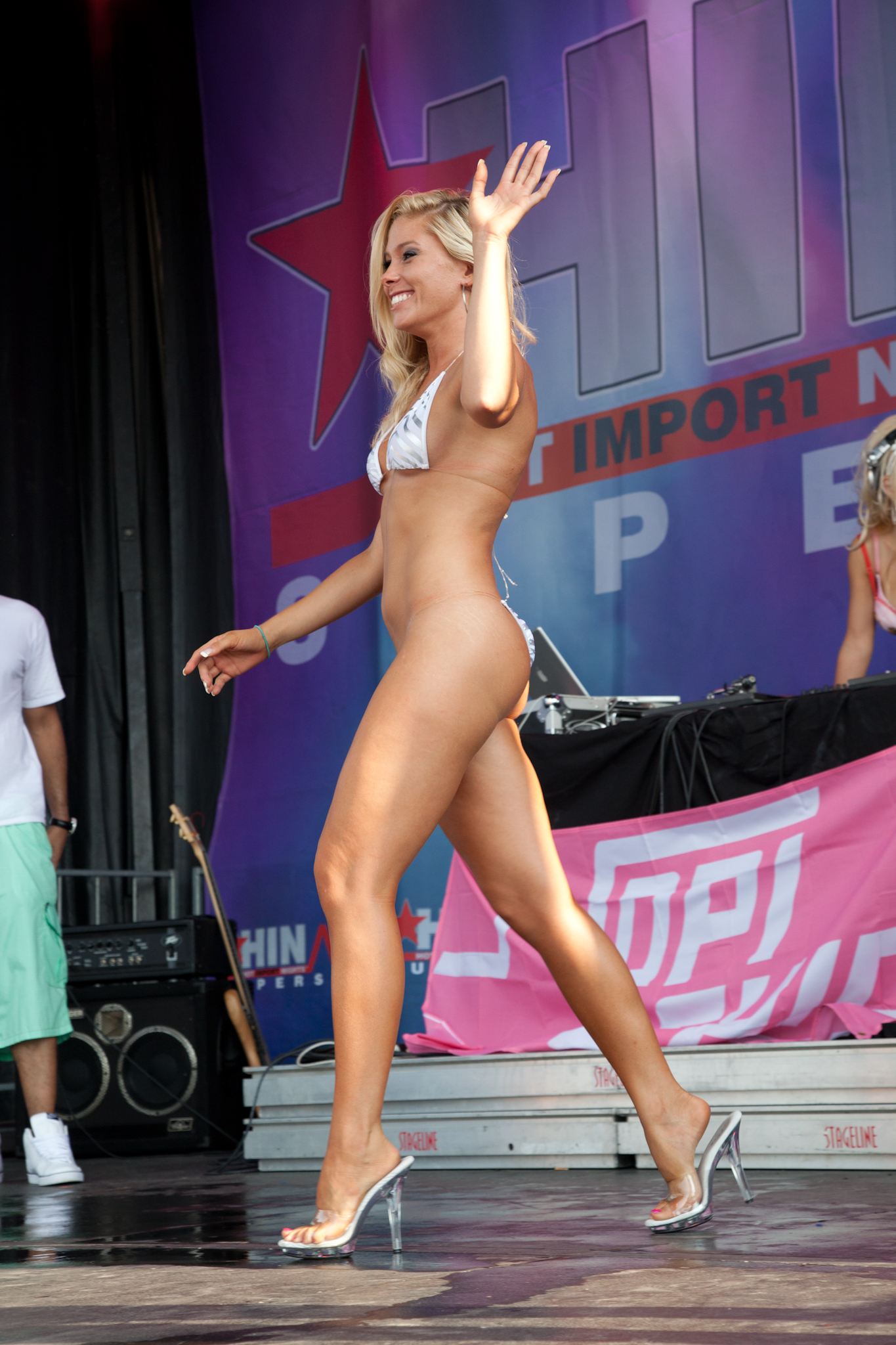
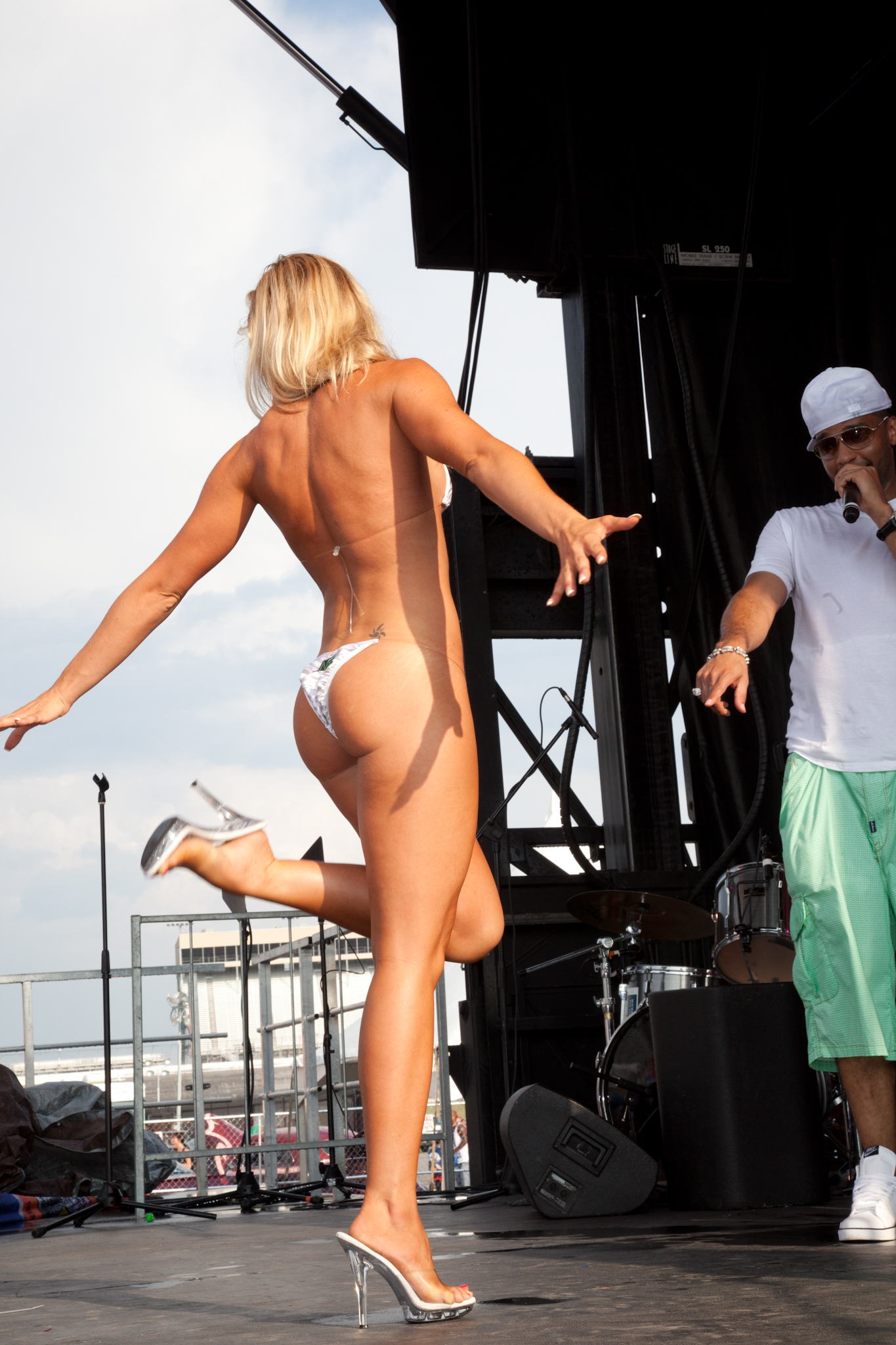
A swimsuit contestant wearing a microkini at the Hot Import Nights auto show held at the Atlanta Motor Speedway in 2010

== History ==
In the United States, beauty pageants featuring women in bathing costumes became popular during the 1880s. However, such events were not regarded as respectable. The first "Miss America" pageant, held in 1921, made such contests somewhat more acceptable, although other, less well-tolerated beauty contests continued to be held as well. Miss America discontinued its swimsuit competition in 2018 to eliminate the criterion of contestants' physical appearance as a basis of judgment.

== Contest organization ==
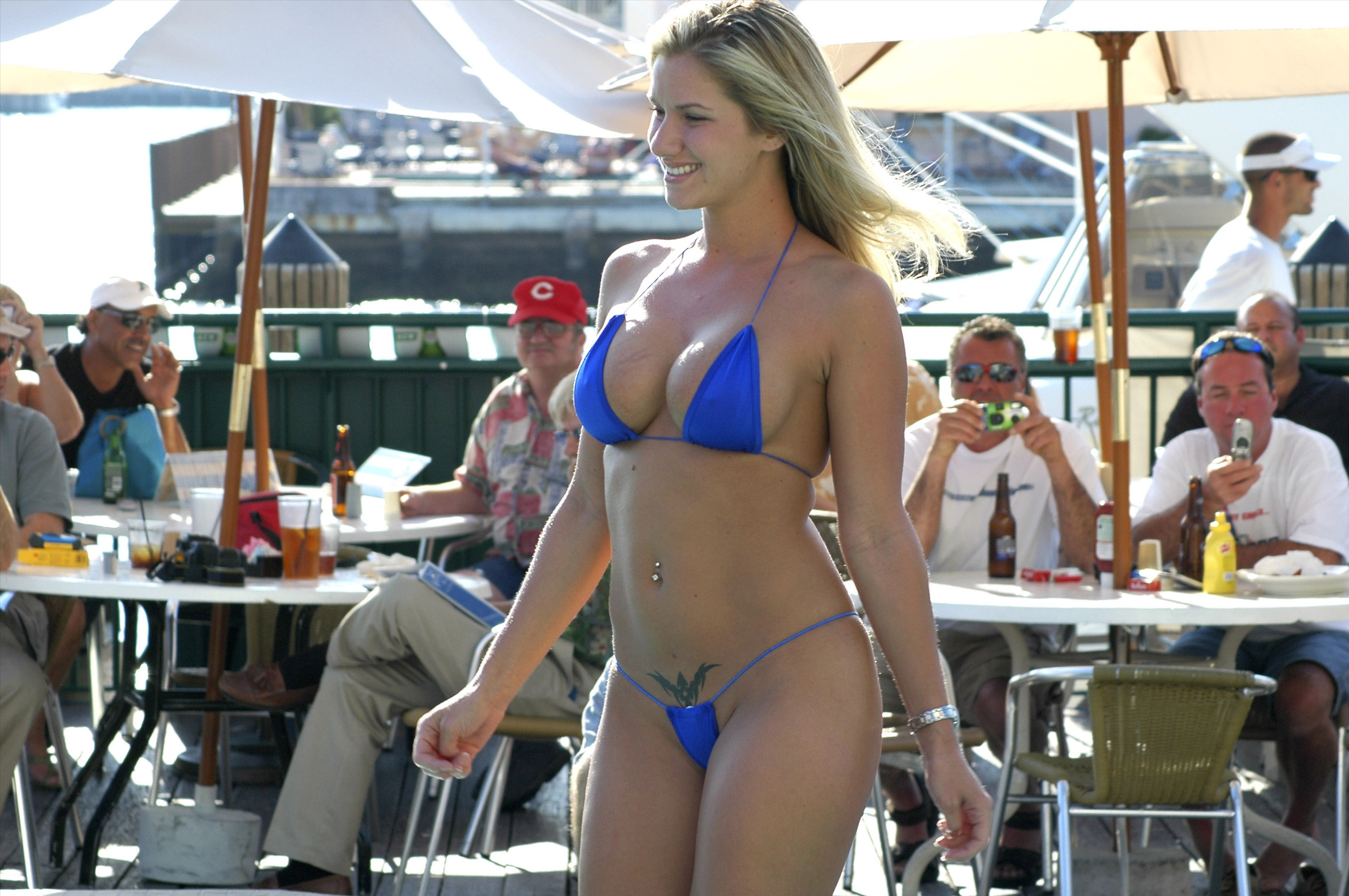
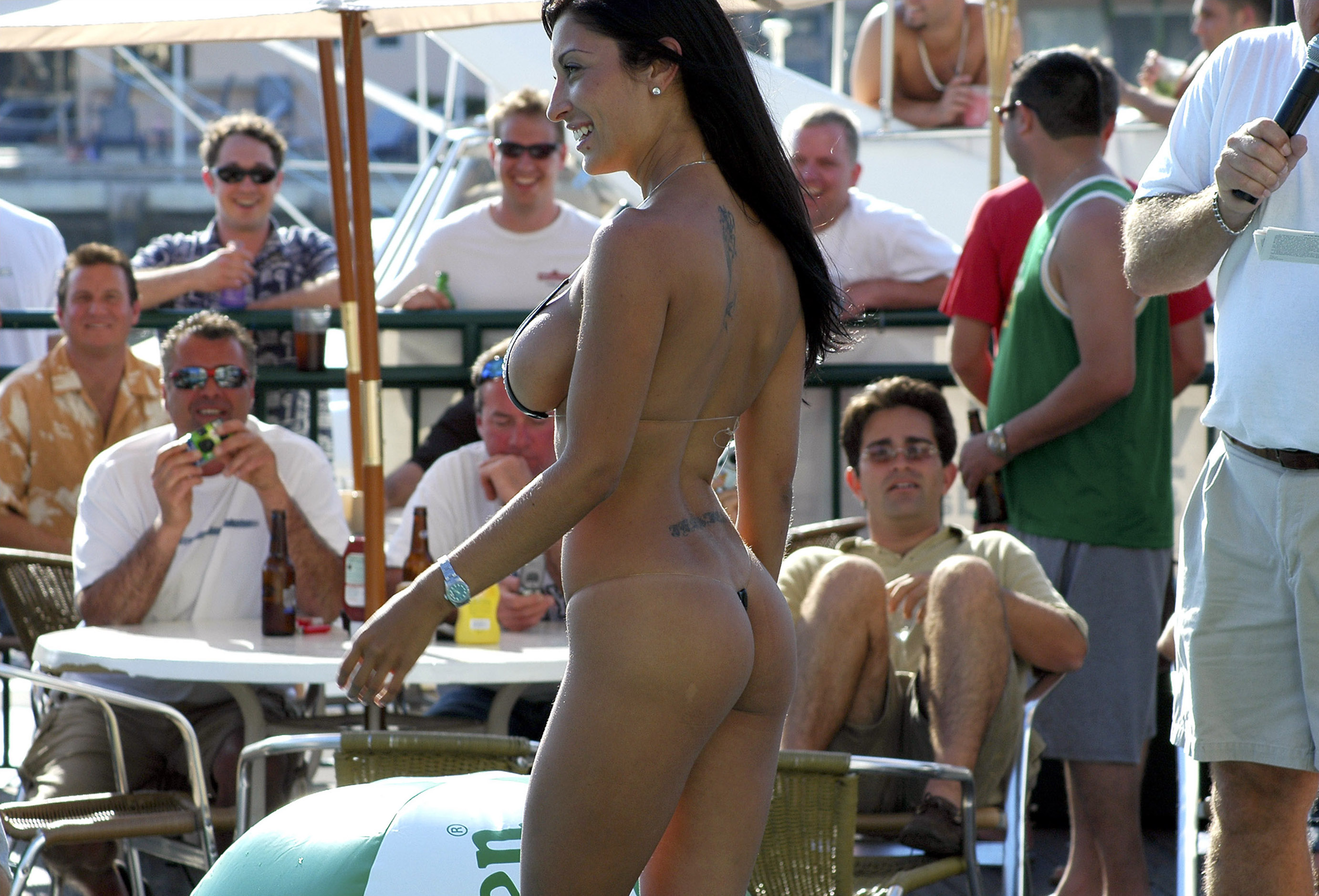
Bikini contest in Florida, 2006

Bikini contests have sometimes been organised or sponsored by companies for marketing purposes or to find new models for their products. Miss Hawaiian Tropic is organized by Playtex to promote "Hawaiian Tropic", its suntan lotion. NOPI runs the annual Hot Import Nights bikini contest, which is held in conjunction with the import car-show in Atlanta, Georgia.

There is also an annual Hooters bikini competition.

Some swimsuit competitions, such as the Miss Bumbum contest, held in Brazil, and the Miss Reef contest, held in several South American countries, focus on the beauty of a single part of body, such as female buttocks.

== Controversies ==
Despite their popularity and women's voluntary participation, swimsuit competitions, especially bikini contests, are sometimes controversial. Critics argue that beauty contests reinforce the idea that girls and women are primarily valued for their physical appearance and pressure them to conform to conventional beauty standards.

=== Miss World contest ===
The first Miss World contest was organized by Eric Morley in 1951 as a promotion for swimwear at the Festival of Britain. The term "Miss World" was coined by the press. After the winner, Sweden's Kiki Håkansson, was crowned while wearing a bikini, countries with religious traditions threatened to withdraw delegates, and the event was condemned by Pope Pius XII. Bikinis were subseqeuntly banned from Miss World beauty pageants, and evening gowns were introduced instead.

Bikinis reappeared in later Miss World contests, drawing further controversy. In the 1970s and 1980s, Miss World was regularly picketed by feminist protesters. At the 1996 Miss World contest in Bangalore, India, dozens of groups opposed the event and claimed it degraded women. In response to the protests, the venue of the swimsuit round was moved to Seychelles. The pageant organizers defended the contest and pointed out that it had raised £300 million for charity since 2000.

In 2013, the Miss World event was hosted by Indonesia, the world's largest Muslim-majority country. The country's top Muslim clerical body, the Indonesian Ulema Council, suggested that the event should be cancelled because it promoted "hedonism, materialism, and consumerism," and was nothing but "an excuse to show women's body parts that should remain covered." The organizers later announced that the bikini would be replaced by one-piece swimsuits and sarongs, traditional beachwear on the resort island of Bali. Pageant Chairwoman Julia Morley explained, "I do not want to upset or get anyone in a situation where we are being disrespectful."

Critics accused the Miss World organizers of caving to extremist pressures. They point out that Bali is a destination for tourists from across the world who often wear minimal swimwear.

Brooke Magnanti argued that the decision to yield to religious fundamentalists was not a victory for feminism:

While no great fan of pageants there's something about this that rubs the wrong way. For some time it's been clear that the interests and tactics of certain types of feminism and certain types of religious fundamentalism not only converge, but seem to complement each other.

Donald Trump, who owned the Miss Universe beauty pageant until it was acquired by William Morris Endeavor, told Fox News: "Well, I own Miss Universe, so I'm actually very happy about it—because if Miss World doesn't have bikinis, their ratings go right down the tubes".

=== Miss Earth ===
Vida Samadzai was the 2003 Afghan contestant for the Miss Earth title. She was severely condemned by both the Afghan authorities and community for seeking the title. Samadzai was born in Afghanistan but raised in the United States. She was living in India at the time of the contest. The Afghan Supreme Court banned swimsuit contests and said that appearing naked in beauty contests is completely un-Islamic and against Afghan tradition, human honour and dignity. Habiba Sarabi, the Afghan women affairs minister, said Samadzai's semi-naked appearance "is not women's freedom but in my opinion is to entertain men". Afghanistan's embassy in Washington DC declared that claims by Afghan American Samadzai to represent Afghanistan were baseless. Samadzai, the second woman to be crowned Miss Afghanistan after Zohra Daoud's crowning in 1972, received a number of death threats and had to be under the protection of the FBI for three months. She said that she was a bit uncomfortable wearing the "70s style red bikini" and was aware of the risks involved.

The organizer of Miss Earth 2017, a Carousel Productions pageant, was criticized for objectifying women when veiled delegates wore swimsuits in the Beauty of Figure and Form segment, which was first introduced in the Miss Philippines Earth 2017 pageant. The event was one of the three preliminary judging segments of the pageant that include Poise and Beauty of Face and Environmental and Intelligence Competition. The pageant organizer defended the "beauty of figure and form" segment, saying that it was intended to promote strict impartiality during pre-judging by focusing on the contestants' curves and execution, rather than the beauty of their faces.

=== Children's bikini contest ===
Miss Tanguita, which translates as "Miss Child Bikini", is held in Barbosa, Santader, Colombia, as an annual part of the "del Rio Suarez" Festival. Its organisers deny allegations that the competition is a camouflage for sexual exploitation. Instead, they describe it as an awareness event about the importance of children's fitness. Activists say that the competition, although legal, abuses the human rights of minors.

== See also ==
- Bikini in popular culture
- Victoria's Secret Fashion Show
- Wet T-shirt contest
