= Awoulaba =

Woman epitomising West African beauty standards

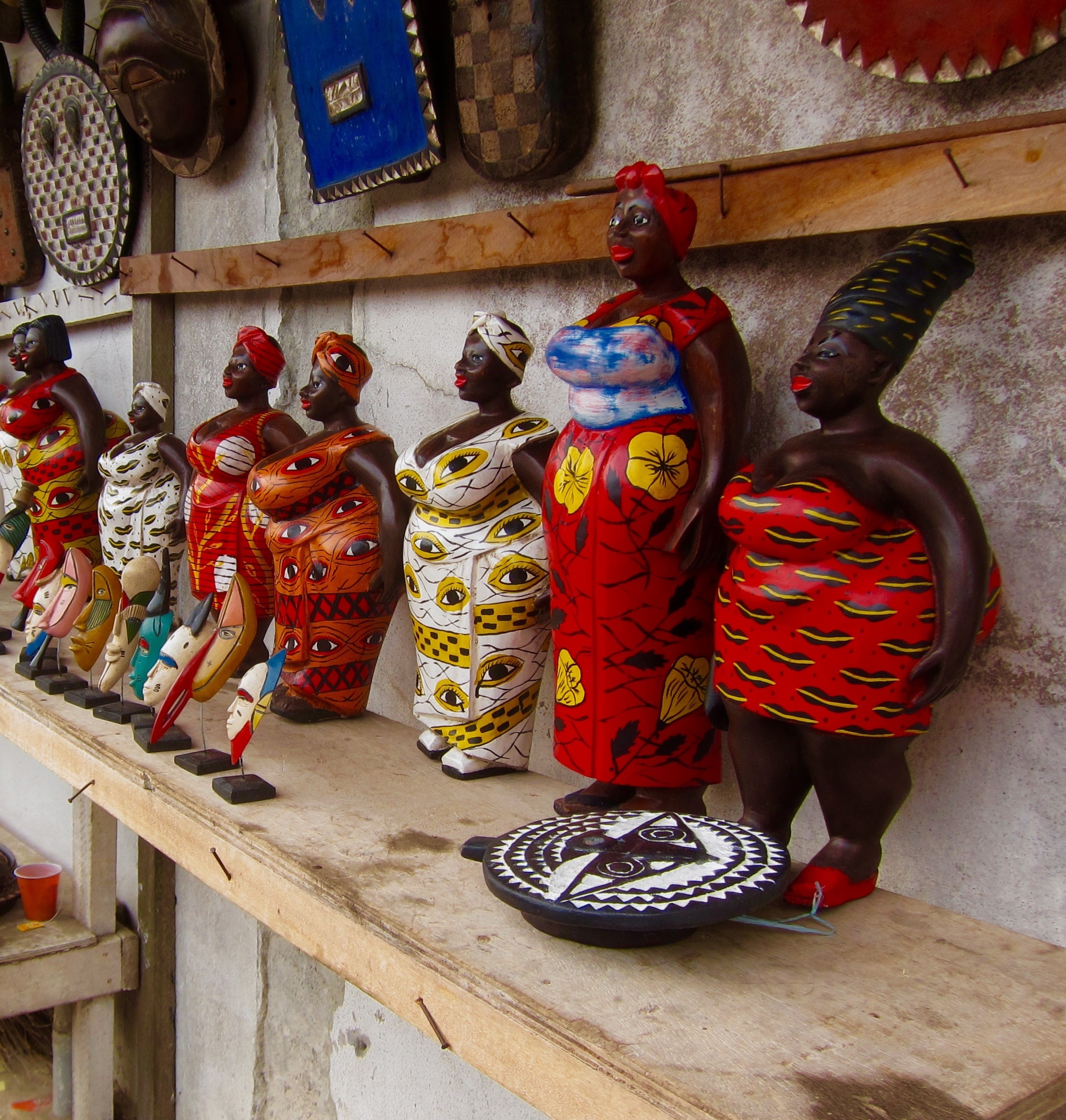
Awoulaba figurines in Ivory Coast

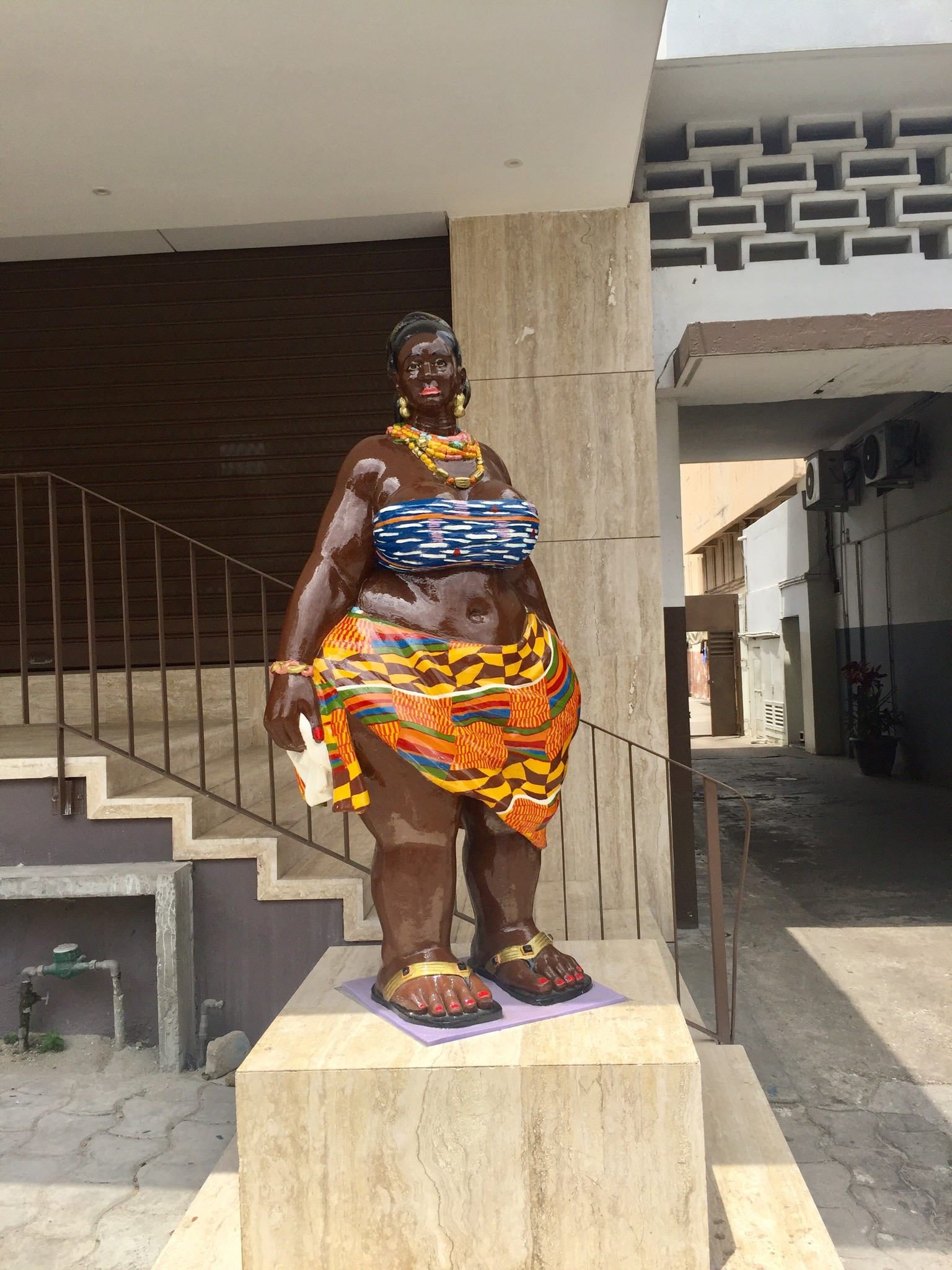
Awoulaba statue in Ivory Coast

Awoulaba is a Baoulé-language term from Ivory Coast meaning "queen of beauty", which refers to women who have plump and curvaceous bodies featuring large buttocks, prominent breasts and wide hips. An Awoulaba is characterized by having buttocks that are visibly fuller and plumper compared to the rest of her body, so that her body resembles a distinctive "guitar shape". Ivorian photographer Joana Choumali describes Awoulaba as "beautiful women of impressive dimensions: a face with fine features, large breasts, a well-defined waist and, above all, big buttocks".

Since 2011, locally manufactured mannequins depicting the Awoulaba body shape have become a familiar sight throughout numerous clothing shops in Abidjan, Ivory Coast and they are distinguished from foreign imported mannequins that depict slim women (described as Taille Fine, meaning "thin waist").

== Miss Awoulaba ==
Miss Awoulaba
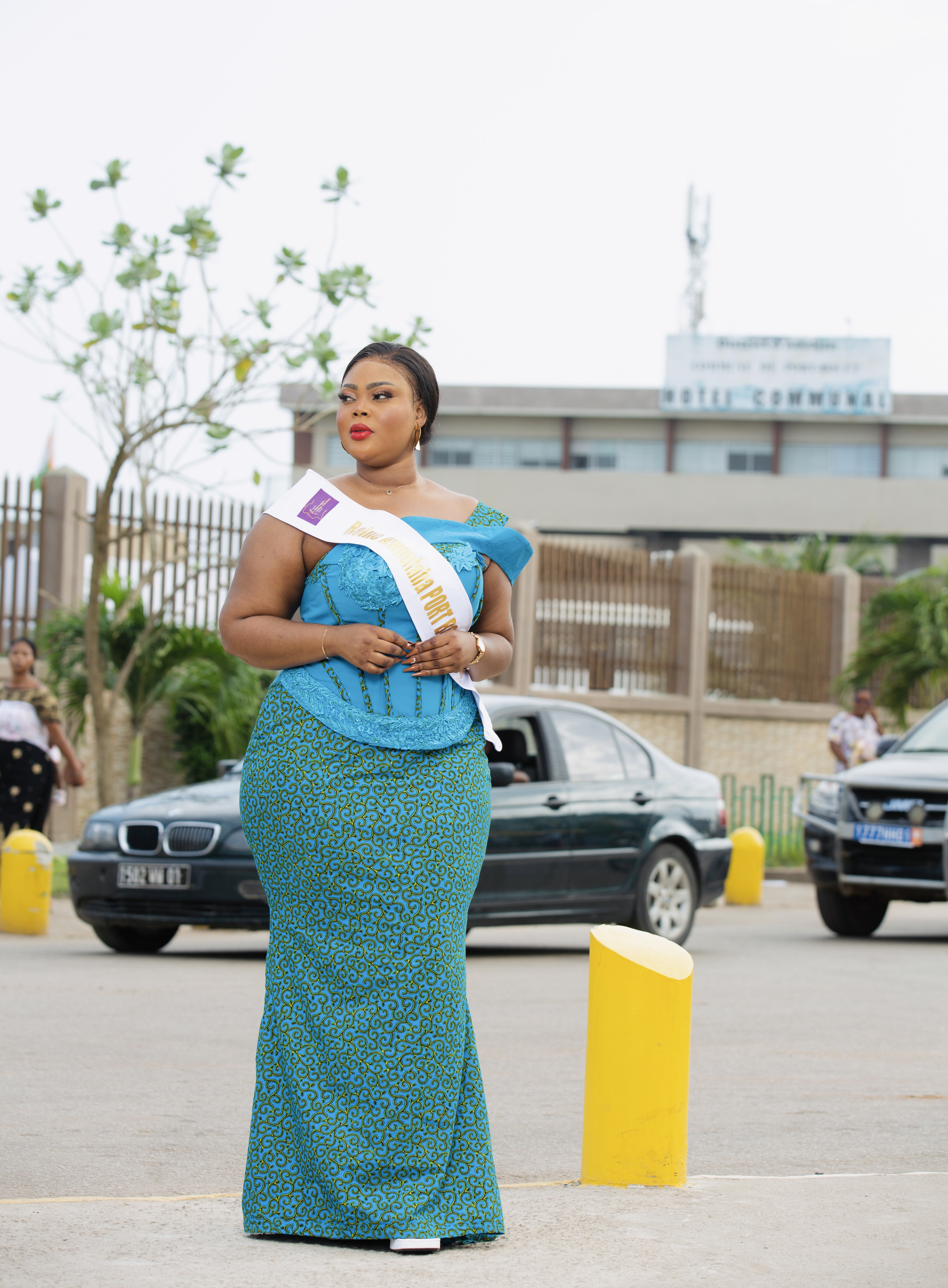
- Contestant for an Awoulaba beauty pageant
- Status: Active
- Genre: Beauty pageant
- Frequency: Annual
- Location: Abidjan
- Country: Ivory Coast

Miss Awoulaba is a beauty pageant that started in Abidjan, Ivory Coast during the early 1980s which was stated to reward "physical harmony and natural charm, with an inclination for women with prominent posteriors" and to showcase "authentic African beauty". Miss Awoulaba was organized as an alternative to Miss Cote d'Ivoire (Miss Ivory Coast), which was accused of favoring Western beauty features. The women of Miss Awoulaba have curvier bodies compared to women of most Western beauty pageants and they are required to wear thick, black hair along with traditional hairstyles and clothing.

=== Prizes ===
First Lady Dominique Folloroux-Ouattara of Ivory Coast offered a cash prize of 5.5 million CFA francs to be shared among the top three winners of the 2015 competition and 1.5 million to the top three winners of the 2017 competition. The top winner of the 2019 competition was promised a Citroën C4 vehicle from Al Moustapha Toure, president of the Collective of Economic Operators of Côte d'Ivoire (COECI). Mayor Jean-Marc Yacé of Cocody offered 4 million CFA francs to be divided among the top three winners of the 2019 competition.

=== Winners ===
- 1999: Bouah Opportune
- 2000: Idah Corneille
- 2001: Diaye Judith
- 2002: Kouamé Adjoua Félicia
- 2007: Dogo Gbaza Roselyne
- 2013: Marie Flore Ozoua Ourigbalé
- 2014: Doukouré Sagnon Millenne
- 2015: Laeticia Ines Kouakou Oussou
- 2016: Tatiana Ahoua Beugré
- 2017: Lehi Marcelle Okobe
- 2018: Stephanie Tapé Lou
- 2019: Yomb Josée Carène
- 2021: Tatiana Marie Alloua Yankey
- 2022: Mafata Bérété
- 2023: Aboya Koua Constance
- 2024: Kouachi Apo Ruth
- 2025: Dje Wohou Anne-Marie
- 2026: Malan Sonia Nadège Epse N'Guessan

== Beauty industry ==
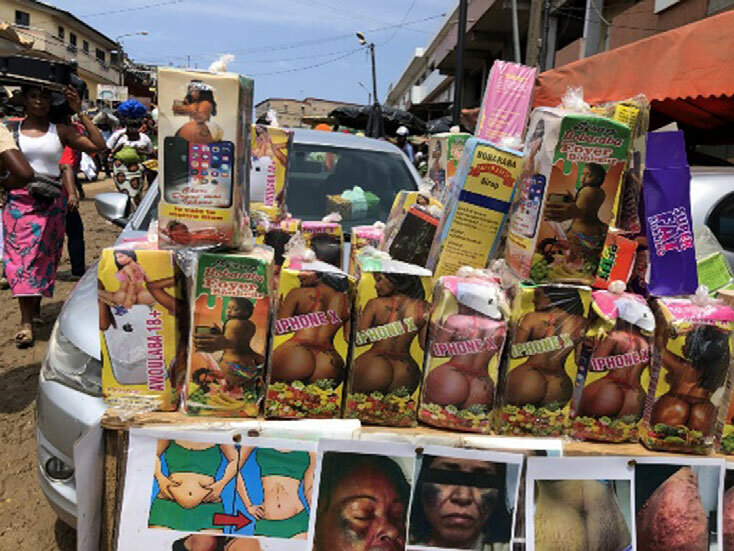
Market stand in Abidjan, Ivory Coast selling "Awoulaba" buttocks-enlargement products

The beauty industry of Ivory Coast provides "Awoulaba" products for women desiring to enlarge their buttocks. Similar products such as creams and pills that are advertised as enhancing the buttocks exist in other West African countries. Also popular are butt augmentation surgeries, as well as padding giving the appearance of larger buttocks. This beauty ideal of a curvier body with larger buttocks has been cited as being a possible factor in the existence of some health risks in West African women such as overweight, obesity, diabetes, high blood pressure, metabolic syndrome, and the use of carcinogenic beauty products.

== See also ==
- Big Beautiful Woman
- Bôtchô
- Fat feminism
- Female body shape
- Feminine beauty ideal
- Miss Bumbum
- Steatopygia
