= Fashionable Lectures =

1750 English pornographic book

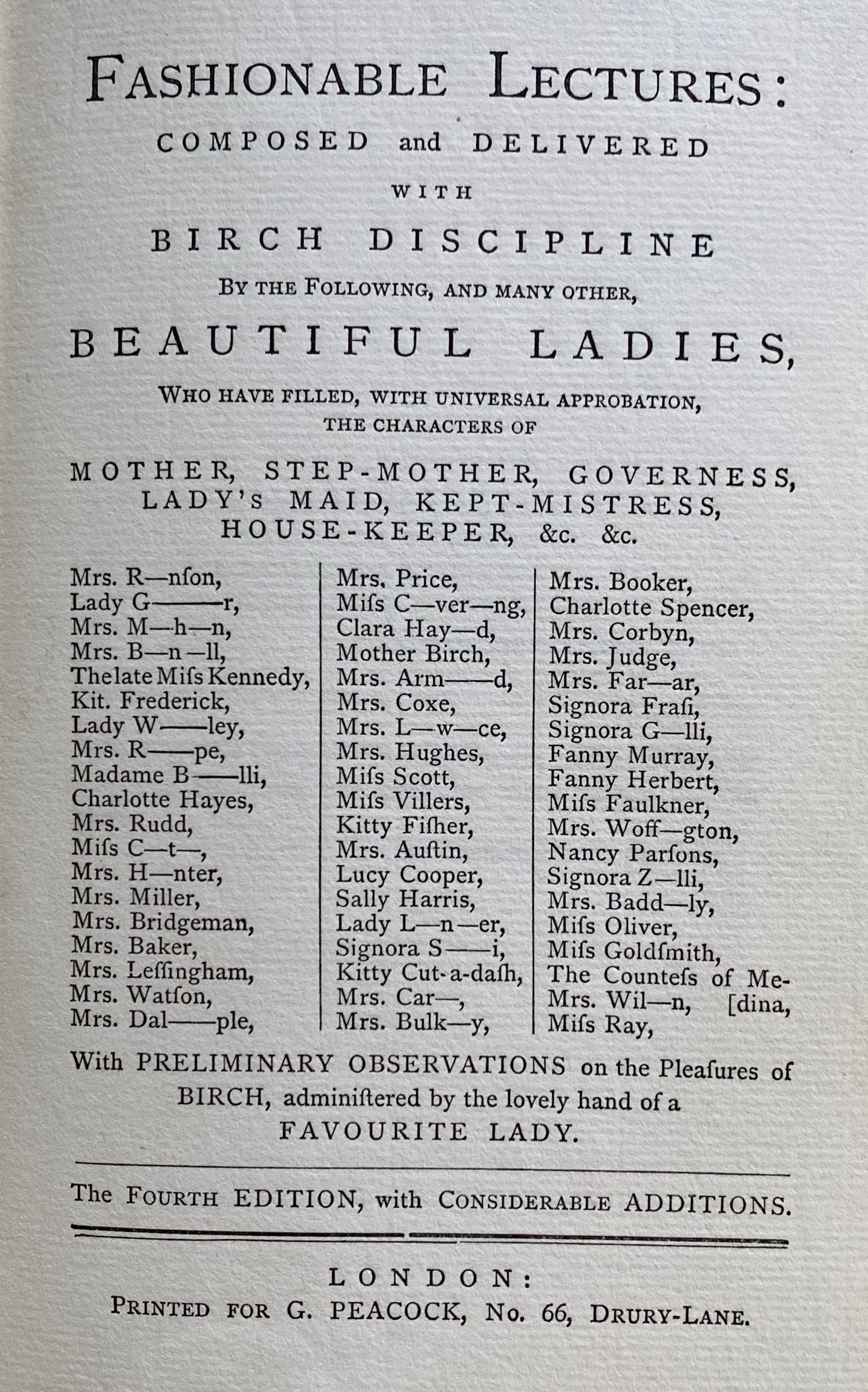
Fashionable Lectures: Composed and Delivered with Birch Discipline

Fashionable Lectures: Composed and Delivered with Birch Discipline was a pornographic book originally published in the 18th century and republished by John Camden Hotten as volume 7 of his series The Library Illustrative of Social Progress around 1872 (falsely dated 1777). Hotten claimed to have found them in the library of Henry Thomas Buckle (1821–1862) but Henry Spencer Ashbee claimed that they were in fact from his collection. The first edition was published around 1750 and again with illustrations by William Holland in the 1780s.

The theme of the work is flagellation by dominant women in positions of authority. It promoted the names of ladies offering the service in a lecture room with rods and cat o' nine tails.
