= The Library Illustrative of Social Progress =

The Library Illustrative of Social Progress was a series of pornographic books published by John Camden Hotten around 1872 (falsely dated 1777). They were mainly reprints of eighteenth-century pornographic works on flagellation. Hotten claimed to have found them in the library of Henry Thomas Buckle (1821–1862) but Henry Spencer Ashbee counterclaimed that they were in fact from his collection.

== Titles ==
Ashbee lists:

- Heinrich Meibom, De Flagorum Usu in re Medica et Venera (A Treatise on the Use of Flogging in Venereal Affairs, 1638)
- Exhibition of Female Flagellants: describing flagellation, mainly of women by women, described in a theatrical, fetishistic style
- Fashionable Lectures: on the theme of flagellation by dominant women in positions of authority
- Female Flagellants (1777) (around 1750)
- Lady Bumtickler's Revels: comic opera on the joys of flagellation
- Madame Birchini's Dance: a long poem in which the heroine cures a man of impotence by flagellation
- The Sublime of Flagellation

Henderson adds:

- The Rodiad
