= Bôtchô =

Bôtchô is a cream sold in Côte d'Ivoire allegedly to increase breast and buttock size, which has become increasingly popular due to the Bobaraba (big bottom) dance.
