= Berkley Horse =

BDSM apparatus

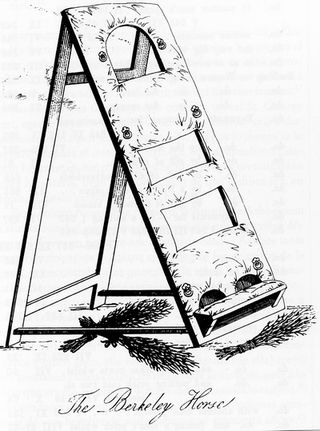
The Berkley Horse

The Berkley Horse is a BDSM apparatus, designed for, and by, Theresa Berkley in 1828. She referred to it as a "chevalet".

== History ==
According to the account of Henry Spencer Ashbee:

A notorious machine was invented for Mrs Berkley to flog gentlemen upon, in the spring of 1828. It is capable of being opened to a considerable extent, so as to bring the body to any angle that might be desirable. There is a print in Mrs Berkley's memoirs, representing a man upon it quite naked. A woman is sitting in a chair exactly under it, with her bosom, belly, and pubic hair exposed: she is manualizing his embolon, whilst Mrs Berkley is birching his posteriors.

He continues:

When the new flogging machine was invented, the designer told her it would bring her into notice, and go by her name after her death; and it did cause her to be talked of, and brought her a great deal of business. [...] The original horse is among the models of the Society of Arts at the Adelphi, and was presented by Doctor Vance, her executor.

In one surviving letter, a customer hearing about the Berkley Horse proffered Theresa Berkley this pricing for her services: "a pound sterling for the first blood drawn, two pounds sterling if the blood runs down to my heels, three pounds sterling if my heels are bathed in blood, four pounds sterling if the blood reaches the floor, and five pounds sterling if you succeed in making me lose consciousness."

The Society of Arts at the Adelphi is now the Royal Society of Arts: they took possession of the Horse in 1837, with public exhibition promoted by radical publisher George Cannon. An illustration of the apparatus is reproduced in the original 1880s edition of Ashbee's Index Librorum Prohibitorum, but omitted from the 1969 reprint. It is unclear whether the original device was preserved by the Royal Society of Arts.

== See also ==
- Erotic furniture
- Wooden horse (device), a torture device
