= The Birchen Bouquet =

Work of pornography

The Birchen Bouquet is a work of pornography first published around 1770, reprinted in 1826 by George Cannon, in 1860 by William Dugdale and again in 1881 by William Lazenby (when it was said to have been printed at Birchington-on-Sea). It consists of a compilation of flagellation stories, mainly of women by women, some taken from The Englishwoman's Domestic Magazine (Marcus notes the curious fact that some material from this fashion magazine was reprinted verbatim in pornographic works). Henry Spencer Ashbee described it as "very ordinary and insipid", expressing surprise at its frequent reprinting.
