= John Petheram =

English antiquarian

- Died: 1858
- Occupation: Antiquarian

John Petheram (died 1858) was an English antiquarian and publisher.

== Biography ==
Petheram issued, under the general title of ‘Puritan Discipline Tracts,’ between 1843 and 1847, from 71 Chancery Lane, London, with introductions and notes, reprints of six rare tracts dealing with the Martin Mar-Prelate controversy of 1589–92. Their titles are: ‘An Epitome,’ ‘An Epistle,’ ‘Pappe with a Hatchet,’ ‘Hay any Worke for Cooper,’ ‘An Almond for a Parrat,’ and Bishop Cooper's ‘Admonition,’ 8vo. He also edited ‘A Brief Discourse of the Troubles begun at Frankfort, 1575,’ London, 1846, sm. 8vo, and a ‘Bibliographical Miscellany,’ 5 pts. (1859, in one vol.). He wrote a useful ‘Historical Sketch of the Progress and Present State of Anglo-Saxon Literature in England,’ London, 1840, 8vo, and ‘Reasons for establishing an Authors' Publication Society,’ 1843, a pamphlet in which he recommended great reductions in the prices of books and publication at net prices only. Petheram afterwards had a secondhand bookseller's shop in Holborn, where he died in December 1858.
