= A Dictionary of Modern Slang, Cant, and Vulgar Words =

English slang dictionary

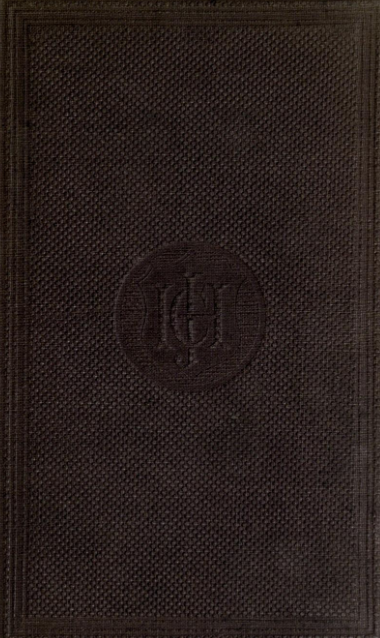
- Author: John Camden Hotten
- Language: English
- Subject: slang
- Publication date: 1859

A Dictionary of Modern Slang, Cant and Vulgar Words is a dictionary of slang originally compiled by publisher and lexicographer John Camden Hotten in 1859.

The first edition was published in 1859, with the full title and subtitle: A dictionary of modern slang, cant, and vulgar words: used at the present day in the streets of London, the universities of Oxford and Cambridge, the houses of Parliament, the dens of St. Giles, and the palaces of St. James : preceded by a history of cant and vulgar language : with glossaries of two secret languages, spoken by the wandering tribes of London, the costermongers, and the patterers. It has also been published as The Slang Dictionary: Etymological, Historical, and Anecdotal.

The dictionary included criminal slang, back slang, rhyming slang, and other types of slang. Its author, Hotten, included histories of some slangs (back slang and rhyming slang), a detailed bibliography, and a noted definition:

Slang represents that evanescent, vulgar language, ever changing with fashion and taste, ... spoken by persons in every grade of life, rich and poor, honest and dishonest ... Slang is indulged in from a desire to appear familiar with life, gaiety, town-humour and with the transient nick names and street jokes of the day ... Slang is the language of street humour, of fast, high and low life ... Slang is as old as speech and the congregating together of people in cities. It is the result of crowding, and excitement, and artificial life. It is often full of the most pungent satire, and is always to the point. Without point Slang has no raison d’etre.

Hotten's work was arguably the most important work on swears since Francis Grose's 1785 Classical Dictionary of the Vulgar Tongue.

== Editions ==
- 1859 – First edition, originally published as by "A London Antiquary"
- 1860 – Second edition
- 1864 – Related text: Illustrations of Slang, Cant, and Vulgar Words
- 1865 – Third edition
- 1872 – Fourth edition
- 1874 – Fifth edition

== References and further research ==
- Julie Coleman, A History of Cant and Slang Dictionaries, Volume III: 1859-1936. Oxford University Press, 2008.
