= Lady Bumtickler's Revels =

- Author: John Camden Hotten
- Language: English
- Publication date: 1872
- Media type: Print

Lady Bumtickler's Revels is a pornographic book written as a spoof libretto for a comic opera on the theme of flagellation. It was written and published by John Camden Hotten in 1872 in his series The Library Illustrative of Social Progress. It purports to have been "performed at Lady Bumtickler's private theatre in Birch Grove, with unbounded applause". The characters, Master Lovebirch and Lady Belinda Flaybum, praise the delights of masochism, for example: "the male sex may taste something exquisitely sweet in a whipping from the hands of a woman".
