= Exhibition of Female Flagellants =

1830 English pornographic novel

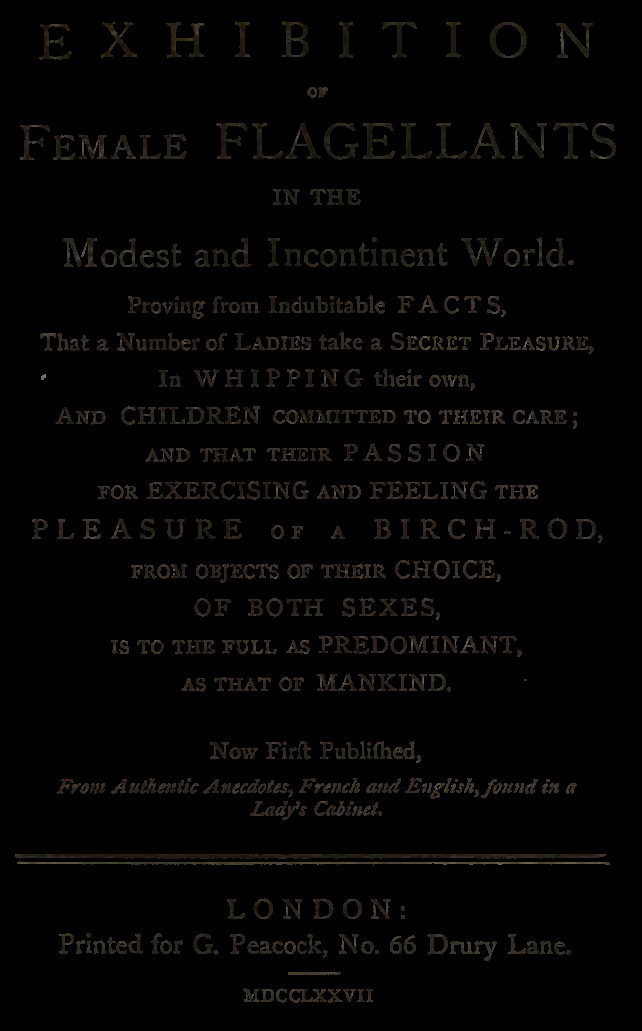
Volume I & II: Exhibition of Female Flagellant

Exhibition of Female Flagellants is an 1830 pornographic novel published by George Cannon in London and attributed, probably falsely, to Theresa Berkley. The principal activity described is flagellation, mainly of women by women, described in a theatrical, fetishistic style. It was republished around 1872 by John Camden Hotten in his series The Library Illustrative of Social Progress, attributed to Theresa Berkley.
