= Theresa Berkley =

British prostitute (died 1836)

Theresa Berkley or Berkeley (died September 1836) was a 19th-century English dominatrix who ran a brothel in Hallam Street, just to the east of Portland Place, Marylebone, London, specialising in flagellation. She is notable as the inventor of the "chevalet" or "Berkley Horse", a BDSM apparatus.

== Career as a dominatrix ==
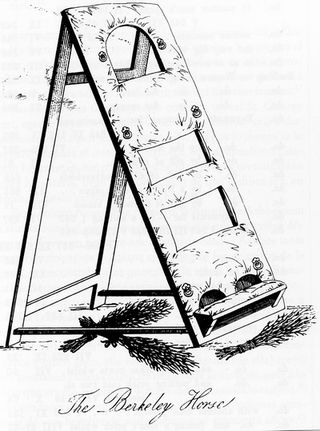
The Berkley Horse

Theresa Berkley ran a high-class flagellation brothel at 28 Charlotte Street (which is today's 84–94 Hallam Street). She was a "governess", meaning she specialised in chastisement, whipping, flagellation, and the like. She invented the "Berkley Horse", an apparatus that reportedly earned her a fortune in flogging wealthy men and women of the time.

There are no artworks depicting what Theresa Berkley looked like, and occasional descriptions usually report that she was attractive, with a strong disposition. An expert with all instruments of torture, her talents became highly sought after by the aristocracy of the day. She was a master of the art of inflicting pain for pleasure, and practised absolute privacy to protect her clientele. Her clients were said to have been both men and women of wealth, and her career was financially lucrative. Berkley's fame was such that the pornographic novel Exhibition of Female Flagellants was attributed to her, probably falsely.

One writer said of her:

She possessed the first requisite of a courtesan, viz., lewdness; for without a woman is positively lecherous, she cannot keep up the affectation of it, and it will soon be perceived that she moves her hands or her buttocks to the tune of pounds, shillings, and pence.

According to an unnamed source quoted by Henry Spencer Ashbee, she used a wide variety of torture instruments, including cat-o'-nine-tails, leather straps, holly brushes, green nettles, and a hook and pulley. Berkley enjoyed a certain amount of torture inflicted on her by her clients, given that they were willing to pay her price, but she also employed a number of women for that task if indeed her clients wished to inflict more pain than she was willing to take herself.

== After her death ==
Shortly after her death in 1836, her brother, who had been a missionary for 30 years in Australia, arrived in England. When he learned the source from which the property she had left him had been derived, he renounced all claim, and immediately went back to Australia. In default, the property was bequeathed to Dr Vance, her medical attendant and executor; but he refused to administer, and the whole estate, valued at £100,000 (equivalent to about £9,875,590 in 2025), was escheated to the crown.

Dr Vance came into possession of her correspondence, several boxes, which was said to have contained letters from the highest aristocracy, both male and female, in the land. The letters are thought to have been destroyed.

== Bibliography ==
- Ashbee, Henry Spencer Ashbee (aka "Pisanus Fraxi") (1969) Index of Forbidden Books (written during the 1880s as Index Librorum Prohibitorum). London: Sphere
- Marcus, Steven (1966) The Other Victorians: a Study of Sexuality and Pornography in Mid-Nineteenth-Century England. London: Weidenfeld & Nicolson ISBN 0-393-30236-9
