= John Camden Hotten =

English bibliophile, lexicographer, and publisher (1832–1873)

John Camden Hotten (12 September 1832, Clerkenwell – 14 June 1873, Hampstead) was an English bibliophile and publisher. He is best known for his clandestine publishing of numerous erotic and pornographic titles.

== Life ==
Hotten was born John William Hotten in Clerkenwell, London to a family of Cornish origins. His father was William Hotten of Probus, Cornwall, a master carpenter and undertaker; his mother was Maria Cowling of Roche, Cornwall. At the age of fourteen Hotten was apprenticed to the London bookseller John Petheram, where he acquired a taste for rare and unusual books. He spent the period from 1848 to about 1853 in America but by mid-1855 had opened a small bookshop in London at 151a Piccadilly and went on to found the publishing business under his own name which after his death became Chatto & Windus.

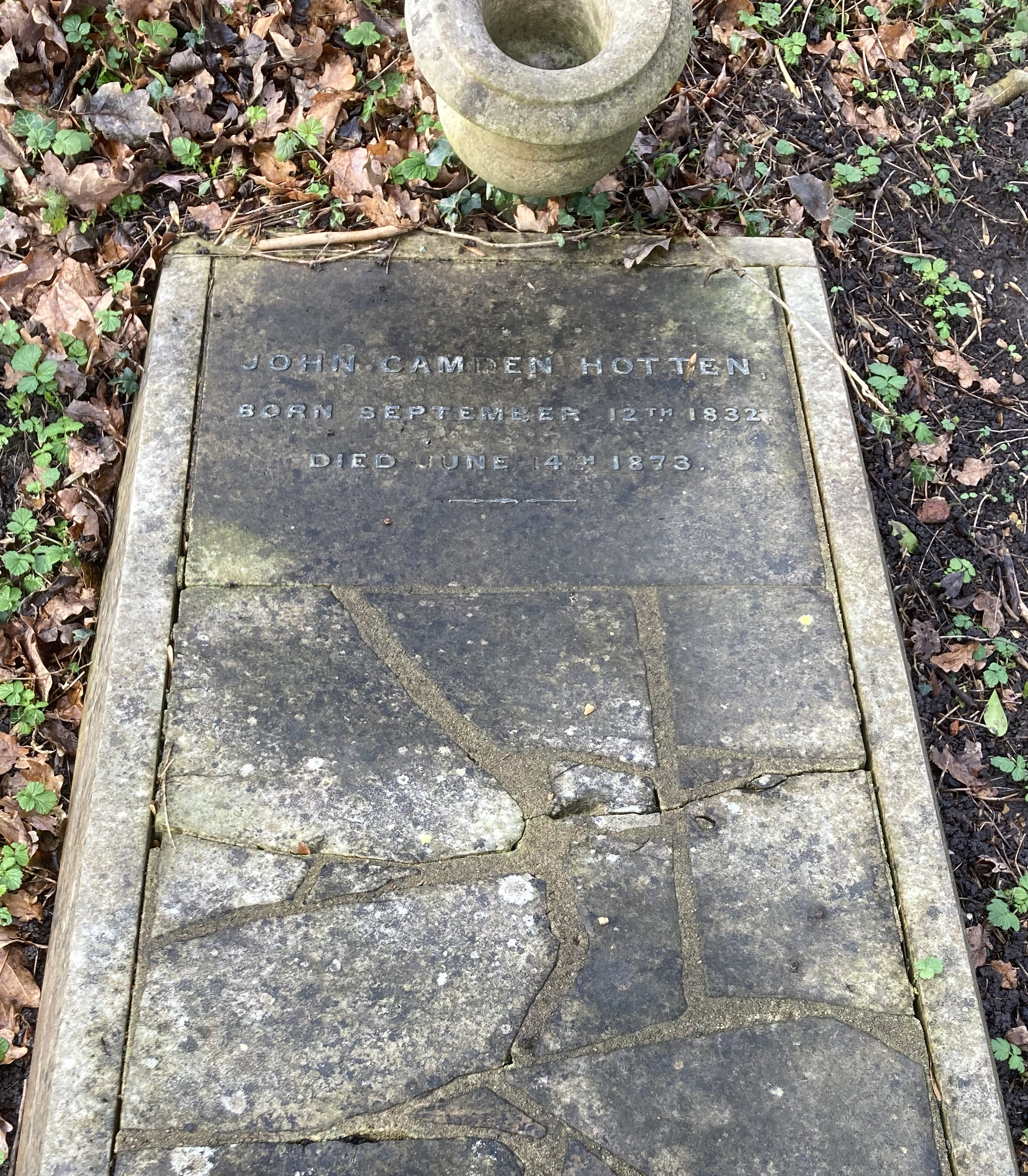
Grave of John Camden Hotten in Highgate Cemetery

Hotten was a member of the Ethnological Society of London, which he joined in 1867. His literary knowledge and intelligence brought him a large circle of acquaintances. He died in Hampstead, 14 June 1873, and was buried on the eastern side of Highgate Cemetery. His publishing business was subsequently bought from his widow by Chatto & Windus.

== Author ==
Hotten was a compiler of an English language dictionary of slang, first published in 1859 under the title A dictionary of modern slang, cant, and vulgar words. The book was reissued posthumously in 1874 and reprinted numerous times. Other works bearing his imprint followed, in the composition of nearly all of which he took some part; many he wrote himself. His most laborious and least-known compilation was the Handbook of Topography and Family History of England and Wales (1863).

Hotten contributed weekly articles of literary news to the Literary Gazette during its last year (1862); to George Godwin's short-lived Parthenon (1862–3); and to the London Review (1863–6). He was author of minor biographies of Thackeray (under the name of Theodore Taylor), 1864, and Dickens, 1870, 1873; the History of Signboards (with Jacob Larwood) (1867); Literary Copyright, Seven Letters Addressed to Earl Stanhope (1871); and The Golden Treasury of Thought. A Gathering of Quotations (1874). Hotten also undertook several translations of Erckmann-Chatrian's works, and edited among many other titles, Sarcastic Notices of the Long Parliament (1863), The Little London Directory of 1677 (1863), and The Original List of Persons who went from Great Britain to the American Plantations, 1600–1700 (1874), which remains important for genealogists today, and was reprinted in 1938, 1962, and 2012. A supplemental list edited by James C. Brandow was published in 1982 under the (shortened) title Omitted Chapters from Hotten's Original Lists…: Census Returns, Parish Registers, and Militia Rolls from the Barbados Census of 1679/80. Hotten's last work was Macaulay the Historian (1873), which was published eight days after his death.

== Publisher ==
Hotten's perseverance established him among the best-known publishers, and he moved to a larger shop. In 1866, the publisher Moxon issued Algernon Charles Swinburne's Poems and Ballads, which brought a charge of indecency and forced Moxon to withdraw the work from circulation. Hotten offered himself as the poet's publisher, and issued the volume in dispute as well as Swinburne's response to his critics. Cecil Lang claims in his preface to Swinburne's Letters that Hotten had effectively blackmailed Swinburne into providing him with pornographic verse. Hotten subsequently published Swinburne's Song of Italy (1867) and William Blake: a Critical Essay (1868).

Hotten was also a collector, author and clandestine publisher of erotica such as The Romance of Chastisement, Exhibition of Female Flagellants and the erotic comic opera Lady Bumtickler's Revels, some in a series entitled The Library Illustrative of Social Progress. Rachel Potter and others claim these are not erotic but pornographic.

Hotten was the first publisher to introduce into England the humorous and other works of American writers, including James Russell Lowell's Biglow Papers, Second Series (1862); Artemus Ward, His Book (1865); Oliver Wendell Holmes's Wit and Humour: Poems (1867 and 1872); Walt Whitman's Poems (1868); Charles Godfrey Leland's Hans Breitmann's Barty and other Ballads (1869); Bret Harte's Lothaw and Sensation Novels (1871); Mark Twain's The Innocents Abroad (1870), Burlesque Autobiography (1871), Eye Openers (ca. 1871), Screamers: a Gathering of Scraps of Humour, Delicious Bits, & Short Stories (1872), and Choice Humorous Works of Mark Twain (1874); and Ambrose Bierce's Nuggets and Dust: Panned Out in California (1872).

== Family ==
Around 1859, Hotten married Charlotte Stringer, by whom he had three daughters.
