= Sadism and masochism in fiction =

The role of sadism and masochism in fiction has attracted serious scholarly attention. Anthony Storr has commented that the volume of sadomasochist pornography shows that sadomasochistic interest is widespread in Western society; John Kucich has noted the importance of masochism in late-19th-century British colonial fiction. This article presents appearances of sadomasochism in literature and works of fiction in the various media.

== Novels ==
Titles are sorted in chronological order.

=== Pre-19th century ===
- Aloisiae Sigaeae, Toletanae, Satyra sotadica de arcanis Amoris et Veneris (1660) by Nicolas Chorier, translated into English as A Dialogue between a Married Woman and a Maid in various editions. depicts an older woman giving sexual instruction to a younger, recommending the spiritual and erotic benefits of a flogging.
- Fanny Hill (1749) by John Cleland – depicts mutual flagellation, between Fanny and an English client. The understanding of flagellation is in transition from an aphrodisiac practice intended to improve sexual performance to a sexual activity in its own right.
- Fashionable Lectures: composed and delivered with Birch Discipline (c. 1750) on the theme of flagellation by dominant women in positions of authority.
- The 120 Days of Sodom (1785), Justine (1791), Philosophy in the Bedroom (1795), and Juliette (1797) by the Marquis de Sade – Have an extreme, sadistic perspective. "The term sadism derives from the Marquis de Sade (1740–1814), a French nobleman imprisoned for his libertinism, and for writing fantastic novels, such as Justine [1797] and Juliette [1797] that equated sexual pleasure with the inflicting of pain, humiliation, and cruelty".
- Anti-Justine (1798) by Nicolas-Edme Rétif – A response to the works of de Sade, written in a like style, describing the opposite political point of view.

=== 19th century ===
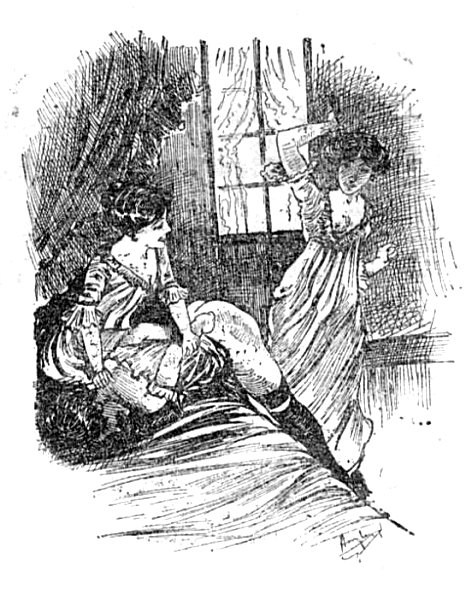
Illustration from Le Magnétisme du Fouet, ou les Indiscrétions de Miss Darcy (1902) by Jean de Villiot. Note this is the French translation of The Romance of Chastisement (1866). Illustrator is unknown, though is possibly William Adolphe Lambrecht.

- The Lustful Turk, or Lascivious Scenes from a Harem (1828) by Anonymous. First published in England by John Benjamin Brookes, the book was not widely known until it was reprinted by William Dugdale in 1893. This tale of sex and sadism consists largely of a series of letters written by its heroine, Emily Barlow, after being abducted by Moorish pirates and held prisoner in an Algerian harem. The David F. Friedman sexploitation film The Lustful Turk (1968) is based on the novel.
- Exhibition of Female Flagellants (1830) attributed, probably falsely, to Theresa Berkley, published by George Cannon. The principal activity described is flagellation, mainly of women by women, described in a theatrical, fetishistic style. It was republished around 1872 by John Camden Hotten.
- The New Ladies' Tickler, or Adventures of Lady Lovesport and the Audacious Harry (1866) by Edward Sellon – dealing with flagellation and lesbian incest
- The Romance of Chastisement (1866) by St George Stock, a probable pseudonym, also credited with The Whippingham Papers (John Camden Hotten: London). A pornographic collection on the theme of flagellation. Reprinted by Charles Carrington in 1902 as The Magnetism of the Rod or the Revelations of Miss Darcy.
- Revelries! and Devilries!! (1867), anonymous, published by William Dugdale. Said to be the collaboration of four Oxford scholars and an army officer. The book is a linked collection of stories in which sadism is a theme.
- Personal Recollections of the Use of the Rod (1868) by "Margaret Anson", pseudonym of British author James Glass Bertram (John Camden Hotten: York, date given as 1857). As is common in this genre, the author/narrator is given as female, and the perpetrators and victims are mainly women. Reprinted by Blue Moon Books in 2000; also published as The Merry Order of St. Bridget. Translated in French as Une société de flagellantes. Réminiscences et révélations d'une soubrette de grande maison (1901) by Jean de Villiot, illustrated by Martin van Maële.
- Flagellation & the Flagellants: A History of the Rod (1868) by "Rev. William Cooper", again James Glass Bertram, a best-seller for Hotten.
- Memoiren einer Sängerin (1868). Translated to French as Les Memoirs d'une chanteuse allemande and to English as Pauline, the Prima Dona or Memoirs of an Opera Singer. Published anonymously but likely authored by Wilhelmine Schröder-Devrient. Originally published after her death in two installments in 1868 and 1875; reprinted often since.
- Venus in Furs (1870) by Leopold von Sacher-Masoch – Autobiographical novel wherein the protagonist encourages his mistress to enslave and mistreat him. Many of Sacher-Masoch's other works contain themes of sadomasochism and female dominance of the male. The term 'Masochism' derives from von Sacher-Masoch's name.
- The Romance of Lust (1873–1876) published by William Lazenby includes flagellation by a governess among a variety of sexual activities, such as incest, orgies, masturbation, lesbianism, fellatio, cunnilingus, gay sex, anal sex, and double penetration.
- The Convent School, or Early Experiences of A Young Flagellant (1876) by "Rosa Coote", pseudonym of the author and publisher, William Dugdale, in which a woman is whipped and tortured by two men.
- Experimental Lecture (1878/9) by "Colonel Spanker", published by Charles Carrington, on sadistic flagellation. The Colonel and his circle have a house in Park Lane where young ladies are kidnapped, humiliated, whipped and raped.
- Miss Coote's Confession (1879–1880), an epistolary serial novella also supposedly by Rosa Coote in The Pearl, a pornographic magazine published by William Lazenby, deals with flagellation at home and at school.
- In The Brothers Karamazov (1880), Fyodor Pavlovitch says,

At Mokroe I was talking to an old man, and he told me: 'There's nothing we like so much as sentencing girls to be thrashed, and we always give the lads the job of thrashing them. And the girl he has thrashed to-day, the young man will ask in marriage to-morrow. So it quite suits the girls, too,' he said. There's a set of de Sades for you! But it's clever, anyway.

- The Mysteries of Verbena House, or, Miss Bellasis Birched for Thieving (1882) by "Etonensis" [pseud.], actually by George Augustus Sala and James Campbell Reddie (co-author of The Sins of the Cities of the Plain).
- The Whippingham Papers (1888) with poetry ascribed to Algernon Charles Swinburne, edited by St. George H. Stock, a probable pseudonym, also credited with The Romance of Chastisement (1866). A collection of Victorian stories and verse about erotic flagellation.
- The Yellow Room (1891) by anonymous (generally attributed to "M. Le Comte Du Bouleau", aka Stanislas Matthew de Rhodes). – Novella about an eighteen-year-old girl educated and disciplined by her stern aunt and uncle. Reprinted along with the novella Letters to a Lady Friend, in Whipped into Shape: Two Classic Erotic Novellas by Renaissance E Books Inc. (2004).
- Gynecocracy: A Narrative of the Adventures and Psychological Experiences of Julian Robinson, by "Viscount Ladywood" [pseud.] (1893), the author recounts his punishment as a boy at the hands of the governess to whom he is sent, along with three female cousins, after having taken indecent liberties with a household maid. Forced to wear girls' clothing as his ordinary attire, Julian, now Julia, is subjected to frequent flagellations, as are his cousins, one of whom he later marries, submitting to her dominance through continued forced feminization and crossdressing.
- Raped on the Railway: a True Story of a Lady who was first ravished and then flagellated on the Scotch Express (1894), anonymous, by Charles Carrington A married woman is raped by a stranger in a locked railway compartment and in a common trope in later Victorian pornography is depicted as ultimately taking pleasure in the act: she is then flagellated by her brother-in-law for the latter transgression. The plot may have been inspired by the real-life case of Colonel Valentine Baker, who was convicted of an indecent assault on a young woman in a railway carriage in 1875. An American adaptation, or plagiarism, was published in New York City under the title Raped on the Elevated Railway, a True Story of a Lady who was First Ravished and then Flagellated on the Uptown Express, illustrating the Perils of Travel in the New Machine Age set in New York.
- A Full and True Account of the Wonderful Mission of Earl Lavender (1895) by John Davidson (London: Ward & Downey). A burlesque on the Decadent movement with private whipping clubs and other flagellatory adventures from noted poet, playwright, and humorist John Davidson.
- Tales of Fun and Flagellation (1896) by Lady Gay Spanker [pseud.]. A diverse collection of anecdotes and stories.
- The Torture Garden (1899) by Octave Mirbeau An allegorical examination of Western society, and of the human condition.
- The Memoirs of Dolly Morton: The Story of A Woman's Part in the Struggle to Free the Slaves, An Account of the Whippings, Rapes, and Violences that Preceded the Civil War in America, with Curious Anthropological Observations on the Radical Diversities in the Conformation of the Female Bottom and the Way Different Women Endure Chastisement (1899) under the pseudonym Jean de Villiot, probably Hugues Rebell or Charles Carrington. Edited and published in London and Paris by Charles Carrington. Another edition was published in Philadelphia in 1904.
- Lashed into Lust: The Caprice of a Flagellator (1899) by Anonymous. – French novel reprinted in 1908 with "James Lovebirch" as author. Reprinted in 2000 by Blue Moon Books (New York).

=== 20th century ===
- "Frank" and I (1902) by Anonymous. Originally published in three volumes in England. Edwardian novel of flagellation pornography. A wealthy young man, who is "a lover of the rod", takes in "Frank", a teenage girl disguised as a boy. A 1983 film was released under the alternative titles Frank and I and Lady Libertine.
- Woman and Her Master (1904) by Jean de Villiot, pseudonym of Georges Grassal – a novel of flagellation erotica translated into English by Charles Carrington from the original 1902 French edition, La Femme et son maître.
- La Flagellation Passionnelle (1906) by Don Brennus Aléra, pseudonym of Paul Guérard. Between 1903 and 1936 he wrote and illustrated around 100 historical and contemporary novels about flagellation and crossdressing petticoat punishment.
- Les Onze Mille Verges (The eleven thousand rods) by Guillaume Apollinaire – written in the 1906–1907 period; the publication is unsigned and undated. Picasso thought this was the finest book he had ever read.
- Sadopaideia: Being the Experiences of Cecil Prendergast Undergraduate of the University of Oxford Shewing How he was Led Through the Pleasant Paths of Masochism to the Supreme joys of Sadism. (1907) by anonymous. – Two-volume tale of a man who experiences both dominance and submission. Anthony Storr attributes it to Algernon Charles Swinburne.
- The Beautiful Flagellants of New York (1907) by Lord Drialys (The Society of British Bibliophiles [Charles Carrington]: Paris) – follows an intrepid traveller's adventures from Chicago to Boston to New York. Originally published in three volumes, one for each city. Reprinted by Olympia Press as The Beautiful Flagellants of Chicago, Boston and New York.
- The Way of a Man with a Maid (ca. 1908) by Anonymous. First published in France, exact date and author unknown. Three-volume Edwardian novel of abduction, sex and sadism. Often reprinted as a single volume under the shorter title A Man with a Maid. Adapted to film in 1975 called What the Swedish Butler Saw.
- La Comtesse au fouet (1908), by Pierre Dumarchey (Pierre Mac Orlan) – the story of a cruel dominatrix who turns the male hero into a "dog-man". Under the pen-name Miss Sadie Blackeyes, he wrote popular flagellation novels such as Baby douce fille (1910), Miss: The memoirs of a young lady of quality containing recollections of boarding school discipline and intimate details of her chastisement (1912), and Petite Dactylo et autres textes de flagellation (1913). And as "Anonymous" wrote Masochists in America (Le Masochisme en Amérique: Recueil des récits et impressions personnelles d'une victime du féminisme) (1905).
- Coups de Fouet (1908) by Lord Birchisgood [pseud.] (Édition Parisienne, Roberts & Dardailons Éditeurs: Paris). Author of Le Tour d'Europe d'un flagellant (1909), et al.
- Les Cinq fessées de Suzette (Five Smackings of Suzette) (1910) by James Lovebirch [pseud.], published in Paris. Author of many popular flagellation novels such as L'Avatar de Lucette (The Misadventures of Lucette), Peggy Briggs, Au Bon Vieux Temps (all from 1913), and The Flagellations of Suzette (1915), Paris: Library Aristique.
- Qui Aime Bien (1912) by Jacques d'Icy, pseudonym of author and artist Louis Malteste (Jean Fort: Paris), illustrated by Malteste. Writer of many books of spanking/whipping erotica such as: Chatie Bien (1913), Monsieur Paulette et Ses Epouses (1921), Paulette Trahie (1922), Brassée de faits (1925), Les Mains Chéries (1927), et al.
- Le règne de la cravache et de la bottine (The Reign of the Riding Crop and the Boot) (1913) by fr:Roland Brévannes, pseudonym of Paul Guérard (Select Bibliothèque: Paris) – humiliating animal roleplay, female-dominated men are forced to crawl about in bear suits. A theme explored in several of his books; in Les Esclaves-montures (Slave Mountings) (1920) and Le Club des Monteurs Humaines (1924), men are turned into obedient cart ponies.
- Fred: The True History of a Boy Raised as a Girl (1913) by Don Brennus Alera, pseudonym of Paul Guérard – classic story of humiliating petticoat punishment (Pinafore eroticism). Followed by the sequels Frederique (1921), Frida (1924), Fridoline (1926), and Lina Frido (1927).
- Ulysses (1918–1920; 1922) by James Joyce employs themes of masochism, especially in the "Circe" section which has multiple allusions to Venus in Furs.
- Two Flappers in Paris (1920) by "A. Cantab" [pseud.] – two young women visiting Paris are lured into a flagellatory brothel.
- L'histoire de l'œil (Story of the Eye) (1928) by Georges Bataille – A short novel.
- Le Dressage de la Maid-Esclave (1930) by Bernard Valonnes, pseudonym of Paul Guérard (Select Bibliothèque: Paris) – two-volume story of women trained as cart-pulling ponygirl slaves.
- Bagne de femmes (Jail for Girls) (1931) by Alan Mac Clyde [pseud.], Librairie Générale: Paris. One of the earliest of dozens of sadomasochistic novels by this unknown author. Followed by Dressage (1931), La Cité de l'horreur (1933), Servitude (1934), Dolly, Esclave (1936), et al.
- Dresseuses d'hommes (1931) by Florence Fulbert (Jean Fort: Paris), illustrated by Jim Black [Luc Lafnet]. Story of men dominated and punished by women.
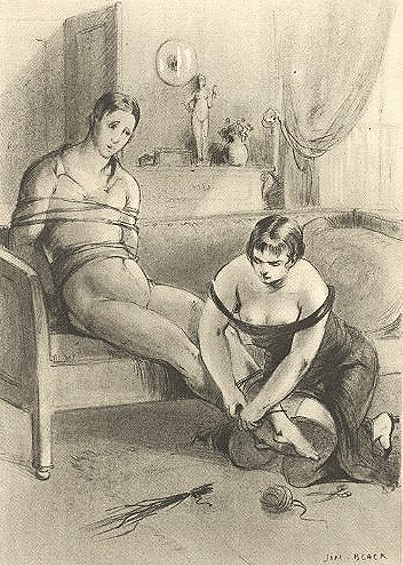
  Luc Lafnet
- La Volupté du Fouet (The Pleasure of the Whip) (1938) by Armand du Loup, illustrated by famous French artist Étienne Le Rallic under the alias R. Fanny.
- Story of O (1954) by Pauline Réage – To prove her love, the protagonist submits to being kept in a château and abused by a group of men, one her official lover. Later, she resumes her normal life, while secretly becoming the property of a friend of her lover's. It was made into a film in 1975.
- The Whip Angels (1955) by XXX or Selena Warfield, pseudonyms of Diane (née de Beauharnais) Bataille, second wife of French writer Georges Bataille (The Olympia Press: Paris) – a pastiche of a Victorian erotic novel.
- L'Image (1956) by Jean de Berg (pseudonym of Catherine Robbe-Grillet). In 1975, it was made into a film, The Image, also titled as The Punishment of Anne.
- The Passionate Lash or The Revenge of Sir Hilary Garner (c. 1957) by Alan McClyde [pseud.] (Pall Mall Press: Paris) – Alan Mac Clyde was a popular house name used for English-language erotic books from the 1950s onward
- The English Governess (Ophelia Press, 1960), revised as Harriet Marwood, Governess (1967) by John Glassco under the pseudonym, "Miles Underwood".
- Gordon (1966) by Edith Templeton – once-banned novel about a woman in postwar London who falls into an intense submissive relationship with a psychiatrist.
- Tarnsman of Gor (1967) by John Norman – first in a series of 35 (as of this date) erotic science fiction novels set on the planet Gor. The novels describe an elaborate culture of sexual master/slave relationships which have spawned a BDSM lifestyle subculture of followers who call themselves Goreans.
- Je... Ils... (1969) by Arthur Adamov – With stories like Fin Août. About Masochism, regarded as an "immunisation against death", but does not aim at erotic arousal.
- Hogg (1969) by Samuel Delany.
- The Marquesa de Sade: Erotic Mistress of Exquisite Evil (1970) by Joseph LeBaron [pseud.] (Hanover House: North Hollywood) – adapted from the film produced by Jaybird Enterprises.
- Gravity's Rainbow (1973) by Thomas Pynchon.
- Memoirs of a Slave (1976) by Rene Michel Desergy (Janus Publications: London) – a typical example of the many books and magazines fetish publisher Janus produced in the 1970s.
- Pagan Sex Orgy (1976) by Randy Palmer (Eros Publishing Co., Inc.: Wilmington, Delaware) – reflects the 1970s revival of occultism in books and film. Cover and illustrations by Bill Ward.
- 9½ Weeks (1978) an erotic memoir by Elizabeth McNeill, later made into the film 9½ Weeks starring Kim Basinger and Mickey Rourke in 1986.
- Spanking the Maid (1982) by Robert Coover
- The Correct Sadist (1983) by Terence Sellers (Grove Press: New York City) – reverses the dominant-submissive roles of The Story of O to create a post-feminist American myth about power.
- Die Klavierspielerin (Reinbeck, 1983) by Elfriede Jelinek, made into the film The Piano Teacher by director Michael Haneke.
- Anne Rice's sadomasochistic writing includes: Exit to Eden (1985), Belinda (1986), and The Claiming of Sleeping Beauty (1983) and its sequels, Beauty's Punishment (1984) and Beauty's Release (1985). The Sleeping Beauty books she wrote as A.N. Roquelaure.
- The Hellbound Heart (1986), by popular horror writer Clive Barker, is a gruesome study of sadomasochism featuring brutal rituals by demonic entities.
- Macho Sluts (1988) by Pat Califia
- Birch in the Boudoir a.k.a. Beauty in the Birch (Blue Moon Books, 1989) by anonymous (Richard Manton). A pastiche written in the style of Edwardian era erotica. The fictional preface claims this was originally published in Paris in 1905. The story is in the form of an exchange of racy letters about the amatory and disciplinary experiences of a new master of an English school for wayward girls and a woman living in an Arabian harem.
- Something Leather (1990) by Alasdair Gray has as its framing story an initiation into sadomasochistic activities by the female operators of a leather clothing shop in Glasgow.
- American Psycho (Vintage, 1991) by Bret Easton Ellis.
- The Wet Forever (1991) by David Aaron Clark, about the sadomasochistic relationship between a grifter named Janus and a dominatrix named Madchen.
- The Ties that Bind (Le Lien) (1993) by Vanessa Duriès.
- Wizard's First Rule (1994) by Terry Goodkind features the Mord-Sith; women who live to torture and condition men into obedient pets that live and breathe to please them.
- Matriarchy: Freedom in Bondage, 1997 by Malcolm McKesson (An Outsider artist) – A boy undergraduate student in Harvard college is dominated by his mistress, and forced to dress as a woman.
- Killing Me Softly (1999) by Nicci French. Made into a film of the same name in 2002 starring Heather Graham.
- Mark Ramsden's three novels The Dark Magus and the Sacred Whore, The Dungeonmaster's Apprentice (Serpent's Tail, both 1999) and The Sacred Blood (Serpent's Tail, 2001) are a darkly comic series of thrillers about the occult, fetishism and the BDSM scene.

=== 21st century ===
- The Marketplace (2000–2001), a series of novels by Laura Antoniou.
- Kushiel's Dart (2001) by Jacqueline Carey – A dual-genre work, belonging to fantasy fiction and BDSM fiction, along with its sequels.
- Role Plays (2003) by Andrei Gusev – a collection of BDSM stories and short stories. Themes include female domination, bondage, erotic spanking and BDSM fiction.
- The Girl with the Dragon Tattoo (2005) by Stieg Larsson is a popular mystery-thriller that features scenes of sadism, sodomy, and torture. The two films adapted from it, by Niels Arden Oplav and David Fincher also depicted scenes that made the book controversial.
- Fifty Shades of Grey (2011) by E. L. James begins a best-selling trilogy of novels followed by the sequels Fifty Shades Darker (2011), and Fifty Shades Freed (2012). There are also films based on the novels. However, the novels and films have been criticized for their inaccurate and harmful depiction of BDSM.
- Never the Face (2011) by Ariel Sands, an account of a dominant-submissive relationship that descends into abuse between a man and a woman named only as "Kitten" or "Bitch".

== Mainstream films ==
The following films feature BDSM as a major plot point.

Dramas:

- The Whip and the Body (La Frusta e il Corpo) (1963), directed by Mario Bava and starring Christopher Lee and Daliah Lavi
- The Embryo Hunts In Secret (1966), Japanese film directed by Kōji Wakamatsu
- Belle de jour (1967), directed by Luis Buñuel and starring Catherine Deneuve
- De Sade (1969), directed by Cy Endfield and starring Keir Dullea and Senta Berger
- Venus in Furs (1969), directed by Massimo Dallamano and starring Laura Antonelli and Régis Vallée
- Marquis de Sade: Justine (1969), directed by Jess Franco
- The Libertine (La Matriarca) (1968)
- Eugenie… The Story of Her Journey into Perversion (1970), directed by Jess Franco
- The Laughing Woman, aka Femina Ridens, The Frightened Woman (1969), directed by Piero Schivazappa
- Eugenie de Sade (1970), another Jesus Franco adaptation of de Sade
- Daughters of Darkness, (Le Rouge aux Lèvres) (1971), directed by Harry Kümel and starring Delphine Seyrig and John Karlen
- The Nightcomers (1971), directed by Michael Winner and starring Marlon Brando and Stephanie Beacham
- Last Tango in Paris (1972), directed by Bernardo Bertolucci and starring Marlon Brando and Maria Schneider
- Justine de Sade (1972), directed by Claude Pierson
- The Bitter Tears of Petra von Kant (Die bitteren Tränen der Petra von Kant) (1972) directed by Rainer Werner Fassbinder
- The Punishment (La punition) (1973) directed by Pierre-Alain Jolivet
- Flower and Snake (花と蛇 - Hana to Hebi) (1974), directed by Masaru Konuma and starring Naomi Tani
- The Night Porter, (Il Portiere di notte) (1974), directed by Liliana Cavani and starring Dirk Bogarde and Charlotte Rampling
- School of the Holy Beast (1974), nunsploitation classic starring Yumi Takigawa
- Wife to Be Sacrificed (生贄夫人 - Ikenie Fujin) (1974), directed by Masaru Konuma and starring Naomi Tani
- Story of O (Histoire d'O) (1975), directed by Just Jaeckin and starring Corinne Cléry
- The Image (The Punishment of Anne) (1975), directed by Radley Metzger
- Salò, or the 120 Days of Sodom (Salò o le 120 giornate di Sodoma) (1975), directed by Pier Paolo Pasolini
- In the Realm of the Senses (1976), directed by Nagisa Oshima
- Maîtresse (1976), directed by Barbet Schroeder starring Gérard Depardieu and Bulle Ogier
- Blood Sucking Freaks (The Incredible Torture Show) (1976)
- Sadomania (1981), directed by Jess Franco
- Lady Libertine (Frank and I) (1983), directed by Gérard Kikoïne and starring Sophie Favier
- A Woman in Flames (Die Flambierte Frau) (1983)
- Crimes of Passion (1984), directed by Ken Russell and starring Kathleen Turner and Anthony Perkins
- Seduction: The Cruel Woman (Verführung: Die grausame Frau) (1985)
- Blue Velvet (1986), written and directed by David Lynch and starring Kyle MacLachlan, Isabella Rossellini, Dennis Hopper and Laura Dern
- 9½ Weeks (1986), directed by Adrian Lyne and starring Kim Basinger and Mickey Rourke
- S&M Hunter (1986)
- Tras el cristal (1986)
- Marquis de Sade's Prosperities of Vice (1988), Japanese "pink" film by Akio Jissoji
- Life Is Sweet (1990), directed by Mike Leigh
- Singapore Sling (1990), directed by Nikos Nikolaidis
- Tie Me Up! Tie Me Down! (1990), directed by Pedro Almodóvar and starring Antonio Banderas and Victoria Abril
- Tokyo Decadence (Topazu) (1991), directed by Ryu Murakami and starring Miho Nikaido
- Bitter Moon (1992), directed by Roman Polanski and starring Hugh Grant, Kristin Scott Thomas, Emmanuelle Seigner, and Peter Coyote
- Spanking Love (1994)
- Venus in Furs (1994)
- Breaking the Waves by Lars von Trier (1996)
- Conspirators of Pleasure (1996), directed by Jan Švankmajer
- The Bondage Master (1996), a Japanese indie film directed by Keisuke Konishi
- Of Freaks and Men (Pro urodov i lyudej) (1998)
- Lies (Gojitmal) (1999)
- Moonlight Whispers (Sasayaki) (1999)
- Romance (Romance X) (1999), directed by Catherine Breillat and starring Caroline Ducey and Rocco Siffredi
- Quills (2000), directed by Philip Kaufman and starring Geoffrey Rush, Kate Winslet, Joaquin Phoenix and Michael Caine
- The Piano Teacher (La Pianiste) (2001), directed by Michael Haneke and starring Isabelle Huppert and Benoît Magimel
- Secretary (2002), directed by Steven Shainberg and starring James Spader and Maggie Gyllenhaal
- Bettie Page: Dark Angel (2004), a biopic starring Paige Richards
- Going Under (2004)
- The Passion of Life (2005)
- A Year Without Love (Un año sin amor) (2005), directed by Anahi Berneri
- The Zero Years (2005), directed by Nikos Nikolaidis
- The Notorious Bettie Page (2006), a biopic directed by Mary Harron and starring Gretchen Mol in the title role
- Hounded (Verfolgt) (2007), directed by Angelina Maccarone
- New Tokyo Decadence – The Slave (2007), directed by Osamu Satō and starring Rinako Hirasawa and Kikujiro Honda
- Antichrist (2009), directed by Lars von Trier
- Pimp (2010), British thriller with Robert Cavanah as a Soho pimp
- Leap Year (Año bisiesto) (2010), Mexican drama directed by Michael Rowe
- A Dangerous Method (2011), directed by David Cronenberg, starring Keira Knightley, Viggo Mortensen and Michael Fassbender
- Nymphomaniac, Volume II (2013), directed by Lars von Trier
- Venus in Fur (La Vénus à la fourrure) (2013), directed by Roman Polanski, is based upon the 2011 two-person play, Venus in Fur, by David Ives
- The Duke of Burgundy (2014), directed by Peter Strickland
- Fifty Shades of Grey (2015), directed by Sam Taylor-Johnson
- Professor Marston and the Wonder Women (2017), biopic of Wonder Woman creator William Moulton Marston
- Dogs Don't Wear Pants (2019), directed by J-P Valkeapää, starring Pekka Strang and Krista Kosonen
- Sanctuary (2022), directed by Zachary Wigon, starring Margaret Qualley and Christopher Abbott
- Babygirl (2024), directed by Halina Reijn, starring Nicole Kidman and Harris Dickinson

Comedy:

- The Choirboys (1977), directed by Robert Aldrich
- Eating Raoul (1982), directed by Paul Bartel and starring Mary Woronov
- Personal Services (1987), directed by Terry Jones and starring Julie Walters
- Exit to Eden (1994), directed by Garry Marshall and starring Rosie O'Donnell and Dan Aykroyd
- Preaching to the Perverted (1997), directed by Stuart Urban and starring Guinevere Turner and Christien Anholt
- Tomcats (2001)
- EuroTrip (2004) Lucy Lawless plays dominatrix Madame Vadersexxx in a segment of the movie.
- Walk All Over Me (2007), starring Tricia Helfer as a dominatrix and Leelee Sobieski
- Modern Love is Automatic (2009), bored nurse moonlights as a dominatrix

Thrillers/Horrors:

- Videodrome (1983), written and directed by David Cronenberg and starring James Woods and Deborah Harry
- Tightrope (1984), directed by Richard Tuggle and starring Clint Eastwood and Geneviève Bujold
- Hellraiser (1987), an American horror film written and directed by Clive Barker, starring Andrew Robinson and Clare Higgins
- Basic Instinct (1992), directed by Paul Verhoeven and starring Michael Douglas and Sharon Stone
- Body of Evidence (1993), directed by Uli Edel and starring Madonna and Willem Dafoe
- Strangeland (1998), Directed by John Pieplow, written by and starring musician Dee Snider of Twisted Sister
- 8 mm (1999), directed by Joel Schumacher and starring Nicolas Cage and Joaquin Phoenix
- The Cell (2000), directed by Tarsem Singh
- Ichi the Killer (2001), directed by Takashi Miike
- Killing Me Softly (2002), directed by Chen Kaige

== Television ==
- Full Exposure: The Sex Tapes Scandal (1989), made-for-TV film. Police investigate underground S&M clubs looking for a serial killer. Vanessa Williams plays a hooker/dominatrix who videotapes her clients.
- Mercy (film) (2000) HBO cable-television movie starring Ellen Barkin and Peta Wilson. Murder mystery leads to a secret S&M society.
- Secret Diary of a Call Girl (2007); in the fourth episode, "Belle" (Billie Piper) takes BDSM lessons from a professional dominatrix as a favor for her accountant who is a closet submissive.
- Dollhouse (2009); the beginning of the 9th episode shows Echo (Eliza Dushku), returning from an assignment as a leather-clad whip-wielding dominatrix.
- The FOX series The Inside episode "Old Wounds" dealt exclusively with S&M, and was criticized by the Parents Television Council as a result.
- The television series CSI: Crime Scene Investigation has featured Melinda Clarke as professional dominatrix Lady Heather in six episodes, most notably in the 90-minute special episode "Lady Heather's Box".
- Season 4 of HBO series Six Feet Under features a character (Joe) who wants to adopt a submissive sexual role in his relationship with Brenda.
- A Family Guy gag (from the episode "Let's Go to the Hop") depicts main characters Lois and Peter suiting up for a sadomasochistic session while having a mundane conversation about how wholesome their children are, and why they can be trusted. Toys have been made of this scene. In the audio commentary for that episode it is noted that such a practice seemed normal to them.
- Rex Van de Kamp of Desperate Housewives was unveiled as a lover of S&M, much to the disgust of his wife, Bree. In Come Back to Me, Sharon Lawrence plays Maisy Gibbons, a dominatrix who walks across Rex's back in stiletto heels.
- Season 2 of NBC's Friday night drama Homicide: Life on the Street, in the episode "A Many Splendored Thing". Detectives Bayliss and Pembleton investigate a murder in the S&M club scene. Bayliss expresses his disgust at the 'perversion', but the episode ends with his return to a leather shop, where he purchases a studded and belted leather jacket. This episode is the beginning of the character's sexual awakening, as he becomes comfortable with his bisexual feelings.
- Castle, "The Mistress Always Spanks Twice" (ABC, season 2, episode 16, 2010): a murder investigation leads to the underground world of the professional dominatrix.
- HBO's series, The Sopranos, features multiple characters who engage in sadomasochism.
  - In The Sopranos episode, "Mergers and Acquisitions", Valentina La Paz reports, in disgust, to Tony Soprano that in lieu of having conventional sexual relations, Soprano family mob captain, Ralph Cifaretto, asks her to scrape a cheese grater across his back and pour hot candle wax on his testicles.
- In the anime and manga Gintama, characters Sogo Okita and Sarutobi Ayame often practice sadism and masochism respectively.
- In the manga Nana to Kaoru by Amazume Ryuta, the protagonista Nana and Kaoru are shown to be in an SM relationship to help Nana with her "breathers". It also depicts different cultural practices related to SM. The manga has been adapted to into OVAs and live-action television movies.
- Kakegurui – Compulsive Gambler, features Midari Ikishima, a crazed and mentally unstable student with sadistic, masochistic and suicidal tendencies.
- Konosuba features Darkness, a masochistic crusader who dreams of being ravaged by monsters as well and marrying an abusive alcoholic husband. Ironically, she hates being called by her first name.
- American Horror Story: Asylum – FX network series about an insane asylum in 1964 run by a sadistic nun, Sister Jude (Jessica Lange). In "Welcome to Briarcliff" (episode 2:1, 2012) and "Tricks and Treats" (2:2) she canes a male patient. In "Unholy Night" (2:8), a deranged male patient gets revenge for being beaten (seen in brief flashback) by caning Sister Jude.
- On the third season of Boardwalk Empire (2012), the main antagonist of the show Gyp Rosetti (as portrayed by Bobby Cannavale) was seen besottedly taking pleasure by engaging in sadomasochistic sexual acts (female domination) and autoerotic asphyxiation.
- Bonding (2019) – Netflix series about a psychology student moonlighting as a dominatrix who recruits her gay best friend from high school as her reluctant assistant.

== Stage ==
- Thomas Shadwell's play The Virtuoso (1676) includes an old libertine named Snarl who entreats a prostitute, Mrs Figgup, to bring out the birch rods. It is unclear if he is to flog her or be flogged.
- Sodom, or the Quintessence of Debauchery (1684), an obscene Restoration closet drama thought to be by John Wilmot, 2nd Earl of Rochester.
- In Thomas Otway's play Venice Preserv'd (1682), Act III, Scene i, an old senator, Antonio, visits the house of Aquilina, a Greek courtesan. Antonio pretends to be a bull, then a frog, begging her to spit on him, and then a dog, biting her legs. She whips him, then throws him out and tells her footmen to keep him out.
- Jean Genet's play The Maids (1947) concerns two maids who play out dominant and submissive roles.
- Genet's play The Balcony (1957) is set in a brothel where clients and staff perform various fetishized roles while a revolution brews outside.
- Venus in Fur (2011) is a two-person play by David Ives set in modern New York City.

== Poetry ==
- The Rodiad (1871), a pornographic poem on the subject of flagellation, falsely attributed to George Colman the Younger: probably by Richard Monckton Milnes, 1st Baron Houghton.
- Algernon Charles Swinburne wrote poetry on erotic flagellation, some of which was published anonymously in The Whippingham Papers (ca. 1888).
- Squire Hardman (1967) by John Glassco, purporting to be a reprint of an 18th-century poem by George Colman the Younger, is a long poem in heroic couplets on the theme of flagellation.

== Music ==
- "The Masochism Tango" (1959) by Tom Lehrer uses the powerful rhythm of tango music and iconic implements like castanets and roses to comedic effect.
- "Venus in Furs" (1966) by The Velvet Underground takes its title and subject matter from the 1870 novella of the same name by Leopold von Sacher-Masoch. It is quite possibly the first pop song to detail an S&M encounter and relationship in explicit, unequivocal terms.
- "Little Toy Soldier" (1967) by David Bowie is an early, unreleased track which recites lyrics from the Velvet Underground's "Venus in Furs" as part of its chorus; although the song's humorous treatment of S&M owes more to the cockeyed psychedelia of Syd Barrett.
- "I Wanna Be Your Dog" (1969), "Dirt" (1970) and "Gimme Danger" (1973) by The Stooges all clearly indicate powerful masochistic tendencies and behavior on the part of the singer, Iggy Pop.
- "Submission" (1976) by The Sex Pistols is a song which uses wordplay ("submission" as short for "submarine mission") to convey the ambiguities of an obsessive S&M relationship, albeit obliquely.
- "Whips & Furs" and "I Need a Slave" (both 1977) by The Vibrators are two classic London punk-era songs which address the topic of recreational S&M.
- "Bobby Brown" from 1979's Sheik Yerbouti by Frank Zappa is a narrative of a man who transforms from a misogynist teenager to a BDSM-practicing homosexual disc jockey after an unpleasant encounter from Freddie, a woman's rights activist.
- "Whip in My Valise" (1979) by Adam and the Ants expresses a fascination with S&M play in fairly explicit terms; many of Adam Ant's other early songs of the 1970s, such as "Rubber People", "B-Side Baby", "Ligotage" and "Beat My Guest", also describe similar kinds of sexual fetishes.
- "Melt!" (1982) by Siouxsie and the Banshees describes an intense romantic relationship in terms evocative of an S&M encounter.
- "Twisted Little Sister" (1983) & "The Whip" (1984) by Savatage
- "Master and Servant" (1984) by Depeche Mode
- "Pleasureslave" (1988) by Manowar
- "Bed of Nails" (1989) by Alice Cooper
- "Pretty Tied Up" (1991) by Guns N' Roses
- "Happiness in Slavery" (1992) by Nine Inch Nails takes its title and refrain from Jean Paulhan's preface to Story of O. Also 1994's "Closer" dealt with the subject, as well as the visually provocative video, which showed images of lead singer Trent Reznor tied up and blind-folded.
- "Dominated Love Slave" (1992) by Green Day, lyrics by Tré Cool, told from the point of view of a submissive masochist.
- "Fetish" and "Baby Blue" (both 1999) by Joan Jett and the Blackhearts are two songs focused on this theme.
- The video for "Missile" (2004) by IAMX shows Chris Corner first bound-down to a chair and then handcuffed with leather straps while his ex-girlfriend Sue Denim acts as a dominatrix.
- "Ich Tu Dir Weh" (2009) by Rammstein contains fairly extreme examples of S&M, enough to get it banned from public display or sale to minors in Germany in November 2009 by the Federal Office for the Examination of Media Harmful to Young People (Bundesprüfstelle für jugendgefährdende Medien). After a hearing, the ban was lifted in 2010. Several other songs by the band have also dealt with BDSM themes, such as "Feuerräder" and "Bück Dich".
- "S&M" (2011) by Rihanna from her album Loud.
- British electronic singer Andi Fraggs released a single "Eroction" in 2011 which heavily featured sadomasochism in its lyrics. Limited 100 CD copies were dispatched to UK S&M clubs in a PVC sleeve.
- Madonna also embraced the S&M aesthetic and content in much of her music. Firstly, 1990's "Justify My Love" dealt with submission and sadomasochism both in the song and its controversial accompanying video. Then again in 1992 with her best-selling, widely notorious publication Sex and her coinciding album Erotica. The title track was accompanied again by another scandalous and provoking music video.

== Opera ==
- Lady Bumtickler's Revels (1872), a comic opera on the theme of flagellation written and published by John Camden Hotten.

== See also ==
- Fetish magazine
- BDSM in culture and media
- List of dominatrices in popular culture
- Marquis de Sade in popular culture
