= Alan Mac Clyde =

Alan Mac Clyde is a pseudonym used by two different writers of erotic fiction:

- Alan Mac Clyde (1930s novelist), author of French-language erotic fiction active in the 1930s
- Alan Mac Clyde (1950s novelist), author of English-language erotic fiction active in the 1950s
