= Hector France =

French writer

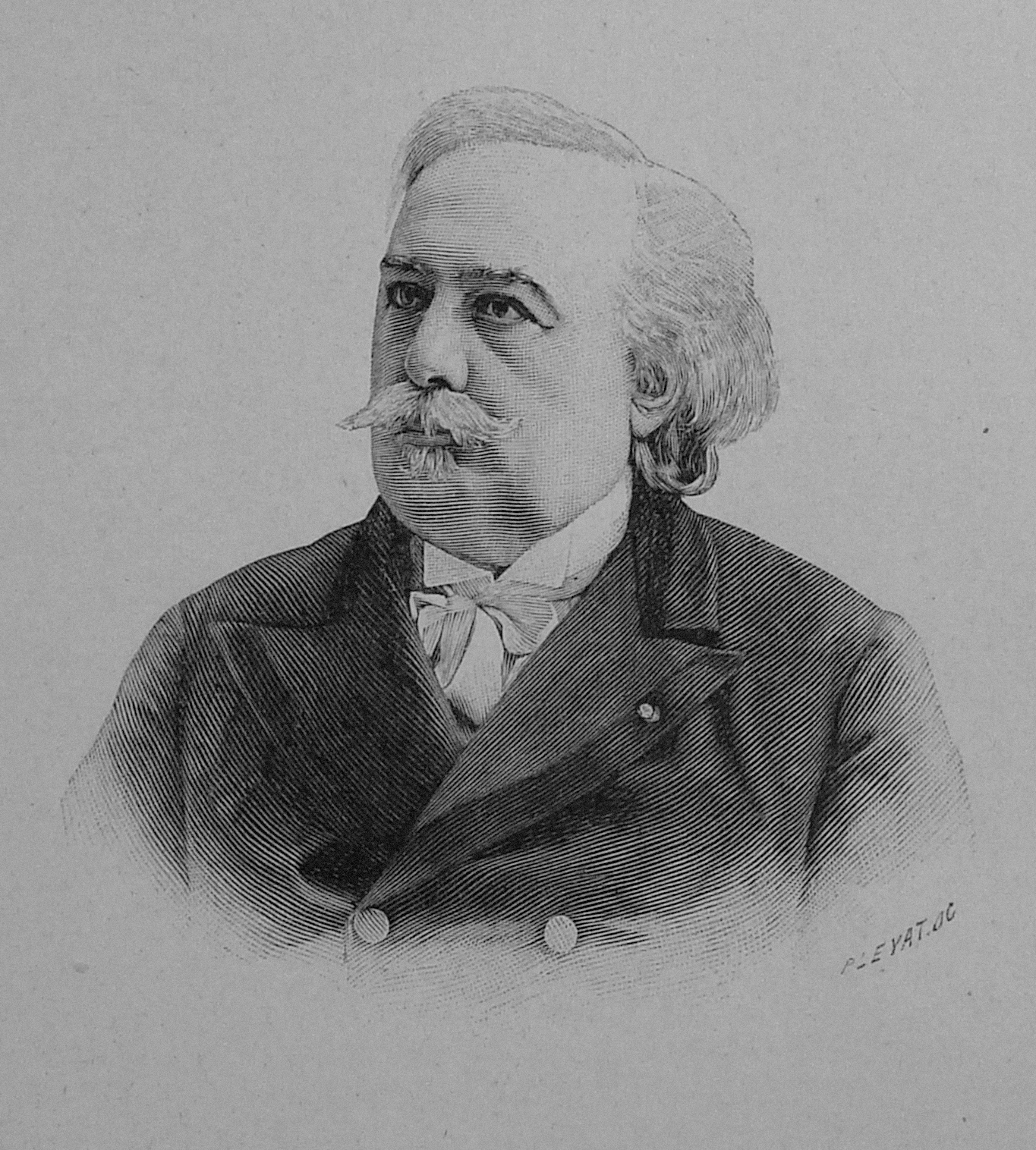
- Engraving by P. Leyat from a photograph in Figures contemporaines (1902)
- Born: 5 July 1837; Mirecourt, Vosges
- Died: 19 August 1908 (aged 71); Rueil, Seine-et-Oise
- Occupations: List: Novelist; Journalist; Soldier
- Writing career
- Pen name: Jean de Villiot
- Period: 1880–1906
- Genre: Erotica
- Literary movement: Decadence

Hector Nicolas Alphonse Marie France (1837–1908) was a French writer and soldier, the author of numerous stories of an erotic nature. Has also translated from English into French and from French into English. He sometimes collaborated with Hugues Rebell (alias Georges Grassal) and Charles Carrington under the collective pseudonym Jean de Villiot.

== Life ==
Hector France was born on 5 July 1837 at Mirecourt. He was present at the rout in Algeria in 1870. He returned to France and became a member and an officer of the Paris Commune but was deported in 1872, taking up a secondary career as a writer. He died on 19 August 1908 in Rueil-Malmaison, aged seventy-one.

== Appraisal ==
France was by profession a soldier, and wrote ably on military and economic subjects, as John Bull's Army (1887) and several pamphlets evince. His fictions show a loving care of form and effect, also a delight in dwelling on painful and revolting aspects of passion. The Pastor's Romance (1879); Love in the Blue Country (1880); and Sister Kuhnegunde's Sins (1880), exemplify both.

In 1881 he published his most famous work, Sous le Burnous, which included some illustrations by Édouard-Henri Avril. The play was translated into English by Alfred Allinson as Musk, Hashish and Blood (1900).

== Works ==
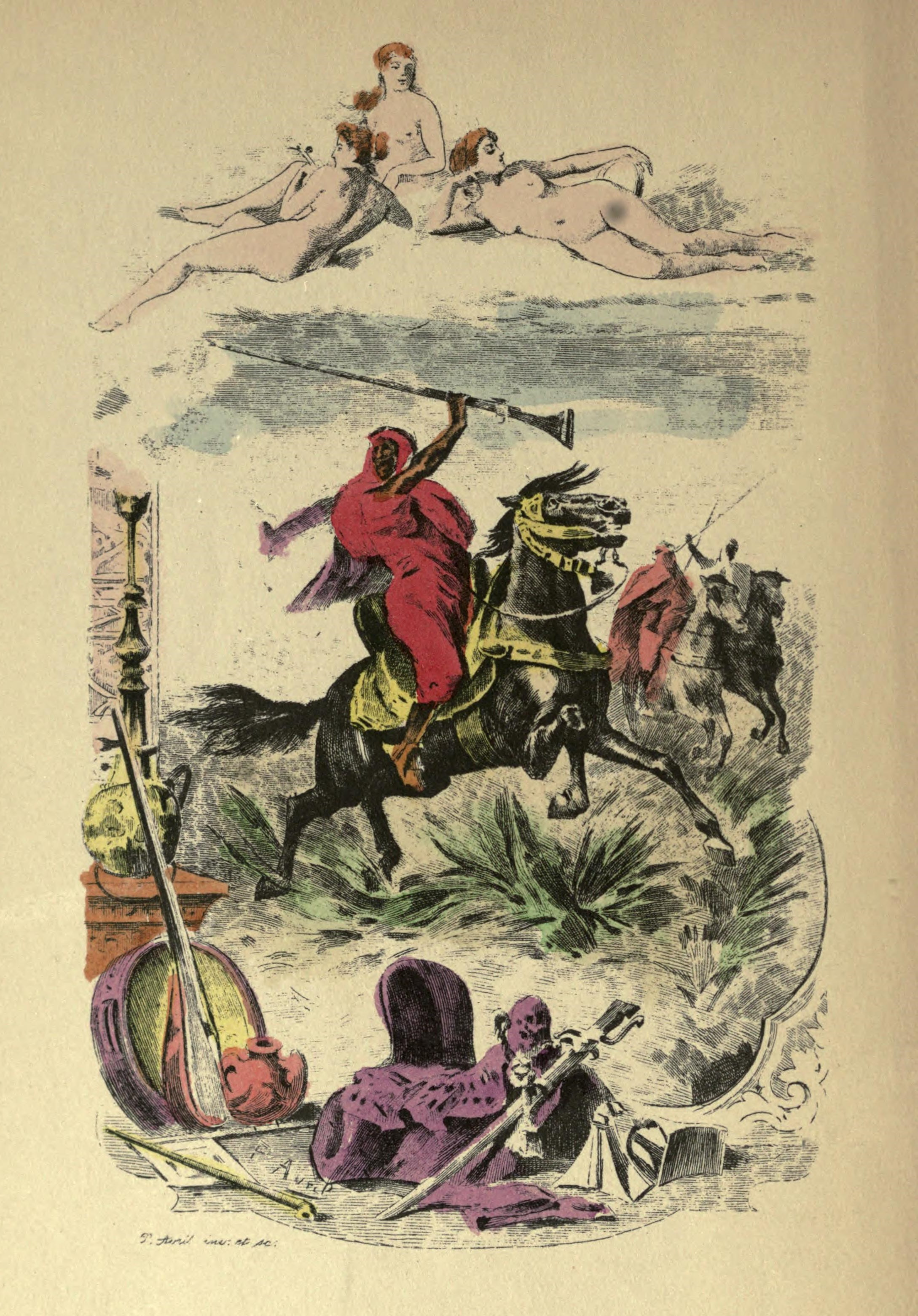
Musk, Hashish and Blood (1900)

- L'Amour au pays bleu (Paris: Alphonse Lemerre, 1880; 291 pages) (BnF 30457826p)
- Le Péché de sœur Cunégonde (Paris: Chauvin, 1880; 483 pages) (BnF 304578469)
- Les Cent Curés paillards (Paris: Librairie du progrès, 1883) (BnF 304578349)
- Marie Queue-de-Vache (Paris: Librairie du progrès, 1883; 481 pages) (BnF 304578407)
- Les Va-nu-pieds de Londres (Paris: G. Charpentier & Co., 1883; 332 pages) (BnF 304578616)
- Le Roman du curé (Paris: Henri Oriol, 1884; 452 pages) (BnF 304578558)
- La Pudique Albion. Les Nuits de Londres (Paris: G. Charpentier & Co., 1885) (BnF 30457850j)
- Sous le burnous (Paris: G. Charpentier & Co., 1886; 333 pages) (BnF 304578589); reissue (Toulouse: Anacharsis, 2011) (ISBN 978-2-914777-75-9)
- L'Armée de John Bull (Paris: G. Charpentier & Co., 1887; 344 pages) (BnF 30457830x)
- Ketty Culbute [followed by] La Révolte des Tramps [and] La Gigue d'Ève (Brussels: Messageries de le Presse, 1887; 12 pages) (BnF 304578391)
- Sac au dos à travers l'Espagne (Paris: G. Charpentier & Co., 1888, 320 pages) (BnF 30457857z)
- La Vierge russe (Paris: H. Geffroy, 1893, 800 pages) (BnF 30457844m)
- Dictionnaire de la langue verte. Archaïsmes, néologismes, locutions étrangères, patois (Paris: Librairie du progrès, 1890; 495 pages (BnF 32124091b)
- Roman d'une jeune fille pauvre (Paris: H. Geffroy, 1896; 1763 pages) (BnF 30457854x)
- Les Mystères du monde… [continuation and end of Mystères du peuple by Eugène Sue] (Paris: Maurice Lachâtre, 1898; 800 pages) (BnF 30457844m)
- L'Outrage (Paris: H. Geffroy, 1900; 968 pages) (BnF 30457845z)
- Croquis d'outre-Manche (Paris: Eugène Fasquelle, 1900; 293 pages) (BnF 30457835n)
- Au pays de Cocagne, principauté de Monaco (Paris: Eugène Fasquelle, 1902; 297 pages) (BnF 304578318)
- Musk, Hashish and Blood (Paris: Charles Carrington, 1902; 447 pages) (BnF 30457859n)
- Le Beau Nègre: roman de mœurs sud-américaines (Paris: C. Carrington, 1902; 414 pages) (BnF 30457832m)
- La Fille du garde-chasse (Paris: H. Geffroy, 1903; 1544 pages) (BnF 30457837b)
- Un Parisien en Sibérie. Part One, Le Tueur de Cosaques (Paris: A.-L. Guyot, 1906; 187 pages) (BnF 30457860v)
