= James Bertram =

James Bertram may refer to:

- James Bertram (New Zealand writer) (1910–1993), New Zealand writer and academic
- James Bertram (musician), American indie-rock musician
- James Bertram (Carnegie secretary) (1872–1934), secretary to steel magnate and philanthropist Andrew Carnegie
- James Glass Bertram (1824–1892), Scottish author
