= Spanking Love =

- Cover to the Japanese VHS release of Spanking Love (1995)
- Directed by: Shōji Tanaka
- Written by: Kenichi Yamakawa
- Produced by: Issei Hashiguchi
- Starring: Toshio Kakei; Kumi Shiraishi; Yoshiko Yura
- Cinematography: Kōichi Saitō
- Edited by: Toshirō Matsutake
- Music by: CO Fusion
- Production company: Japan Home Video
- Distributed by: Daiei
- Release date: May 6, 1995
- Running time: 100 minutes
- Country: Japan
- Language: Japanese

Spanking Love (スパンキング・ラブ) is a 1995 Japanese erotic film directed by Shōji Tanaka and based on a story by Kenichi Yamakawa.

== Synopsis ==
Ryō Masuda (Toshio Kakei) is a director of S&M movies who asks a woman he meets on a crowded street to star in one of his films. The woman, Yumi Sakata, accepts on a whim but her expressive features—in particular, her eyes—make that particular low-budget production into an unexpected hit. Ryō is attracted to her but feels there is something dangerous or evil about her and does not want to have anything more to do with her. However, it is not that simple.

Ryō's girlfriend, Mayumi, is a dominatrix who services a very powerful man. Mayumi's client, Mr. Okonogi, wants Yumi to work in an S&M show club he owns. Mayumi fears she may be "sacrificed" if Mr. Okonogi doesn't get want he wants and she begs Ryō to find Yumi and persuade her to go to the S&M club.

Ryō finally persuades Yumi to go to the club with him and Mayumi by telling her that he loves her and that Mayumi is an ex-girlfriend from a long time ago. Yumi becomes a star dominatrix (even through the film Ryō made showed her being whipped rather than whipping submissives as she does at the club).

Ryō finds himself torn between his feelings for Mayumi and Yumi's expectations. He also stands to make a considerable amount of money as Yumi's "manager" and companion.

Mr. Okonogi, who defines sadism and masochism as "two sides of the same coin," and who enjoys watching as well as participating, refuses to let Mayumi retire. It appears that he has the power of life-and-death over her. One of Mayumi's female friends, Natsumi, commits suicide rather than continue working in the S&M industry. Mayumi goes to the funeral. Ryō does not.

== Cast ==
- Toshio Kakei (筧利夫) as Ryō Masuda
- Yoshiko Yura (由良よしこ) as Yumi Sakata
- Kumi Shiraishi (白石久美) as Mayumi Yamane (dominatrix)
- Yōsuke Nakajima (中島陽典) as Dai
- Renji Ishibashi (石橋蓮司) as Ryūsaku Okunogi

== Background and availability ==
While in Paris as a foreign exchange student in the early 1990s, Issei Sagawa was arrested for the murder and cannibalization of his girlfriend. After his return to Japan, he made an appearance in director Hisayasu Satō's pink film Promiscuous Wife: Disgraceful Torture (1992), which made him into a cult celebrity. Spanking Love became his feature film debut.

Shōji Tanaka filmed Spanking Love for Japan Home Video and it was released in Japan by Daiei on May 6, 1995. Video Maker released it in VHS format in Japan on July 21, 1995, and it was re-released in VHS format on August 4, 2000. In their Japanese Cinema Encyclopedia: The Sex Films (1998), Thomas and Yuko Mihara Weisser gave the film a rating of two out of four stars. Media Blasters released the film in the U.S. in VHS and DVD format on their "Tokyo Shock" label on September 26, 2000.

== See also ==
- Sadism and masochism in fiction
