= The Memoirs of Dolly Morton =

Pornographic novel published in London in 1899

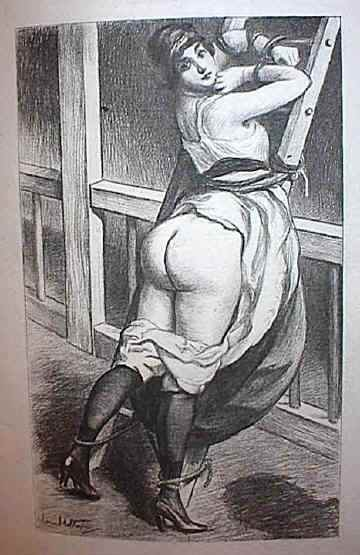
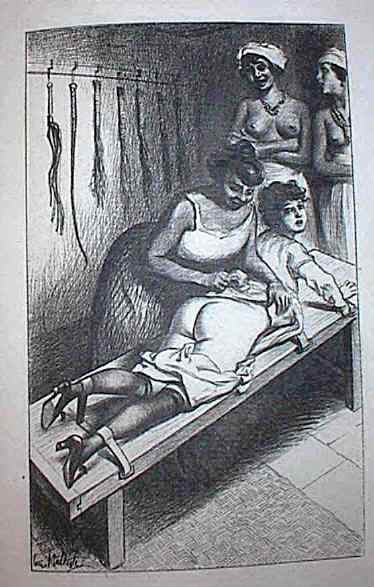
The Memoirs of Dolly Morton illustration

The Memoirs of Dolly Morton: The Story of A Woman's Part in the Struggle to Free the Slaves, An Account of the Whippings, Rapes, and Violences that Preceded the Civil War in America, with Curious Anthropological Observations on the Radical Diversities in the Conformation of the Female Bottom and the Way Different Women Endure Chastisement is a pornographic novel published in London in 1899 under the pseudonym Jean de Villiot, probably Hugues Rebell or Charles Carrington who published the work. Another edition was published in Philadelphia in 1904.

The book relates the misadventures of Quakers Dolly Morton and her companion Miss Dove who venture into the American South to help with an Underground Railroad. They are captured by a lynch mob, flogged and made to ride the rail, and Dolly Morton is forced to be the mistress of a plantation owner. The book is written as the memoirs of Dolly Morton after she has become a madam.

It has been suggested that it may have been an influence on James Joyce's novel Ulysses.

== Bibliography ==
- Lisa Z. Sigel, International Exposure: perspectives on modern European pornography, 1800-2000, Rutgers University Press, 2005, ISBN 0-8135-3519-0, p. 86-89, 98
- Donald Serrell Thomas, A Long Time Burning: the history of literary censorship in England, Routledge & Kegan Paul, 1969, p. 314
