= Martin van Maële =

French illustrator (1863–1926)

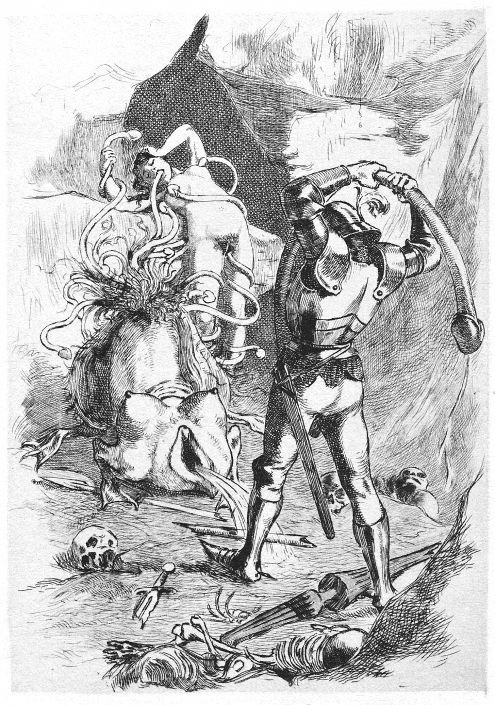
- An illustration by Martin van Maële: La Grande danse macabre des vifs
- Born: Maurice François Alfred Martin van Miële; 12 October 1863; Boulogne-Billancourt, France
- Died: 5 September 1926 (aged 62); Varennes-Jarcy, France
- Occupation: Illustrator

Maurice François Alfred Martin van Maële (12 October 1863 – 5 September 1926), better known by his pseudonym Martin van Maële, was a French illustrator of early 20th century literature, particularly erotic literature. His work has been criticized for graphically depicting sexual violence against women, animals, and children.

In 2010, Larry Sanger reported the Wikimedia Foundation to the FBI for hosting child sexually abusive material, including twelve illustrations by Maëlle. They were subsequently removed.

== Family relationships ==
Van Maële was born in the commune of Boulogne sur Seine, once an important industrial town, near Paris, France, to Flemish mother Virginie Mathilde Jeanne van Maële and French father Louis Alfred Martin (himself an engraver and later a teacher at the Beaux-Arts school in Geneva). His pseudonym, Martin van Maële, is a combination of his mother's maiden name and his father's surname. He also sometimes used the pseudonym A. Van Troizem.

He married Marie Françoise Genet; the couple had no children. He died on 5 September 1926, aged 62, and was interred in the cemetery of Varennes-Jarcy.

== Life and career ==
Van Maële worked at Brussels as well as Paris, and his best known work – an illustrated edition of Paul Verlaine's poems – was published in small, secretive editions by publisher Charles Carrington. The prints are considered humorous and satirical, and sometimes cynical.

Van Maële's career is said to have begun in earnest with his illustrations for H. G. Wells in Les Premiers Hommes dans la Lune (or The First Men in the Moon), published by Félix Juven in 1901.

The title inspired the classic 1902 sci-fi silent film called Le Voyage Dans La Lune, produced by Georges Méliès. Van Maële also illustrated Anatole France's Thais, published by Charles Carrington, also in 1901. The following year, and occasionally thereafter, van Maële worked as an illustrator for the Félix Juven's French translations of the Sherlock Holmes series. He is mostly remembered for his erotic illustrations.

== Bibliography ==
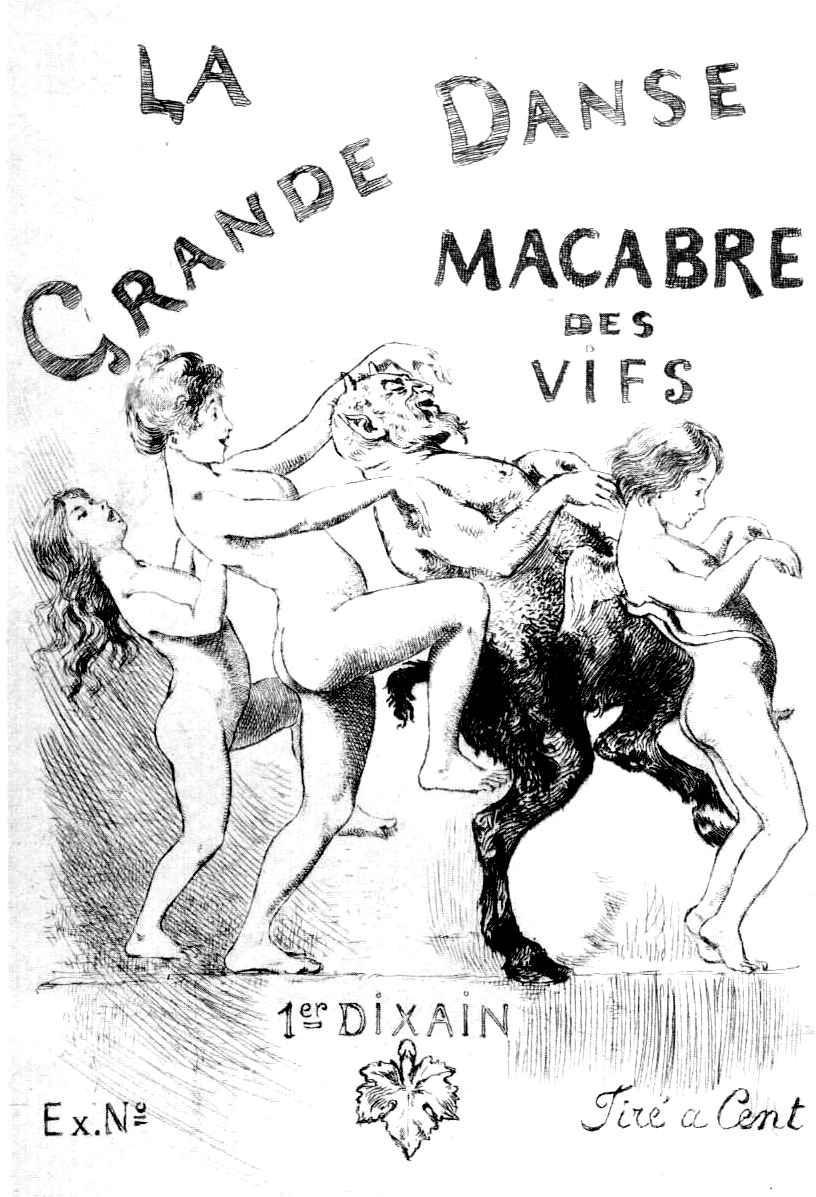
La Grande Danse macabre des vifs (1905)

=== Collection ===
- The Satyrical Drawings of Martin van Maële.

=== Drawings ===
- Anatole France, Thaïs, Charles Carrington, Paris, 1901.
- Wilhelm Reinhard (translated by Jean de Villiot), La flagellation des femmes en Allemagne, Charles Carrington, Paris, 1901. 20 drawings.
- Margaret Anson (translated by Jean de Villiot), Une société de flagellantes. Réminiscences et révélations d’une soubrette de grande maison..., Charles Carrington, Paris, 1902.
- Anatole France (translated by A. R. Allinson), The Well of Santa Clara (Le puits de Sainte Claire), Charles Carrington, Paris, 1903.
- Jean de Villiot, Dix-sept ans : étude sociale, Charles Carrington, Paris, 1905. Drawings.
- Apulée (translated by Jean de Montlyard), L'Âne d'or, Charles Carrington, Paris, 1905. 21 eaux-fortes. New edition by Jean de Bonnot, Paris, 1991.
- Paul Verlaine, La Trilogie érotique : Amies, Femmes, Hombres, Charles Carrington, Bruxelles, 1907. 15 drawings.
- Aimé Van Rod, Nos Belles flagellantes, Paris, 1907. 10 drawings.
- Pierre Choderlos de Laclos, Les Liaisons dangereuses, Jules Chevrel, Paris, 1908. 20 drawings.
- Jules Michelet, La Sorcière, Jules Chevrel, Paris, 1911. New edition by Jean de Bonnot, 1987.
- Edgar Allan Poe (translated by Charles Baudelaire, Dix contes, Librairie Dorbon-Ainé, Paris, 1912. 95 engravings by Eugène Dété.
- Denis Diderot, La Religieuse, Jules Chevrel, Paris 1916.
- Sadinet, Petites cousines : souvenirs érotiques d'un homme de qualité touchant les jolies petites cousines... les bonnes à tout faire... les femmes du monde et les belles filles de province, À la folie du jour (Jean Fort), 1919. Drawings attributed to Van Maële.
- Claude de Saint-Hieble, L'Instrument des apothécaires, Jean Fort, coll. « Les Amis du bon vieux temps », Paris, 1920.
- Edmond Haraucourt, La Légende des sexes, Au Clos Bruneau, Paris, 1921. 12 gravings.
- François Béroalde de Verville, Le Moyen de parvenir, Jean Fort, Paris, 1921. 18 coloured drawings and 65 small drawings.
- Pierre Fély, Les Princesses de Cythère, chronique libertine de l'histoire., Jean Fort, coll. « Les Amis du bon vieux temps », Paris, 1922.
- Charles Sorel, L'Histoire comique de Francion. En laquelle sont découvertes les plus subtiles finesses et trompeuses inventions tant des hommes que des femmes de toutes sortes de conditions et d’âges., Jean Fort, Paris, 1925. 17 drawings and 16 compositions.
- Pierre de Jusange, La Comtesse au fouet, Jean Fort, Paris, 1926. 7 drawings.
- Docteur Gastien Fowler, Maison des flagellations, Jean Fort, Collection des Orties Blanches, Paris, 1926.
- Pierre l'Arétin, Dialogues, Jean Fort, 1927. 66 drawings and 10 drawings. Van Maële died while the drawings were being made, so some are by Luc Lafnet.
- Ovid, Les amours; L'art d'aimer; Les Héroïdes; Les remèdes d'amour; Les cosmétiques, Jean de Bonnot, Paris, 2000.
- Conan Doyle, Aventures Extraordinaires, 15 drawings, Librairie Félix Juven, Paris, 1902.

=== Others ===
- Martin van Maële, La Grande Danse macabre des vifs, Charles Carrington, 1905. 40 drawings. New edition by Déesse, Nanterre, 1980.
- Martin van Maële, The satyrical drawings of Martin van Maële, Cythera Press, New York, 1970.
- Luc Binet, Martin Van Maele ou le diable se cache dans les détails. Catalogue raisonné, Humus, Lausanne, 2017.

== See also ==
- Louis Legrand
