= The Wolf Leader =

1857 novel by Alexandre Dumas

- The Wolf Leader by Alexandre Dumas, Prime Press, 1950
- Author: Alexandre Dumas
- Original title: Le Meneur de loups
- Translator: Alfred Allinson
- Language: French
- Genre: Dark fantasy; Gothic
- Publisher: Cadot
- Publication date: 1857
- Publication place: Paris
- English publication date: 1904
- Media type: Print

The Wolf Leader (French: Le Meneur de loups) is an 1857 dark fantasy novel by Alexandre Dumas. An English translation by Alfred Allinson was first published in London by Methuen in 1904 under the title The Wolf-Leader; the first American edition, edited and somewhat cut by L. Sprague de Camp and illustrated by Mahlon Blaine, was issued under the present title by Prime Press in 1950. The text was also serialized in eight parts in the pulp magazine Weird Tales in the issues for August 1931 to March 1932.

== Plot summary ==
Le Meneur de Loups is set around 1780 in Dumas' native town of Villers-Cotterêts, and is supposedly based on a local folk-tale Dumas heard as a child. The story concerns Thibault, a shoe-maker, who is beaten by the gamekeeper of the Lord of Vez for interfering with the lord's hunting. Afterwards he encounters a huge wolf, walking on its hind legs like a man, who offers him vengeance; Thibault may wish harm on any person in return for one of his own hairs for each wish. To seal the agreement, the two exchange rings. As a result of this bargain he also finds himself able to command the local wolves, and hence gradually gains the reputation of being a werewolf.

Thibault's first two wishes kill the gamekeeper and injure the Lord of Vez. The wishes turn two hairs on his head long and red, as do his subsequent ones, which, though equally successful, also backfire against him in unexpected ways, leaving him scorned and hated by others in his community. Finally one of his wishes causes him to trade bodies with Lord Raoul of Vauparfond, who is having an affair with the wife of the Count de Mont-Gobert. Caught with the lady by the count as the result of an earlier wish against Lord Raoul, he is mortally wounded. He manages to keep himself alive until transferred back into his own body, only to find himself trapped in his own home, to which the townsfolk have set fire.

Escaping, Thibault takes to the forest, where he subsists on animals caught for him by his wolves and hunts and is hunted by the Lord of Vez. He has but one human hair left on his head. The conclusion of the book, however, brings him an unusual redemption.

== Critical reception ==
In 1951, Anthony Boucher and J. Francis McComas reviewed the 1950 Prime Press edition and placed it among "Dumas's drabbest hack-work." Discussing the werewolf theme in literature, Franz Rottensteiner described The Wolf-Leader as "considerably superior from a literary point of view".
