= Prix Nocturne =

The Prix Nocturne is a French literary prize founded in 1962 by Roland Stragliati and revived in 2006 by the review "Le nouvel Attila". It is awarded each November to recognise fantastic or unusual works.

== Winners ==
- 1962 - Leo Perutz, Le Marquis de Bolibar (Albin Michel, 1930)
- 1963 - Bruno Schulz, Le Traité des mannequins (Éditions Julliard, 1961)
- 1966 - Hugues Rebell, Les Nuits chaudes du Cap français (La Plume, 1902)
- 2006 - Giovanni Papini, Gog (Flammarion, 1932)
- 2007 - Ramon Sender, Noces Rouges (Seghers, 1947)
- 2008 - Miodrag Bulatovic, Le coq rouge (Seuil, 1963)
- 2009 - André Laurie, Spiridon le muet (Rouff, 1908)
- 2010 - Ermanno Cavazzoni, Cirenaica (Einaudi, 1999)
- 2011 - Ludvik Vaculik, Les Cobayes (Gallimard, 1974)
- 2013 - André de Richaud, La Nuit aveuglante (Robert Morel, 1966)
