= Ellangowan =

Ellangowan may refer to:

- Ellangowan (horse) (1920–after 1935), a racehorse
- Ellangowan, Queensland, a locality in the Toowoomba Region, Australia
- Ellangowan House, a Category B listed house in Dumfries, Scotland
- Ellangowan, a pseudonym of Scottish author James Glass Bertram (1824–1892)
- Ellangowan, a fictitious location in Scotland in Walter Scott's novel Guy Mannering

== See also ==
- Ellengowan, Ontario, a community in Arran–Elderslie, Canada
