= Pierce Egan the Younger =

English journalist and novelist

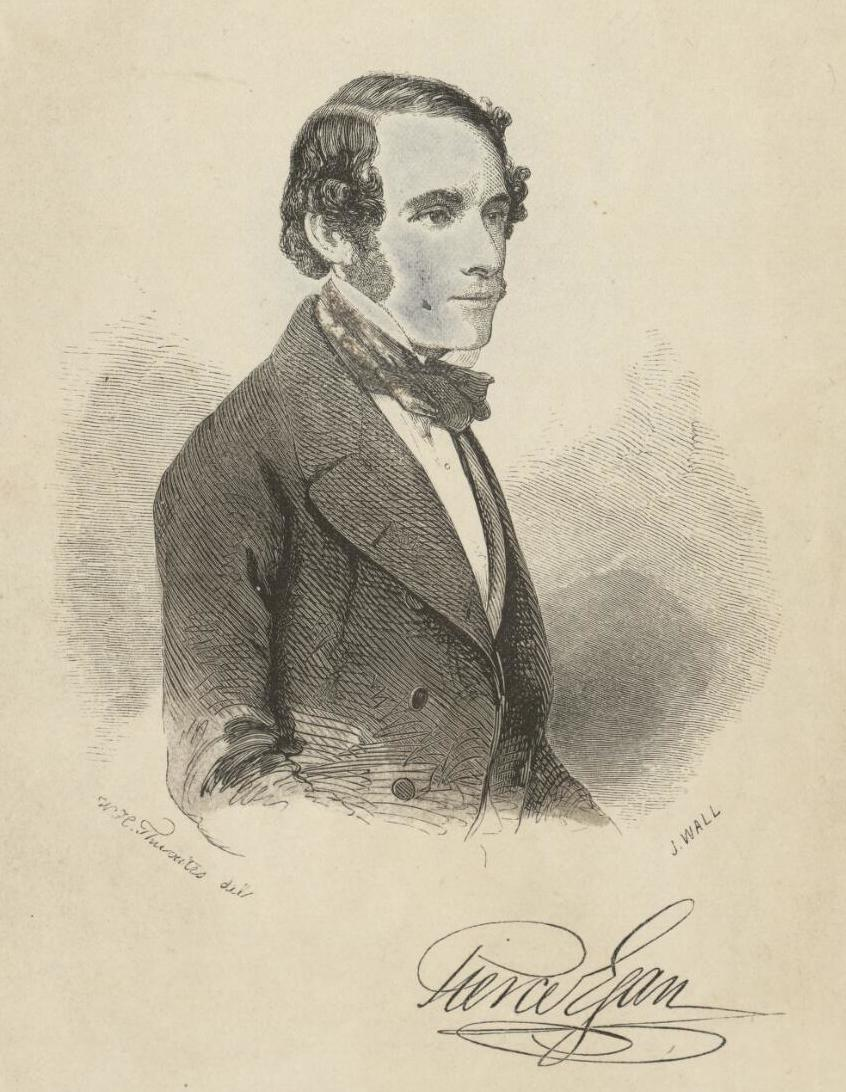
Portrait of Pierce Egan by J. Wall

Pierce Egan the Younger (1814 – 6 July 1880) was an English journalist and novelist. The son of Pierce Egan, the author of Life in London, associated with his father in several of his works.

== Early life ==
He was born in London, and his mother died when he was eleven years old.

Early on he showed a taste for drawing. He was educated to follow art professionally, frequented theatres, and made sketches during the performances. He etched these designs, which were published as frontispieces to the plays in George Bolwell Davidge's Acting Drama. His most ambitious work as an artist was a series of etchings to illustrate his father's serial, The Pilgrims of the Thames in Search of the National (1837).

== Journalist and serial writer ==
He contributed to the early volumes of the Illustrated London News, started in likem, and from 7 July 1849 to the end of 1851 edited the Home Circle. In Nos. 53–119, vols, iii–v. of this work, ending 11 October 1851, reappeared, extended and recast, his Quintyn Matsys, the Blacksmith of Antwerp, afterwards reissued separately in library form with illustrations. An early edition had been published about 1839.

He wrote in January 1857 for Reynolds's Miscellany, Nos. 444–8, a popular Christmas story called The Waits; later republished in John Thomas Dicks' series of English Novels, No. 106. Also in Reynolds's Miscellany was The False Step; or the Castle and the Cottage (begun 21 February 1867, ended 3 October, Nos. 450-82). He then transferred to The London Journal as a major contributor until the end of his life. Sir John Gilbert illustrated many of the works. On 5 December 1857, in vol. xxvi. No. 667, appeared the first chapters of Egan's Flower of the Flock. It ended in No. 689, and was next week followed by The Snake in the Grass (8 May 1858, ending 27 November 1858, in No. 720).

Beginning in 1858, and again through 1869, new proprietors of the Journal dispensed with Egan's services and reprinted three novels by Sir Walter Scott. But the circulation diminished, so Egan was again summoned to restore its popularity. This he attempted, somewhat hurriedly, with a slight story called The Love Test (15 January 1869, in vol. xxix., completed in No. 746 on 28 March). After a short interval he began a new story, with his best power, 'Love me. Leave me Not' (22 October 1859; ending 30 June 1860, Nos. 767-803).

Further stories followed in his later life: My Love Kate; or the Dreadful Secret; The Poor Girl, followed by a companion novel entitled The Poor Boy, and Snake in the Grass.

== Other novels ==
Other novels were part publishing of weekly numbers, and later in volumes. Several of them contained woodcuts and etchings by the author. Among these were:

- Wat Tyler in 3 books, 1841, re-published in 1851, full of slaughter, with love scenes; the novel originally began life as a story about Oliver Cromwell until Egan learned that another writer was authoring a book about Cromwell, so he changed the setting and characters to tie in with a novel about the leader of the Peasants' Revolt.
- Robin Hood and Little John; or, the Merrie Men of Sherwood Forest, serialized beginning in 1838, published in book form 1840;
- Captain Macheath based upon John Gay's The Beggar's Opera (1727), began its serialisation in 1841.
- Adam Bell, Clym o' the Cleugh, and William of Cloudeslie, a long story of woodland adventures, 1842;
- Paul Jones, the privateer, 2 vols., with Egan's etched frontispiece and designs on wood, 1842.

Other early works were:

- The London Apprentice
- Edward the Black Prince; or, Feudal Days (c.1850)
- Clifton Grey; or, Love and War (1854–55)

Egan's Robin Hood text was later translated and resumed into two French language parts by Alexandre Dumas (The Prince of Thieves, 1872, and Robin Hood the Outlaw, 1873; re-translated back into English in 1904 by Alfred Richard Allinson). The first book of the Dumas interpretation was translated into Spanish by Colombia's Editorial Oveja Negra, but it was billed as being written by Sir Walter Scott, the author of Ivanhoe.

== Personal life ==
He married Charlotte Martha Jones in 1844 and had three children: Pierce (b.1844), John (b.c.1848) and Violet Catherine (b.1850). Although the first edition of the Oxford Dictionary of National Biography stated that 'he was a liberal in politics', recent research into Egan's novels has shown him to have been a radical writer, arguing against Old Corruption and advocating republicanism in the United Kingdom.

He died on 6 July 1880 at his residence, Ravensbourne, Burnt Ash, Lee, Kent (now London) and was buried on the eastern side of Highgate Cemetery. His burial plot (no.23931) no longer has a headstone or any identifying mark.
