= Alfred Richard Allinson =

British academic, author, and voluminous translator

- Born: 5 September 1852; Newcastle upon Tyne, England
- Died: December 1929; Hackney, London, England
- Occupations: author, translator
- Writing career
- Period: 1890–1927

Alfred Richard Allinson (1852–1929) was a British academic, author, and voluminous translator of continental European literature (mostly French, but occasionally Latin, German and Russian) into English. His translations were often published as by A.R. Allinson, Alfred R. Allinson, or Alfred Allinson. He was described as "an elusive literary figure about whom next to nothing is known; the title-pages of his published works are really all we have to go on."

== Life ==
Allinson was born in September 1852 in Newcastle upon Tyne. He attended Lincoln College, Oxford, beginning in 1872, from which he took a Bachelor of Arts degree on 14 June 1877, and a Master of Arts degree in 1882. After graduation he worked as an assistant school master and a librarian. He was also a meteorological hobbyist. He was living in Newcastle, Northumberland in 1901, and in St Thomas, Exeter in Devon in 1911. He died in December 1929 in the London Borough of Hackney.

== Career ==
His early works as a translator included a number of works of French erotica for Paris-based speciality publisher Charles Carrington in the late 1880s and 1890s. Later he branched out into mainstream French literature, including works of various serious and popular authors. He participated with other translators in two ambitious early twentieth century projects to render the works of Anatole France and Alexandre Dumas into English. He also translated a number of children's books and historical works, and, late in his career, a number of volumes of the sensationalist Fantômas detective novels.

Allinson's sole work of note as an original author was The Days of the Directoire (1910), a historical and social portrait of France during the period of the French Revolution. His aim in this work was "to present a vivid account of the extraordinary years from 1795 to 1799, when the Five Directors ruled France from the Palace of the Luxembourg; to portray the chief actors of those stirring times; and to draw a picture of the social conditions prevailing in capital and country after the tremendous changes of the Revolution."

== Significance ==
Allinson's primary importance to literature is in helping to introduce French authors Alexandre Dumas and Anatole France to a broad English audience. Several of his translations of their works were the first into English, and a number of these remain the only English versions. In the case of Anatole France, his were the English versions authorised by the original writer.

== Selected bibliography ==
=== Original works ===
- The Days of the Directoire (1910) (Internet Archive e-text)

=== Edited works ===
- Waverley, or 'Tis Sixty Years Since, by Sir Walter Scott (1892)

=== Translated works ===
Note: publication dates shown are those of the translation, not of publication in the original language.

==== Works of Alexandre Dumas ====
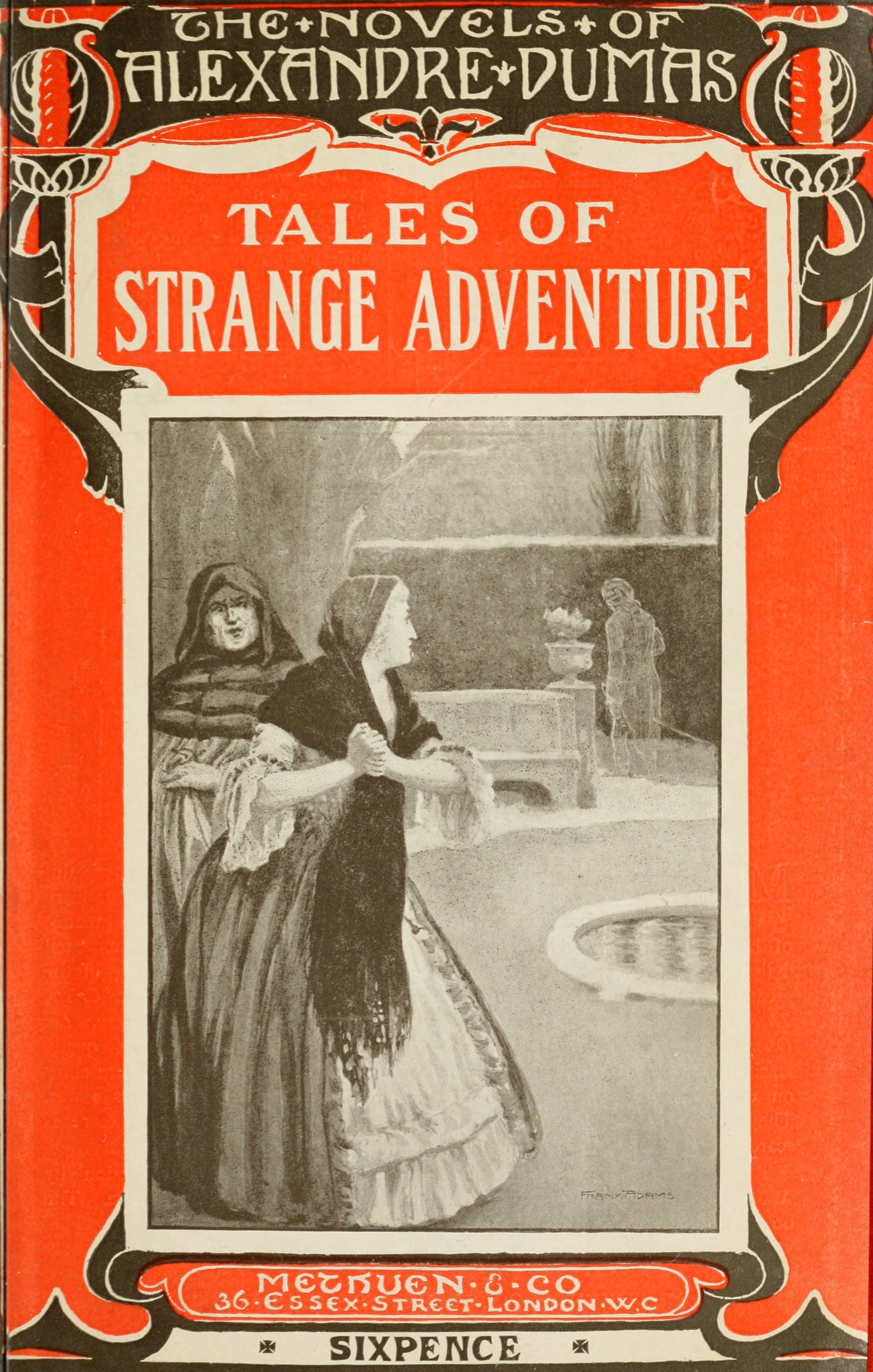
Tales of Strange Adventure (jacket)

- Acté, a Tale of the Days of Nero (1905) – first English translation
- The Adventures of Captain Pamphile and Delaporte's Little Presents (Le capitaine Pamphile) (1905)
- Amaury (1904)
- Bontekoe (1904)
- Captain Marion (1906) – 1st English translation
- Captain Pamphile (1904)
- The Castle of Eppstein (Le château d'Eppstein) (1904) – first English translation
- Catherine Blum, and Other Stories (1922?)
- Cécile; or, The Wedding Gown (Cécile) (1904)
- The Chevalier d'Harmental
- Chicot the Jester (La dame de Monsoreau) (1921)
- Conscience (Conscience l'innocent) (1902) – first English translation
- The Convict's Son and Other Stories (Fils du forçat, M. Coumbes) (1922)
- The Corsican Brothers (Frères corses) (1904)
- Crop-Eared Jacquot and Other Stories (1903) – first English translation
- The Dove (1906) – 1st English translation
- The Duke of Savoy's Page (Page du duc de Savoie)
  - Pt. 3. The Tourney of the Rue Saint-Antoine
- The Fencing Master; Life in Russia (Maître d'armes) (1921)
- Fernande (1904) – 1st English translation
- Georges, or, The Isle of France (Georges) (1904)
- King Pepin (1906) – 1st English translation
- Maître Adam (Maître Adam le Calabrais) (1906) – 1st English translation
- Mille et un fantômes
  - Tales of Strange adventure (1906) – 1st English translation
  - Tales of Terror (1906) – 1st English translation
  - Tales of the Supernatural (1906) – 1st English translation
- The Mouth of Hell (Le Trou de l'Envers) – 1st English translation
- My Pets (Mes Bêtes) (1909) – 1st English translation
- Nanon; or, Women's War (1904)
- Olympia (Olympia de Clèves) – 1st English translation
- Otho, the Archer (Orthion l'archer) (1904)
- Pascal Bruno (1904)
- Pauline (1904)
- Père la Ruine (Le père la Ruine) (1905) – 1st English translation
- The Prince of Thieves (1904) (back translation, as the text was a French translation of Pierce Egan the Younger's 1838 work)
- Queen Margot (La Reine Margot)
  - Pt. 1: The Great Massacre (1921)
  - Pt. 2: Henri de Navarre (1921)
- The Reminiscences of Antony; and Marianna (1905)
- The Regent's Daughter (Fille du régent)
  - Pt. 1. Hélène de Chaverny (1907)
  - Pt. 2. The Tragedy of Nantes (1908)
- Robin Hood, the Outlaw (1904) (back translation, as the text was a French translation of Pierce Egan the Younger's 1838 work)
- Samuel Gelb – 1st English translation
- The Snowball (1903)
- Sultanetta (1903)
- The Three Musketeers (Les Trois Mousquetaires) (1903)
- Twenty Years After (Vingt Ans Après) (1904)
- The Two Dianas (Les deux Diane)
  - Pt. 1. The Taking of Calais (1909)
  - Pt. 2. The Chatalet (1921)
- The Vicomte of Bragelonne: Ten Years Later (Le Vicomte de Bragelonne, ou Dix ans plus tard) (1904)
  - Pt. 1. Louise de la Vallière
  - Pt. 2. The Man in the Iron Mask
- The Wild-Duck Shooter – 1st English translation
- The Wolf-Leader (Le Meneur de loups) (1904)

==== Works of Anatole France ====
- The Aspirations of Jean Servien (Les désirs de Jean Servien) (1912)
- The Crime of Sylvestre Bonnard (Le Crime de Sylvestre Bonnard)
- The Garden of Epicurus (Le jardin d'Epicure) (1908)
- The Gods Are Athirst (Les dieux ont soif) (1913)
- The Human Tragedy (L'Humaine Tragedie) (1917) (previously pub. as part of The Well of Saint Clare)
- Little Sea Dogs, and Other Tales of Childhood (co-translated with J. Lewis May) (1925)
- Marguerite and Count Morin, Deputy; together with Alfred de Vigny and The Path of Glory (1927) (co-translated with J. Lewis May)
- The Merrie Tales of Jacques Tournebroche, and Child Life in Town and Country (Les contes de Jacques Tournebroche and Les enfants) (1909)
- The Path of Glory (1916)
- The Well of Saint Clare (Le puits de Sainte Claire) (1903)

==== Works of Pierre Souvestre and Marcel Allain ====
- Bulldog and Rats (Fantômas Attaque Fandor), by Marcel Allain (1928)
- Fantômas Captured (Fantômas en Danger), by Marcel Allain (1926)
- Juve in the Dock (Fantômas, Roi des Recéleurs), by Marcel Allain (1925)
- A Limb of Satan (La Main Coupée), by Pierre Souvestre and Marcel Allain (1924)
- The Long Arm of Fantômas (Le Policier Apache), by Pierre Souvestre and Marcel Allain (1924)
- The Lord of Terror (Fantômas est-il réssuscité?), by Marcel Allain (1925)
- The Revenge of Fantômas (Fantômas prend sa Revanche), by Marcel Allain (1927)

==== Works of other authors ====
- Birds and Beasts, by Camille Lemonnier (1911)
- The Chastisement of Mansour (L'amour au pays bleu), by Hector France (1898)
- The Diverting Adventures of Maurin (Maurin des Mauris), by Jean Aicard (1910)
- Down There (Là-Bas), by Joris-Karl Huysmans (1930)
- Forty-five years of my life (1770 to 1815), by the Princess Louise of Prussia (Princess Antoni Radziwiłł) (1912)
- Golf, by Arnaud Massy (1914)
- Green Girls, by Alphonse Momas
- Intimate Memoirs of Napoleon III : Personal Reminiscences of the Man and the Emperor, by Baron d'Ambès (pseud.) (1912)
- Justine: The Misfortunes of Virtue, by Marquis de Sade (1912)
- The Lascivious Monk (Lyndamine, ou, L'optimisme des pays chauds), attributed to Jean-Charles Gervaise de Latouche (1908) – 1st English translation
- Lives of Fair and Gallant Ladies (Vies de dames galantes), by Pierre de Bourdeille, seigneur de Brantôme (1901–1902) – 1st English translation
- The Massacre of the Innocents (Massacre des innocents), by Maurice Maeterlinck (1914)
- Maurice Maeterlinck, a Biographical Study, by Gérard Harry, with two essays by Maeterlinck (1910)
- Maurin the Illustrious, by Jean Aicard (1910)
- Nell in Bridewell (Lenchen im Zuchthaus), by Wilhelm Reinhard (1900)
- Passion and Criminality in France : a Legal and Literary Study (Le crime et le suicide passionnels), by Louis Proal (1901) Internet Archive e-text
- Satanism and Witchcraft, a Study in Medieval Superstition (Le sorci'ere), by Jules Michelet (1939) (a.k.a. Witchcraft, Sorcery, and Superstition (1992))
- The Satyricon, by Petronius (1930) [this translation was originally erroneously attributed to Oscar Wilde]
- The Sexual Instinct and its Morbid Manifestations from the Double Standpoint of Jurisprudence and Psychiatry, by Veniamin Mikhailovich Tarnovskii (1890)
- The Shadow of Love, by Marcelle Tinayre (1911)
- The Sorceress; a Study in Middle Age Superstition, by Jules Michelet (1904)
- The Sword and Womankind, Being a Study of the Influence of "The Queen of Weapons" Upon the Moral and Social Status of Women (L'Épée et les femmes), by Edouard de Beaumont (1900)
- Tortures and Torments of the Christian Martyrs, From the "De ss. martyrum cruciatibus", by Antonio Gallonio (1903)
- An Unknown Son of Napoleon, by Hector Fleischmann (1914)
- Walks in Paris, by Georges Cain (1909)
- The War Diary of the Emperor Frederick III, 1870–1871 (Das Kriegstagebuch von 1870/71), by Frederick III, German Emperor (1926)
