= Lady Libertine =

- DVD cover
- Directed by: Gérard Kikoïne
- Written by: Harry Alan Towers
- Produced by: Wilfrid Dodd; Harry Alan Towers
- Starring: Christopher Pearson; Jennifer Inch; Sophie Favier; Alain Dumaurier
- Cinematography: Gérard Loubeau
- Music by: Marc Hillman
- Distributed by: Playboy Enterprises
- Release date: 1984
- Running time: 84 minutes
- Country: United Kingdom
- Language: English

Lady Libertine (also known as Frank and I) is a 1984 soft-core erotic film by Gérard Kikoïne. This Playboy production, released theatrically in Europe and on television in the US, is an adaptation of the Victorian novel (1902) Frank and I by Bill Adler. French actress turned famous TV host Sophie Favier unsuccessfully sued to stop its release.

Gérard Kikoïne had quite a large budget for this film and was assisted by French set designer Jean-Charles Dedieu. Therefore production values are quite good, especially since they involve many period costumes and sets. Jennifer Inch is playing the role of Frank, the orphan boy, and of Frances. Sophie Favier plays the role of the mistress of Charles de Beaumont.

== Plot ==
In the 1880s, a rich nobleman from London, Charles de Beaumont (Christopher Pearson), meets "Frank", an adolescent, and offers hospitality to the young orphan. According to the usages of his caste, Charles decides to educate Frank by himself. But Frank is not an obedient pupil and Charles is surprised when he eventually discovers that Frank is not a boy as he believed, but a beautiful young girl named Frances with a dark secret.
