= Sadopaideia =

Pornographic novel published in 1907

Sadopaideia: Being the Experiences of Cecil Prendergast Undergraduate of the University of Oxford Shewing How he was Led Through the Pleasant Paths of Masochism to the Supreme joys of Sadism is a pornographic novel published in 1907 by "Ashantee of Edinburgh": probably Charles Carrington in Paris. It was later published in the United States by Grove Press (GP-421). In two volumes, it is the story of a man who experiences both dominance and submission. It was written anonymously but Anthony Storr attributes it to Algernon Charles Swinburne.
