= John Davidson (poet) =

Scottish poet, playwright and novelist (1857–1909)

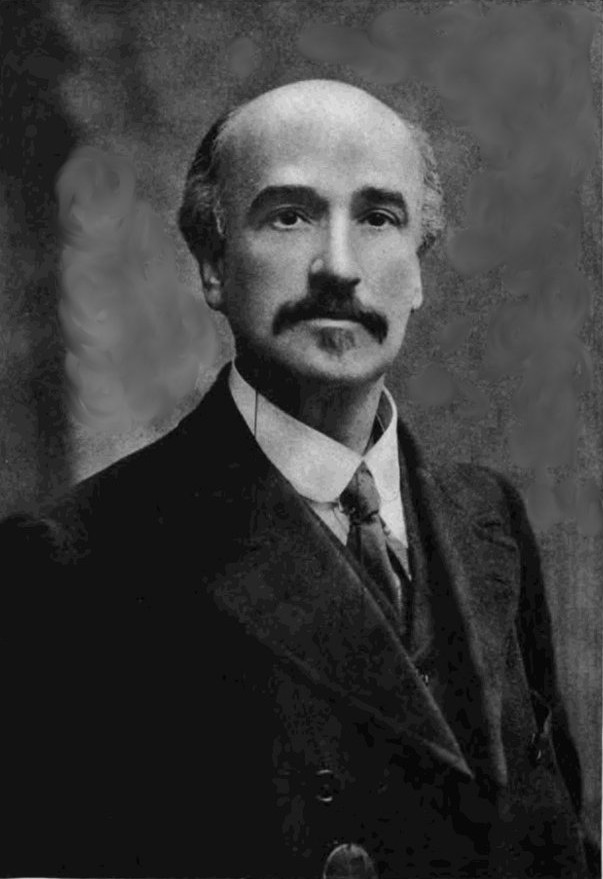
- John Davidson
- Born: 11 April 1857; Barrhead, East Renfrewshire, Scotland
- Died: 23 March 1909 (aged 51); Penzance, Cornwall, England
- Resting place: Buried at sea off Penzance
- Citizenship: British
- Education: University of Edinburgh (1876–77)
- Occupations: Poet, playwright, novelist
- Spouse: Margaret McArthur of Perth
- Children: Alexander and Menzies
- Writing career
- Language: English

John Davidson (11 April 1857 – 23 March 1909) was a Scottish poet, playwright and novelist, best known for his ballads. He also did translations from French. In 1909, financial difficulties, as well as physical and mental health problems, led to his suicide.

== Life and works ==
=== Scotland ===
He was born at Barrhead, East Renfrewshire as the son of Alexander Davidson, an Evangelical Union minister and Helen née Crocket of Elgin. His strict Protestant upbringing deeply influenced the type of man and writer he would become. Harold Herbert Williams writes: "Like Carlyle he was a protagonist of the actual, for in boyhood he had been trained in the strictest sect of the Calvinists, and like Carlyle he spent half his life buffeting the universe as a Calvinist without dogma."

His family removed to Greenock in 1862 where he was educated at Highlanders' Academy there and entered the chemical laboratory of Walker's Sugarhouse refinery in his 13th year, returning after one year to school as a pupil teacher. Davidson also briefly worked in the Public Analysts' Office, from 1870 to 1871. In these employments he developed an interest in science which became an important characteristic of his poetry. In 1872 he returned for four years to the Highlanders' Academy as a pupil-teacher, and, after a year at University of Edinburgh (1876–77), received in 1877 his first scholastic employment at Alexander's Charity, Glasgow. During the next six years he held positions in the following schools: Perth Academy (1878–81), Kelvinside Academy, Glasgow (1881–82), and Hutchinson's Charity, Paisley (1883–84). He varied his career by spending a year as clerk in a Glasgow thread firm (1884–85), and subsequently taught in Morrison's Academy, Crieff (1885–88), and in a private school at Greenock (1888–89).

=== London ===
Having taken to literature, he went in 1889 to London where he frequented 'Ye Olde Cheshire Cheese' and joined the 'Rhymers' Club'. Davidson's first published work was Bruce, a chronicle play in the Elizabethan manner, which appeared with a Glasgow imprint in 1886. Four other plays, Smith, a Tragic Farce (1888), An Unhistorical Pastoral (1889), Aromantic Farce (1889), and the brilliant pantomimic Scaramouch in Naxos (1889) were also published while he was in Scotland.

Besides writing for the Speaker, the Glasgow Herald, and other papers, he produced several novels and tales, of which the best was Perfervid (1890). But these prose works were written for a livelihood.

=== Verse ===
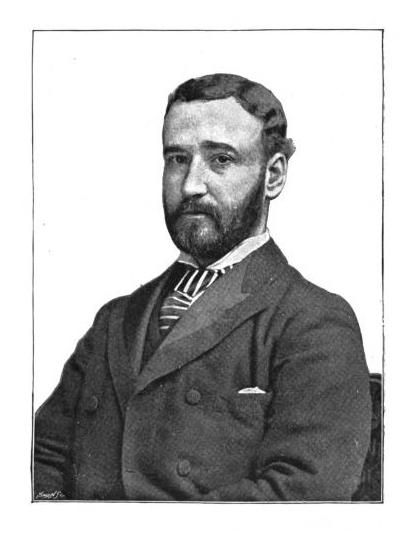
John Davidson

Davidson's true medium was verse. In a Music Hall and other Poems (1891) suggested what Fleet Street Eclogues (1893) proved, that Davidson possessed a genuine and distinctive poetic gift. The late nineteenth century English novelist George Gissing read both these volumes in one day in 1893 at the British Museum Library. Yeats had words of praise for In a Music Hall. He called it, "An example of a new writer seeking out 'new subject matter, new emotions'". Yeats wrote of his emotional dispute with Davidson in Autobiographies (1955). The second collection established his reputation among the discerning few. His early plays were republished in one volume in 1894, and henceforward he turned his attention more and more completely to verse. A volume of vigorous Ballads and Songs (1894), his most popular work, which Davidson sent a copy of to George Gissing, who wrote that it "gave me thoughts", was followed in turn by a second series of Fleet Street Eclogues (1896) and by New Ballads (1897) and The Last Ballad (1899).

=== Dramatic works ===
For a time he abandoned lyric for the drama, writing several original plays.

=== 'Testaments' ===
Finally Davidson engaged on a series of "Testaments", in which he gave definite expression to his philosophy. These volumes were entitled The Testament of a Vivisector (1901),The Testament of a Man Forbid (1901), The Testament of an Empire Builder (1902), and The Testament of John Davidson (1908). Though he disclaimed the title of philosopher, he expounded an original philosophy which was at once materialistic and aristocratic. The cosmic process, as interpreted by evolution, was for him a fruitful source of inspiration.

His later verse, which is often fine rhetoric rather than poetry, expressed the belief which is summed up in the last words that he wrote, "Men are the universe become conscious; the simplest man should consider himself too great to be called after any name." The corollary was that every man was to be himself to the utmost of his power, and the strongest was to rule. Davidson professed to reject all existing philosophies, including that of Nietzsche, as inadequate, but Nietzsche's influence is traceable in his argument. The poet planned ultimately to embody his revolutionary creed in a trilogy entitled God and Mammon. Only two plays, however, were written, The Triumph of Mammon (1907) and Mammon and his Message (1908).

=== Family ===
In 1885 Davidson married Margaret, daughter of John McArthur of Perth. She survived him with two sons, Alexander (born 1887) and Menzies (born 1889).

=== Other works ===
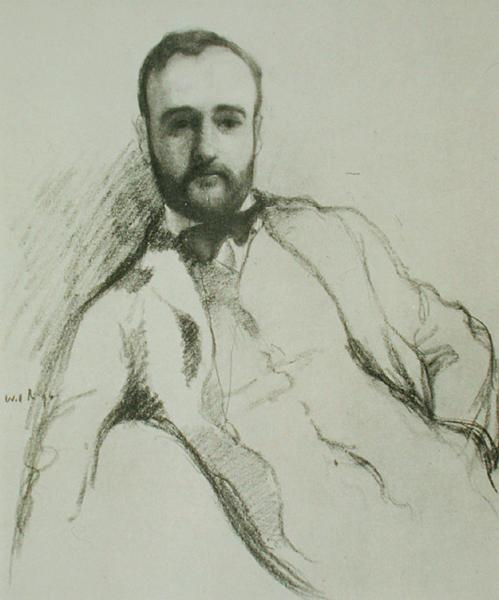
Portrait of John Davidson by William Rothenstein in The Yellow Book, Vol. 4 (1895)

Davidson was a prolific writer. Besides the works cited, he wrote many other works, including The Wonderful Mission of Earl Lavender (1895), a novel which included flagellation erotica, and he contributed an introduction to Shakespeare's Sonnets (Renaissance edition, 1908), which, like his various prefaces and essays, shows him a subtle literary critic.

=== Translations ===
He translated Montesquieu's Lettres Persanes (1892), François Coppée's Pour la Couronne in 1896 and Victor Hugo's Ruy Blas in 1904, the former being produced as, For the Crown, at the Lyceum Theatre in 1896, the latter as A Queen's Romance at the Imperial Theatre.

=== Portraits ===
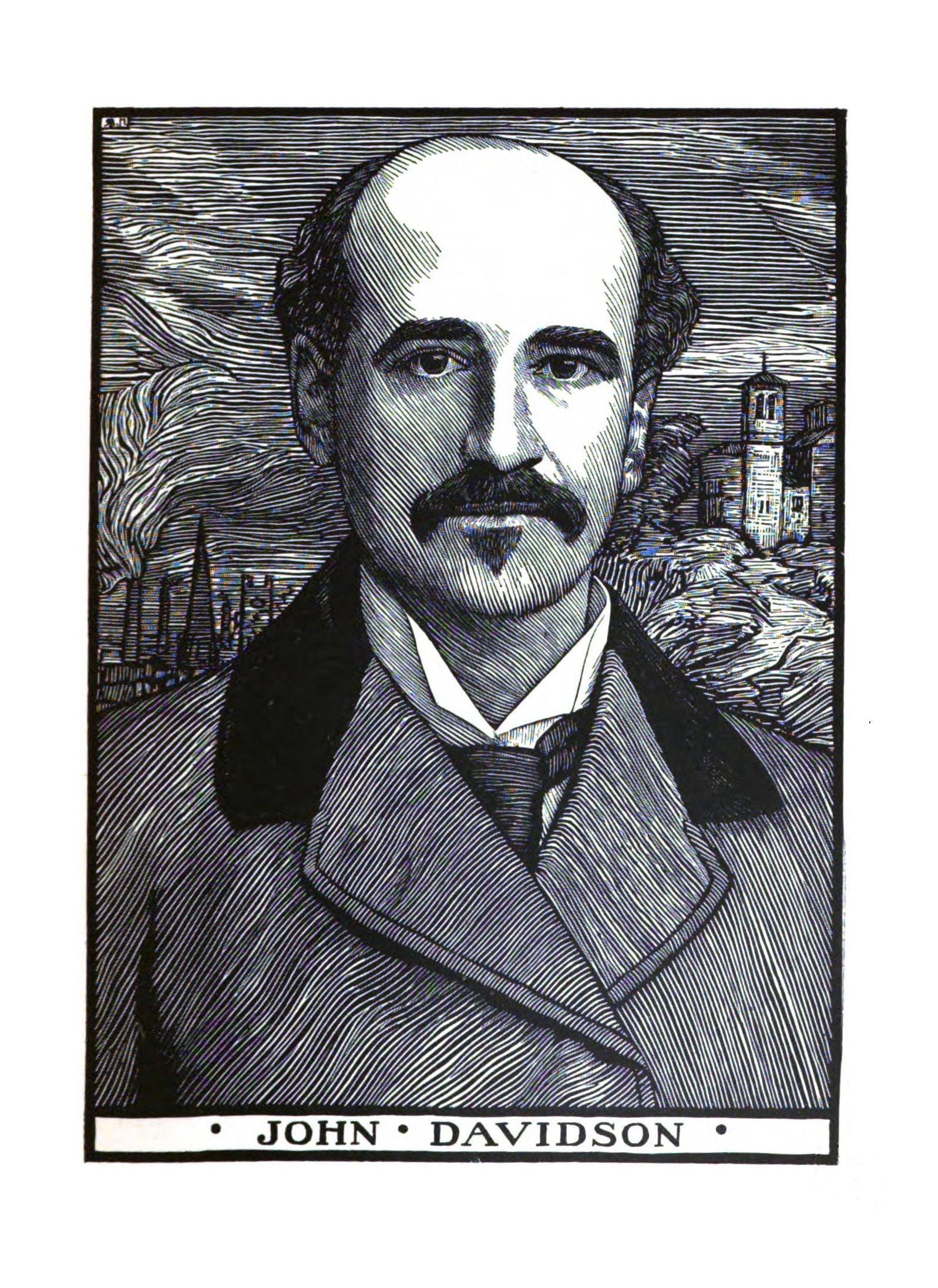
Woodcut of John Davidson by Robert Bryden 1902

Davidson's portrait was drawn by Walter Sickert and by Robert Bryden. A caricature by Max Beerbohm appeared in The Chapbook, (1907), and William Rothenstein did a portrait of him for The Yellow Book. In Men and Memories (1931), Rothenstein said that when Max Beerbohm looked at his pictures of Davidson, he had complimented him on the 'subtle way he had handled his toupée'. Rothenstein wrote that he had not noticed that he was wearing one.

Frank Harris, a member of the Rhymers' Club, described him in 1889:

"... a little below middle height, but strongly built with square shoulders and remarkably fine face and head; the features were almost classically regular, the eyes dark brown and large, the forehead high, the hair and moustache black. His manners were perfectly frank and natural; he met everyone in the same unaffected kindly human way; I never saw a trace in him of snobbishness or incivility. Possibly a great man, I said to myself, certainly a man of genius, for simplicity of manner alone is in England almost a proof of extraordinary endowment."

=== Drowning ===
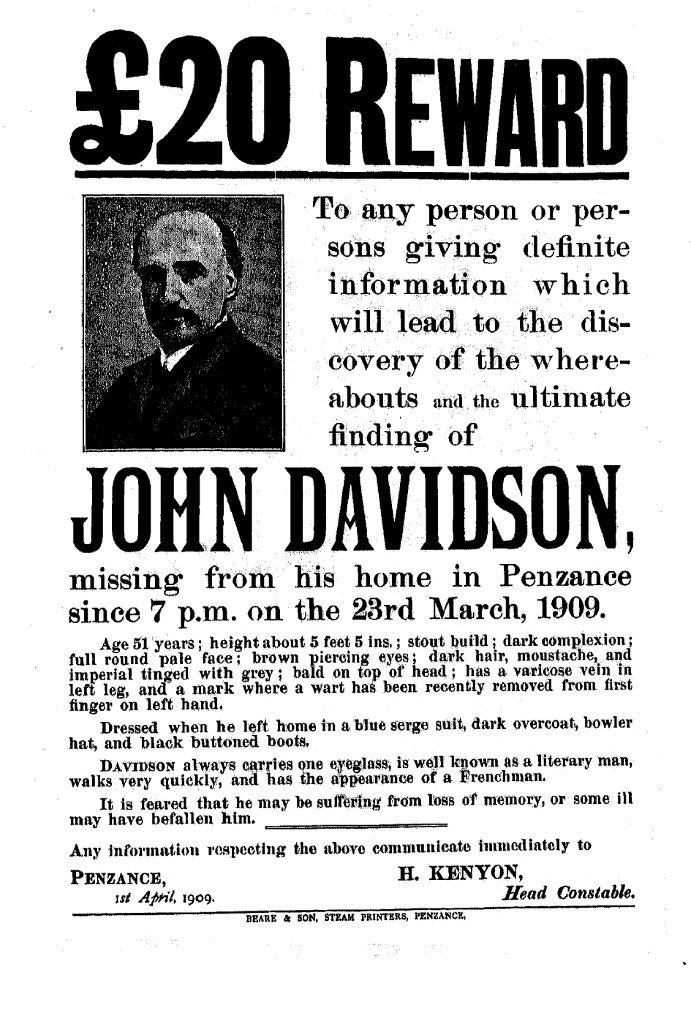
'Missing' poster 1909

In 1906 he was awarded a civil list pension of £100 per annum and George Bernard Shaw did what he could to help him financially, but poverty, ill-health, and his declining powers, exacerbated by the onset of cancer, caused profound hopelessness and clinical depression. Late in 1908, Davidson left London to reside at Penzance. On 23 March 1909, he disappeared from his house there, under circumstances which left little doubt that he had drowned himself. Among his papers was found the manuscript of a new work, Fleet Street Poems, with a letter containing the words, "This will be my last book." His body, which was discovered by some fishermen in Mount's Bay on 18 September, was, in accordance with his known wishes, buried at sea. In his will he desired that no biography should be written, none of his unpublished works published, and "no word except of my writing is ever to appear in any book of mine as long as the copyright endures."

The assumption that he took his own life is consistent with what is known of his temperament and his ideas. In The Testament of John Davidson, published the year before his death, he anticipates this fate:

"None should outlive his power. . . . Who kills
Himself subdues the conqueror of kings;
Exempt from death is he who takes his life;
My time has come."

=== Legacy ===
Davidson's poetry was a key early influence on important Modernist poets, in particular, his compatriot Hugh MacDiarmid and Wallace Stevens. T.S. Eliot was especially fond of the poem 'Thirty Bob a Week' (In Ballads and Songs (1894)). Davidson's poem "In the Isle of Dogs", for example, is a clear intertext of later poems such as Eliot's "The Waste Land" and Stevens' "The Idea of Order at Key West".

=== Quotes ===
- "This is an age of Bovril"

== Works ==
Read essay on John Davidson (PDF)

- The North Wall (1885)
- Diabolus Amans (1885), verse drama
- Bruce (1886 ) a drama in five acts
- Smith (1888) a tragedy
- Plays (1889)
  - An Unhistorical Pastoral, a Romantic Farce
  - Scaramouch in Naxos
- Perfervid: The Career of Ninian Jamieson, (1890) with 23 Original Illustrations by Harry Furniss, Ward & Downey, Ltd., London.
- The Great Men, And a Practical Novelist (1891) Illustrated by E. J. Ellis. Ward & Downey, Ltd., London.
- In a Music Hall, and other Poems (1891) Ward & Downey, Ltd., London.
- Laura Ruthven's Widowhood (with C. J. Wills), (1892)
- Fleet Street Eclogues (1893)]
- The Knight of the Maypole, (1903)
- Sentences and Paragraphs (1893)
- Ballads and Songs (1894) John Lane Publishers, London
- Baptist Lake (1894) Ward & Downey, Ltd., London.
- A Random Itinerary (1894)
- A Full and True Account of the Wonderful Mission of Earl Lavender (1895)
- St. George's Day (1895)
- Fleet Street Eclogues (Second Series) (1896)
- Miss Armstrong's and Other Circumstances (1896)
- The Pilgrimage of Strongsoul and Other Stories (1896)
- New Ballads (1897)
- Godfrida, a play (1898)
- The Last Ballad (1899)
- Self's the Man, a tragi-comedy, (1901)
- The Testament of a Man Forbid (1901)
- The Testament of a Vivisector (1901)
- The Testament of an Empire Builder (1902)
- A Rosary, (1903) Grant Richards, London
- The Knight of the Maypole: A Comedy in Four Acts (1903)
- The Testament of a Prime Minister (1904)
- The Ballad of a Nun (1905)
- The Theatrocrat: a Tragic Play of Church and State, (1905)
- Holiday and other poems, with a note on poetry (1906)
- The Triumph of Mammon (1907) E.G. Richards, London
- Mammon and His Message (1908)
- The Testament of John Davidson (1908)
- Fleet Street and other Poems, (1909)
- Contributor to The Yellow Book

He translated:

- Montesquieu's Lettres Persanes, (Persian Letters) (1892)
- François Coppée's Pour la couronne, (For the Crown) (1896)
- Victor Hugo's Ruy Blas, (A Queen's Romance) (1904)
