= Kenichi Yamakawa =

Japanese author and rock musician (born 1953)

Kenichi Yamakawa (山川 健一, Yamakawa Ken'ichi, born 19 July 1953) is a Japanese author and rock musician.

== Books (written in Japanese) ==
- Kagami no Naka no Glass no Fune (A Glass Ship in the Mirror)
- Suishoh no Yoru (Christal Nacht)
- Rolling Kids
- Rockn'roll Games
- Macintosh High

== Albums ==
- Backstreet
