= Charles Carrington =

British publisher of erotica (1867–1921)

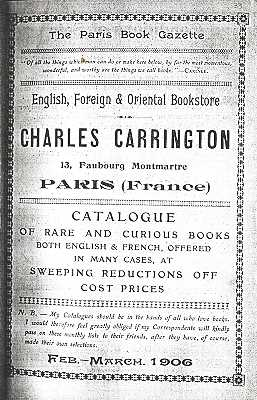
Coverpage of a catalogue of books published by Charles Carrington (Paris, 1906)

Charles Carrington (1867–1921) was a leading British publisher of erotica in late-19th- and early-20th-century Europe. Born Paul Harry Ferdinando in Bethnal Green, England on 11 November 1867, he moved in 1895 from London to Paris where he published and sold books in the rue Faubourg Montmartre and rue de Chateaudun; for a short period he moved his activities to Brussels. Carrington also published works of classical literature, including the first English translation of Aristophanes' "Comedies," and books by famous authors such as Oscar Wilde and Anatole France, in order to hide his "undercover" erotica publications under a veil of legitimacy. His books featured the erotic art of Martin van Maële. He published a French series La Flagellation a Travers le Monde mainly on English flagellation, identifying it as an English predilection.

Carrington went blind as a result of syphilis and the last few years of his life were spent in poverty as his mistress stole his valuable collection of rare books. He was placed in a lunatic asylum and died in 1921 at Ivry-sur-Seine, France.

== Selected publications ==
- Experimental Lecture (1878) by the pseudonym "Colonel Spanker" for the "Cosmopolitan Society of Bibliophiles", one of his imprints. The Colonel and his circle have a house in Park Lane where genteel young ladies are kidnapped, humiliated, and flagellated.
- Raped on the Railway: a True Story of a Lady who was first ravished and then flagellated on the Scotch Express (1894) by Anonymous for the "Cosmopolitan Bibliophile Society".
- The Loves of a Musical Student - being the History of the Adventures and Amorous Intrigues of a Young Rake (1897) by Anonymous.
- Memoirs of Private Flagellation (1899) by Anonymous (Paris, Librairie des Bibliophiles Français et Étrangers).
- The Old Man Young Again or Age-Rejuvenescence in the Power of Concupiscence (1898) translated to English from the original Arabic. The Arabic text was written by Ibn Kemal.
- The Memoirs of Dolly Morton (1899) by Anonymous (generally attributed to Jean de Villiot, aka Hugues Rebell). Edited and published in London and Paris by Charles Carrington.
- Nell in Bridewell (1900) by Wilhelm Reinhard (Paris, Society of British Bibliophiles [Carrington]), translated to English from the original German Lenchen im Zuchthause (Lenchen in jail) (1840). Also published in French as La Flagellation des femmes en Allemagne (1901).
- The Magnetism of the Rod or the Revelations of Miss Darcy (1902). A reprint of The Romance of Chastisement (1866) by St. George H. Stock.
- Le Fouet à Londres (The Whip in London) (1902), Published in Paris by Charles Carrington as part of the series La Flagellation a Travers le Monde.
- The Satyricon of Petronius, a new translation (1902) the translating originally ascribed by Carrington to Oscar Wilde (who had died two years earlier), later (1930) attributed to Alfred Richard Allinson.
- Femmes Chatiees (1903) by Jean de Villiot. French translation of Charles Carrington's Whipped Women short stories; original manuscript published in 1994.
- Woman and Her Master (1904) by Jean de Villiot, pseudonym of Georges Grassal. Flagellation erotica translated into English by Charles Carrington from the original 1902 French edition, La Femme et son maître.
- La Flagellation amoureuse (1904) by Jean de Villiot, pseudonym of Georges Grassal.
- Le Fouet au Harem (1906) by Jean de Villiot, pseudonym of Georges Grassal.
- The Beautiful Flagellants of New York (1907) by Lord Drialys (The Society of British Bibliophiles [Charles Carrington]: Paris).
- Clic! Clac! Précédé d'un conte "Home-Discipline" (1907) by Jean de Villiot (Librairie des Bibliophiles Parisiens [Charles Carrington]).
- Sadopaideia: Being the Experiences of Cecil Prendergast Undergraduate of the University of Oxford Shewing How he was Led Through the Pleasant Paths of Masochism to the Supreme joys of Sadism (1907), anonymous, possibly by Algernon Charles Swinburne.

== Sources ==
- Sarah Bull. "A Purveyor of Garbage? Charles Carrington and the Marketing of Sexual Science in Late-Victorian Britain." Victorian Review 38.1 (Spring 2012): 55–76.
- Colligan, Colette. A Publisher's Paradise: Expatriate Literary Culture in Paris, 1890–1960. University of Massachusetts Press, 2014.
- Mendes, Peter. "Clandestine Erotic Fiction in England 1800-1930". England: Scolar Press, 1993.
- Straight, Sheryl. "The Erotica Bibliophile" A Bibliography of Works Published
- Paul Douglas, "Charles Carrington and the Commerce of the Risque", The International Journal of the Book, Volume 4, Issue 2, pp. 63–76.
- Thierry Rodange, "Le diable entre au confessional: biographie de Hugues Rebell", Alteredit, 2002, ISBN 2-84633-042-5, pp. 236,301,319
- Rachel Potter, "Obscene Modernism and the Trade in Salacious Books", Modernism/modernity, Volume 16, Number 1, January 2009, pp. 87–104 doi:10.1353/mod.0.0065
- Emma Goldman, Candace Falk, Barry Pateman, Jessica M. Moran, "Emma Goldman: Making speech free, 1902-1909" (Volume 2 of Emma Goldman: A Documentary History of the American Years, Jessica M. Moran) Emma Goldman Series, University of California Press, 2004, ISBN 0-520-22569-4, pp. 513–514
- Green, Jonathon; Karolides, Nicholas J. (2005). The encyclopedia of censorship. Facts on File library of world history. Infobase Publishing. p. 93. ISBN 0-8160-4464-3.
- Forbidden Books: Notes and Gossip on Tabooed Literature / by an old Bibliophile (1902, OCLC 3057005) reprinted 2017 by Facsimile Publisher, Delhi India (distributed by Gyan Books, New Delhi India)
