= The Romance of Chastisement =

Victorian pornographic collection on the theme of flagellation

The Romance of Chastisement is a Victorian pornographic collection on the theme of flagellation by St George Stock (a probable pseudonym, also credited with The Whippingham Papers) and published by John Camden Hotten in 1866. It was reprinted by William Lazenby in 1883 and again by Charles Carrington in 1902 as The Magnetism of the Rod or the Revelations of Miss Darcy.
