= Raped on the Railway =

Raped on the Railway: a True Story of a Lady who was first ravished and then flagellated on the Scotch Express is an anonymous English pornographic story published in 1894 by Charles Carrington under the imprint "Society of Bibliophiles" or "Cosmopolitan Bibliophile Society". The victim, a married woman, is raped by a stranger in a locked railway compartment and, in a trope common in later Victorian pornography, is depicted as ultimately taking pleasure in the act: she is then flagellated by her brother-in-law for the latter transgression.

According to Ronald Pearsall, the story reflects the novel sexual opportunities afforded by railway travel in Victorian England, focused on the erotic opportunities of a male passenger in a railway carriage, who, unusually for the period, finds himself alone with an unchaperoned woman, and the sexual perils of the lady in question who cannot escape from his attentions or summon help from a closed carriage (corridors between carriages being a later innovation). The passage of the train through dark tunnels adds another frisson to the possibility of erotic adventure on the rails.

The plot may also have been inspired by the real-life case of Colonel Valentine Baker, who was convicted of an indecent assault on a young woman in a railway carriage in 1875.

An American adaptation, or plagiarism, was published in New York City under the title Raped on the Elevated Railway, a True Story of a Lady who was First Ravished and then Flagellated on the Uptown Express, illustrating the Perils of Travel in the New Machine Age set in New York.
