= The Whippingham Papers =

Victorian work of sado-masochistic pornography

The Whippingham Papers is a Victorian work of sado-masochistic pornography by St George Stock (a probable pseudonym, also credited with The Romance of Chastisement) and published by Edward Avery in December 1887. It consists of a collection of pieces on flagellation, some of which were contributed anonymously by Algernon Charles Swinburne, including his 94-stanza poem "Reginald's Flogging".
