= A Full and True Account of the Wonderful Mission of Earl Lavender =

Comical play by Scottish author John Davidson

A Full and True Account of the Wonderful Mission of Earl Lavender, which Lasted One Night and One Day; with a History of the Pursuit of Earl Lavender and Lord Brumm by Mrs. Scamler and Maud Emblem
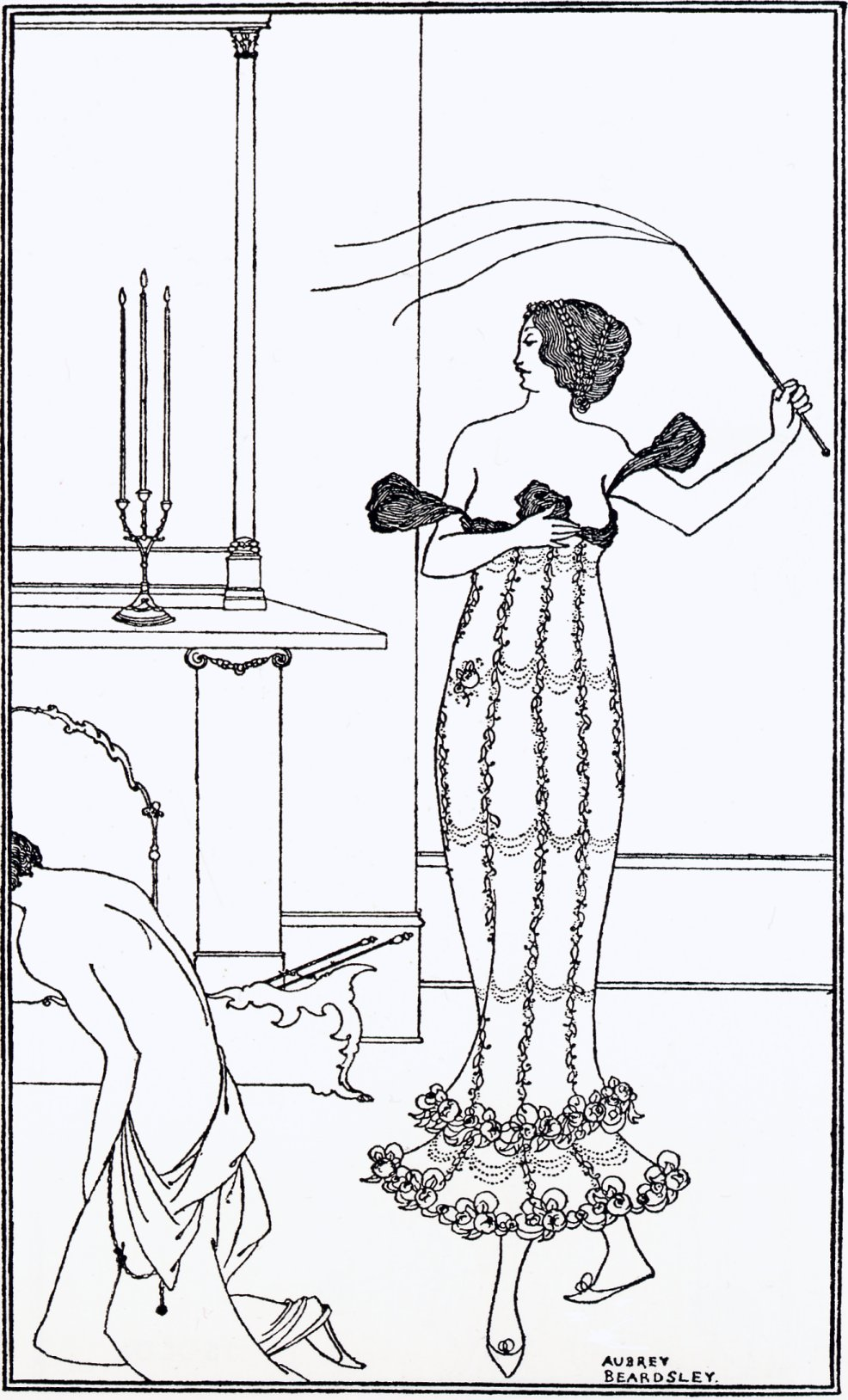
- Frontispiece from Earl Lavender by Aubrey Beardsley
- Author: John Davidson
- Language: English
- Genre: Comedy novel
- Publisher: Ward & Downey
- Publication date: 1895
- Publication place: United Kingdom
- Media type: Print (hardback)
- OCLC: 504516860

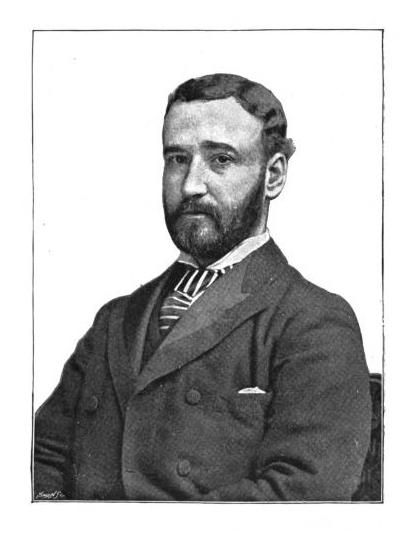
John Davidson in 1895

A Full and True Account of the Wonderful Mission of Earl Lavender, which Lasted One Night and One Day; with a History of the Pursuit of Earl Lavender and Lord Brumm by Mrs. Scamler and Maud Emblem, is a comical novel, written by Scots poet and playwright John Davidson, published in 1895. The story is set in contemporary London (late 19th century) and tells the story of two male friends who are testing Earl Lavender's own version of 'The Theory of Evolution'. It includes two scenes of flagellation. The book is better known for its frontispiece by Aubrey Beardsley, which does not depict any described scene in the book, than it is for its actual text.

== Plot ==
The story begins with two gentlemen dining in a restaurant in the Strand, carefully keeping track of their finances as they order each item. It's revealed that the two men met recently, as they were staying in the same hotel; they both have been fleeing from something (later revealed to be their respective brides) and using aliases in London—in fact they chose the identical alias of J. Smith at the hotel, which facilitated their meeting. They finish their dinner early, not having enough cash to continue ordering at the restaurant they had chosen; on their way to a cheaper establishment, the younger of the two men declares his new religion of Evolution, and asks the other fellow to become his disciple. The man agrees. The young man gives himself the new name of The Earl de l'Avenir, which is immediately corrupted into Earl Lavender; he then christens the older man as Lord New Broom, which is shortened down to Lord Brumm. Earl Lavender explains that his mission is to find the fittest of all women and to mate with her.

The rest of the book finds Earl Lavender leading the way through London, assuring Lord Brumm that Evolution will care for them. They eat at multiple restaurants despite having no money, and luck always causes someone else to be at hand who is willing to pay for them. One mysterious Veiled Lady who pays their bill leads them, afterwards, to an underground city where they are all flogged with knotted cords as part of a strange religious ritual, and then given beds for the night. Earl Lavender perceives that the Veiled Lady may be the fittest of women that he's been looking for, but he is kicked out of the underground city for declaring his passion for her (as these floggings are intended to be completely non-sexual) and Lord Brumm is soon ejected likewise; they are warned that they may return to the underground city in the future but that if there is any more misbehaving, they will be stripped and sent forth into the London streets during broad daylight.

Meanwhile, Maud Emblem and Mrs. Scamler—the wife and the fiancée of Lavender and Brumm respectively—have both discovered each other hunting for their gentlemen and have teamed up after realizing the men are together. Mrs. Emblem describes how her husband ran away on their wedding night, while Mrs. Scamler tells the comical tale of how she went to great lengths to win the love of Brumm only to have him run away the morning they were to be wed.

Eventually the ladies find Lavender and Brumm in a barn surrounded by an angry mob led by a murderous waiter, a Scotsman in full regalia, and the corpse of an orangutan which Lavender had declared to be The Missing Link. The men direct the women back to the underground city, where all of the characters are flogged. Earl Lavender manages to break another rule, but the Veiled Lady and the overseer of this underworld make arrangements to spare him the usual punishment, and instead give him a stern talking-to. Lavender is convinced to abandon his religion of Evolution and his goal of finding the fittest woman in the world. The book ends with the two couples presumably returning home.
