= Alan Mac Clyde (1930s novelist) =

Author of French-language erotic novels, active in the 1930s

Alan Mac Clyde, Edith Kindler, Joan Spanking and Jean de La Beuque fils are pseudonyms for the author of several French-language pornographic novels published in the 1930s by the Librairie Générale (84, Boulevard Diderot, Paris) and Librairie Artistique et Édition Parisienne Rèunies, imprints of Paul Brenet, a publisher specializing in flagellation and BDSM works.

Robert Mérodack has suggested that behind this pseudonym is hidden Maurice Renard (1875–1939) French author of several science fiction novels among which Le Docteur Lerne, sous-dieu, Le Péril bleu and Les Mains d'Orlac. His argument is based on a passage of La Reine cravache where Edith Kindler wrote «taxées de fantaisistes que certain auteur français de grand talent accorde à son héros le docteur Lerne, qu'il qualifie de sous dieu».

The pseudonym Alan Mac Clyde was subsequently re-used by another author of English-language erotica in the 1950s.

== Bibliography ==
=== First editions ===
- Mac Clyde, Alan, Bagne de femmes, Librairie Générale, 1931. 8vo. pp. 215. Illustrated by Carlo. Illustrated cover by Ely Costes. BnF:RES P- Y2- 940. 1931. KI:843.8 M126 b2 1930. Librairie Générale., 843.8 M126 b2 1930. Librairie Générale. and "843.8 M126 b2E 1930".
- Mac Clyde, Alan, Dressage, Librairie Générale, 1931. 8vo. pp. 206. Illustrated by Jéo [J.B., Ely Costes et Carlo]. Illustrated cover by Jéo. BnF: RES P- Y2- 939. 1931. BnF: 8- Y2- 90000(1734). Librairie générale. BnF: NUMM-1174775. Librairie générale. BnF: 8-RN-33113). Librairie générale. KI:843.8 M126 d7 1932. Librairie Générale. 1932.
- Mac Clyde, Alan, Cravache et fanfreluches, Librairie Générale, v. 1933. 8vo. pp. 294 + 1 page of errata and 2 pages of catalogue of the Librairie Générale. Illustrated by Maurice Millière. 16 hors-texte en noir sur papier couché dont un double. Et une suite de 5 hors-texte en couleurs sur feuillets volants. Couverture imprimée en noir. BnF: RES P- Y2- 1000(14). KI:843.8 M126 c8 1930. Librairie Générale.
- Mac Clyde, Alan, d'après Jean de La Beuque, La Cité de l'horreur, Librairie Générale, 1933. 8vo. pp. 294. Illustrated by Giffey, René. Illustrated cover. 1 color illustration, 11 B&W illustrations of which one is a double page. BnF: RES P-Y2-1000 (16). Librairie générale. 1933. KI:843.8 M126 c5 1933. Librairie Générale. 1933. and "843.8 M126 c5E 1933".
- Kindler, Edith, traduction de Alan Mac Clyde, La Reine cravache ou La Batteuse d'hommes, Librairie Générale, 1932. 8vo. pp. 218. Illustrated by Carlo. KI:823.8 K52 r3F 1932. Librairie Générale. 1932.
- Kindler, Edith, Préface et traduction de Alan Mac Clyde, Esclavage ou L'Agonie sous le fouet, Librairie Générale, 1934. 8vo. pp. 247. Illustrated by Carlo. Illustrated cover by Carlo. BnF: RES P- Y2- 1000(12). 1934. KI: 823.8 K52 e7F 1932. Librairie Générale. 1932.
- La Beuque fils, Jean de, Préface de Alan Mac Clyde, L'Idole sanglante, Collection A.M.C., 1934. 8vo. pp. 135. Illustrated. Illustrated cover. BnF: RES P- Y2- 1000(11). 1934. KI: 843.8 L122 i2 1934.
- Mac Clyde, Alan, Cuir & peau, Librairie Générale, 1934. 8vo. pp. 280. 20 illustrations and 10 hors texte by René Giffey. Colored illustrated cover by René Giffey. BnF: RES P- Y2- 1000(8). 1934. BL:"P.C.25.a.72". KI:843.8 M126 c9. Librairie Générale. 1934.
- Mac Clyde, Alan, Le Cuir triomphant, Librairie Générale, 1934. 8vo. pp. 263. Illustrated by Carlo. Colored illustrated cover by Carlo. BnF: RES P- Y2- 1000(7). 1934. KI:843.8 M126 c96 1930. Librairie Générale.
- Mac Clyde, Alan, Despotisme féminin, Librairie Générale, 1934. 8vo. pp. 177. Illustrated by Carlo. Illustrated cover by Carlo. BnF: RES P- Y2- 1000(6). 1934. BnF: RES P- Y2- 90000(1735). Librairie générale. 1934. KI:843.8 M126 d4 1930. Librairie Générale.
- Mac Clyde, Alan, Dolorès amazone, Librairie Générale, 1934. 8vo. pp. 223. 21 illustrated by Carlo. Illustrated cover by Carlo. BnF: RES P- Y2- 1000(10). Librairie générale. 1934. KI:843.8 M126 d66 1930. Librairie Générale.
- Mac Clyde, Alan, Servitude, Librairie Générale, 1934. 8vo. pp. 244. Illustrated by Carlo. Illustrated cover by Carlo. BnF: RES P- Y2- 1000(9). 1934. KI:843.8 M126 s4 1930. Librairie Générale..
- Spanking, Joan, Educatrice, Librairie Générale, 1934], 306 p., 9 leaves of plates. Illustrated by René Giffey. BnF: RES P-Y2-1000 (13). Librairie générale. 1934. KI:843.8 L56 i5 1892. Collection Alan Mac Clyde. Librairie Générale. 1934.
- Mac Clyde, Alan, Les Asservies de Slave Island, Collection A.M.C., 84, Bd Diderot, 1935. 8vo. pp. 316. Illustrations et horse-texte de Sao Chang. BnF: RES P- Y2- 1000(30). 1935. KI:843.8 M126 a8 1935. Collection Alan Mac Clyde. Collection A.M.C. 1935. and "843.8 M126 a8E 1900"..
- Mac Clyde, Alan, Dolly, esclave, Librairie artistique et éd. parisienne, 1936. 8vo. pp. 281. Illustrated by Carlo. Illustrated cover by Carlo. BnF: RES P- Y2- 1000(87). 1936. KI:843.8 M126 d6 1930. Librairie Artistique et Édition parisienne réunies.
- Mac Clyde, Alan, La Madone du cuir verni, Librairie artistique, 1937. 8vo. Illustrated by Carlo. Illustrated cover by Carlo. BnF: RES P- Y2- 1000(157). 1937. KI:843.8 M126 m2 1930. Librairie Artistique et Édition Parisienne Réunies. and "843.8 M126 m2E 1930".0.

=== Clandestine reprints ===
- Mac Clyde, Alan, Dressage, Editions "Le chinois" (Eric Losfeld), 1950. 8vo. pp. 182. 1 ff. Coverture en papier gris-vert imprimèe en noir. Dutel, 1435.
- Kindler, Edith, La Reine cravache, Éditions de l'Amazone [Pierre Delalu], London [Paris?], 1956 [v. 1965]. 8vo. pp. 186. 2 ff. Couverture en papier vert pâle imprimée en noir. Dutel, 2317.
- Kindler, Edith, Esclavage ou L'Agonie sous le fouet, Éditions de l'Amazone [Pierre Delalu], London [Paris?], 1956 [v. 1965]. 8vo. pp. 190. 1 ff. Coverture en papier gris imprimèe en bleu. BnF:8- Y2- 90000(1821). Ed. de l'Amazone. 1956. Dutel, 1504.
- Mac Clyde, Alan, Le Cuir triomphant, Edition Fantastiques, rue de la traction, Toulouse, 1957 [v. 1965]. 8vo. pp. 238 1 ff. Couverture en papier glacé rose imprimée en rouge. Dutel, 1323.

=== Reprints ===
- Kindler, Edith, Esclavage ou L'Agonie sous le fouet, traduit de l'anglais par Alan Mac Clyde, Éditions Dominique Leroy, Paris, 1979. 14x22 pp. 243. Couverture en couleurs et 17 illustrations en hors-text de Carlo.
- Mac Clyde, Alan, Despotisme féminin, Éditions Dominique Leroy, Paris, 1980. 14x22 pp. 183+3. Couverture en couleurs et 10 illustrations en hors-text de Carlo.
- Mac Clyde, Alan, Dolorès amazone, Éditions Dominique Leroy, Paris, 1980. 14x22 pp. 226. Couverture en couleurs et 20 illustrations [dont 2 double-pages] en hors-text de Carlo.
- Mac Clyde, Alan, Bagne de femmes, Éditions Dominique Leroy, Paris, 1981. 14x22 pp. 211+3. Couverture en couleurs d'Ely Costes et 16 illustrations en hors-text de Carlo.
- Mac Clyde, Alan, Servitude, Éditions Dominique Leroy, Paris, 1981. 14x22 pp. 244+2. Couverture en couleurs et 21 illustrations en hors-text de Carlo.
- Mac Clyde, Alan, Dressage, Éditions Dominique Leroy, Paris, 1981. 14x22 pp. 204+2. Couverture en couleurs et 9 illustrations en hors-text de Jéo.
- Kindler, Edith,La Reine cravache ou La Batteuse d'hommes, traduit de l'anglais par Alan Mac Clyde, Éditions Dominique Leroy, Paris, 1987. pp. 215. Couverture en couleurs et 23 illustrations en hors-text de Carlo.
- Mac Clyde, Alan, Dolly, esclave, Éditions Dominique Leroy, Paris, 1982. 14x22 pp. 281+11. Couverture en couleurs et 14 illustrations en hors-text de Carlo.
- Mac Clyde, Alan, La Madone du cuir verni, Éditions Dominique Leroy, Paris, 1989. 14x22 pp. 262+14. Couverture en couleurs et 6 illustrations en hors-text de Carlo.
- Mac Clyde, Alan, Le Cuir triomphant, Éditions Dominique Leroy, Paris, 1980. 14x22 pp. 261. Couverture en couleurs et 35 illustrations en hors-text de Carlo.
