= Alan Mac Clyde (1950s novelist) =

Author of English-language erotic novels, active in the 1950s

Alan Mac Clyde or Alan McClyde is the name used in the 1950s by the Paris-based publishers of some English-language erotica: Patrick Garnot of Pall Mall Press and Bronislaw Kaminsky, a.k.a. Bruno Durocher, of Week End Books both located in 5, rue Gît-le-Cœur, Paris. The pseudonym Alan Mac Clyde had previously been used by another author of French-language erotica in the 1930s.

== Bibliography ==
=== First editions ===
- MacClyde, Alan, The Passionate Lash or The Revenge of Sir Hilary Garner, Pall Mall Press, 5, rue Git-le-Cœur, Paris. 17.5 x 11.5 cm. pp. 209. BnF: "8- Y2- 90000(1036)".
- McClyde, Alan [sic], The Passionate Lash or The Revenge of Sir Hilary Garner, 1958, Pall Mall Press, Paris. 16 x 11 cm. pp. 160. Gray and red wrappers. BL:"YA.1996.a.13379". LoC:"PZ4.M1267 Pas (Delta)". KI:843.8 M126 p2E 1950. Pall Mall Press. Archived from the original on 2022-02-14.
- MacClyde, Alan, The Cruise of "The Bizarre", Week End Books, c. 1958. pp. 185. Pale green wrappers printed in black. BL:"P.C.13.h.26".
- McClyde, Alan [sic], The Slaves of Elizabeth Fale, n.p. Paris c.1958. Printed light yellow wrappers with canary yellow interior pages. 160pp.
- Mc Clyde, Alan [sic], S.O.S.O.: Society of Slave Owners, s.n., s.d. [c. 1950-60 ?]. 8vo. pp. 125. Plain white card in printed blue paper wraps.

=== American editions and reprints ===
- McClyde, Alan [sic], The Slaves of Elizabeth Fale, Gargoyle Press, 1968. 12mo (over 6¾"-7¾" tall). Pp. 218. Reprint of The Passionate Lash
- McClyde, Alan [sic], The Cruise of "The Bizarre", [Montreal?], Bizarre Pub. Co., 22 cm. pp. 185. LoC:"PZ4.M1267 Cr (Delta)".
- McClyde, Alan, Susan, or the Ravaged Innocent Unveiled, Gargoyle Press, 1968. Pp. 219. Reprint of The Cruise of "The Bizarre"
- McClyde, Alan [sic], The Cruise of "The Bizarre", Collector’s Publications (Series no. 21223), Industry, CA, 1968 16 cm. Pp. 161+ads.
- MacClyde, Alan, The Calamities of Jane, New York, Grove Press, 1971?. pp. 155. 18 cm. LoC:PR6063.A1636 C3. Venus library. Grove Press. 1971. LCCN 73163558. KI: 823.8 M11122 c2 1971.
