= Experimental Lecture =

English pornographic book published in 1878

Experimental Lecture is an English pornographic book privately printed and published in 1878-1879 by the pseudonym "Colonel Spanker" with a false date of 1836.The Colonel and his circle have a house in Park Lane where genteel young ladies are kidnapped, humiliated, and flagellated. Pisanus Fraxi (alias of Henry Spencer Ashbee) claims the book is "from the pen of its publisher," which is widely believed to be William Lazenby.

Fraxi describes it as "coldly cruel and unblushingly indecent"; Bloch describes it as "completely sadistic"; Simpson describes it as focussed on anti-female violence.
