= James Glass Bertram =

British author (1824–1892)

James Glass Bertram (1824 – 3 March 1892) was a British author.

He was apprenticed to Tait's Edinburgh Magazine and became managing clerk, before joining a company of strolling players. He returned to Edinburgh and set up as a bookseller and newsagent. In 1855 he was appointed the editor of the North Briton and in 1872 of the Glasgow News, leaving to become a freelance journalist two years later.

Bertram's output included pornography on the theme of flagellation, such as Flagellation and the Flagellants: A History of the Rod published in 1868 under the pseudonym of "Revd William Cooper" and Personal Recollections of the Use of the Rod as "Margaret Anson", published by John Camden Hotten.

He also wrote works on sport under the pseudonym Ellangowan (named after a location in Walter Scott's novel Guy Mannering), notably Sporting anecdotes: being anecdotal annals, descriptions, tales and incidents of horse-racing, betting, card-playing, pugilism, gambling, cock-fighting, pedestrianism, fox-hunting, angling, shooting, and other sports, collected and edited by him and published in London, 1889.

== Publications ==
- The Border Angler (1858)
- The Harvest of the Sea (1865)
- Flagellation and the Flagellants: A History of the Rod (1877 edition)
- Some Memories of Books, Authors and Events (1893)

== See also ==
- Ordnance Gazetteer of Scotland: A Graphic and Accurate Description of Every Place in Scotland (Bertram contributed its section on Scotland's deer forests and grouse moors)
