= Hugues Rebell =

French writer

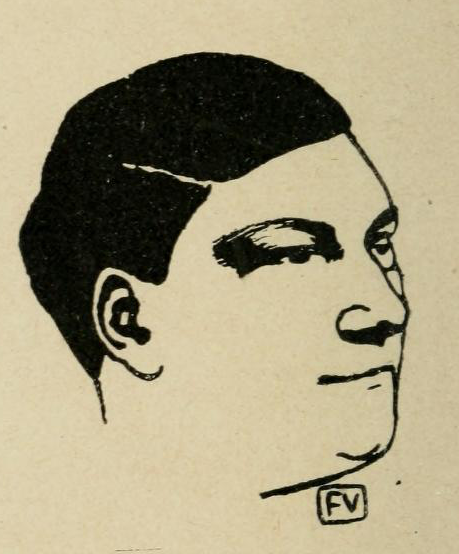
Rebell c1898 by Félix Vallotton

Georges Grassal de Choffat or Hugues Rebell (27 October 1867 in Nantes – 6 March 1905 in Paris) was a French author. He wrote against Christianity and professed paganism while remaining a Catholic. An exponent of Friedrich Nietzsche, he was associated with the right-wing nationalist group Action Française.

Rebell wrote a number of pornographic works under the group pseudonym "Jean de Villiot", a prolific contributor to early 20th century French spanking literature, published by Charles Carrington.

Rebell is often dismissed as a failed author of pornography, remembered for only one title, Les nuits chaudes du Cap Français (1902), which won the Prix Nocturne in 1966. He was also a poet, whose Les Chants de la pluie et du soleil, dedicated to his friend René Boylesve, inspired André Gide in Les Nourritures Terrestres. He was also known as a polemicist of royalty because of his Union des trois aristocraties (1894), which treated the three aristocracies based on family name, money, and talent.

He wrote articles for the journals La Cocarde and Le Soleil, which were included in a collection of writings published in 1994 under the title De mon balcon. He wrote a defence of Oscar Wilde in the August issue of the literary magazine Mercure de France in 1895.

== Sources ==
- Marius Boisson, Hugues Rebell, intime, Paris, Seheur, 1930.
- Hubert Juin, Écrivains de l’avant-siècle, Paris, Seghers, 1972.
- Thierry Rodange, Le diable quitte la table ou La vie passionnée d'Hugues Rebell, Paris, Mercure de France, 1994.
