= BDSM in culture and media =

Stories, books and media about bondage

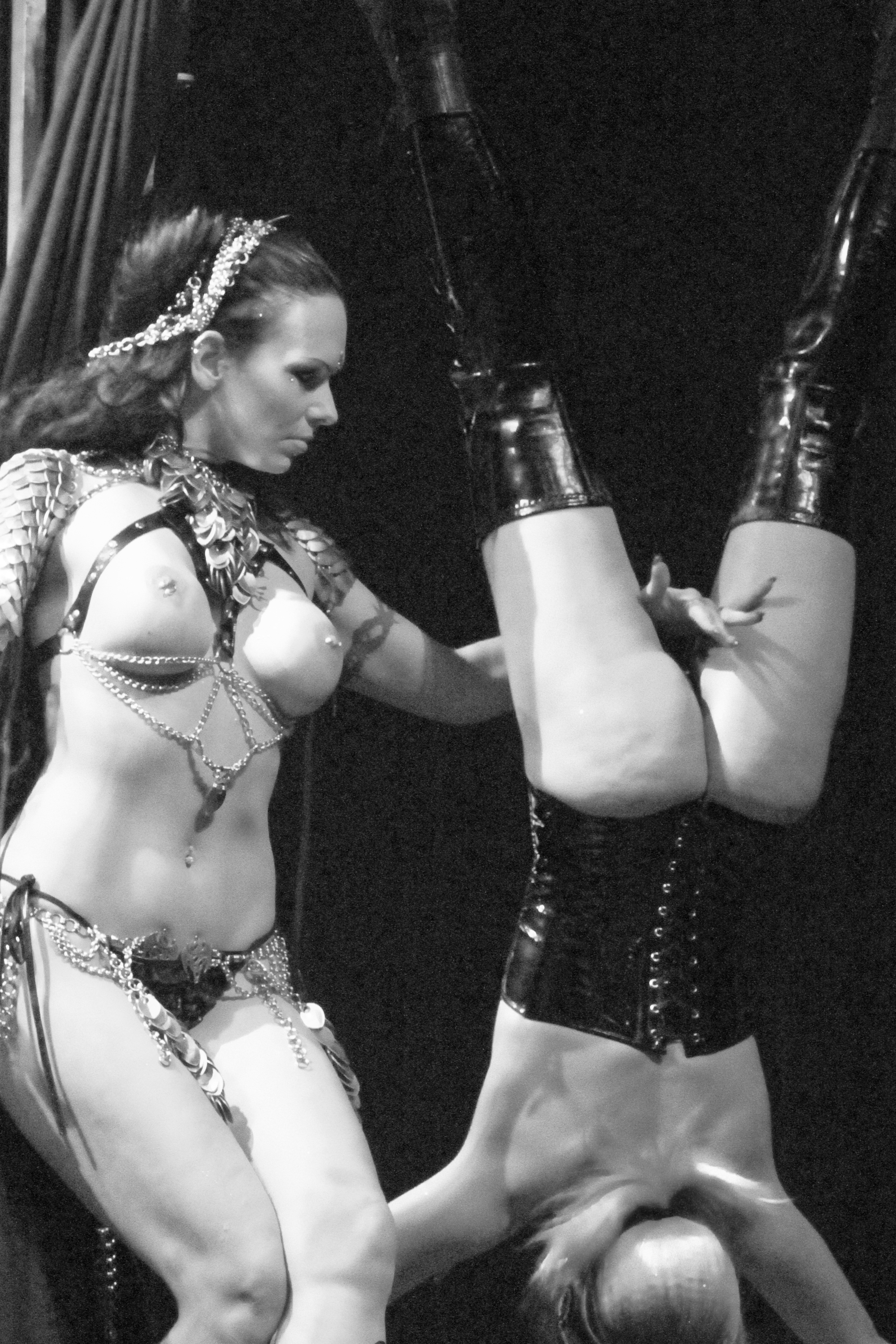
On stage BDSM show during a performance from Umbra et Imago at Wave Gotik Treffen music and arts global festival in Germany, 2014

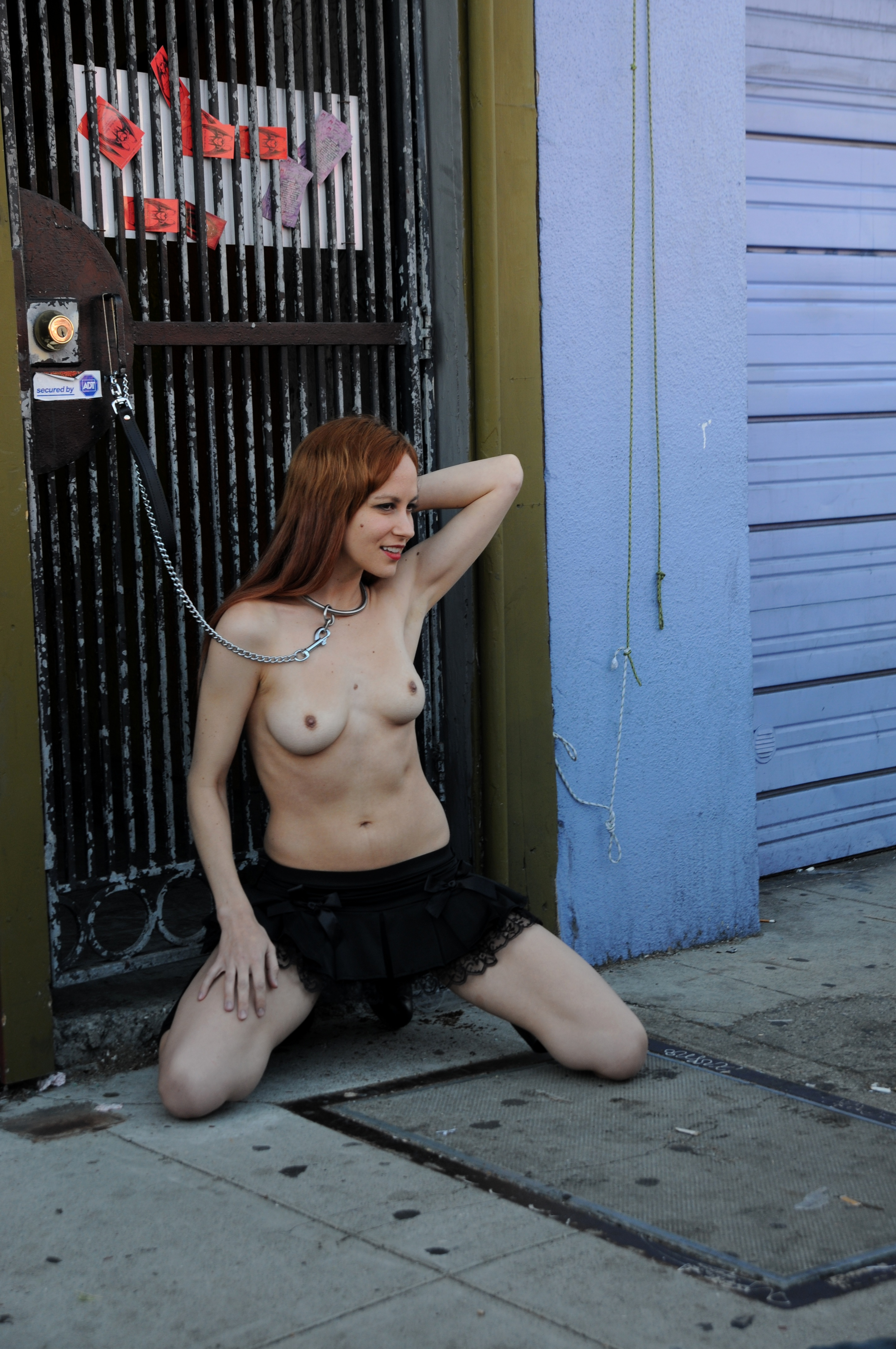
Sexual roleplayer in a kajira pose at Folsom Street Fair, a U.S. based BDSM fest. The woman is posing in an approximation to nadu, the typical position of a "pleasure slave" in Gorean subculture.

BDSM (meaning Bondage and discipline (B&D), Dominance and submission (D&s), and Sadomasochism (or S&M)) is a frequent theme in culture and media, including in books, films, video games, television, music, magazines, public performances and online media.

== Newspapers and magazines ==
During the late 20th and early 21st centuries, a variety of periodicals were published on the subject of BDSM. Small independent publishing companies and organized groups were both active in this field, though many have since ceased publication or transferred to online publishing. The German-language Schlagzeilen magazine started in 1988 as the group's internal newspaper and is an important BDSM publication in German-speaking countries today.

Events and figures related to BDSM have also appeared in the media. For example, in 2002, an article in the Washington Post publicly highlighted the leadership in the Washington, DC BDSM and leather community of Jack McGeorge, a munitions analyst for the U.N. Monitoring, Verification and Inspection Commission. Following this, several commentators compared his BDSM activities with the torture techniques used by Saddam Hussein's administration in Iraq. Others compared today's discrimination of BDSM practitioners with the situation of homosexuals in the past.

In Germany EMMA, a well-known feminist magazine, published by Alice Schwarzer, pursued its PorNO campaign against hatred towards women and violent pornography aiming to ban pornography in Germany. In it, Schwarzer states, among other things, that sadomasochistic practices are generally to be equated with violence against women. Her judgment on female sadomasochism ("Female masochism is collaboration!") has often been criticized for implying a state of war between genders. EMMA magazine criticized Helmut Newton, accusing him of "pornografization of fashion photography", and criticized his "therein unrestrainedly realized sadomasochistic obsessions".

BDSM support groups and publications have repeatedly criticized biased media coverage of BDSM.

== Literature ==
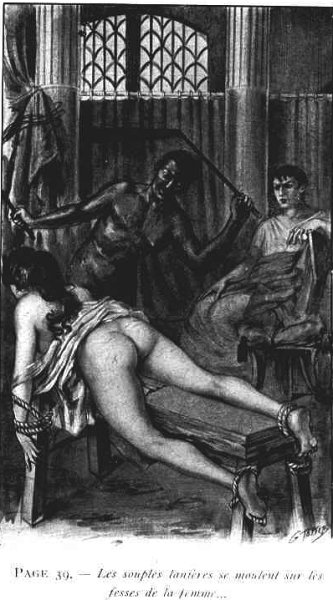
Georges Topfer illustration on a Jean de Virgans book (1922), representing a bound woman's flogging in Ancient Rome

Sadomasochism is a perennial theme in literature and has inspired several classics like The Story of O by Anne Desclos (under the pseudonym Pauline Réage), Venus in Furs by Leopold von Sacher-Masoch, and the comics created by Eric Stanton. A literary curiosity concerning sadomasochism is Martha's letter to Leopold Bloom in Ulysses by James Joyce.

The novel Nine and a Half Weeks: A Memoir of a Love Affair published in 1978 by Ingeborg Day (under the pseudonym Elizabeth McNeill) was the basis of the Hollywood movie 9½ Weeks. Justine Ettler's The River Ophelia (1995) details the empty, sometimes violent sex lives of university students and yuppies with surreal overtones.

Author Anne Rice published under the pseudonym A. N. Roquelaure three installments of her Sleeping Beauty Trilogy (The Claiming of Sleeping Beauty, 1983), Beauty's Punishment (1984) and Beauty's Release (1985) with explicit BDSM themes.

A nine-volume book series published in July 2006 under the title Bild-Erotik-Bibliothek by Bild-Zeitung, Germany's leading Tabloid and the best-selling newspaper in Europe, in cooperation with Random House gives a clear indication of the commercial potential of the topic. Out of nine installments, three books had a well-defined emphasis on sadomasochism, specifically BDSM. Besides Exit to Eden, also written by Anne Rice under the pseudonym Anne Rampling, it also further featured the sadomasochist classic Story of O. and the explicit novel Topping from Below by Laura Reese.

The Fifty Shades trilogy is a series of popular erotic romance novels by E. L. James which involve BDSM. The series has had a notably mixed reception from the community itself; while it has been praised for bringing BDSM into the mainstream, they have also received heavy criticism for inaccurate portrayals of the subculture. In response to this, BDSM works published after the trilogy have often had a greater focus on consent and agency, such as Penny Aimes' For the Love of April French.

Alfred Kinsey stated in his 1953 nonfiction book Sexual Behavior in the Human Female that 12% of females and 22% of males reported having an erotic response to a sadomasochistic story. In that book erotic responses to being bitten were given as:

| Erotic responses | By females | By males |
|---|---|---|
| Definite and/or frequent | 26% | 26% |
| Some response | 29% | 24% |
| Never | 45% | 50% |
| Number of cases | 2,200 | 567 |

=== Publishers ===
In the last decades, publishing houses and imprints specializing in BDSM fiction and nonfiction have been founded in many Western countries, including Circlet Press, Daedalus Publishing, Greenery Press and Nexus Books, an imprint of Virgin Books.

=== Specialist books ===
In November 1981, Samois published Coming to Power: Writing and graphics on Lesbian S/M, which reached a worldwide audience the following year when it was reprinted by Alyson Publications. The book combined short stories with basic explanations and safety tips about BDSM practices. It is considered the first introductory books on the subject worldwide. Its concept was internationally adopted by many publications in the following decades.

Other than specialized books with strong emphasis on the practice, there is a growing number of scientific publications and books that discuss BDSM philosophy and culture:

- Jay Wiseman: SM 101: A Realistic Introduction. Greenery Press (California) 1998, ISBN 0-9639763-8-9 (comprehensive reference book including topics like "BDSM as a lifestyle" and "BDSM during pregnancy")
- Philip Miller, Molly Devon: Screw the Roses, Send Me the Thorns: The Romance and Sexual Sorcery of Sadomasochism. Mystic Rose Books, 1995. ISBN 0-9645960-0-8 (showing plenty of graphics, the comprehensive reference book gives advice on practices and safety advice)
- Dossie Easton, Janet W. Hardy: The New Topping Book. Greenery Press (California) 2002, ISBN 1-890159-36-0 (practical and theoretical introduction for Tops with emphasis on psychological, practical and technological aspects and detailed advice on partner search)
- Dossie Easton, Janet W. Hardy: The New Bottoming Book. Greenery Press (California) 1998, ISBN 1-890159-35-2 (practical and theoretical introduction for Bottoms with emphasis on psychological, practical and technological aspects and detailed advice on partner search)
- Patrick Califia (ed.), Robin Sweeney (ed.):The Second Coming: A Leatherdyke Reader. Alyson Publications 1996, ISBN 1-55583-281-4 (sequel to the lesbian-feminist BDSM-classic Coming to Power)
- Mark Thompson (ed.): Leatherfolk: Radical Sex, People, Politics, and Practice. Alyson Publications 1991, ISBN 1-55583-630-5, (28 essays of well-known sadomasochistic authors and activists)
- Lady Green (ed.), Jaymes Easton (ed.): Kinky Crafts: 101 Do-It-Yourself S/M Toys. Greenery Press (California) 1998, ISBN 0-9639763-7-0 (comprehensive Guide to do-it-yourself BDSM-toys)
- Gloria Brame, William Brame & John Jacobs: Different Loving: The World of Sexual Dominance and Submission. Villard, 1996, ISBN 978-0679769569
- Peggy J. Kleinplatz, Charles Allen Moser: Sadomasochism - Powerful Pleasures. Haworth Press, 2006, ISBN 978-1-56023-640-5
- Staci Newmahr: Playing On The Edge. Indiana University Press, 2011, ISBN 978-0253222855 (sociological examination of BDSM community in an unnamed city)
- Margot Weiss: Techniques of Pleasure. Duke University Press, 2011, ISBN 978-0822351597 (anthropological examination of San Francisco BDSM community)
- Clarisse Thorn: The S & M Feminist. Clarisse Thorn, 2012, ISBN 978-1477472040 (essays on BDSM, gender and culture)
- Lee Harrington, Mollena Williams: Playing Well With Others. Greenery Press, 2012, ISBN 978-0937609583 (guide to the BDSM community)
- Anne O. Nomis The History & Arts of the Dominatrix. Mary Egan Publishing & Anna Nomis Ltd, UK, 2013, ISBN 978-0-9927010-0-0 (academic account of dominatrix imagery)
- Rajan Dominari: Welcome to the Darkside: A BDSM Primer. AKO Publishing Company, 2019, ISBN 978-1734527100 (introduction to the BDSM community and culture)

== Marketing ==
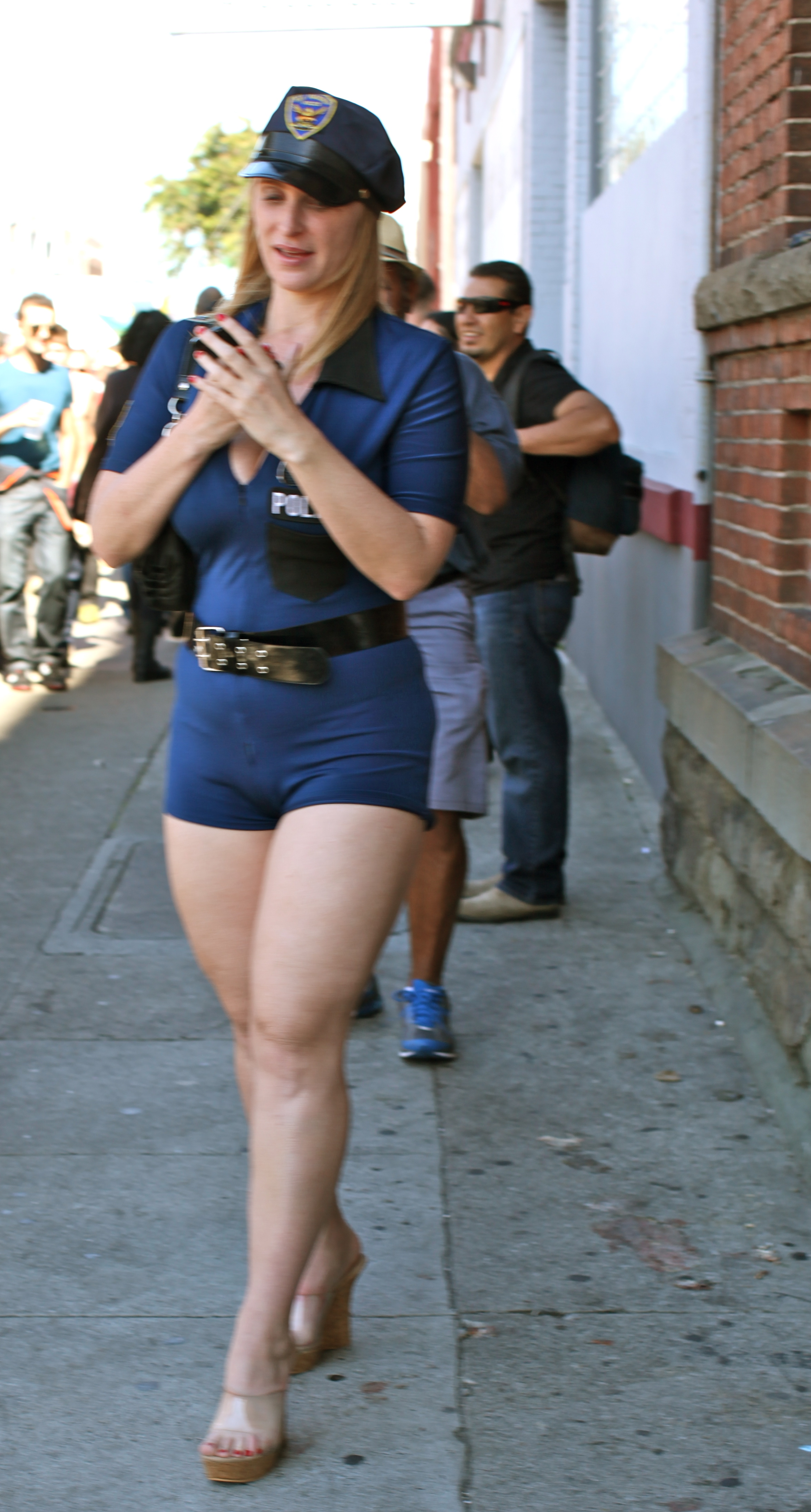
A woman performs sexual roleplay using fetishized uniform of a lady cop, at Folsom Street Fair.

Since the beginning of the 1990s, BDSM imagery has been regularly used within the framework of large marketing campaigns in continental Europe. Widely known examples in Germany are billboards of the cigarette brands Camel and West, showing a camel dressed in "typical" leather outfit, respectively a dominatrix with a whip. While West had to withdraw the ad due to "offense against morality", BDSM motifs were utilized in the following years on a regular basis. In March 2007 the Swedish clothing company H&M promoted the sale of a collection compiled by Madonna with television commercials in Germany. The commercials showed the artist, who has been repeatedly criticized for the use of sadomasochistic subjects in the past, as a dominant lifestyle-icon teaching a lesson to an "inappropriately" dressed female pupil under the cracking of a crop, redesigning her outfit while making fashion statements like "Don't think it – you need to know it".

In Canada, Mini presented the winter package 2005/2005 of the Mini-Cooper in the form of an interactive BDSM-session in which the user, supported by a dominatrix, can test different kinds of spanking tools on the automobile in order to get the optional equipment explained. Their slogan was "Dominate winter".

In the U.S., Anheuser-Busch has repeatedly sponsored the fetish-lifestyle Folsom Street Fair in San Francisco. Diesel jeans ran several sadomasochistic-themed advertisements in various fashion magazines.

== Music ==
The Velvet Underground song "Venus in Furs" (from The Velvet Underground & Nico) is based on a book by Masoch of the same title; the name of the band itself comes from a book about paraphilias (including BDSM) in the United States.

Eurythmics "Sweet Dreams (Are Made of This)" may be the most well-known popular song with BDSM connotations, primarily due to the music video.

Adam Lambert's "For Your Entertainment", Puddle of Mudd's "Control", and Madonna's "Erotica" are explicitly from the dominant's point of view - as is "Baby Let's Play Rough" by the country-western vampire singer Unknown Hinson, whereas Nedra Johnson's "Alligator Food" and Lady Gaga's "Teeth" are written from the perspective of the submissive.

Jace Everett's "Bad Things" (the theme song of the TV series True Blood) alludes to BDSM.

The German punk band Die Ärzte recorded the song "Sweet, Sweet Gwendoline" that introduced the BDSM-related character Sweet Gwendoline to a large part of the population that otherwise had no contact to the BDSM subculture. German gothic rock band Umbra et Imago, famous amongst the fetish goth scene, also recorded a song entitled "Sweet Gwendoline".

Industrial music in general likely has the most BDSM themes, as well as being one of the biggest influences on Rivethead fashion. Rammstein is one of those industrial bands, as their song "Ich Tu Dir Weh (I hurt you)" is about BDSM. Depeche Mode are known for their BDSM undertones, "Master and Servant" being a well-known example.

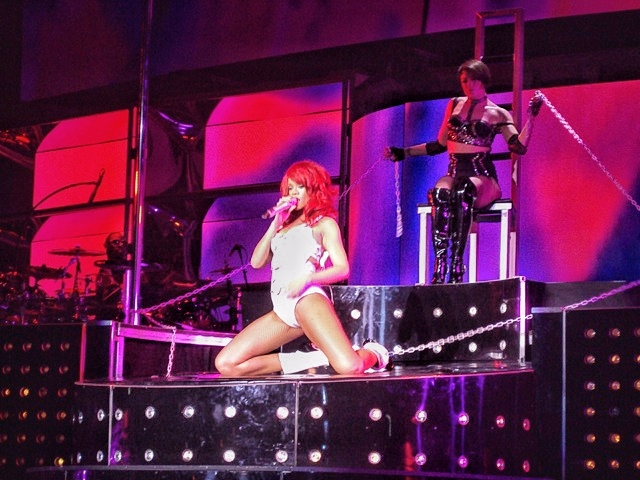
Rihanna (wearing white) performs S&M while chained during the Loud Tour in 2011. Her dominatrix (wearing black) is sitting in the background.

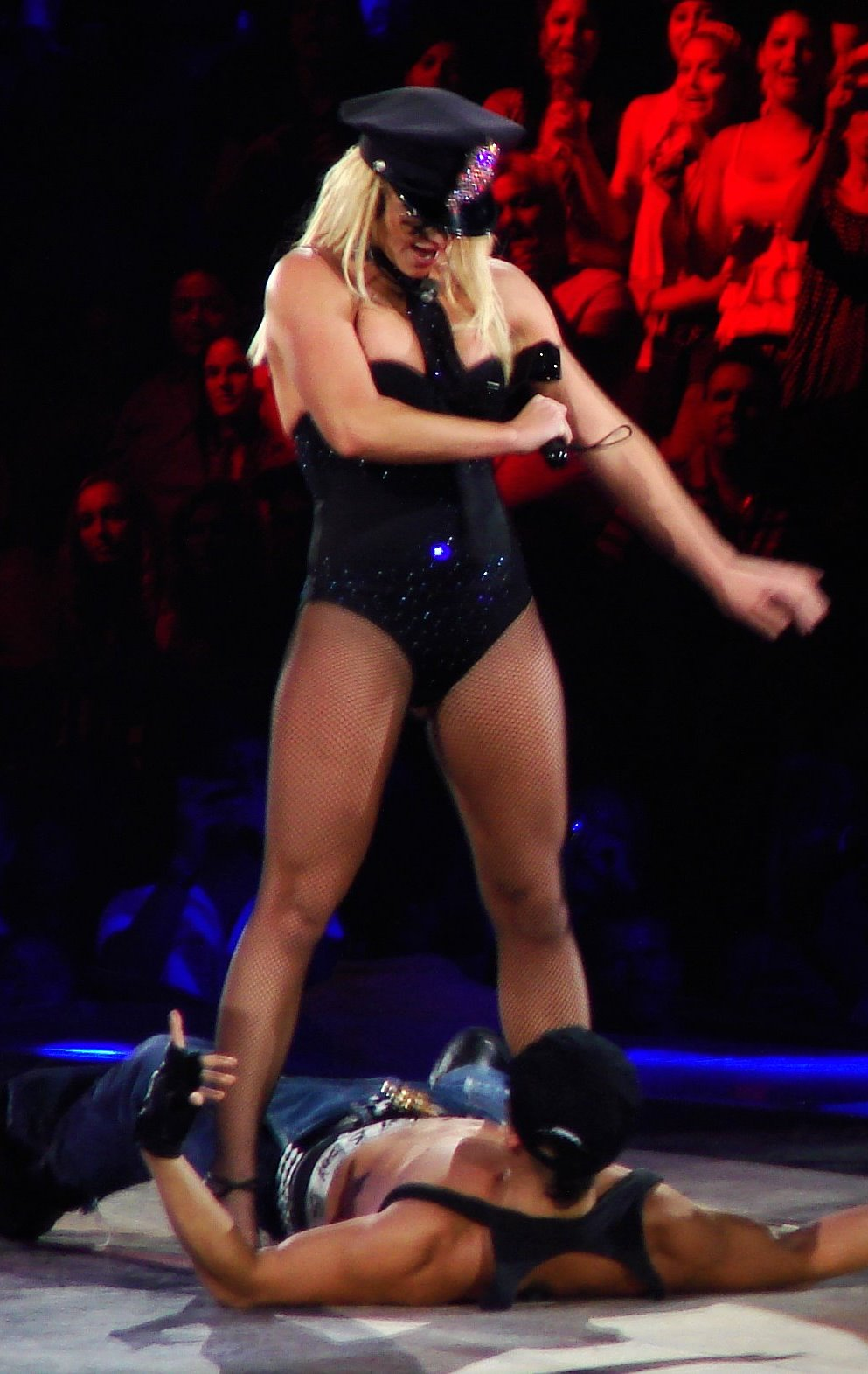
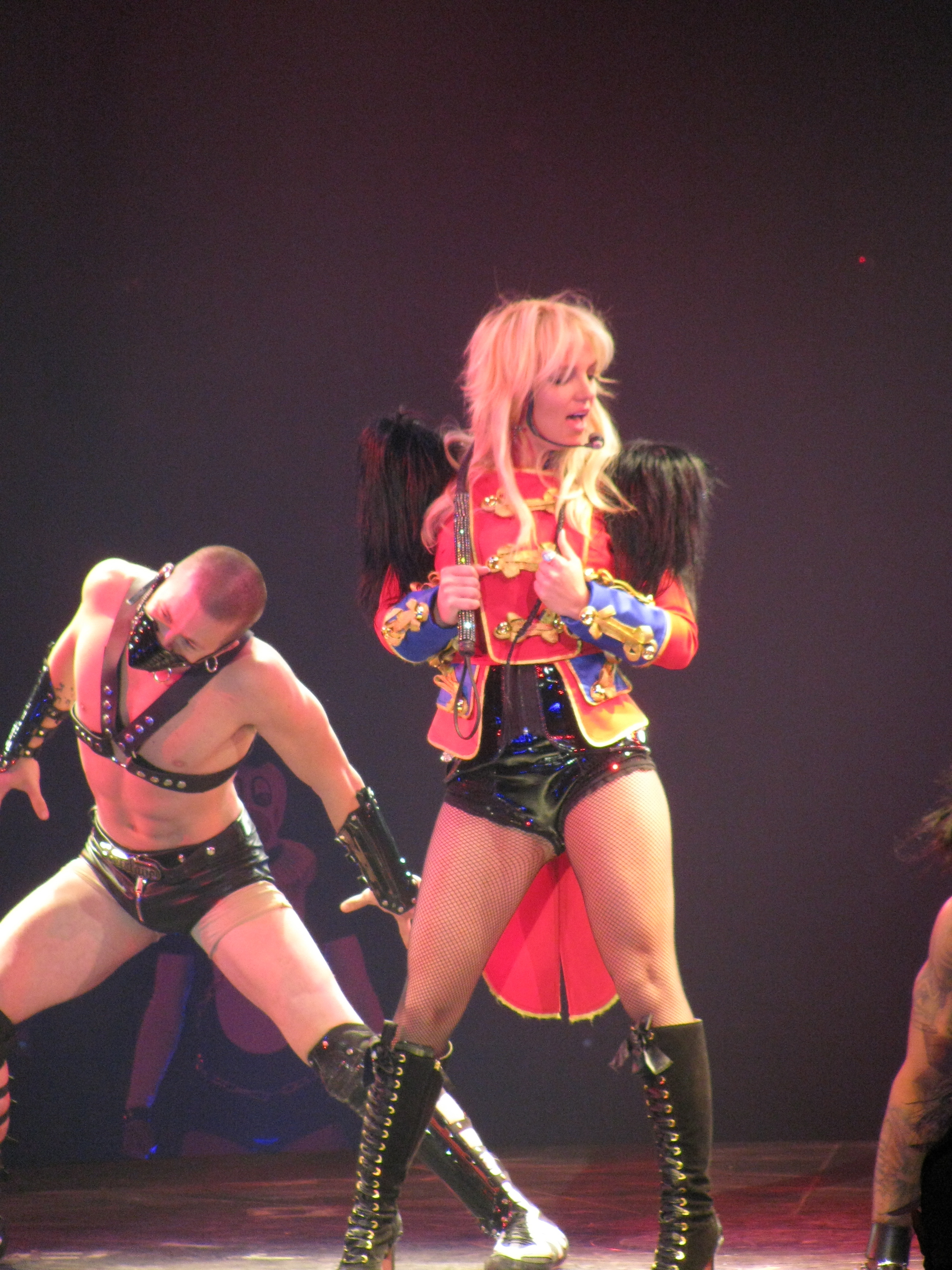
Britney Spears acting as a dominatrix while performing on Womanizer song (left), and on Circus song (right), in The Circus Tour

Other famous songs with BDSM themes include:

- 2 Live Crew "S and M"
- Adam and the Ants "Whip in My Valise"
- Ali Project "Hizamazuite Ashi o Oname"
- Blue Öyster Cult "Dominance and Submission"
- Blood on the Dance Floor "Call Me Master" and "Safe Word"
- Boondox "Freak Bitch"
- Ellie Goulding "Love Me Like You Do"
- Frank Zappa "Carolina Hardcore Extacy"
- Green Day "Blood Sex and Booze" and "Dominated Love Slave"
- Guns N' Roses' "Pretty Tied Up" from the band's album Use Your Illusion II
- Janet Jackson "Rope Burn" (The Velvet Rope, 1997)
- Måneskin "I Wanna Be Your Slave"
- The Misfits "Devil's Whorehouse"
- Nickelback "Figured You Out"
- Lords of Acid "The Power is mine"
- Strung Out "Ultimate Devotion"
- Nine Inch Nails "Closer", "Discipline", "Happiness in Slavery", "Meet Your Master" and "Sin"
- Rihanna's album Loud features an opening song called "S&M", which is about sadism and masochism as its name suggests and as the music video makes clear.
- Spooncurve "Hurt me, I'm Yours"
- Tarkan "Ölürüm Sana"
- That Dog "Gagged and Tied"
- The Plasmatics "Black Leather Monster" and "Sex Junkie"
- Thin Lizzy's 1979 album Roisin Dubh (Black Rose) included a song called "S&M" about a sadistic man.
- William Control "Price We Pay"

In 2010, Christina Aguilera released her Bionic album which contains the single "Not Myself Tonight". The controversial, high-concept video for the single is rife with aggressive BDSM imagery. Aguilera is seen as a bound and gagged slave as well as a latex-clad dominatrix with a riding crop and a group of look-alike slave girls.

Also released in 2010, rock band Thirty Seconds to Mars's music video for "Hurricane", directed by Jared Leto under his pseudonym Bartholomew Cubbins, includes elements of bondage and discipline, dominance and submission. Though initially banned from most networks due to violence and heavy sexual content, the video received three nominations at the 2011 MTV Video Music Awards for Best Cinematography, Best Direction and Best Editing.

== Art ==
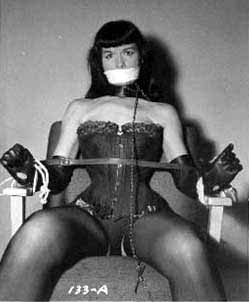
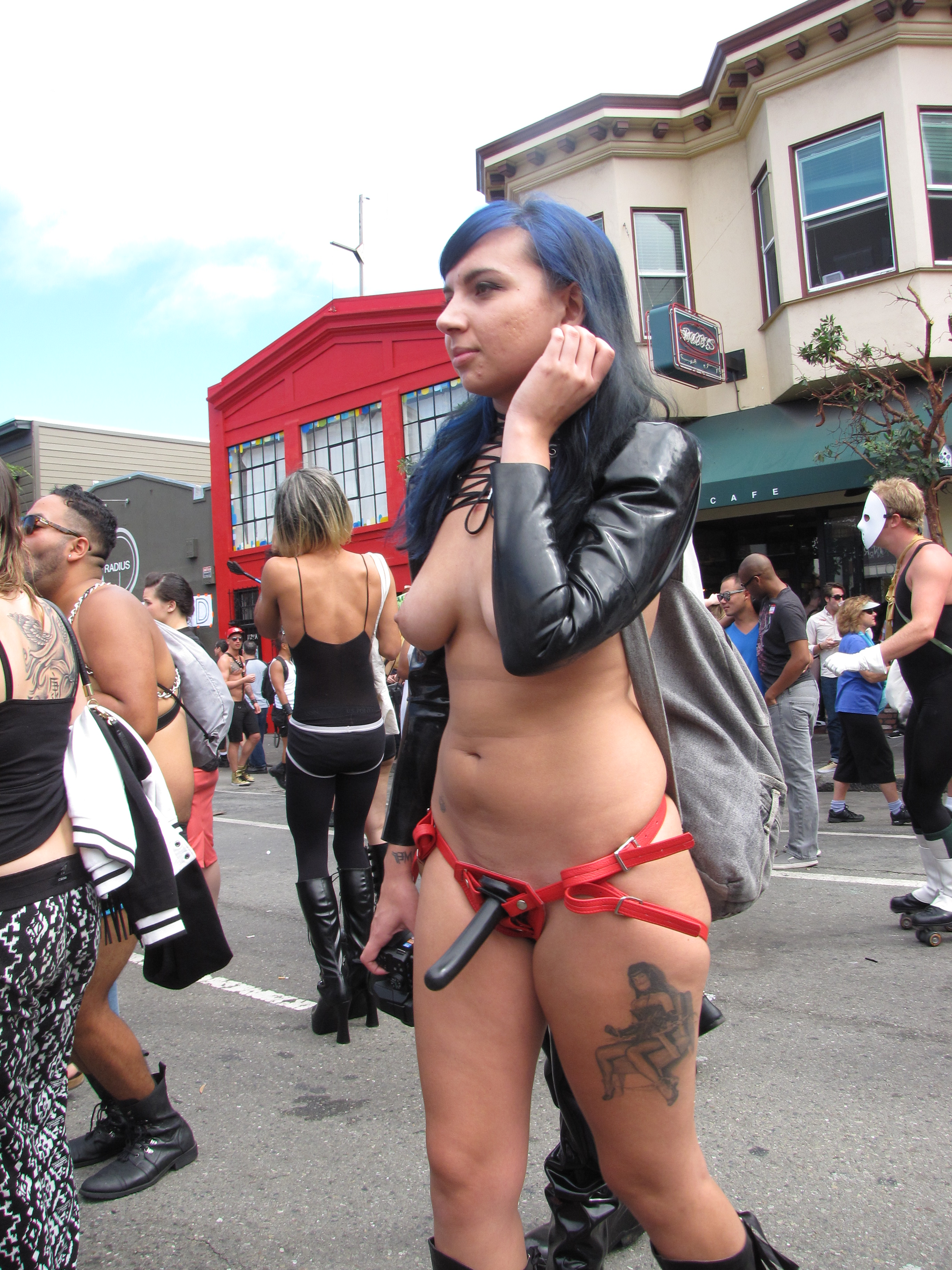
Bettie Page, the first famous bondage model, in the 1950s (left). A woman at Folsom Street Fair, wearing a strap-on dildo and having a tattoo of Bettie Page in bondage (right).

Comic book drawings: John Willie with Adventures of Sweet Gwendoline (published as a serial in Robert Harrison's mainstream girlie magazine Wink from June 1947 to February 1950 and later in several other magazines over the years), Guido Crepax with Histoire d'O (1975)

- In graphic design: Works by Eric Stanton, Hajime Sorayama and Robert Bishop
- In art deco sculpture: Bruno Zach produced a dominatrix sculpture called "The Riding Crop" (c. 1925).

=== Fashion ===
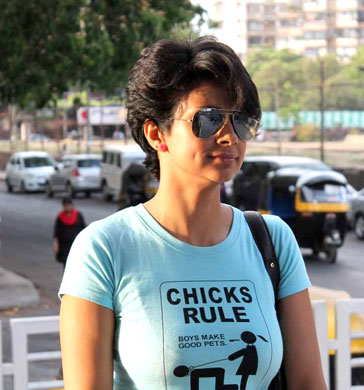
Indian actress Gul Panag wearing a T-shirt depicting a male slave on a leash held by a female owner

Malcolm McLaren and Vivienne Westwood created several restrictive BDSM-inspired clothing items of punk fashion for the 1970s punk subculture; in particular bondage trousers, which connect the wearer's legs with straps.

A table in Larry Townsend's The Leatherman's Handbook II (the 1983 second edition; the 1972 first edition did not include this list) which is generally considered authoritative states that a black handkerchief is a symbol for sadomasochism and a grey handkerchief is a symbol for bondage in the handkerchief code, which is employed usually among gay male casual-sex seekers or BDSM practitioners in the United States, Canada, Australia, and Europe. Wearing the handkerchief on the left indicates the top, dominant, or active partner; right the bottom, submissive, or passive partner. However, negotiation with a prospective partner remains important because, as Townsend noted, people may wear hankies of any color "only because the idea of the hankie turns them on" or "may not even know what it means".

=== Photography ===
- Charles Guyette is best remembered for his fetish photographs, some of which featured sadomasochistic content.
- Robert Mapplethorpe's most controversial works documented and examined the homosexual male BDSM subculture of New York City in the late 1960s and early 1970s.
- Barbara Nitke's photo book, Kiss of Fire: A Romantic View of Sadomasochism (2003) was among the first mainstream publications to examine the subject of BDSM.
- Ellen Von Unwerth's photography often features themes related to dominance and submission, female sexuality and Femdom. Her photography feature models and celebrities who take on role or character. One such celebrity photoshoot involved Rihanna playing the role of dominatrix.
- Helmut Newton has been described as the "King of Kink" for choosing themes of BDSM, Femdom and power play in narrative photography.

=== Theatre ===
- Worauf sich Körper kaprizieren, Austria. Peter Kern directed this present-day adaption of Jean Genet's 1950 film, Un chant d'amour. It is about a dominant lady (film veteran Miriam Goldschmidt) who submits her husband (Heinrich Herkie) and butler (Günter Bubbnik) to sadistic treatment.
- Ach, Hilde (Oh, Hilda), Germany. This play by Anna Schwemmer shows a young Hilde, after being left by her boyfriend, becomes a professional dominatrix.

== Film and television ==
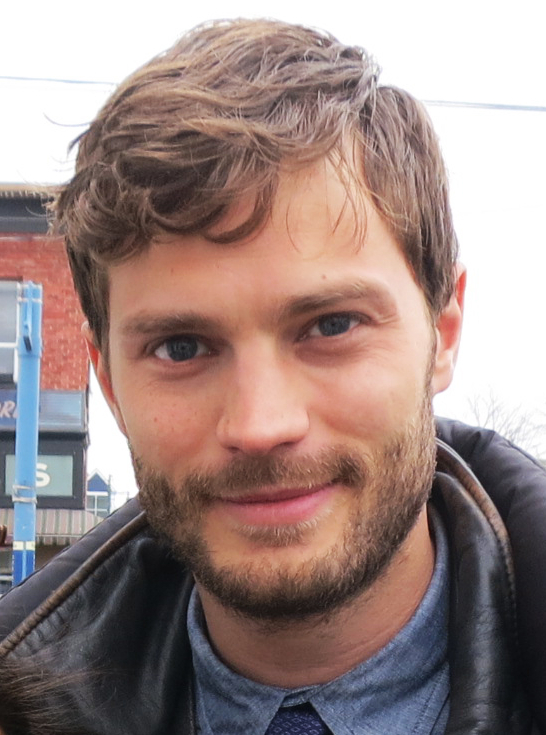
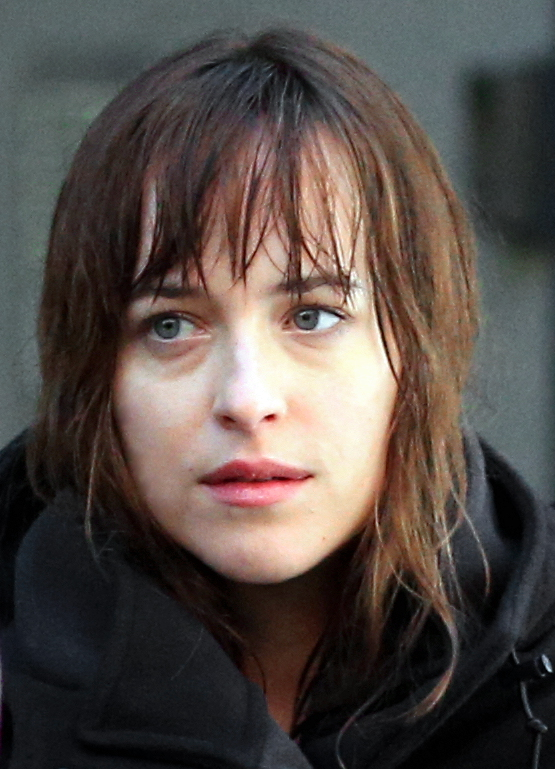
Fifty Shades film trilogy actors Jamie Dornan and Dakota Johnson
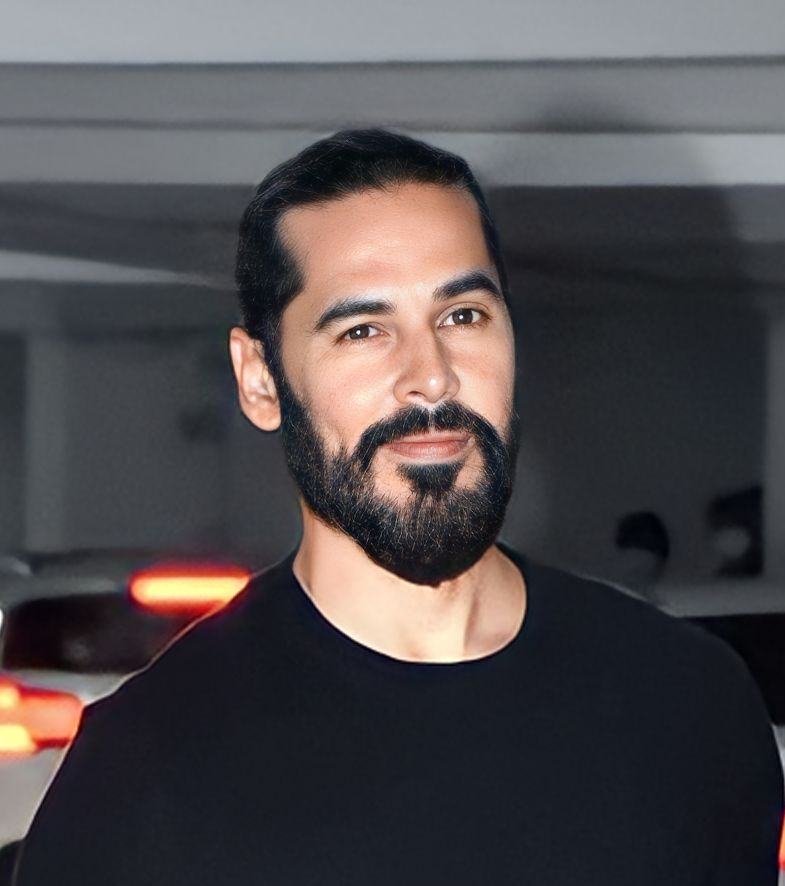
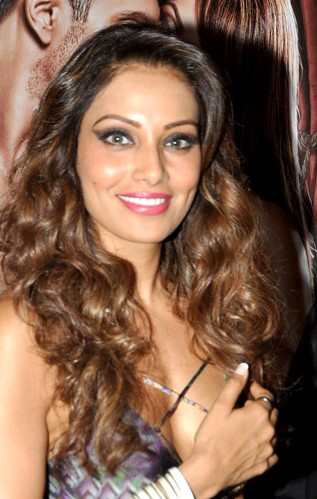
Raaz (2002) actors Dino Morea and Bipasha Basu

While BDSM activity appeared initially quasi-"subliminally" in some movies, in the 1960s and 1970s there were film adaptations of famous works of BDSM literature including Venus in Furs (1969) and the Story of O (1975).

In the 1960s and 1970s Spanish director Jess Franco developed several movies that were typical examples of the exploitation-genres' approach, often based on the works of the Marquis de Sade and censored in many countries worldwide.

With the release of the 1986 film 9½ Weeks, the topic of BDSM was transferred to broader audiences with high impact and notable commercial success. Since the late 1990s movies like Preaching to the Perverted (1997), a movie generally considered a reaction to Operation Spanner, and Secretary (2002) started to increasingly reconcile financial demands with authenticity.

From the 1990s to the early 2000s, mainstream media representation of alternative sexualities, including BDSM, increased dramatically. First noted in 1983, this trend shows no signs of abating today.

Raaz (2002) is widely considered Bollywood's first BDSM film — a dark romance where control, submission, and desire are central themes.

With the development of documentary productions such as SICK: The Life and Death of Bob Flanagan, Supermasochist (1997), Bound for Pleasure (2002), Wir leben ... SM! (2004), Graphic Sexual Horror (2009) and KinK (2013), an increasingly broader approach to the subject matter is developing, targeting wider audiences.

During the last four decades, the spectrum of productions has been greatly enlarged, showing the topic has arrived in mainstream movies:

- 1925: A Woman of the World (Based on The Tattooed Countess by Carl van Vechten)
- 1967: Belle de jour, by Luis Buñuel
- 1967: Venus in Furs by Joseph Marzano
- 1967: Chijin no Ai (A Fool's Love), film adaptation of Jun'ichirō Tanizaki's Naomi (novel)
- 1968: La prisonnière, - H. G. Clouzot
- 1969: Venus in Furs by Massimo Dallamano (not the Jess Franco version, also from 1969)
- 1969: The Frightened Woman by Piero Schivazappa
- 1972: The Bitter Tears of Petra von Kant by Rainer Werner Fassbinder
- 1974: The Night Porter by Liliana Cavani
- 1974: Swept Away by an Unusual Destiny in the Blue Sea of August
- 1975: Salò, or the 120 Days of Sodom by Pier Paolo Pasolini
- 1975: Story of O
- 1975: Maîtresse
- 1976: In the Realm of the Senses by Nagisa Oshima
- 1976: The Image (The Punishment of Anne)
- 1978: The Mafu Cage
- 1982: Cat People
- 1983: A Woman in Flames
- 1985: The Perils of Gwendoline in the Land of the Yik-Yak
- 1985: Seduction: The Cruel Woman
- 1986: Blue Velvet
- 1986: From Beyond
- 1986: Tras el cristal
- 1986: 9½ Weeks
- 1987: Personal Services
- 1989: Wild Orchid
- 1990: Life Is Sweet by Mike Leigh
- 1990: Singapore Sling by Nikos Nikolaidis
- 1990: Tie Me Up! Tie Me Down!
- 1993: Tokyo Decadence
- 1993: Body of Evidence
- 1994: Exit to Eden
- 1994: Venus in Furs by Maartje Seyferth and Victor Nieuwenhuijs
- 1994: A New Love in Tokyo Original title: Ai no Shinsekai
- 1996: Bobby Sox (pornographic film)
- 1996: Breaking the Waves by Lars von Trier
- 1996: Fetishes
- 1997: Private Parts
- 1997: Preaching to the Perverted
- 1997: SICK: The Life & Death of Bob Flanagan, Supermasochist (interviews with the dying BDSM performance artist Bob Flanagan)
- 1999: Lies (South Korea)
- 1999: Romance by Catherine Breillat
- 1999: Tops & Bottoms: Sex, Power and Sadomasochism
- 1999: Wildly Available
- 1999: Moonlight Whispers (Original Japanese title: Gekko no Sasayaki)
- 2000: Quills (drama loosely based on the Marquis de Sade)
- 2000: Dirty Pictures (the movie is based on the Mapplethorpe exhibition in Cincinnati)
- 2001: The Piano Teacher
- 2001: Beyond Vanilla
- 2002: Raaz (Bollywood movie)
- 2002: Secretary
- 2002: The Fashionistas
- 2002: A Snake Of June
- 2003: Wir leben... SM!
- 2004: Going Under
- 2004: Bettie Page: Dark Angel
- 2005: Ecstasy in Berlin 1926 by Maria Beatty
- 2005: Mr. and Mrs. Smith
- 2005: The Notorious Bettie Page by Mary Harron
- 2005: The Zero Years by Nikos Nikolaidis
- 2006: 24/7 The Passion of Life
- 2006: Psychopathia Sexualis
- 2006: Hounded
- 2006: The Pet
- 2007: New Tokyo Decadence - The Slave
- 2007: Walk All Over Me
- 2008-2010: Legend of the Seeker
- 2009: Antichrist by Lars von Trier
- 2009: Modern Love Is Automatic
- 2009: SM-rechter (S&M Judge)
- 2010: Año bisiesto (Leap Year)
- 2013: KinK (a documentary, produced by James Franco about the BDSM website Kink.com)
- 2013: Nymphomaniac
- 2015: Fifty Shades of Grey
- 2019: Bonding (TV Series)
- 2019: Dogs Don't Wear Pants
- 2020: 365 Days
- 2022: Love and Leashes
- 2022: Sanctuary
- 2023: Saltburn
- 2024: Babygirl
- 2025: Pillion
- 2026: I Want Your Sex

Besides these mainstream movies, there is a huge market for underground sadomasochistic direct-to-DVD and Internet-download films. The majority of these have no explicit sexual content, but a few are also pornographic films. These videos fall into specific fetish categories such as bondage, corporal punishment (domestic and school spanking), pony play (animal role-playing) and dungeon-based BDSM centered on the master/slave dynamic. The porn industry has responded to this growing trend by creating a number of sex films with an S&M theme. The most noteworthy are the award-winning The Fashionistas (2002) and its 2003 sequel, The Fashionistas II.

In recent years, movies like 9½ Weeks (1986), Tokyo Decadence (1992), and Secretary (2002) have been shown, sometimes edited, on television in several countries. In 2001, the Canadian documentary KinK became the first television series on the topic worldwide.

Other examples of BDSM in television and film are:

- The 'Allo 'Allo! series 1 episode "The British 'ave Come (The Fallen Madonna)" (1984) and series 3 episode "Pretty Maids All in a Row" (1987) both deal with BDSM.
- Payback (1999), a film with Lucy Liu as Pearl, a dominatrix and hit woman for the Chinese mafia.
- The Law & Order SVU season 1 episode "Stocks and Bondage" (1999) about the death of a businesswoman who was into BDSM.
- CSI (2000–2015) had a recurring character, Lady Heather, a professional dominatrix.
- In Dancing at the Blue Iguana (2000), Jennifer Tilly is a part-time dominatrix-for-hire and exotic dancer in leather fetish outfits.
- Mercy (2000), cable-movie with Peta Wilson as a submissive member of a secret S&M society.
- Fast Sofa (2001); Jennifer Tilly plays a porn star who is bound and gagged with elaborate leather gear and whipped by her manager (Eric Roberts) for misbehaving.
- nip/tuck (2003–2010) had Tia Carrere in a recurring role as professional dominatrix Mistress DarkPain.
- In the television series Desperate Housewives (2004–2012) the character Bree Van De Kamp's husband Rex had an illicit affair with a woman who was able to please him sexually as a dominatrix.
- EuroTrip (2004) features Lucy Lawless as a German dominatrix in an Amsterdam fetish club.
- The CSI: NY season 1 episode "Hush" (2005) centers on a case that involves the BDSM community.
- In the 2005 episode "Love Hurts" of the TV series House, Dr. House treats a patient, Harvey Park (John Cho) who has a dominatrix, Annette Raines (Christina Cox).
- On the fourth season of the reality show VH1's The Surreal Life (2005) Jane Wiedlin from the pop group The Go-Gos dressed in dominatrix gear and revealed her secret BDSM lifestyle. In that episode, other cast members dabbled in S&M play in a makeshift dungeon room.
- Secret Diary of a Call Girl (2007), a British series about a call girl who takes dominatrix lessons in one episode.
- Seasons 3 and 4 of The History Channel series Vikings (2015, 2016–2017) depict French Count Odo (Owen Roe) practicing sadomasochism with Therese (Karen Hassan), the wife of another noble. He beats and tortures her with various implements for the purpose of sexual arousal.
- In the Showtime series Billions (2016), psychiatrist Wendy Rhoades (Maggie Siff) plays dominatrix to her husband, District Attorney Chuck (Paul Giamatti).
- Submission (2016), follows the journey of Ashley (Ashlynn Yennie) from being in an unhappy relationship to her exploration of BDSM when she stumbles upon an erotic novel called SLAVE by Nolan Keats.
- Season 2 of Marco Polo (2016) has the characters Ahmad and Mei Lin engage in rope bondage and pegging.
- Bonding, which premiered in 2019, is about a dominatrix and her assistant.
- Love and Leashes, 2022 Netflix film about romance between two office workers, one of whom has a unique sexual taste and preference for dominant women.

== Video games ==
Mighty Jill Off is a 2008 platformer game developed by Anna Anthropy. It follows Jill, a bottom with a boot fetish in a lesbian BDSM relationship, climbing a tower after being kicked off by her partner. The game received praise for its insight into BDSM and the dom/sub relationship. Rock, Paper, Shotgun's Kieron Gillen called it an "interesting examination of the master/slave relationship". Rock Paper Shotgun's Alec Meer described it as a "wry, subversive examination of why video game protagonists put themselves through a torturous amount of struggle to reach their objectives". James DeRosa praised Anthropy for her implementation of elements and ideas that most games do not cover and called it a "hypersexualized, bondage-themed platformer" with which Anthropy "explores the power dynamics of sexuality and disassembles essentialist male and female sex roles as portrayed in video games -- as well as the significance of difficulty and reward as a design method".

Another game by Anna Anthropy, Encyclopedia Fuckme and the Case of the Vanishing Entree, is a dating simulator featuring a submissive protagonist trying to escape from their partner, a dominant cannibal intending to tie up and eat the player.

== See also ==
- Leather subculture
- List of dominatrices in popular culture
- List of people associated with BDSM
- List of universities with BDSM clubs
- Sadism and masochism in fiction
- Sadism and Masochism
- Marquis de Sade in popular culture
- Sex and nudity in video games
- Sexual revolution
