= List of dominatrices in popular culture =

A dominatrix (plural dominatrices or dominatrixes) or mistress is a woman who takes the dominant role in bondage and discipline, dominance and submission or BDSM.

As fetish culture has become more prevalent in Western media, depictions of dominatrices in film and television have become more common.

== In film ==
Year	Country	Title	Notes
1962	United States	The Counterfeit Traitor	Ingrid Van Bergen is a leather-clad dominatrix/resistance fighter in WWII yarn.
1963	United States	The Balcony	Actress Ruby Dee plays out a dominatrix scene for a judge/client.
1964	United States	Olga's House of Shame, White Slaves of Chinatown, Olga's Girls	Trilogy of sexploitation films, all from 1964, with Audrey Campbell as Olga, sadistic mistress of a white slavery ring.
1967	United States	Venus in Furs	Sexploitation film directed by Joseph Marzano loosely based on the novella by Leopold von Sacher-Masoch.
1969	Italy	Venus in Furs	Based on the Sacher-Masoch story, directed by Massimo Dallamano. (Not to be confused with the Jess Franco horror film also from 1969.)
1969	United Kingdom	The Magic Christian	Raquel Welch makes a brief appearance as "Priestess of the whip".
1970	United States	Myra Breckinridge (film)	Raquel Welch plays a transgender female supremacist with an agenda in this widely panned sexploitation piece that includes an early (simulated) depiction of pegging in cinema.
1975	France	Histoire d'O (The Story of O)	The character of Anne-Marie, played by Christiane Minazzoli, is a lesbian dominatrix with a small harem of women.
1976	France	Maîtresse	Gérard Depardieu becomes involved with dominatrix Bulle Ogier.
1978	United States, United Kingdom	Revenge of the Pink Panther	Tanya The Lotus Eater (Valerie Leon), a catsuit-clad, whip-wielding dominatrix, chases Chief Inspector Jacques Clouseau (Peter Sellers) – who is dressed in women's clothing — through his apartment.
1982	United States	Eating Raoul	Housewife plays Doris the Dominatrix at a swingers' parties and coaches Mary Woronov's character.
1983	Germany	A Woman in Flames	Gudrun Landgrebe portrays a woman who becomes a dominatrix.
1983	United States	Working Girls	Filmmaker Lizze Borden's movie shows a day in life of a small Manhattan bordello, including a domination scene.
1985	Germany	Seduction: The Cruel Woman	Inspired by Venus in Furs, this is a study of a dominatrix who takes on both male and female slaves.
1986	UK	Sid and Nancy	Nancy works with a dominatrix
1987	UK	Personal Services	Lots of different scenes
1992	Japan	Tokyo Decadence	Miho Nikaido portrays a timid call girl who does a kinky session with a male client and female dominatrix.
1992	United States	Body of Evidence	Madonna portrays a dominatrix who seduces and sexually humiliates her lawyer.
1992	United States	Batman Returns	The character Catwoman who is played by Michelle Pfeiffer wears a skin-tight latex catsuit and wields a long whip.
1994	United States	Exit to Eden	Comedy with Dana Delany as the dominatrix co-founder of an S&M resort and Iman (model) as another prominent dominatrix at the resort.
1994	United States	Naked Gun 33 1/3: The Final Insult	A dominatrix, played by Julie Strain, works at the fertility clinic that Frank goes to.
1994	United Kingdom	Love and Human Remains	Mia Kirshner plays Benita, a psychic dominatrix.
1995	The Netherlands	Venus in Furs	Faithful adaptation of the Sacher-Masoch novella.
1995	United States	Batman Forever	The villain Two-Face has two gun molls named Sugar and Spice. Spice is a dominatrix who wears a black leather corset and represents his "bad" side, while Sugar wears a white laced corset and represents his "good" side. (But both girls are very evil.)
1996	United States	Fetishes	A documentary by Nick Broomfield filmed at New York City's Pandora's Box, an SM/fetish parlour.
1996	United States	Barb Wire (film)	Pamela Anderson plays a female bounty hunter and mercenary in post-apocalyptic America who during one scene poses as a prostitute clad in dominatrix attire in order to capture a wanted criminal. She also wears many revealing skin-tight leather outfits throughout the movie.
1997	United Kingdom	Preaching to the Perverted	Comedy with Guinevere Turner as the dominatrix owner of a notorious English S&M club.
1997	United States	Booty Call	A scene towards the end of the movie where Vivica A. Fox dresses up as a dominatrix and prepares to have sex with Jamie Foxx who is tied to a bed in a gimp outfit.
1998	United States	Bride of Chucky	Jennifer Tilly plays the girlfriend of the serial killer Chucky who is trapped inside a doll's body. During one scene she ties a man down to a bed in handcuffs and does a sexy dance for him in a dominatrix outfit so that she can lure Chucky into murdering him.
1999	United States	Body Shots	Emily Procter plays a dominatrix who binds and paddles Ron Livingston.
1999	United States	Payback	Lucy Liu portrays a sadistic dominatrix who is the leader of a gang of Chinese Triads.
1999	United States	The General's Daughter	Leslie Stefanson's character is shown on a tape watched by John Travolta's character as having acted the role of a dominatrix with a male partner
2000	United States	Dancing at the Blue Iguana	Jennifer Tilly plays a stripper in S&M outfits and part-time dominatrix seen in an extensive scene bullying a male client.
2000	United States	Charlie's Angels	Lucy Liu plays a Charlie's Angels member who goes undercover as an office supervisor with a dominatrix personality.
2001	United States	Tomcats	Heather Stephens plays an "innocent librarian" who turns out to be a lifestyle dominatrix. She then proceeds to torture Michael, played by Jerry O'Connell.
2002	United States	The Fashionistas	Award-winning pornographic film from Evil Angel that explores the world of fetish fashion, BDSM, and kinky sex.
2003	United States	American Wedding	During a bachelor party there is a scene involving two strippers: one dressed like a dominatrix police woman and the other dressed like a French maid.
2004	United States	Bettie Page: Dark Angel	Biopic that recreates many of her sub/dom fetish films for Irving Klaw.
2004	United States	Dodgeball: A True Underdog Story	Due to a mix-up with the uniforms they ordered, a dodgeball team shows up to a match wearing S&M outfits. Christine Taylor's character is dressed as a dominatrix.
2004	United Kingdom	The Dominatrix	Drama about the life of a career Dom.
2004	United States	EuroTrip	Comedy with Lucy Lawless as a German dominatrix in an Amsterdam S&M club.
2004	United States	Going Under	Drama about the relationship between a married man and a partnered dominatrix.
2005	United States	Reefer Madness	Kristen Bell is seen as a dominatrix while singing "Little Mary Sunshine".
2005	United States	Mr. & Mrs. Smith	Angelina Jolie's character poses as a dominatrix to assassinate a target.
2005	United States	Bettie Page: Bondage Queen	Cult Epics DVD compilation of Irving Klaw's 1950s BDSM fetish films featuring Bettie Page as both dominatrix and damsel-in-distress.
2006	United States	Shortbus	Comedy-drama featuring the professional dominatrix Severin, played by Lindsay Beamish, who wants to help Sofia to loosen up sexually so that she can have her first orgasm.
2006	Germany	Hounded (de:Verfolgt (2006))	A middle-aged female probation officer enters a dominant relationship with one of the young male delinquents she works with.
2007	Canada	Walk All Over Me	Comedy-drama with Tricia Helfer as a professional dominatrix.
2007	Japan	New Tokyo Decadence - The Slave	Dominatrix turned secretary is blackmailed into being an S&M slave by her boss.
2009	United States	Modern Love is Automatic	A bored nurse moonlights as a dominatrix for hire.
2009	United States	Brüno	A homosexual Austrian fashion reporter has an experience with a dominatrix.
2009	United States	Frat Party	A frat party, has an extended scene in the frat house "dungeon" with a dominatrix.
2009	United States	My Normal	The story of Natalie, a young lesbian, who's struggling to find a balance between her dreams of becoming a film maker and her lifestyle as a dominatrix.
2012	United States	American Reunion	Michelle dresses up as a dominatrix and makes her husband Jim dress up as a gimp so that they can have "romantic" sex.
2012	France	After Fall, Winter	Michael is having a mid-life crisis, with his writing career in tatters. He leaves New York for Paris, hoping to reinvigorate his writing. He meets a nurse with a secret; she also works as a professional dominatrix.
2013	France	Venus in Fur	Vanda Jordan arrives at an audition for a play with the director though her name does not appear on the audition list. As the audition moves forward Vanda accuses him of having masochistic desirs though he denies it. By the end of the movie he becomes her slave.
2013	Japan	R100	Ordinary businessman Takafumi Katayama signs a contract to join a mysterious BDSM club where various dominatrices, each with their own specialty skill, will attack and humiliate him in public. The contract lasts for one year and no cancellation is allowed.
2014	Australia	My Mistress	A teenage boy struck by a family tragedy sparks a relationship with a French middle aged professional dominatrix.
2019	Finland	Dogs Don't Wear Pants	Mona (Krista Kosonen) is a professional dominatrix who introduces Juha (Pekka Strang) to the world of BDSM. He becomes obsessed with her and wants to use BDSM sessions as a therapeutic method to overcome his wife's death.

== In television ==
Year	Season	Show	Episode(s)	Notes
1977	Two	Space 1999	Devil's Planet	John Koenig (Martin Landau) winds up on a prison planet where all the prisoners are male, and the prison is run by whip-wielding, pony-tailed females wearing red-orange cat suits, matching knee-high boots, and gold-colored gorgets with matching gladiator helmets.
1981	Four	WKRP in Cincinnati	"Jennifer and the Will"	Newscaster Les Nessman hears that receptionist Jennifer Marlowe (Loni Anderson) has been appointed as an executrix, and advertising executive Herb Tarlek tells him this job involves "high heels and a whole lot of leather."
1992-2005	Several	The Powerpuff Girls	"Mommy Fearest" (first appearance) and many recurring appearances	Sedusa is a villain on the series who wears a red leotard, black leggings with red fishnets, red thigh-high high-heeled boots, and red opera gloves. She also can use her hair as a whip.
1993	VI	Red Dwarf	Psirens	Samantha Robson is dressed as a dominatrix to play an alien disguised as Pete Tranter's sister, a teenager Lister lusted after during his adolescence.
1997	Two	Just Shoot Me!	La Cage	A supermodel played by Stephanie Romanov enjoys luring men back to her place where she locks them in a cage.
1998–1999	Three	Buffy the Vampire Slayer	The Wish and Doppelgangland	The alternate universes "Vampire Willow" is shown as a dominatrix like character, who tortures the character Angel in an overtly sexual way akin to BDSM. When Vampire Willow is later described to the real Willow by Buffy, she says "It was exactly you, Will, every detail. Except for your not being a dominatrix... as far as we know."
2000	Two	Family Guy	Let's Go to the Hop	Gag depicts main characters Lois and Peter suiting up for a sadomasochistic session (Lois as a dominatrix) while carrying on a conversation about how to protect their children from the new "Toad" drug craze. The scene ends with Lois telling Peter the safeword for the session and Peter telling her he loves her and the session commences (and the scene ends).
2000	One	Jack of All Trades	X Marquis the Spot	Angela Dotchin pretends to be a dominatrix at the S&M island resort of the Marquis de Sade.
2003	Two	Alias	Second Double	Jennifer Garner as Sydney Bristow goes undercover as a German dominatrix in a Berlin leather bar.
2004–2005	One	Desperate Housewives	Come Back to Me	In one scene, Sharon Lawrence plays a dominatrix who walks across Rex Van de Kamp's back in stiletto heels
2005	Three	NCIS	Kill Ari (Part 1)	In the aftermath of agent Kate Todd's (Sasha Alexander) death, McGee (Sean Murray) remembers her initially as Trinity from The Matrix, then as a dominatrix.
2005	One	House M.D.	Love Hurts	A 21-year-old male was diagnosed with an aneurysm. Chase reveals that the woman visiting the patient is a dominatrix after finding her choking him during a visit.
2001–2011	Several	CSI: Crime Scene Investigation	Slaves of Las Vegas, Lady Heather's Box, Pirates of the Third Reich, The Good, the Bad, and the Dominatrix, Leave Out All the Rest, Unleashed	Several stories with BDSM themes plus six episodes featuring Melinda Clarke as Lady Heather, a dominatrix who owns a fetish club.
2007	Nine	Holby City	The Q Word	A PVC clad dominatrix brings a client to Holby City Hospital with a stiletto heel puncturing his chest.
2007	One	Secret Diary of a Call Girl	1.4 (no title)	In the 4th episode, "Belle" (Billie Piper) takes BDSM lessons from a professional dominatrix to please a submissive client.
2008	Two	Private Practice	Past Tense	KaDee Strickland is seen roleplaying as a German dominatrix in a latex outfit with studded collar and whip.
2008-2009	One and Two	Legend of the Seeker	"Denna" (first appearance) and many recurring appearances	The Mord-Sith are a group of dominatrixes with magical powers, who work for evil monarch Darken Rahl. Numerous members of this group appear throughout the series. Jessica Marais and Tabrett Bethell play the most frequently appearing Mord-Sith members.
2009	One	Dollhouse	Spy in the House of Love	Echo (Eliza Dushku), is seen as a leather-clad whip-wielding dominatrix.
2009	Two	1000 Ways to Die	Domin-a-Dead (a.k.a. Rubbered Out)	Episode where dominatrix gags a guy with a severe allergy to rubber latex
2009	Five	Rescue Me	Initiation	Callie Thorne's character seduces Tommy (Denis Leary) dressed as a cheerleader, Playboy bunny and latex-clad dominatrix. They are seen briefly paddling each other in a fast-motion sequence.
2009	Two	Castle	The Mistress Always Spanks Twice	The body of a woman covered in caramel sauce is found hanging from playground equipment in a park, prompting the team to venture into the world of bondage and fetish clubs.
2012	Two	Sherlock	A Scandal in Belgravia	Irene Adler is a professional dominatrix, played by Lara Pulver.
2013	Survivor: Caramoan	Survivor		Phillip Sheppard assigns Corinne Kaplan with the codename "Dominatrix"
2015	One	Gotham	The Scarecrow	"Edge Play" author Jane Boon dons boots and thigh high stockings to play a dominatrix in the episode.
2016	Several	Billions		Maggie Siff plays the role of Wendy Rhoades, a psychiatrist at the fictional firm Axe Capital and dominatrix mistress of her husband, Chuck Rhoades.
2016	Three	Gotham	Time Bomb	Barbara (Erin Richards) traps a shopkeeper in stocks and strikes him with a riding crop until he reveals the combination to his safe.
2017	Three	iZombie	Spanking the Zombie	Zombie detective Liv (Rose McIver) eats the brain of a murdered dominatrix in order to see visions that will help her locate the killer. Eating the brain also causes her to inherit the dominatrix's personality.
2019	Several	Bonding	All episodes	The main character, Tiff Chester (Zoe Levin), is a psychology student moonlighting as a dominatrix.

== In gaming ==
1991	Japan	Streets of Rage	A whip-wielding dominatrix named Nora serves as the game's only common female enemy. She attacks the player with her whip.
1991	Great Britain	Battletoads	The primary villain of the franchise is the Dark Queen, a sexy, voluptuous woman wearing a dominatrix-style leotard and cape.
1993	Japan	Streets of Rage 2	Another dominatrix named Electra replaces Nora as the common female enemy. She wields an electric whip.
1994	Japan	Streets of Rage 3	Electra returns once again as one of the common female enemies.
1995	Japan	Battle Arena Toshinden	The character Sofia wears skin-tight black latex clothing, and uses a whip as her weapon. Pre-launch advertising for the Sony PlayStation played up Sofia's dominatrix aspect.
1997	Japan	Castlevania: Symphony of the Night	One of the boss enemies, known as The Succubus, dresses in dominatrix attire. She is also a very cruel and sadistic demon who tortures the main character Alucard psychologically by disguising herself as his dead mother, Lisa.
1998	Japan	Soul series of video games	Playable character Ivy Valentine is based on the concept, given her sexy, skimpy outfits, whip like weapon, and her dialogue that strongly suggests she "punishes" her opponents while fighting them.
2001	Japan	Ace Attorney series	Prosecutor Franziska von Karma, daughter of Manifred von Karma, the main antagonist in the original game. Her outfit consists of a tight blouse with leather gloves, fishnet stockings, and stiletto heels, and carries a whip or riding crop that she uses as both a tool of intimidation and affection.
2001	United States	Cel Damage	One of the playable characters is named Dominique Trix, a play-on-words of "dominatrix". She wears a skimpy black top, a short black skirt that accents her buttocks, and long black gloves and boots. On the box art and menus, she is depicted as wielding a whip, and choosing her from the character select screen plays the sound of a whip crack. Her dialogue includes lines such as, "I am the queen of pain," "That's why I'm on top," and, "You'd look good in handcuffs."
2003	Japan	Castlevania: Lament of Innocence	A different Succubus (who is also dressed in dominatrix attire) appears as one of the boss enemies in this game. She attempts to trick the main character Leon Belmont by disguising as his fiancé, but when he does not fall for her trick she reveals her true form and fights him. She too is a sadistic demon who believes that Leon will look even more handsome with his "face warped in pain".
2001	Japan	Dead or Alive series	The character Christie is a dominatrix.
2003	United States	True Crime: Streets of LA	A Russian mob boss named Rocky owns a private S&M club where dominatrixes perform services for male clientele. While infiltrating the club it is necessary to fight the women who work there and their clients, who are all dressed in black S&M attire.
2004	Japan	Silent Hill 4: The Room	Though maybe not intentionally a dominatrix, the character Eileen Galvin can be given a riding crop found later in the game as a weapon to defend herself from monsters. She also has a very revealing nurse costume that can be unlocked.
2004	Japan	Fatal Frame II: Crimson Butterfly (known as Zero: Akai Chou in Japan)	Twin sisters Mio and Mayu Amakura both have an unlockable "Bondage" costume. Mio's outfit is black leather while Mayu's outfit is red leather.
2004	United States	Rumble Roses	Mistress Spencer is a playable character as a Dominatrix.
2004	United States	World of Warcraft	Succubi are demons who dress in dominatrix attire and use whips to attack the player.
2005	Japan	Haunting Ground (known as Demento in Japan)	The game's heroine Fiona Belli gets a variety of unlockable outfits, one of them being a very revealing dominatrix costume that comes with a whip that can be used as a weapon.
2007	Japan	Castlevania: The Dracula X Chronicles	The fiancé of the main character Richter Belmont becomes a dominatrix-clad vampire if he fails to rescue her. She also bears a strong resemblance to the succubi from other Castlevania video games.
2007	UK	Heavenly Sword	One of King Bohan's generals is a dominatrix named Whiptail who is also his mistress. She attacks using a long whip.
2008	United States	Fallout 3	Some of the Raiders wear outfits that are called "Raider Sadist Armor", which looks like a dominatrix outfit. A disturbing feature of the outfit is the two severed hands hanging from the belt.
2008	United States	Brütal Legend	The "Tainted Coil" faction has a lot of references to the BDSM world and dominatrixes, especially the troops called "Punishing Party".
2009	Japan	Resident Evil 5 (known as Biohazard 5 in Japan)	One of the villains in the game named Excella Gionne, who is also a playable character in the mini game The Mercenaries Reunion, behaves very much like a dominatrix. Although She doesn't wear typical dominatrix attire her melee attacks consist of many slaps and heel stomps and she speaks in a very sexually demeaning way while using voice commands or taunts. Her behavior indicates that she gets sadistic pleasure out of killing enemies.
2009	Japan	Bayonetta	The black-suited heroine is based on the concept, using "Punish attacks" that include spanking. The weapon Kulshedra (and Jeanne's equivalent, Vritra) is a whip that resembles a python. The "Umbran Elegance" (costume) that can be worn when using said weapon gives Bayonetta or Jeanne a dominatrix mask, and long gloves and boots.
2010	United States	Fallout: New Vegas	This game features many prostitutes, some of which appear to be dominatrixes.
2011	UK	Batman: Arkham City	The character Catwoman is a dominatrix supervillain who wields a long whip.
2012	Japan	Hyperdimension Neptunia series	One of the main characters, Plutia, is a sadistic, scantily-clad dominatrix wielding a whip sword when in her goddess form Iris Heart.
2013	Japan	The Wonderful 101	Wonder-Pink uses a whip as her weapon, and some of her dialogue is rather suggestive, such as, "Bad boy!" and, "Time for a little punishment!"
2014	Japan	Ultra Street Fighter IV	Originally from the Final Fight franchise, the character Poison is a dominatrix fighter who uses a short whip and handcuffs to fight her opponent.
2015	Japan	Yakuza 0	In Chapter 2, "The Real Estate Broker in the Shadows", Kazuma Kiryu can begin the "How to Train Your Dominatrix" substory. In this substory Kiryu helps a dominatrix named "Ayu" learn to be a better dominatrix.

== In advertisement ==
theTVBoss.org	One of the TV Commercials advertising for the V chip to protect children from inappropriate programs features a dominatrix named Mistress Mandy who is standing in a living room with a married couple. The couple explain to her that while they do enjoy her show, they are going to block her so that their children won't see it.
Wonderful Pistachios	One of the television commercials in the "Wonderful Pistachios – Get Crackin" series features a dominatrix who cracks open a pistachio using a whip; the commercial generated some complaints and controversy. The dominatrix was portrayed by real-life professional dominatrix, Mistress Isabella Sinclaire.
Mini Dominates Winter	Mini Canada used an interactive website featuring a PVC-clad Dominatrix teasing, whipping, slapping, and buffing a Mini Cooper to show off the features that give Mini total control over icy winter conditions.

== In comic books and manga ==
Year	Country	Series	Notes
1980	United States	X-Men	Emma Frost was a dominatrix while a villain, and continues to dress as one after reforming.
1986	United States	Batman: Year One	In a retelling of Batman's origins, Selina Kyle (alias Catwoman) appears as a dominatrix in a slum neighborhood of Gotham City. As some fans and authors took objection to this depiction, conflating it with prostitution, future Batman writers explained the situation as an undercover operation to further her "true" career of cat-burglar by targeting rich patrons.
2008	United States	Secret Six	Jeannette, once the "favorite" servant of sadistic serial killer Countess Elizabeth Báthory, and intended to be her final victim, she is now a banshee and assassin with similar methods. She tortures victims to death using dominatrix methods.
2008	United States	X-Men: Legacy	Miss Sinister (a clone of the villainous Mr. Sinister) dresses like one.
2009	Japan	One Piece	Sadi-Chan, the sadistic leader of the demon guardians in the World Government's horrid prison Impel Down is based on the concept, having a sexy devil-themed outfit and using typical dominatrix methods on inmates -- often lethally.
2011	Japan	Prison School	Meiko Shiraki, the antagonist's main enforcer, is based on the concept, a sadist and exhibitionist who uses such methods to punish students.
2017	Japan	My Hero Academia	Nemuri Kayama, aka Midnight, a pro-heroine and emcee of the U.A. Sports Festival; her skintight, suggestive outfit includes a dominatrix mask, handcuffs on her wrists, thigh-high stockings, black knee boots, and a whip. Her previous costume was even more risque, resulting in the authorities passing the "Hero Costume Skin Exposure Limitation Act", which outlawed such outfits.
2019	Japan	Gushing over Magical Girls	The protagonist Utena Hiiragi transforms into Magia Baiser, a villainess who enjoys torturing magical girls.

== See also ==
- BDSM in culture and media
