= Venus in Furs (disambiguation) =

Venus in Furs is an 1870 novella by Leopold von Sacher-Masoch.

In music, Venus in Furs may refer to:

- "Venus in Furs" (song), by the Velvet Underground
- A song by Electric Wizard, from the album Black Masses
- The Venus in Furs, a fictional band created for the 1998 movie Velvet Goldmine

On screen and stage, Venus in Furs may refer to:

- Venus in Furs (1967 film), directed by Joseph Marzano
- Venus in Furs (1969 Franco film), directed by Jesús Franco
- Venus in Furs (1969 Dallamano film), directed by Massimo Dallamano
- Seduction: The Cruel Woman, 1985 West German film directed by Elfi Mikesch and Monika Treut
- Venus in Furs (1995 film), directed by Victor Nieuwenhuijs and Maartje Seyferth
- Venus in Fur, two-character play by David Ives first produced in 2010
- Venus in Fur (film), 2013 French adaptation of the Ives play, directed by Roman Polanski
