= Leopold von Sacher-Masoch bibliography =

The bibliography of the Austrian author Leopold von Sacher-Masoch (1836—1895) includes a complete, exhaustive list of original books published during the author's lifetime.

== List ==
1857

- Der Aufstand in Gent unter Kaiser Carl V. Schaffhausen: Fr. Hurter, 1857

1858

- Eine galizische Geschichte 1846., 1858 [= Graf Donski. Eine galizische Geschichte. Schaffhausen, 1864; 2. Aufl.]

1862

- Ungarns Untergang und Maria von Österreich. Leipzig: Weigel, 1862

1863

- Der Emissär. Eine galizische Geschichte. Prag: Credner, 1863
- Polnische Revolutionen. Erinnerungen aus Galizien. 1863

1864

- Die Verse Friedrichs des Grossen. Schaffhausen: Fr. Hurter, 1864

1865

- Kaunitz. Kulturhistorischer Roman. 1865 [neue Ausgabe = Bern: Georg Frobeen, 1877]

1867

- Der letzte König der Magyaren. Historischer Roman. Jena, 1867

1870

- Die geschiedene Frau. Passionsgeschichte eines Idealisten. Leipzig, 1870 (2 Bde)
- Das Vermächtnis Kains: I. Die Liebe. Stuttgart: Kotta(?), 1870 (2 Bde)

1872

- Zur Ehre Gottes! Leipzig: Adolph Schumann, 1872 (Berlin: Neufeld & Henius?)

1873

- Falscher Hermelin. 1873 (1873-79?)
- Ein weiblicher Sultan. Historischer Roman. (Berlin: Paul Franke ???) 1873
- Die Messalinen Wiens. Geschichten aus der guten Gesellschaft. 1873 (1874?)
- Über den Wert der Kritik. Erfahrungen und Bemerkungen. Leipzig: E.J. Günther, 1873
- (?)Soziale Schattenbilder: Aus den Memoiren eines österreichischen Polizeibeamten. Halle: Gesenius, 1873
- Gute Menschen und ihre Geschichten. Leipzig: Poketer, 1873 (?)

1873-1874

- Russische Hofgeschichten. (4 Bde)

1873-1877

- Wiener Hofgeschichten. (2 Bde)

1874

- Die Asthetik des Hässlichen. 1874

1875

- Die Ideale unserer Zeit. Roman 4 Bde. Bern, 1875 (1876?)
- Galizische Geschichten.* Leipzig: E.J. Günther, 1875 [2 Aufl.(?) = Bern: G. Frobeen & Cie, 1877]

1877

- Der Mann ohne Vorurteil. Zurich: Georg Frobeen, 1877
- Das Vermächtnis Kains: II. Das Eigentum. Bern: Georg Frobeen, 1877 (2 Bde)

1878

- Der neue Hiob. Stuttgart, 1878
- Judengeschichten. Leipzig: Harthock, 1878
- Die Republik der Weiberfeinde. Leipzig, 1878

1879

- Silhouetten. Leipzig: Schulze, 1879 ???

1881

- Neue Judengeschichten. 1881

1883

- Die Gottesmutter. Leipzig, 1883

1885

- (?)Mein Freund Wodakoski. Prag, 1885

1886

- Die Seelenfängerin. 1886
- Ewige Jugend. 1886
- Polnische Ghetto-Geschichten. München, 1886
- Kleine Mysterien der Weltgeschichte. Leipzig–Reudnitz: Oswald Schmidt, 1886 [2. Auflage]

1887

- Polnische Geschichten. Breslau: Schottländer, 1887

1890

- Die Schlange im Paradies. Russischer Sittenroman in 3 Bänden. Mannheim: J. Bensheim, 1890 (3 Bde)

1891

- Die Einsamen. Mannheim: J. Bensheimer, 1891

1892

- Jüdische Leben in Wort und Bild. Mannheim: J. Bensheimer, 1892

1893

- Bühnenzauber. 1893

1894

- Liebesgeschichten. Berlin: Neufeld & Henius, 1894
- Die Satten und die Hungrigen. Berlin: Schreiter, 1894

=== Posthumous editions ===
1898

- Entre nous. Berlin–Leipzig: Hillger, 1898

1900

- Katherina II. Berlin: Th. Knaur/Schreiter, 1900 (?)

1901

- Afrikas Semiramis. Hg. C.F. von Schlichtegroll. Dresden, 1901
- Grausame Frauen. Hinterlassene Novellen. Bd. I. Dresden, 1901
