= Sacher =

Sacher is a surname. Origins can be traced back to Germany. Notable people with the surname include:

- Anna Sacher, Austrian hotel owner and proprietor
  - Das Sacher, Austrian-German historical drama television series, story of Anna Sacher
- Franz Sacher, Austrian baker
  - Hotel Sacher, a five-star hotel in Vienna
- Harry Sacher, British Zionist and lawyer
  - Sacher Park, public park in Jerusalem
- Harry Sacher (lawyer), American attorney
- John Sacher, British retailer
- Lara Sacher, Australian actress
- Maja Sacher, Swiss art collector and philanthropist, wife of Paul Sacher
- Michael Sacher, German politician
- Michael M. Sacher, British businessman, son of Zionist Harry Sacher
- Paul Sacher, Swiss conductor, patron and impresario
- Richard Sacher, Czech politician and civil servant
- Sarolta Zalatnay (born Charlotte Sacher, 1947), Hungarian singer

== See also ==
- Leopold von Sacher-Masoch, Austrian writer and journalist
  - Eva von Sacher-Masoch, great-niece of him
  - Wanda von Sacher-Masoch, wife of him
