= Salcher =

Salcher is a German surname. Notable people with the surname include:

- Andreas Salcher (born 1960), Austrian politician, consultant, and author
- Markus Salcher (born 1991), Austrian alpine skier
- Peter Salcher (1848–1928), Austrian and Croatian physicist

== See also ==
- Sacher
