= Mighty Jill Off =

2008 video game

- Title screen for Mighty Jill Off
- Developer: Anna Anthropy
- Designer: Anna Anthropy
- Artist: James Harvey
- Composer: Andrew Toups
- Platforms: Windows, Mac OS X
- Release: February 29, 2008
- Genre: Platformer
- Mode: Single-player

Mighty Jill Off is a 2008 independently developed freeware platform video game designed by Anna Anthropy, with art by James Harvey and music by Andrew Toups. It stars a submissive named Jill, who has a boot fetish and is forced to climb up a tower after her Queen kicks her down it as punishment. Jill does this by jumping and slowly descending over obstacles. Jill can be defeated in one hit by these obstacles, but will return to the last check point. The game serves as an homage to the 1984 arcade game Bomb Jack and its console and computer sequel, Mighty Bomb Jack. It had follow-ups, such as Mighty Jill Off - Jill Off Harder Edition and Jill Off With One Hand. Jill made a cameo appearance in the 2010 video game Super Meat Boy as a playable character.

The game's BDSM and lesbian themes were implemented by Anthropy, a BDSM practitioner, for the purpose of providing legitimate "dykes" in video games. She also made the game difficult, to fit in with its BDSM theme. James Harvey attempted to make this game appealing for the BDSM community. Mighty Jill Off has received praise for its BDSM themes from critics of websites such as Rock, Paper, Shotgun and Game Set Watch. It was also praised for its high level of difficulty by editors of GamesRadar and Bitmob. 1UP.com included it in its list of favourite free PC games of 2009.

== Gameplay and scenario ==
In Mighty Jill Off, Jill can be defeated in one hit by several obstacles, including spikes as shown here. She is able to slow her descent mid-air to hover over spikes, which allows her to get through tight, spiked passageways.

Mighty Jill Off incorporates several BDSM themes. It stars a submissive lesbian named Jill who has a boot fetish. She is kicked to the bottom of her Queen's tower for acting like a "greedy slut". Jill attempts to climb back up the tower and return to her Queen; once there, she is given affection, constricted and gagged, and made to do it again.

Some of Mighty Jill Off's gameplay is borrowed from the 1986 arcade game Mighty Bomb Jack as a tribute. Players control Jill in only three ways: moving, jumping, and slowly descending. In the air, players may cause Jill to slowly descend by rapidly pushing the jump button while pointing in the direction that they want her to go. Players can switch direction while they do this. There are three types of obstacles: spikes, fire, and spiders; the latter can move to attack Jill when she comes close. Coming into contact with these obstacles kills Jill instantly, forcing her to start at the most recent checkpoint—typically located at a change in room. There is only one level in the game, but with several rooms in it. The screen scrolls vertically with Jill as she ascends up the tower. Each room transition is demonstrated by a change in the room's background colour. Jill has infinite lives, allowing players to play as long as they like without having to start the game over.

== Development ==
Mighty Jill Off was designed and developed by American video game designer and critic Anna Anthropy, also known as Auntie Pixelante, in 2008. James Harvey provided the artwork for the game, while Andrew Toups created the music. Anthropy designed Mighty Jill Off to feature "dykes and perverts" to make up for "the distinct lack of real dyke characters and dyke desire in games". She argued that while "supposed dykes" are seen in commercials, these characters are "written and drawn by men". She said that "they don't look like us, they don't express themselves like us, they don't lust like us." Anthropy compared the challenge of players who lead Jill through the game as similar to the challenges of a top who leads the bottom through a scene.

=== Art design ===
Concept art for Jill, drawn by James Harvey, showing the multiple concepts for Jill that he created before deciding on the final one.

While the character artwork for Mighty Jill Off was created by James Harvey, Anthropy first designed Jill in sprite form. Harvey was initially wary of doing work that was BDSM-themed; he felt that it was easy for something that is both cartoony and sexual to make viewers feel uncomfortable and used the Japanese harem anime genre as an example. He added that in humorous, sexually oriented cartoons, there is a "fine line" between "cute and funny" and "repulsive". He wanted to design the relationship between the Queen and Jill in a way that people in the BDSM community could identify with it, while also avoiding putting people off who were not into BDSM. He used European comics as a model for his art work, which he admired for the "permissive attitude they have to sex in cartoons". He also cited as inspiration specific Japanese cartoonists who he felt had successfully portrayed sex in animation such as Monkey Punch, the creator of Lupin III.

Harvey designed the Queen based on a loose description by Anthropy. He wanted to make her "sexy and authoritative" and to look like a "fully grown human with relatively realistic proportions". He designed her to be an "amalgamation of every lesbian friend" he had "secretly been attracted to". He initially designed her with a veil, but felt that this was too superfluous and girly; he decided to adorn her with spikes instead. He attempted to design the title screen's background to "emphasise the drama of [the] situation, or to expressionistically [sic] symbolise the characters in the scene". However, there were some hurdles; he originally envisioned the Queen's tower to be a smooth, straight one, but felt that it would be too phallic, which would be meaningless symbolism given the game's content. Anthropy and Harvey held a contest for people to contribute fan art for the game; the five winners won hand-made Mighty Jill Off activity books, which included activities such as creating make-out partners for a group of "repulsive, tongue-waggling oafs", as well as writing a poem for the game's Queen. He scanned one of the books and posted it online, allowing others to contribute and send in their drawings. The book features several BDSM-related themes.

Harvey was split between two designs for Jill. He either wanted to depict her as a "funny little megaman character" or a grown woman; however, both approaches had their own pitfalls. He felt that the former could come off as too much like Japanese lolicon-styled art, while the latter could make the story seem too serious. The Queen's more realistic design made him question whether a child-like Jill would be appropriate. He designed several versions of Jill with different proportions and sent them to Anthropy so she could pick her favourite. He compared two of the designs to Nintendo characters Mario and Link; the Mario-like design he called a "standard video game design", while the Link-like design he called "slightly realistic". The Link-like design was the most realistic design that he did because he felt that making it too realistic could make it too difficult for players to identify with, and could diminish the humorous elements of the game. He also intended to design her as "dumpy and podgy" to make her more "lovable".

Anthropy told Harvey that she preferred characters with more realistic proportions; as a result, he ended up with a design that was three and a half heads tall. Due to her submissive position, he designed her to be an "innocent" who looked "eager-to-please", with "benign, wide eyed facial expressions". The evolution of her design resulted in Harvey having to redesign her appearance on the title screen. He employed different colors to demonstrate Jill's feelings for the Queen; he used a rose tint to demonstrate her "blissful display of affection" while using a grey wash to demonstrate her sadness. Harvey intended to add some red to her rubber body suit order to make her stand out from the background; however, he felt that this made the suit look more like a "crazy wrestler costume". He later thought to include grey in the design or to put her initials on her chest, but decided on using an all black design. One of the difficulties of designing the suit was to make it look shiny without resembling "gross lolicon manga porn".

=== Follow-ups ===
An expanded version called Mighty Jill Off - Jill Off Harder Edition, was released in October 2008, 8 months after the original version. Upon clearing the original level in under 12 minutes, a second significantly more challenging level automatically begins. Clearing this level shows Jill being gagged and bound to a large X-cross and being whipped once for each minute she took to reach the top again. Anthropy compared it to the Nintendo game Super Mario Bros.: The Lost Levels which was noticeably more difficult than its predecessor, Super Mario Bros. She made it with the intention of reusing assets from the original game such as sprites and backgrounds but making sure that none of the challenges were recycled. She also made a follow-up called Jill Off with One Hand, which features "OneSwitch" gameplay, a type of gameplay which requires only one button to play. It was created over the course of Buy Nothing Day and was created with the intent of making it playable on mobile phones. The protagonist Jill was featured in the 2010 platform game Super Meat Boy along with several characters from other games.

== Reception and promotion ==
Mighty Jill Off has received generally positive reception. Retronauts' Jess Ragan praised Anthropy for her understanding of what made Mighty Bomb Jack good. 1UP.com's Scott Sharkey listed Mighty Jill Off as one of his favourite independently developed freeware games in 2009. Gamasutra listed it as one of their runners-up for the top five best indie games of 2008. On two separate occasions, IndieGames' Tim W. listed Mighty Jill Off as "game picks"; first for the original version, and second for Mighty Jill Off - Jill Off Harder Edition. GamesRadar's Nathan Meuiner listed the game as one of the "most ruthlessly punishing indie games" and wrote that the difficulty level may make players question whether the "pain of a million deaths is worth the pleasure awaiting" players. Bitmob's James DeRosa called it "tough-as-s***" and gave credit to Anthropy for coining the genre "masocore".

The game has also received praise for its insight into BDSM and the dom/sub relationship. Rock, Paper, Shotgun's Kieron Gillen called it an "interesting examination of the master/slave relationship". Rock Paper Shotgun's Alec Meer described it as a "wry, subversive examination of why video game protagonists put themselves through a torturous amount of struggle to reach their objectives". James DeRosa praised Anthropy for her implementation of elements and ideas that most games do not cover and called it a "hypersexualized, bondage-themed platformer" with which Anthropy "explores the power dynamics of sexuality and disassembles essentialist male and female sex roles as portrayed in video games -- as well as the significance of difficulty and reward as a design method".

== See also ==
- BDSM in culture and media
