= Queers in Love at the End of the World =

2013 video game

- Designer: Anna Anthropy
- Writer: Anna Anthropy
- Engine: Twine
- Platforms: Web browser; OS X; Windows
- Release: 2013
- Genres: Interactive fiction; Electronic literature

Queers in Love at the End of the World is a hypertext game by Anna Anthropy created with Twine. Developed for a 2013 game jam, Queers in Love at the End of the World asks its player to choose how to interact with their partner in the last ten seconds before the world ends.

== Gameplay ==
Each playthrough of Queers in Love at the End of the World is ten seconds long. A timer counts down from ten, and when it hits zero, the game ends. For those ten seconds, the player reads short narrative paragraphs and makes choices by selecting highlighted text, with each choice leading to a new outcome and more branching choices.

== Plot ==
The player character interacts with their lover in the last ten seconds before the end of the world. The outcome is always the same: the world ends.

== Development ==
Anna Anthropy built Queers in Love at the End of the World in Twine in 2013 for Ludum Dare, a game jam.

== Reception ==
Scholar Claudia Lo praised the game's embrace of queer temporality, as described in José Esteban Muñoz's Cruising Utopia. At The Guardian, Cara Ellison stated that Queers "evokes an itinerant life better than any other game".

The game was included in a 2018 exhibition at the Victoria and Albert Museum entitled "Videogames: Design/Play/Disrupt".
