= Encyclopedia Fuckme and the Case of the Vanishing Entree =

2011 video game

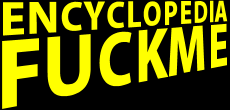
- Developer(s): Anna Anthropy
- Designer(s): Anna Anthropy
- Platform(s): Browser
- Release: 2011
- Genre(s): Dating sim
- Mode(s): Single-player

Encyclopedia Fuckme and the Case of the Vanishing Entree, later rereleased under the name Fuck Eat Kill, is a freeware dating sim developed and written by Anna Anthropy. The game stars a submissive who eagerly goes to Anni, her dominant partner, only to find that Anni plans on eating her for dinner in her house. The player is forced to make branching choices which affect the game's outcome.

Anthropy was inspired by her real-life submissive partner to create a dating sim that reflected real carnal desires instead of a more standard dating sim, which she perceived to be somewhat exploitative and inhuman. The game has received praise from critics for its unique take on the genre.

== Gameplay ==
Encyclopedia Fuckme and the Case of the Vanishing Entree is a dating sim with simple branching choices for the player to choose. The player is shown two options at each stage of the plot which change how the main character will act in reaction to the events as they unfold, in a way that is somewhat similar in structure to the Choose Your Own Adventure series. After the player reaches the end of each playthrough, they are allowed to restart and try for a different ending.

== Plot ==
The plot is told in the second person, directed towards the player, as if they are themselves the main character. The female main character, who is unnamed, receives a note from her dominant lover, Anni, who invites the main character to Anni's house. Arriving at the house and engaging in various acts of foreplay, the main character is eventually tied up. Anni begins to draw lines on the main character with a magic marker, announcing that she intends to eat the main character for dinner as she brings out a large knife. The main character escapes, but is eventually recaptured by Anni, who forces the main character to take a bath so she can be cleaned before being eaten.

In most of the branching paths, if the submissive main character resists completely or gives in completely during the bath, she is carved alive afterwards by Anni. Another ending exists, in which the main character both submits and resists, where the player is allowed by Anni for one last request. Upon asking Anni to "...please fuck me," the main character reveals that she has vagina dentata; her vagina eats Anni's fist. Anni bleeds to death and the main character survives.

== Development ==
Anna Anthropy, an independent game developer, decided to create Encyclopedia Fuckme because her real-life submissive partner inspired her to write a dating sim. In an interview with The Escapist, Anthropy rejected the stereotypical dating sim plot, which she felt fit into a "lonely nerd harem fantasy" mold every game, and instead created Encyclopedia Fuckme as a dating sim which was based on real human sexuality and emotion. Anthropy stated that Encyclopedia Fuckme was "the first game that ever got Twine much attention".

== Reception ==
Encyclopedia Fuckme and the Case of the Vanishing Entree has received mostly positive reception from critics. Kill Screen praised the game for turning established genre convictions on their head, noting "... it seriously pushes against the status quo of the medium." The A.V. Club noted that by placing the story in the second-person, "binds readers into the role of a voracious submissive," and noted that "Anthropy writes good smut." The Escapist's Leigh Alexander encouraged her readers to play the game, noting that the game "reflects a facet of the inner lives of two adults in a healthy, playful relationship," something from her perception that was new to the dating sim genre. The New Yorker's Michael Thomsen called the game one "of the most intimate and ambitious games of the past several years."

== See also ==
- BDSM in culture and media
- Cannibalism in popular culture
