= Venus in Furs (1995 film) =

1994 Dutch film

Venus in Furs is a 1995 film by filmmakers and independent art-house Dutch film producers Maartje Seyferth and Victor Nieuwenhuijs and it was their first feature film. The film has been shot on black-and-white 35mm film.

== Plot ==
The story in this film is a loose adaptation of the novel Venus in Furs by Leopold von Sacher-Masoch.

== Cast ==
- Wanda: Anne van der Ven
- Severin: André Arend van Noord

== Crew ==
- Directors: Maartje Seyferth & Victor Nieuwenhuijs
- Cinematography: Victor Nieuwenhuijs
- Lighting: Peter Gray
- Sound: Peter Burghout/Volfango Pecoraio
- Editing: Herbert van Drongelen/Maartje Seyferth

== Releases ==
- Theatrical: the Netherlands, Germany, France
- International Sales: REEL SUSPECTS.
- Video DVD: the Netherlands, Germany, France, England, Japan

== Prizes ==
- Int. Film Festival of St.Petersburg, Russia – Awarded for Creative Quest and True Professional Properties.
