= Legacy of Cain =

Novella series by Leopold von Sacher-Masoch

The Legacy of Cain (German: Das Vermächtnis Kains; sometimes translated as Heritage of Cain) is an unfinished cycle of novellas by the 19th-century Austrian author Leopold von Sacher-Masoch. His original plan was to group various novellas into 6 volumes, each of which was titled according to its central theme; those are "Love", "Property", "State", "War", "Work" and "Death". Only the first two volumes, "Love" (1870) and "Property" (1877), were completed. By the middle of the 1880s, Masoch abandoned the grandiose idea of The Legacy of Cain, although some of the novellas intended for the cycle had been published.

The first volume, Love, begins with the prologue short story called The Wanderer, in which a hunter off in the dense forest meets a wandering ascetic, whose passionate speech reveals his philosophy where Cain is responsible for having unleashed into the world the six "evils" that title each volume of the cycle. Love also contains the novella Venus in Furs that eventually became Sacher-Masoch's most famous work.

== Bibliography ==
Below is given the original content of the cycle as it was planned by Sacher-Masoch. The right column shows original German titles and the left column, their translations into English.

The Legacy of Cain

English titles	Original German titles
Volume 1: LOVE; Prologue: The Wanderer; 1. Don Juan of Kolomea; 2. The Man Who Re-Enlisted (1869); 3. Moonlight (1868); 4. Venus in Furs (1869); 5. Plato's Love (1870); 6. Marcella (1870)	TEIL 1.: DIE LIEBE; Prolog: Der Wanderer; 1. Don Juan von Kolomea; 2. Der Kapitulent; 3. Mondnacht; 4. Venus im Pelz; 5. Die Liebe des Plato; 6. Marzella oder das Märchen vom Glück
Volume 2: PROPERTY; 1. People's Court; 2. Haidamaka (1877); 3. Hasara Raba; 4. A Testament (1875?); 5. Basil Hymen (1875?); 6. The Paradise on the Dniester	TEIL 2.: DAS EIGENTUM; 1. Das Volksgericht; 2. Der Hajdamak; 3. Hasara Raba; 4. Ein Testament; 5. Basil Hymen; 6. Das Paradies am Dniester
Volume 3: STATE; 1. Ilau	TEIL 3.: DER STAAT; 1. Ilau
Volume 4: WAR	TEIL 4.: DER KRIEG
Volume 5: WORK; 1. The Old Castellan (1882)	TEIL 5.: DIE ARBEIT; 1. Der alte Castellan
Volume 6: DEATH; 1. Frau von Soldan (1882); 2. The Jewish Raphael (1882); 3. The Godmother (1883); Epilogue: The Night Before Christmas [not written]	TEIL 6.: DER TOD; 1. Frau von Soldan (1882); 2. Der Judenraphael (1882); 3. Die Gottesmutter (1883)
