= Dys4ia =

2012 video game

- Dys4ia title screen
- Publisher: Newgrounds
- Designer: Anna Anthropy
- Composer: Liz Ryerson
- Platform: Adobe Flash
- Release: NA: 9 March 2012
- Genre: Autobiography
- Mode: Single-player

Dys4ia (pronounced "dysphoria") is a 2012 abstract autobiographical Adobe Flash video game developed by Anna Anthropy, then known as Auntie Pixelante. It recounts her experiences of gender dysphoria and hormone replacement therapy. The game was originally published on Newgrounds but was later removed by Anthropy. In 2023, the game was republished on itch.io.

== Gameplay ==
Touching on the 'frustrations' of transitioning, particularly taking estrogen, the game documents a six-month period in her treatment via a succession of mini-games that reflect on gender politics, identity, and personal development.

== Development ==
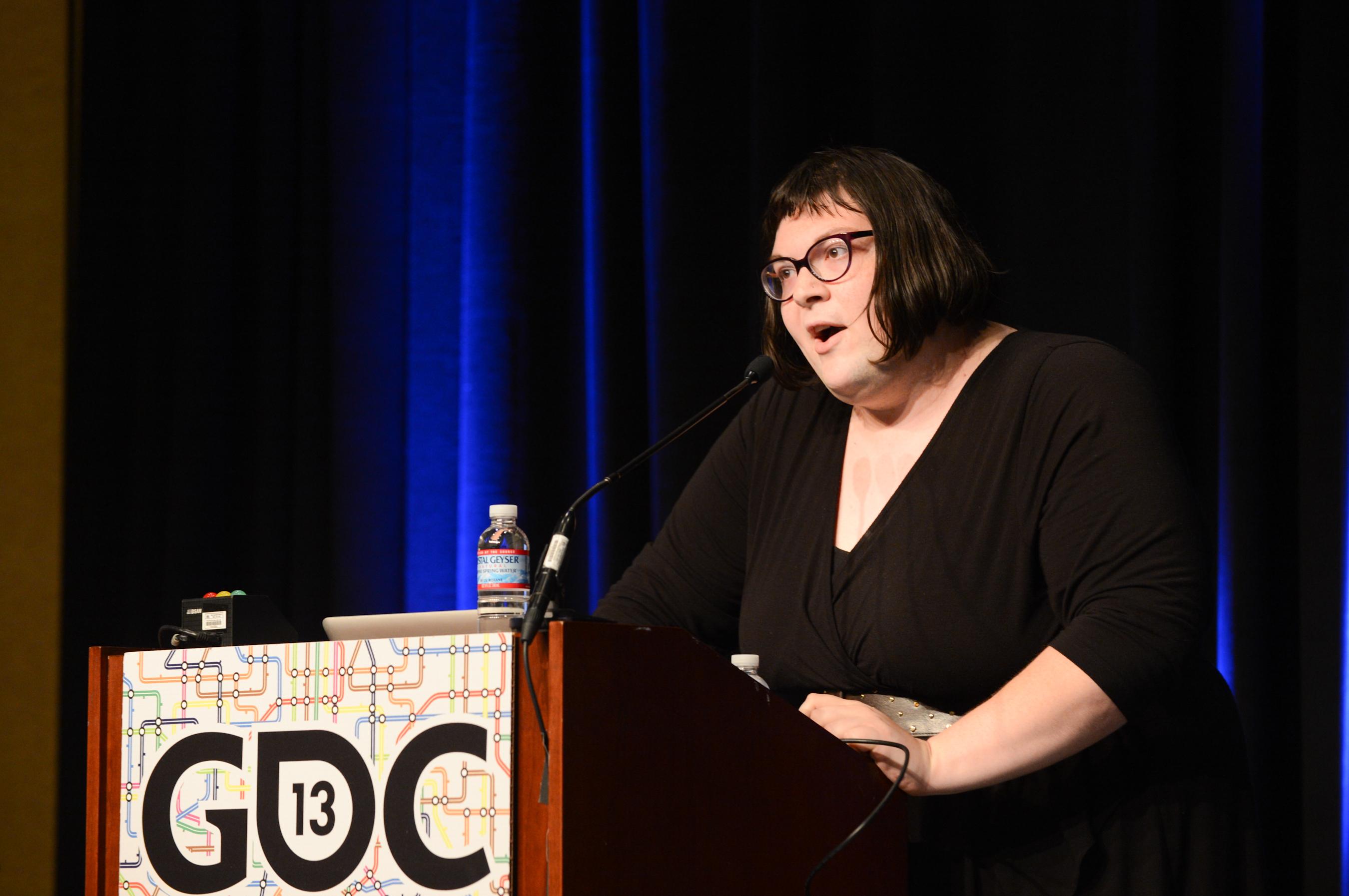
Dys4ia was created by independent developer Anna Anthropy, pictured speaking at the 2013 Game Developers Conference.

The game was developed on and off over a six-month period by Anna Anthropy. Anthropy created the story as an autobiographical title, intended to convey her experiences with gender-affirming hormone therapy over a similar six month period. Gameplay was influenced by the minigame design of WarioWare, with Anthropy designing a "collage of experiences and frustrations" through a sequence of several smaller games. She wished to convey through the game, that while these frustrations were personal, they were the result of societal systems that harmed transgender folk.

== Reception ==
Several critics praised the game as a deeply personal and autobiographical work. Adam Smith of Rock Paper Shotgun considered the game provided the player with "informative and moving" experiences, and stated the game was "very honest" in its insight into the author's life and decisions, to the point of "extreme discomfort". Similarly, Will Freeman of The Guardian praised the game's "touchy and witting insight" for proving "the power of games to communicate complex concepts through playful interactions".

dys4ia was classed as an empathy game by some writers, a term that Anthropy dismissed. She felt that true allyship takes work, self-reflection, and "is an ongoing process with no end point" that no game could replicate. She was frustrated that the game could be a shortcut for the privileged to actively avoid that work. In response, Anthropy developed Empathy Game, an installation for her Babycastles exhibition in 2015, where players could literally walk a mile in her shoes, and yet "still know nothing about the experience of being a trans woman". Also in 2015, Anthropy released ohmygod are you alright?, an autobiographical video game recording her experience being hit by a car. She considered this a direct sequel to dys4ia.

In October 2023, Anthropy republished the game on itch.io, accompanied by her reflections that she had struggled with the impact of the game and had once "disowned and disavowed it", but had since reappraised its legacy.
