= For the Love of April French =

2021 romance novel by Penny Aimes

- Author: Penny Aimes
- Genre: Romance
- Published: August 31st, 2021
- Media type: Print
- ISBN: 1335630996

For the Love of April French, also titled For the Love of April French: A Novel is a 2021 romance novel by Penny Aimes. It is her debut novel.

The novel received critical acclaim from critics, with multiple outlets calling it one of the best romance novels of the year.

== Development ==
Aimes began development on the story after beginning her transition and reading romance novels. Initially she didn't believe that the novel would be finished, but the story continued to develop as she wrote it.

Much of April's character was based on Aime's experiences as a transgender woman and her own experience in the BDSM community. She based the character's sense of being a "pit stop" on her own experiences. In stark contrast to Fifty Shades of Grey, a novel with similar BDSM themes, Aimes placed heavy emphasis on consent and agency for the character of April.

== Plot ==
The book follows April French, a transgender woman who's a regular at a kink club. She meets a man, Dennis Martin, who she falls for and challenges her resolve to box up her desire.

== Reception ==
The book received almost universally positive reviews from critics. The Washington Post included it in their 'Best romance novels of 2021', stating it was, "Rendered with sweet vulnerability and a wry sense of humor". Similarly, Vulture included it in their best of 2021, stating it was, "effortlessly inclusive and insightful". Paste Magazine gave it similar praise, praising the blend of BDSM and more "soft" romance elements.
