= Wanda von Sacher-Masoch =

Austrian writer and translator

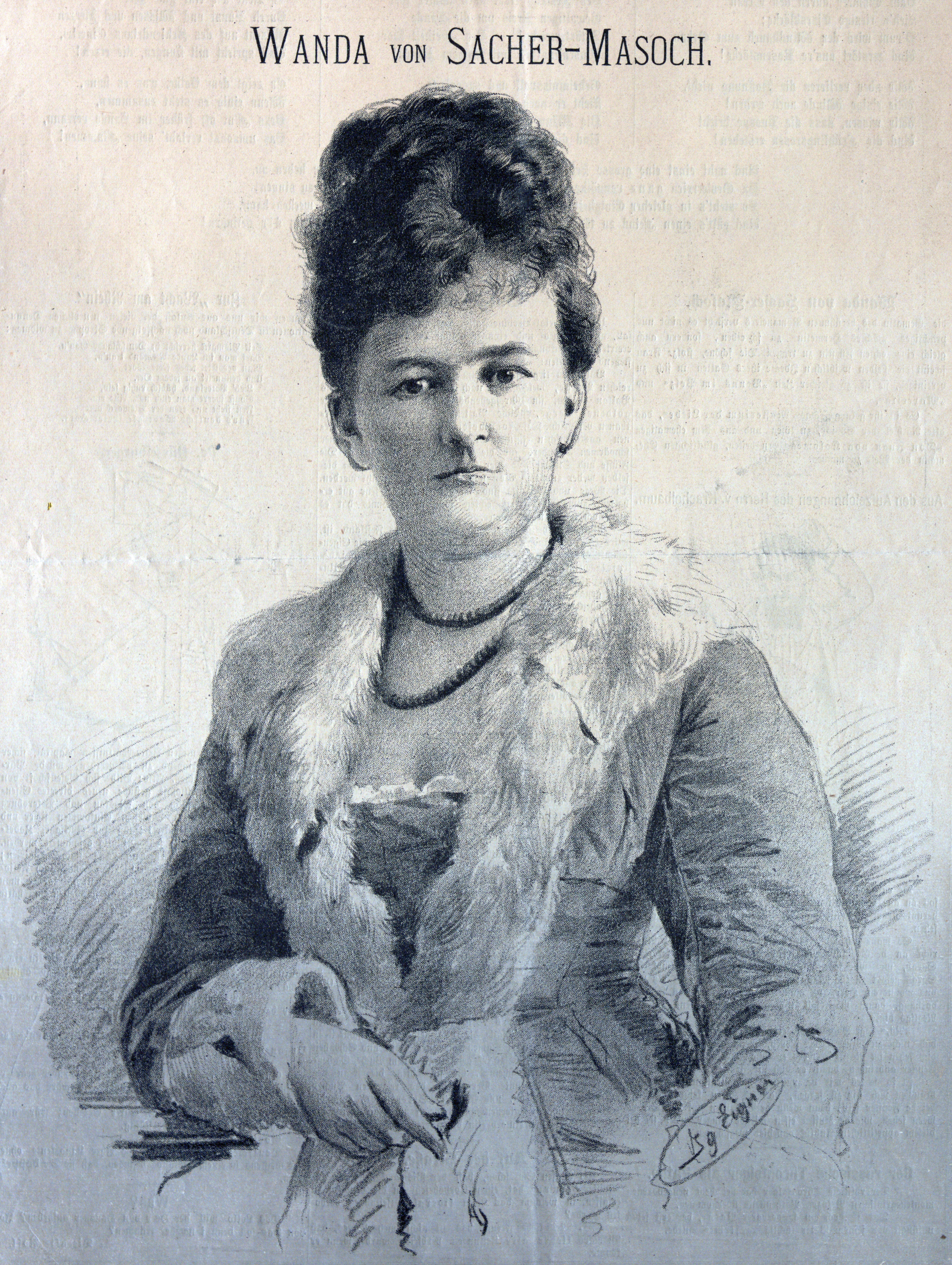
Wanda von Sacher-Masoch

Wanda von Sacher-Masoch (née Angelika Aurora Rümelin; 14 March 1845, in Graz – c. spring 1933 in Paris) was an Austrian writer and translator, the wife of Leopold von Sacher-Masoch.

== Biography ==
She was best remembered for her novel translated by Georges Ohnet from French into German titled Das Recht des Kindes (1894), and the posthumous publication The Confessions of Wanda von Sacher-Masoch (1990). She often wrote under the pseudonyms Wanda von Dunajew and D. Dolorès.
