= Anna Anthropy =

American video game designer

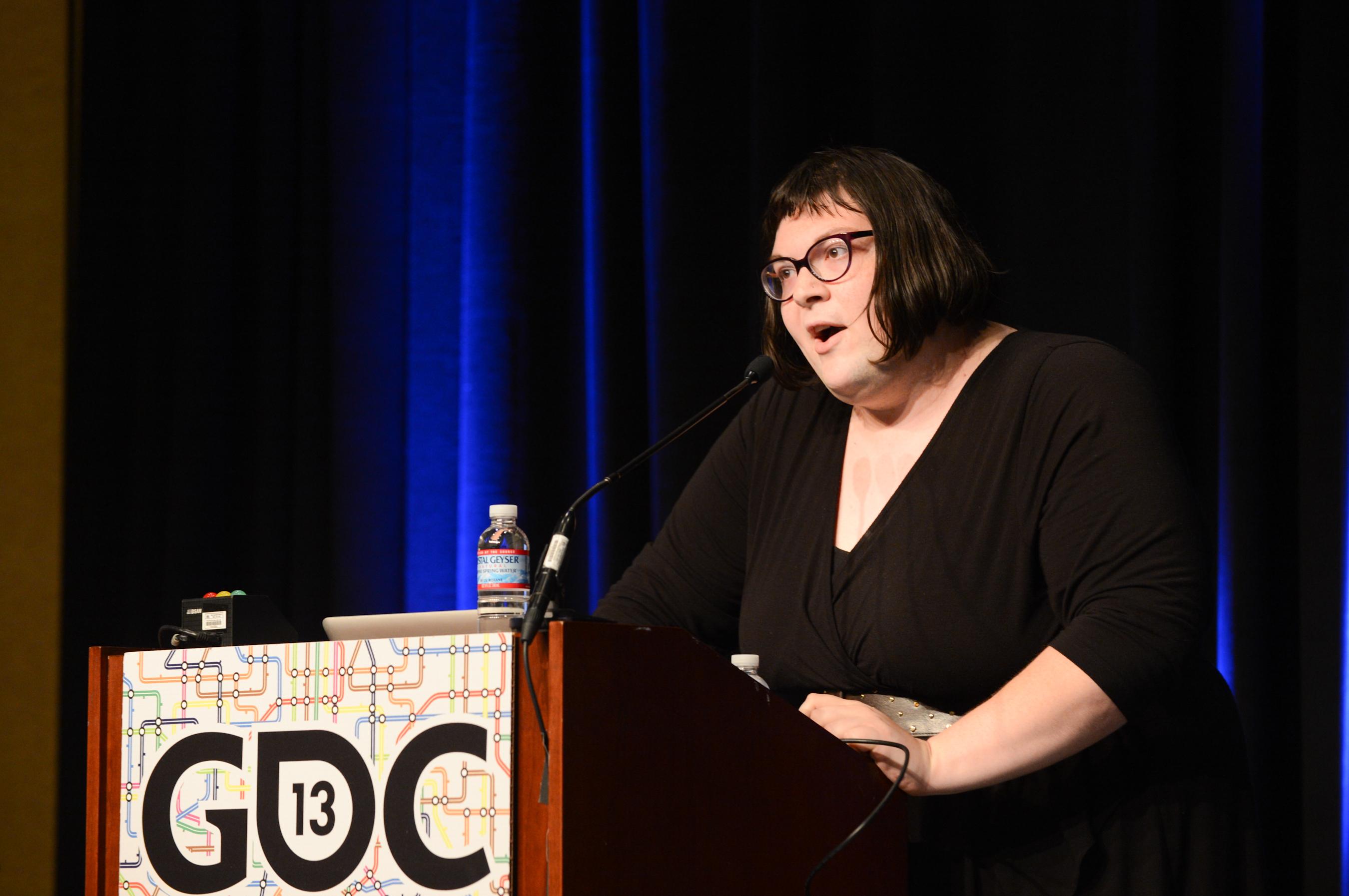
- Anthropy speaking at the 2013 Game Developers Conference
- Born: New York City
- Other names: Auntie Pixelante, Dessgeega, Ancil Anthropy
- Education: SUNY Purchase; Southern Methodist University
- Occupations: Game developer, writer
- Known for: Mighty Jill Off (2008), Dys4ia (2012)

Anna Anthropy is an American video game designer, role-playing game designer, and interactive fiction author whose works include Mighty Jill Off and Dys4ia. From 2016 - 2025 she was the game designer in residence at the DePaul University College of Computing and Digital Media. She has also gone by the name Auntie Pixelante.

== Career ==
=== Early works ===
Anna Anthropy was born and raised in New York. As a teen, Anthropy experimented with the editor in ZZT, but it was not until she discovered Game Maker while in college, that she developed her first "real game", Jaywalker: The Game of Pedestrian Revenge, about creating pile-ups at intersections. In 2008, she moved to Texas to attend the game design programme at SMU Guildhall. Frustrated at the crunch culture at the Guildhall, she did not complete the first year. While in Texas, she released Mighty Jill Off and began work on Calamity Annie, which she released on her return to New York.

In 2010, working with Koduco, a game development company based in San Francisco, Anthropy helped develop the iPad game Pong Vaders. In 2011, she released Lesbian Spider-Queens of Mars, a homage to Midway's 1981 arcade game Wizard of Wor with a queer theme and "some fun commentary on master-slave dynamics." At this point in her career, Anthropy was interested in using existing video game conventions to introduce queer themes like a Trojan Horse.

Anthropy's early works could be highly difficult, requiring a high level of skill to master. In games such as Mighty Jill Off, the difficulty was a reflection of the master and slave relationship between the designer and the player. She would later move away from challenging games, frustrated at skill requirements which limited a work's accessibility.

In 2012, she released Dys4ia, an autobiographical game about her experiences with hormone replacement therapy that "[allows] the player to experience a simulation or approximation of what she went through." Triad was included in the Chicago New Media 1973-1992 exhibition curated by Jon Cates (jonCates).

=== Rise of the Videogame Zinesters ===
Anthropy's first book, Rise of the Videogame Zinesters, was published in 2012. The book promotes the idea of "small, interesting, personal experiences by hobbyist authors ... Zinesters exists to be a kind of ambassador for that idea of what video games can be." The book also deals with an analysis of the mechanics and potentialities of digital games, including the role of chance in games and that games may be more usefully compared to theater than film ("There is always a scene called World 1-2, although each performance of World 1-2 will be different"). Anthropy criticizes the video game industry for being run by a risk-averse corporate "elite" designing formulaic video games. Zinester calls for consumers to see video games as having "cultural and artistic value" similar to artistic media such as comic books. The video game industry does not allow for a diverse cast of voices, such as queer voices, to give their input in game development, which stifles the creative process. Anthropy writes: "I have to strain to find any game that's about a queer woman, to find any game that resembles my own experience."

=== A Game Design Vocabulary ===
Anthropy co-wrote the book A Game Design Vocabulary with Naomi Clark. Keith Stuart for The Guardian called it one of twenty books every player should read, writing that, "this excellent manual gives you an entire framework and language for thinking about how games are constructed."

== Games ==
- Afternoon in the House of Secrets
- And the Robot Horse You Rode In On
- Calamity Annie
- Dys4ia
- Encyclopedia Fuckme and the Case of the Vanishing Entree
- Gay Cats Go to the Weird Weird Woods
- The Hunt for the Gay Planet
- I Love You, Alive Girl (in Hibernation Games)
- Jennifer Janowski is Doomed
- Lesbian Spider-Queens of Mars
- Keep Me Occupied
- Mighty Jill Off
- Ohmygod Are You Alright
- Police Bear
- Pong Vaders
- Princess with a Cursed Sword
- Queers in love at the end of the world
- Redder
- Swords by Starlight in The Ultimate Micro-RPG Book (Simon & Schuster)
- Tavern At the End Of the World
- Triad
- When Pigs Fly

== Bibliography ==
- Rise of the Videogame Zinesters Seven Stories Press, 2012. ISBN 9781609803728
- ZZT Boss Fight Books, 2014. ISBN 9781940535029
- The State of Play: Creators and Critics on Video Game Culture. Seven Stories Press, 2015. ISBN 9781609806392
- A Game Design Vocabulary: Exploring the Foundational Principles Behind Good Game Design. Addison-Wesley Professional, 2014. ISBN 9780133155181
- Make Your Own Twine Games! No Starch Press, 2019. ISBN 9781593279387
- Make Your Own Scratch Games! No Starch Press, 2019. ISBN 9781593279363
- Make Your Own Puzzlescript Games! No Starch Press, 2019. ISBN 9781593279448

== See also ==
- List of electronic literature authors, critics, and works
- Hypertext fiction
