= Going Under (2004 film) =

- Going Under DVD cover
- Directed by: Eric Werthman
- Written by: Eric Werthman; Jessica Gohlke
- Produced by: Jessica Gohlke; Vladan Nikolic
- Starring: Geno Lechner; Roger Rees
- Cinematography: Vladimir Subotic
- Edited by: Vladan Nikolic
- Music by: David Darling
- Distributed by: Argot Pictures (2006 theatrical); Blue Underground (2007 DVD)
- Release dates: October 22, 2004 (São Paulo Film Festival); June 15, 2006 (United States)
- Running time: 98 minutes
- Country: United States
- Language: English

Going Under is a 2004 drama film about a married man and a partnered dominatrix who form a personal relationship and begin seeing each other outside her workplace. The film stars Geno Lechner and Roger Rees and was co-written and directed by psychotherapist Eric Werthman. Its first public showing was in 2004 at the São Paulo Film Festival. It debuted theatrically in 2006 in New York City, and was released on DVD in 2007 through the independent company Blue Underground.

Going Under was praised for giving an in-depth look at the emotions involved in a sadomasochistic relationship but received mixed reactions to the clinical approach of the film, influenced by co-writer/director Eric Werthman's background in psychotherapy.

== Plot ==
Peter (Roger Rees) and his dominatrix, Suzanne (Geno Lechner), develop a personal relationship during their sadomasochistic sessions and, when Suzanne quits her job, they attempt to maintain that relationship outside her workplace, without the rules and boundaries that existed in the S&M dungeon.

During the opening credits, images are shown of frescoes from a villa in Pompeii called the Villa of the Mysteries. Of particular relevance to the film is a fresco depicting an angel with a whip.

Suzanne is in a dungeon setting with her client, Peter. Suzanne informs Peter that she is quitting at the end of the month, and gives in to Peter's request to see her on the outside. Their agreement causes Peter to be distracted at home with his wife, Pat (Kit Flanagan), and at his work as a psychotherapist. Pat confronts him and, although she already knows and accepts Peter's sadomasochistic activities, she is concerned to hear of Peter's attachment to Suzanne.

Upon meeting Peter on the outside for the first time, Suzanne is unsure if she has made the right move in deciding to see him, but her curiosity overpowers her reluctance and they continue talking. Later, it becomes apparent that Suzanne is just as preoccupied by their relationship as Peter, when she is shown in bed with her girlfriend, Miko (Miho Nikaido), who notices Suzanne's distraction and confronts her about it.

Flashback to Peter, calling himself "Robert", meeting for the first time Suzanne, who was going by the name "Mistress Diana". He removes his clothes and tensely waits for her. He describes to her his favorite masochistic acts and she begins their session. They feel a connection quickly and at the end of that session, they share their real names.

In the present time, Suzanne's relationship with Miko is faltering. Peter is struggling to write a psychiatric paper, remembering his childhood of coping with a severe learning disability and Attention Deficit Disorder.

Peter and Suzanne continue exploring their S&M relationship in flashbacks, with Peter receiving piercings and pinching. Outside the dungeon, Peter clings to her, but also tries to analyze her or overpower her at the same time. In a meeting at a diner, Suzanne tells Peter about a time in her teens when she tried to make friends with a boy named Tim in a new community by performing oral sex on him. Suzanne says she felt proud of herself until everyone at her new school found out about it. Peter suggests that if the memory did not still hurt, she would not have brought it up. He tells her about his struggles in school with a learning disability and how it still affects him. Suzanne again becomes uncomfortable with Peter's intimacy with her.

After Suzanne puts off meeting with Peter on the outside again, he goes to an S&M club, but he is unable to get in the mood and stops his dominatrix, Mistress Terry (Angela Forrest), shortly after she begins flogging him. He leaves a pleading message on Suzanne's answering machine. Rather than meet with him again, she goes to Philadelphia for a one-time session with an old client, facilitated by Suzanne's former madam, Juno (Phyllis Somerville). When she returns to New York City, she gets news that her mother, Gretchen (Jenny Sterlin), has cancer. She calls Peter to drive her to her mother's house. Suzanne and her mother are shown to have a tense relationship, causing her to lean on Peter after the visit.

Peter drives Suzanne back to her apartment and they go inside. They begin passionately kissing for the first time. Suzanne says that she will never be comfortable with how they met, and although she seems to want more, she stops Peter before he penetrates her. She leaves the room only to return and begin to allow Peter to touch her again sexually, at which point her face goes blank and she collapses in his arms, sinking to the floor. Peter sits with her for a while and returns home.

Days later, they meet again outdoors. Suzanne says she cannot allow herself to want Peter. He says he understands how she feels but does not want to lose her, but Suzanne ends the relationship anyway.

In the final scene, Peter and Pat are sitting lakeside. Peter apologizes for the things he has done to hurt her through his relationship with Suzanne. Finally, in a voice-over telephone conversation, Peter asks Suzanne if they can meet on the outside again, and Suzanne says it will not be any different than it was a year ago. Peter falls silent.

== Production ==
=== Cast ===
- Geno Lechner as Suzanne. Geno Lechner felt an unexplainable connection to the film before knowing if she would actually play Suzanne. After she and co-star Roger Rees met with director Eric Werthman, they went to a dungeon where Lechner and Rees saw the S&M world up-close for the first time. Despite having no previous experience, Lechner's training for the film paid off: her performance was so convincing to some professional dominatrices who saw the film that they asked the director if she really was a dominatrix.
- Roger Rees as Peter. Roger Rees's agents originally told him that Going Under would be too racy and they weren't going to send him the script. However, Rees prefers to play diverse and challenging roles rather than the same types of characters, so he asked them to send the script anyway. Although his character's nudity was a concern, he decided the story made it worthwhile.
- Other cast: Kit Flanagan as Pat, Miho Nikaido as Miko, Jon Johnson as Crying man (Peter's patient), Wendy Scharfman as Paula (Peter's patient), Phyllis Somerville as Juno, Beau Van Donkelaar as Steve (Suzanne's brother), Angela Forrest as Mistress Terry, Jenny Sterlin as Gretchen.

== Distribution ==
=== Film festivals ===
Going Under has been shown at a number of American and international film festivals. The first public screening of Going Under took place at the São Paulo International Film Festival on October 22, 2004. It was named the festival's Official Selection. Other significant screenings include the CineKink Film Festival in New York City where it was shown in October 2005 and named Best Narrative Feature, and the Northampton Independent Film Festival in November 2005, where it was named Best of Fest.

=== Theatrical release ===
Going Under played in one movie theater in New York City from June 15, 2006 through June 22, 2006 (8 days). Its total gross was US$3,917.

=== Home media ===
Going Under was released on DVD by Blue Underground on June 26, 2007. It is unrated, in color, in the NTSC format, and widescreen 1.78:1/16:9. It is not closed captioned or subtitled. Its special features include audio commentary with co-writer/director Eric Werthman and Roger Rees, Pushing the Boundaries (interviews with Roger Rees and Geno Lechner), footage from the Black & Blue Ball in New York City, theatrical trailers, and a DVD-ROM essay on Going Under written by Marta Helliesen, Ph.D., a sex therapist in New York City.
