= Leopold von Sacher-Masoch =

Austrian author (1836–1895)

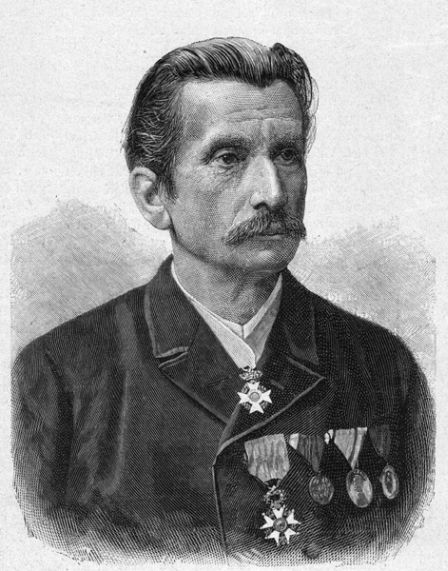
- Born: 27 January 1836; Lemberg, Kingdom of Galicia and Lodomeria, Austrian Empire (now Lviv, Ukraine)
- Died: 9 March 1895 (aged 59); Lindheim near Altenstadt, German Empire
- Occupations: Writer, journalist
- Known for: Being the namesake of masochism
- Notable work: Venus in Furs
- Relatives: Marianne Faithfull, great great niece

Leopold Ritter von Sacher-Masoch (Note: Ritter is a Germanic title of nobility translating to "knight".) (Austrian German: [ˈleːopɔld fɔn ˈsaxɐ ˈmaːsɔx]; 27 January 1836 – 9 March 1895) was an Austrian nobleman, writer and journalist, who gained renown for his romantic stories of Galician life. The term masochism is derived from his name, invented by his contemporary, the Austrian psychiatrist Richard von Krafft-Ebing. Masoch did not approve of this use of his name.

During his lifetime, Sacher-Masoch was well known as a man of letters, in particular a utopian thinker who espoused socialist and humanist ideals in his fiction and non-fiction. Most of his works remain untranslated into English.

== Biography ==
=== Early life and education ===
Sacher-Masoch was born in the city of Lemberg, the capital of the Kingdom of Galicia and Lodomeria (now Lviv, Ukraine), at the time a province of the Austrian Empire, into a Roman Catholic family. His father was an Austrian civil servant, Leopold Johann Nepomuk Ritter von Sacher, and his mother Charlotte Josepha von Masoch, a Ukrainian noblewoman. The father later combined his surname with his wife's von Masoch, at the request of her family (she was the last of the line). Sacher served as a Commissioner of the Imperial Police Forces in Lemberg, and he was recognised with a new title of Austrian nobility as Sacher-Masoch awarded by the Austrian Emperor.

Leopold studied law, history and mathematics at Graz University (where he obtained a doctorate in history in 1856), and after graduating he became a lecturer there.

=== Galician storyteller ===
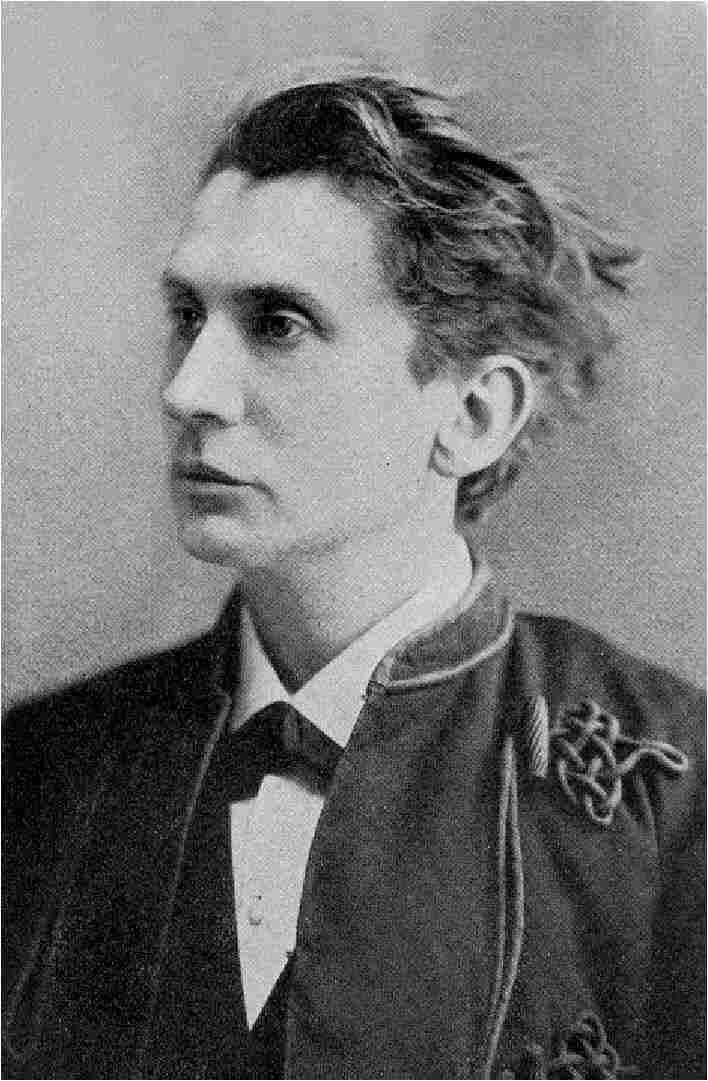
Masoch in the 1860s

His early, non-fictional publications dealt mostly with Austrian history. At the same time, Masoch turned to the folklore and culture of his homeland, Galicia. Soon he abandoned lecturing and became a free man of letters. Within a decade his short stories and novels prevailed over his historical non-fiction works, though historical themes continued to imbue his fiction.

Panslavist ideas were prevalent in Masoch's literary work, and he found a particular interest in depicting picturesque types among the various ethnicities that inhabited Galicia. From the 1860s to the 1880s he published a number of volumes of Jewish Short Stories, Polish Short Stories, Galician Short Stories, German Court Stories and Russian Court Stories.

=== The Legacy of Cain ===
In 1869, Sacher-Masoch conceived a grandiose series of short stories under the collective title Legacy of Cain that would represent the author's aesthetic Weltanschauung (worldview). The cycle opened with the manifesto The Wanderer that brought out misogynist themes that became peculiar to Masoch's writings. Of the six planned volumes, only the first two were ever completed. By the middle of the 1880s, Masoch abandoned the Legacy of Cain. Nevertheless, the published volumes of the series included Masoch's best-known stories, and of them, Venus in Furs (published 1870) is the most famous today. The novella expressed Sacher-Masoch's fantasies and fetishes (especially for dominant women wearing fur). He did his best to live out his fantasies with his mistresses and wives. In 1873 he married Angelika Aurora von Rümelin.

=== Private life and inspiration for Venus in Furs ===
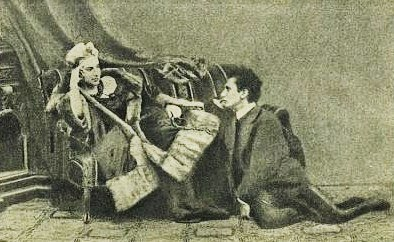
Fanny Pistor and Sacher-Masoch

Fanny Pistor was an emerging literary writer. She met Sacher-Masoch after she contacted him, under the assumed name and fictitious title of Baroness Bogdanoff, for suggestions on improving her writing to make it suitable for publication. She was the inspiration for Venus im Pelz (Venus in Furs). The erotic novel spawned the word masochism.

=== Later years ===
In 1874, Masoch wrote the novel Die Ideale unserer Zeit (The Ideals of Our Time), an attempt to give a portrait of German society during its Gründerzeit period.

In his late fifties, his mental health began to deteriorate, and he spent the last years of his life under psychiatric care. According to official reports, he died in Lindheim in 1895. (Lindheim, at that time near Altenstadt, was incorporated into the municipality of Altenstadt in 1971.) It is also claimed that Masoch died in an asylum in Mannheim in 1905.

=== Trivia ===
Sacher-Masoch is the great-great-uncle, through her Austrian-born mother Eva von Sacher-Masoch, Baroness Erisso, of the late English Rock star and film actress Marianne Faithfull. She died on 30 January 2025.

== Masochism ==
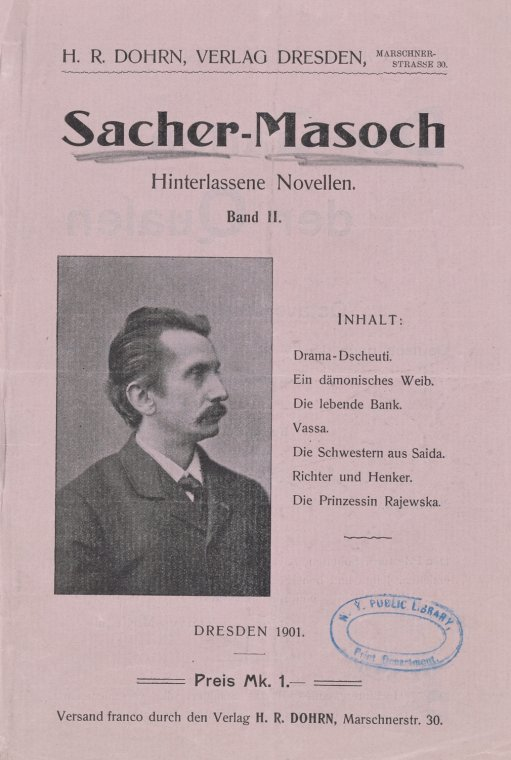
A Sacher-Masoch compilation published in 1901

The term masochism was coined in 1886 by the Austrian psychiatrist Richard Freiherr von Krafft-Ebing (1840–1902) in his book Psychopathia Sexualis:

...I feel justified in calling this sexual anomaly "Masochism", because the author Sacher-Masoch frequently made this perversion, which up to his time was quite unknown to the scientific world as such, the substratum of his writings. I followed thereby the scientific formation of the term "Daltonism", from Dalton, the discoverer of colour-blindness.
During recent years facts have been advanced which prove that Sacher-Masoch was not only the poet of Masochism, but that he himself was afflicted with the anomaly. Although these proofs were communicated to me without restriction, I refrain from giving them to the public. I refute the accusation that "I have coupled the name of a revered author with a perversion of the sexual instinct", which has been made against me by some admirers of the author and by some critics of my book. As a man, Sacher-Masoch cannot lose anything in the estimation of his cultured fellow-beings simply because he was afflicted with an anomaly of his sexual feelings. As an author, he suffered severe injury so far as the influence and intrinsic merit of his work is concerned, for so long and whenever he eliminated his perversion from his literary efforts he was a gifted writer, and as such would have achieved real greatness had he been actuated by normally sexual feelings. In this respect he is a remarkable example of the powerful influence exercised by the vita sexualis be it in the good or evil sense over the formation and direction of man's mind.

Sacher-Masoch was not pleased with Krafft-Ebing's assertions. Nevertheless, details of Masoch's private life were obscure until Aurora von Rümelin's memoirs, Meine Lebensbeichte (My Life Confession; 1906), were published in Berlin under the pseudonym Wanda v. Dunajew (the name of a leading character in his Venus in Furs). The following year, a French translation, Confession de ma vie (1907) by "Wanda von Sacher-Masoch", was printed in Paris by Mercure de France. An English translation of the French edition was published as The Confessions of Wanda von Sacher-Masoch (1991) by RE/Search Publications.

== Selected bibliography ==
- 1858 A Galician Story 1846
- 1865 Kaunitz
- 1866 Don Juan of Kolomiya
- 1867 The Last King of Hungary
- 1870 The Divorcee
- 1870 Legacy of Cain Vol. 1: Love (includes his most famous work, Venus in Furs)
- 1872 Faux Ermine
- 1873 Female Sultan
- 1873 The Messalinas of Vienna
- 1873–74 Russian Court Stories: 4 Vols.
- 1873–77 Viennese Court Stories: 2 Vols.
- 1874/76 Liebesgeschichten aus verschiedenen Jahrhunderten [Love Stories from Several Centuries], 3 volumes, includes "Die Bluthochzeit zu Kiew" ("Bloody Wedding in Kyiv"), "Ariella"
- 1874 Die Ideale unserer Zeit [The Ideals of Our Time]
- 1875 Galician Stories
- 1877 The Man Without Prejudice
- 1877 Legacy of Cain. Vol. 2: Property
- 1878 The New Hiob
- 1878 Jewish Stories
- 1878 The Republic of Women's Enemies
- 1879 Silhouettes
- 1881 New Jewish Stories
- 1883 Die Gottesmutter (The Mother of God)
- 1886 Eternal Youth
- 1886 Stories from Polish Ghetto
- 1886 Little Mysteries of World History
- 1886 Bloody Wedding in Kyiv'
- 1887 Polish Stories
- 1890 The Serpent in Paradise
- 1891 The Lonesome
- 1894 Love Stories
- 1898 Entre nous
- 1900 Catherina II
- 1901 Afrikas Semiramis
- 1907 Fierce Women

== See also ==
- BDSM
- List of Austrian writers
- Marquis de Sade
- Sadism and masochism in fiction
- Story of O
