= Deaths in July 1986 =

The following is a list of notable deaths in July 1986.

Entries for each day are listed alphabetically by surname. A typical entry lists information in the following sequence:

- Name, age, country of citizenship at birth, subsequent country of citizenship (if applicable), reason for notability, cause of death (if known), and reference.

== July 1986 ==
=== 1 ===
- Adil Abdullah, 63, Iraqi footballer.
- Jean Baratte, 63, French footballer.
- Willy Berger, 80, Hungarian-born Israeli footballer.
- Harry Bolton, 67, American NFL football player (Detroit Lions).
- Alf Bond, 75, English football referee.
- E. E. Y. Hales, 77, English religious historian.
- Willard Ames Holbrook Jr., 88, American general.
- Christa Merten, 41, West German Olympic runner (1972), suicide.
- Andrew Miller, 59, British naval admiral.
- Moccasin, 23, American Thoroughbred racehorse, euthanized.
- John Murio, 84, American tennis player.
- Karl Myrbäck, 85, Swedish chemist.
- Sam Ramsden, 72, Australian politician.
- Sir Iain Sutherland, 61, British diplomat, heart attack.
- Roger Cuthbert Wakefield, 80, English surveyor and rugby player.
- Edward Curtis Wells, 75, American business executive (Boeing).

=== 2 ===
- Alfred Grimwood, 80, English cricketer.
- Louis Harant, 90, American Olympic sports shooter (1920).
- Hoàng Văn Thái, 71, Vietnamese general.
- René Létourneau, 73, Canadian politician.
- Peanuts Lowrey, 68, American Major League baseball player.
- Erwin Milzkott, 73, German musician.
- Hilyard Robinson, 86–87, American architect.

=== 3 ===
- Jonathan B. Bingham, 72, American politician, member of the U.S. House of Representatives (1965–1983), pneumonia.
- Elizabeth Bodine, 88, American humanitarian.
- Charles Chew, 63, American politician, member of the Illinois Senate (since 1967), throat cancer.
- Bruce Chown, 92, Canadian physician.
- Ubirajara Fidalgo, 37, Brazilian actor and director.
- Monk Higgins, 55, American saxophonist, respiratory disease.
- Bill McCahan, 65, American Major League baseball player, cancer.
- Quinn McNemar, 86, American psychologist and statistician.
- Mona Ray, 81, American actress.
- Curley Russell, 69, American jazz musician, emphysema.
- Andrew C. Tychsen, 93, American general.
- Rudy Vallée, 84, American singer and musician, cancer.
- Erling Westher, 83, Norwegian pianist.

=== 4 ===
- Paul Adams, 65, American college sports coach, heart attack.
- Margaret Cuninggim, 71, American academic administrator.
- Leo Lermond, 80, American Olympic runner (1928).
- Peter F. Mack Jr., 69, American politician, member of the U.S. House of Representatives (1949–1963).
- Benjamin Menor, 63, American jurist, throat cancer.
- Flor Peeters, 83, Belgian composer.
- Oscar Roettger, 86, American Major League baseball player.
- Eddie Shu, 67, American jazz musician.
- Theodor S. Slen, 100, American politician and lawyer, member of the Minnesota House of Representatives (1935–1940), pneumonia.
- Oscar Zariski, 87, Russian-born American mathematician.

=== 5 ===
- Thomas Arnold, 85, British Olympic bobsledder (1924).
- Noel Counihan, 72, Australian painter and cartoonist.
- Alan Gemmell, 73, British biologist and botanist.
- Rosaire Gendron, 65, Canadian politician.
- Ulrich Hofmann, 83, German mathematician.
- Ruth Jones, 40, American basketball coach, ovarian cancer.
- Javad Khamenei, 90, Iranian Shia cleric.
- Biff Lee, 78, American NFL football player.
- Richard Lowe, 82, English cricketer.
- Gisiro Maruyama, 70, Japanese mathematician.
- O Yoon, 40, South Korean painter, cirrhosis.
- Benjamin B. Patterson, 76, American politician, member of the Minnesota Senate (1957–1966).
- K. Krishna Pillai, 62, Indian politician.
- Sir Folliott Sandford, 79, British civil servant.
- Albert Scherrer, 78, Swiss racing driver.
- Georg-Wilhelm Schulz, 80, German U-boat commander.
- Yaroslav Stetsko, 74, Soviet Ukrainian politician, prime minister of the Ukrainian national government (1941).
- Sir John Toothill, 77, English electrical engineer.
- James Walsh, 73, Australian cricketer.

=== 6 ===
- Stephen Brunauer, 83, American chemist.
- Vic Carroll, 73, American NFL football player (Washington Redskins, New York Giants).
- Germán Frers, 86, Argentine Olympic sailor (1936).
- Walter Hollitscher, 75, Austrian philosopher.
- Lothar Kreyssig, 87, German jurist.
- Andrée Le Coultre, 68–69, French painter.
- Herbert Leonhardt, 61, German Olympic skier (1956).
- Robert S. Lopez, 75, Italian-born American historian, cancer.
- Jagjivan Ram, 78, Indian politician.
- Rodrigo Rojas de Negri, 19, Chilean photographer, burned.
- Clarence Streit, 90, American journalist, renal failure.
- Kōji Wada, 42, Japanese actor.
- Blanka Waleská, 76, Czech actress.
- Benjamin D. Wood, 91, American academic administrator.
- Clarrie Wyatt, 82, Australian rules footballer.
- Eddie Yuhas, 61, American Major League baseball player.

=== 7 ===
- Willi Ankermüller, 85, German politician.
- Mai Bhagi, 79–80, Pakistani musician.
- Carnera, 77, Brazilian footballer.
- Gunnar Christensen, 72, Danish Olympic athlete (1936).
- Harry Davis, 75, Welsh-born New Zealand potter.
- Frederick Kohner, 80, Austrian-born American novelist (Gidget).
- Sven Johnson, 86, Swedish Olympic gymnast (1920).
- Christopher C. McGrath, 84, American politician, member of the U.S. House of Representatives (1949–1953).
- Earl J. Merritt, 89, American sports coach.
- Len Vautier, 77, Australian rules footballer.
- Hazel Browne Williams, 79, American educator.

=== 8 ===
- C. W. Armstrong, 87, Northern Irish politician, MP (1954–1959).
- Paolo Brignoli, 44, Italian entomologist.
- Johnny Cooney, 85, American Major League baseball player.
- Adolfo Linvel, 74–75, Argentine actor.
- Nina Morgana, 94, American singer.
- Pedro Ortiz Dávila, 74, Puerto Rican singer.
- Hyman G. Rickover, 86, American admiral.
- Skeeter Webb, 76, American Major League baseball player.
- Robert J. Wood, 81, American general.

=== 9 ===
- Tommy Barnett, 77, English footballer.
- Nellie Campobello, 85, Mexican writer, heart failure.
- Marietta Canty, 80, American actress.
- Calvin Carter, 61, American record producer.
- Julio Córdova, 75, Chilean footballer.
- Laxmi Narayan Bhanja Deo, 73, Indian politician.
- Sir Percy Edward Kent, 73, British geologist.
- María Laffitte, 83, Spanish women's rights activist and writer.
- John Leighly, 90, American geographer.
- Carl "Spider" Lockhart, 43, American NFL football player, lymphoma.
- Red Lucas, 84, American Major League baseball player.
- Boris Mayzel, 79, Soviet composer.
- Walter Romanowicz, 68, American soccer player.
- Chandrashekhar Singh, 58, Indian politician.
- Ruth Warren, 85, American actress.
- Paul Yuzyk, 73, Canadian politician.

=== 10 ===
- Rafael Gil, 73, Spanish film director.
- Brendan Glynn, 76, Irish politician, TD (1954–1957).
- Jody Lawrance, 55, American actress.
- Lê Duẩn, 79, Vietnamese politician.
- Harl Maggert, 72, American Major League baseball player.
- Csilla Molnár, 17, Hungarian beauty queen, suicide by drug overdose.
- Nicholas VI, 73, Greek Orthodox prelate, patriarch of Alexandria (since 1968).
- Park Taewon, 76, Korean writer.
- Aukusti Pasanen, 83, Finnish politician.
- Tadeusz Piotrowski, 46, Polish mountaineer, fall.
- Roman Ulrich Sexl, 46, Austrian theoretical physicist.
- Štefan Stanislay, 83, Czechoslovak athlete.
- Don S. Wenger, 74, American general.

=== 11 ===
- John Clayden, 82, Rhodesian jurist.
- Larry D. Gilbertson, 68, American politician.
- Lillian Rosanoff Lieber, 99, Russian-born American mathematician.
- Bill Purcell, 81, Australian rules footballer.
- Hortensia Santoveña, 73, Mexican actress.
- Dutch Thiele, 93, American NFL football player.
- Enrique Villegas, 72, Argentine pianist.
- Lucille Wall, 88, American actress (General Hospital).

=== 12 ===
- Dame Kate Isabel Campbell, 87, Australian physician.
- Ingram Capper, 78, British Olympic sports shooter (1952)
- Wacław Kisielewski, 43, Polish pianist, traffic collision.
- Faydang Lobliayao, 75–76, Laotian politician.
- Dermod MacCarthy, 75, British pediatrician.
- Gene Mayl, 84, American NFL footballer and basketballer.
- Nea Morin, 81, British mountaineer.
- Kamaran Mukeri, 56–57, Iraqi poet.
- Krum Penev, 84, Bulgarian poet and playwright.
- Jean Zizine, 63, French Olympic field hockey player (1952).

=== 13 ===
- Sir Max Bemrose, 82, English politician and industrialist.
- Walter Bradshaw, 77, Australian-born British cricketer.
- Coke Escovedo, 45, American percussionist, cirrhosis.
- Gary Famiglietti, 72, American NFL football player.
- Edmund Dwen Gill, 77, Australian geologist.
- Brion Gysin, 70, British-Canadian writer, painter and inventor, lung cancer.
- Hong Jin-ki, 69, South Korean jurist.
- Géza Kardos, 68, Hungarian Olympic basketball player (1948).
- Orígenes Lessa, 83, Brazilian writer.
- Edward Lipiński, 97, Polish politician and economist.
- Margaret Ransone Murray, 84, American biologist.
- Ladislav Pešek, 79, Czechoslovak actor.
- Ralph Steiner, 87, American photographer.
- Jaak Tamleht, 44, Soviet Estonian actor.
- Jean Van Gool, 55, French footballer.
- Joe Wirkkunen, 58, Finnish-Canadian ice hockey coach, home fire accident
- Mel Zajac, 30, Canadian Olympic swimmer (1976), drowned.

=== 14 ===
- John Bridger, 66, English cricketer, traffic collision.
- Arthur Ford, 82–83, Australian Olympic wrestler (1928).
- Anthony Hadingham, 73, English cricketer.
- William E. Hess, 88, American politician, member of the U.S. House of Representatives (1929–1937, 1939–1949, 1951–1961).
- Wally Holborow, 72, American Major League baseball player.
- Raymond Loewy, 92, French-born American industrial designer.
- Mehdi Hamidi Shirazi, 72, Iranian poet.
- Joseph Vogt, 91, German historian.
- Jack Whitehead, 73, Australian rules footballer.

=== 15 ===
- Carolina Correa Londoño, 81, Colombian socialite, first lady (1953–1957).
- Florence Halop, 63, American actress, lung cancer.
- Iain Hamilton, 66, Scottish journalist.
- Billy Haughton, 62, American harness driver, head injury.
- Sir John Mellor, 2nd Baronet, 93, British politician, MP (1935–1955).
- Benny Rubin, 87, American actor and comedian, heart attack.
- Alfonso Thiele, 66, American-Italian racing driver.

=== 16 ===
- Joseph T. Bayly, 66, American author and publishing executive.
- Vasudeo Sitaram Bendrey, 92, Indian author and historian.
- Robert Boothby, Baron Boothby, 86, British politician, MP (1924–1958) and member of the House of Lords (since 1958), heart attack.
- A. S. Conception, 58, Indian actor and singer.
- James Aloysius Coolahan, 83, American jurist.
- Stephen Coulter, 71, British novelist.
- Dick Crawshaw, Baron Crawshaw of Aintree, 68, British politician, MP (1964–1983).
- David Max Eichhorn, 80, American rabbi, heart attack.
- Carlo Martini, 72, Italian Roman Catholic prelate.
- Thomas Edwin Nevin, 79, Irish physicist.
- Bob O'Dea, 56, New Zealand rugby player.
- Bill Rohr, 68, American basketball coach.
- Robert C. Rusack, 60, American Anglican prelate, heart attack.
- Charles E. Thompson, 97, American politician, member of the Mississippi Senate (1916–1920).
- Claire Watson, 59, American singer, brain cancer.
- Jerrold R. Zacharias, 81, American physicist.

=== 17 ===
- Nicholas Ashton, 81, English cricketer.
- Alexandru Badea, 48, Romanian footballer.
- René de La Croix de Castries, 77, French historian.
- Cleo Davis, 67, American musician.
- Louis Gardet, 81, French historian and Roman Catholic priest.
- Gordon Gibson Sr., 81, Canadian politician.
- Pierre Langlais, 76, French soldier, suicide by jumping.
- Tom MacKay, 75, Australian rules footballer.
- Norma Moreno Figueroa, 24, Mexican journalist, shot.
- Kurt Nielsen, 61, Danish footballer.
- George M. O'Brien, 69, American politician, member of the U.S. House of Representatives (since 1973), prostate cancer.
- Oevaang Oeray, 63, Indonesian politician.
- René Pedroli, 71, Swiss road bicycle racer.
- Edward E. Willey, 76, American politician, member of the Virginia Senate (since 1952), complications from a stroke.

=== 18 ===
- Buddy Baer, 71, American boxer and actor.
- Allan R. Bosworth, 84, American author.
- Robert Cover, 42, American law scholar, heart attack.
- Margaret Crum, 65, British musicologist.
- Maiju Gebhard, 89, Finnish inventor (dish drying cabinet).
- J. Lister Holmes, 95, American architect.
- Emil Nofal, 59–60, South African filmmaker.
- Sir Stanley Rous, 91, English football referee, president of FIFA (1961–1974), leukemia.
- Flora Payne Whitney, 88, American artist.
- Don Wilkerson, 53–54, American saxophonist.
- Richard Wootton, 80, Australian cricketer.

=== 19 ===
- Andre the Seal, 25, American harbor seal.
- Alfredo Binda, 83, Italian racing cyclist.
- James Jewett Carnes, 86, American soldier.
- Daniel L. Fapp, 82, American cinematographer (The Great Escape, West Side Story).
- Česlovas Gedgaudas, 77, Soviet Lithuanian diplomat.
- Glenn Graham, 82, American Olympic pole vaulter (1924).
- Noel Hazzard, 62, Australian rugby league player.
- Alfred Leopold Luongo, 65, American jurist.
- Margaret Schlauch, 87, American-Polish historian.
- Harold Schuster, 83, American film director.
- Murray Vaughan, 87, Canadian philanthropist.

=== 20 ===
- Joan Bennett, 90, British literary scholar.
- Helen Craig, 74, American actress, cardiac arrest.
- Liviu Damian, 51, Romanian writer.
- Eric Donaldson, 86, Australian rules footballer.
- Sam Gary, 69, American blues musician.
- Héctor Guerrero, 59, Mexican Olympic basketball player (1948, 1952).
- Bo Molenda, 81, American NFL football player.
- Bill Steinecke, 79, American Major League baseball player.

=== 21 ===
- José Avelino, 95, Filipino politician.
- Ion Caraion, 63, Romanian poet.
- Cyrus Hashemi, 47, Iranian arms dealer, leukemia.
- Kenneth Holland, 75, English cricketer.
- John J. Livingood, 83, American physicist.
- Ernest Maas, 94, American screenwriter.
- Timothy O'Connor, 79, Irish politician, TD (1961–1981).
- Zhang Yuzhe, 84, Chinese astronomer.

=== 22 ===
- Aurelian Andreescu, 44, Romanian singer, heart attack.
- Ted Baker, 85, Australian rules footballer.
- Ren-Chang Ching, 88, Chinese botanist.
- Edward Garmatz, 83, American politician, member of the U.S. House of Representatives (1947–1973).
- Jacques Gelman, 75–77, Russian-born Mexican film producer.
- Floyd Gottfredson, 81, American comic book cartoonist.
- Ede Staal, 44, Dutch musician, cancer.

=== 23 ===
- Adolfo Baloncieri, 88, Italian footballer.
- Benny Benack, 64, American jazz musician.
- Karel Kváček, 74, Czech Olympic wrestler (1936).
- Billy Joe Mantooth, 35, American NFL football player, traffic collision.
- Sir Bryan Matthews, 80, British physiologist.
- Carlos Humberto Rodríguez Quirós, 76, Costa Rican Roman Catholic prelate.
- Don Seymour, 70, Australian rules footballer.
- Kazimierz Sikorski, 91, Polish composer.
- Mavis Sweeney, 76–77, Australian pharmacist.
- Sylvanus A. Tyler, 71, American mathematician.
- Sofia W. D., 61, Indonesian actress and film director.

=== 24 ===
- Bernie Bradley, 76, American sports coach.
- Clarence Garlow, 75, American musician.
- Jim Gordon, 77, Australian soldier, VC recipient.
- Urban Hansen, 77, Danish politician.
- Lee Hepner, 65, Canadian conductor.
- Willy Kaiser, 74, German Olympic boxer (1936).
- Gertrude W. Klein 92, American politician, member of the New York City Council (1942-1945).
- Karl Kühn, 82, Austrian Olympic cyclist (1936).
- Jayadevi Taayi Ligade, 74, Indian poet.
- Fritz Albert Lipmann, 87, German-American biochemist, Nobel Prize recipient (1953).
- Laurie Nash, 76, Australian rules footballer and cricketer.
- Karel Nedobitý, 80, Czechoslovak Olympic runner (1924, 1928).
- Fernand Pouillon, 74, French architect.
- Qudrat Ullah Shahab, 69, Pakistani writer.
- Trần Văn Chương, 88, South Vietnamese diplomat, strangled.
- Yoshiyuki Tsuruta, 82, Japanese Olympic swimmer (1928, 1932), stroke.

=== 25 ===
- John Coldham, 85, English cricketer.
- Jacob Hackenburg Griffiths-Randolph, 71, Ghanaian jurist.
- Eric Hawkey, 77, Australian Anglican prelate.
- Ted Lyons, 85, American Hall of Fame Major League baseball player and manager (Chicago White Sox).
- Vincente Minnelli, 83, American film director.
- Thomas Moone, 77, American Olympic ice hockey player (1936).
- Alison Parrott, 11, Canadian murder victim.

=== 26 ===
- Frederick W. Ford, 76, American government official, chairman of the FCC (1960–1961).
- Bill Gore, 74, American chemical engineer.
- W. Averell Harriman, 94, American politician, governor of New York (1955–1958), U.S. secretary of commerce (1946–1948).
- Heinz Lazek, 74, Austrian-German boxer.
- Gerda Madsen, 84, Danish actress.
- Dominique Mbonyumutwa, 65, Rwandan politician, interim president (1961).
- Mubarak, 77, Indian actor and film director.
- Ervin Mueller, 81, American politician.
- Sukarno M. Noor, 54, Indonesian actor.
- Boris Režek, 77, Slovenian Olympic skier (1928).
- Webb Schultz, 88, American Major League baseball player.
- Edwin DeHaven Steel Jr., 82, American jurist.
- Ken Watson, 81, Canadian curler.
- Frederick S. Wight, 84, American painter.

=== 27 ===
- Margarita Argúas, 83, Argentine lawyer.
- Henry Bridges, 70, American saxophonist.
- Anna Sofie Boesen Dreijer, 87, Danish costume designer.
- Kenn Duncan, 57, American dance photographer
- Louise Fluke, 86, American art teacher, designed the flag of Oklahoma.
- Bud Hafey, 73, American Major league baseball player.
- LeRoy Holmes, 72, American musician.
- Hitoshi Kihara, 92, Japanese geneticist.
- Sir Osbert Lancaster, 77, English cartoonist.
- Nan McKay, 93, Canadian librarian.
- Dorothea Neff, 83, Austrian actress.

=== 28 ===
- John Alcott, 55, English cinematographer, heart attack.
- William C. Andrews, 85, British art director.
- Karel Aubroeck, 91, Belgian sculptor.
- Jim Braxton, 37, American NFL football player, lung cancer.
- Syd Curnow, 78, South African cricketer.
- William Robert Johnson, 67, American prelate.
- Edmund Kolanowski, 38, Polish serial killer, execution by hanging.
- Ernst Leuenberger, 85, Swiss trade unionist.
- Yvan Leyvraz, 31–32, Swiss humanitarian (Solidar Suisse), shot.
- Cristóbal Martí, 83, Spanish footballer.
- Cliff Melton, 74, American Major League baseball player (New York Giants).
- Joe Oeschger, 94, American Major League baseball player.
- Bruce Irving Rankin, 67–68, Canadian diplomat.
- Karl-Heinrich Schulz, 80, German general.
- Annemarie Selinko, 71, Austrian novelist.
- Sir Frank Simpson, 87, British general.

=== 29 ===
- Richard David Barnett, 77, British archaeologist.
- Ford Brand, 81–82, Canadian politician.
- Vittorio Chierroni, 69, Italian Olympic skier (1936, 1948).
- David Cooper, 54–55, South African psychiatrist.
- Deng Jiaxian, 62, Chinese physicist.
- Nello Falaschi, 73, American NFL football player.
- Philip Holligan, 88, British flying ace.
- Joe Kopcha, 80, American NFL football player.
- Erkki Leikola, 85, Finnish politician.
- Gordon Mills, 51, British songwriter ("It's Not Unusual") and music manager, stomach cancer.
- Werner Pinzner, 39, German contract killer, suicide by gunshot.
- Michael M. Sacher, 68, British business executive.
- Idris Suleymanov, 71, Soviet Azerbaijani soldier.

=== 30 ===
- Idrees Baig, 74–75, Pakistani cricket umpire.
- Stuart Bergsma, 85, American physician and missionary.
- Sir Clarence Bird, 101, British general.
- Câmara Cascudo, 87, Brazilian anthropologist.
- Pina Cipriotto, 75, Italian Olympic gymnast (1936).
- Bill Clark, 60, American drummer.
- James Crockett, 76, American soccer player.
- John N. Dalton, 55, American politician, governor of Virginia (1978–1982), lung cancer.
- Ray Hayes, 80, American NBL basketball player.
- Mickey Heath, 82, American Major League baseball player.
- Bill Jones, 65, Australian rules footballer.
- Alistair Knox, 74, Australian architect.
- Konstantine Lortkipanidze, 81, Soviet Georgian writer.
- William Saunders, 71, American jockey, cancer.
- Lou Sino, 55, American trombonist.
- Gaffney Smith, 81–82, American football player.
- Alfred Wilcox, 66, English cricketer.

=== 31 ===
- Mac Aldrich, 85, American football player.
- John Anderson, 42, American racing driver, traffic collision.
- Enric Casals, 94, Spanish musician.
- Lea Davidova-Medene, 65, Soviet Latvian sculptor.
- Henri Elby, 67, French politician.
- Stanley Ellin, 69, American writer.
- John C. Houlihan, 75, American politician.
- Iustin, 76, Romanian Orthodox prelate, patriarch (since 1977).
- Diana King, 67, English actress, cancer.
- Bill Loika, 64, American football coach, cancer.
- Chiune Sugihara, 86, Japanese diplomat and humanitarian.
- Philippe Valois, 79, Canadian politician, member of the House of Commons of Canada (1949-1958).
- Ludwig Wessely, 82, Austrian Olympic hurdler (1928).
- Teddy Wilson, 73, American pianist, stomach cancer.
- Harold Woolley, Baron Woolley, 81, British unionist and life peer.
