= Kolanowski =

Kolanowski is a Polish surname. Notable people with the surname include:

- Ann Kolanowski, American nurse
- Edmund Kolanowski (1947–1986), Polish serial killer
- Włodzimierz Kolanowski (1913–1944), Polish airman

== See also ==
- Kołakowski
