= Bergsma =

Bergsma is a toponymic surname of West Frisian origin. People with the name include:

- Alaina Bergsma (b. 1990), American volleyball player
- Bert Bergsma (b. 1955), Netherlands Olympic swimmer
- Deanne Bergsma (b. 1941), South African ballerina
- Han Bergsma (b. 1961), Dutch Olympic sailor
- Heather Bergsma née Richardson (b. 1989), American speed skater
- Jacob Hendrik Bergsma (1838–1915), Dutch Minister of Colonial Affairs 1894–97
- John Bergsma (b. 1971), American Catholic theologian
- Jorrit Bergsma (b. 1986), Dutch speed skater
- Léon Bergsma (b. 1997), Dutch football player
- Stuart Bergsma (1900–1986), American medical missionary
- Titia Bergsma (1786–1821), First Dutch (and Western) woman in Japan in 1817
- William Bergsma (1921–1994), American composer
