= Stan Wootton =

Australian rules footballer

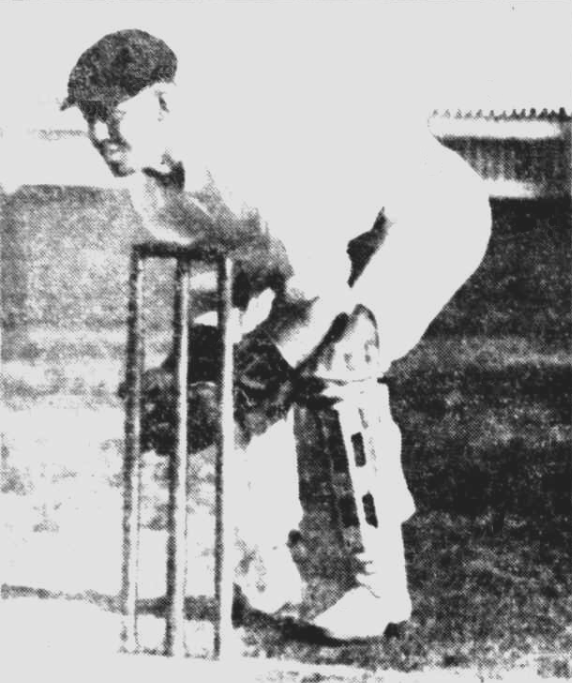

Personal information
- Full name: Stanley Eli Wootton
- Born: 28 April 1895; South Yarra, Victoria
- Died: 20 March 1962 (aged 66); Heidelberg, Victoria
- Original team: Leopold
- Height: 177 cm (5 ft 10 in)
- Weight: 74 kg (163 lb)

Playing career^{1}
| Years | Club | Games (Goals) |
| 1915, 1920–22 | South Melbourne | 41 (45) |
| 1923 | Richmond | 6 (1) |
| Total | | 47 (46) |
- ^{1} Playing statistics correct to the end of 1923.

Stanley Eli Wootton (28 April 1895 – 20 March 1962) was an Australian rules footballer who played with South Melbourne and Richmond in the Victorian Football League (VFL). He also played a first-class cricket match for Victoria.

Recruited from Leopold, Stan Wootton started his VFL career at South Melbourne in 1915 but did not appear again until 1920 due to war commitments. He spent the 1920 season as a forward and topped South Melbourne's goal-kicking with 28 goals, including a career best haul of five against Melbourne at Lake Oval. In 1923 he crossed to Richmond and played six senior games for the club before retiring.

Wootton's cricket career was brief, but very notable as he scored a century in his only first-class innings, against Tasmania at Hobart. A wicket-keeper, he stumped two Tasmanian batsmen before top scoring with 105 runs. As Victoria successfully chased down Tasmania's 4th innings target with five wickets to spare, Wootton wasn't required to bat again and thus finished his career with an average of 105.

A nephew, Richard Wootton, also played for Victoria later in the 1920s.

== See also ==
- List of Victoria first-class cricketers
