= Kenneth Holland =

Kenneth Holland may refer to:

- Kenneth Lamar Holland (1934–2021), former U.S. Representative from South Carolina
- Kenneth Holland (cricketer) (1911–1986), English cricketer
