= Richard Wootton =

Richard Wootton may refer to:

- Richard Wootton (cricketer) (1906–1986), Australian cricketer
- Richard Wootton (racehorse trainer) (1867–1946), Australian racehorse trainer
