= Pasanen =

Pasanen is a Finnish surname. Notable people with the surname include:

- Aukusti Pasanen (1902–1986), Finnish politician
- Spede Pasanen (1930–2001), Finnish film director and producer, comedian, humorist, inventor and TV personality
- Veijo Pasanen (1930–1988), Finnish actor, cousin of Spede Pasanen
- Jari Pasanen (born 1964), Finnish-German professional ice hockey coach
- Petri Pasanen (born 1980), Finnish former footballer
