= Sinai Temple (Springfield, Massachusetts) =

Reform synagogue in Springfield, Massachusetts, US

- Hebrew: סִינַי
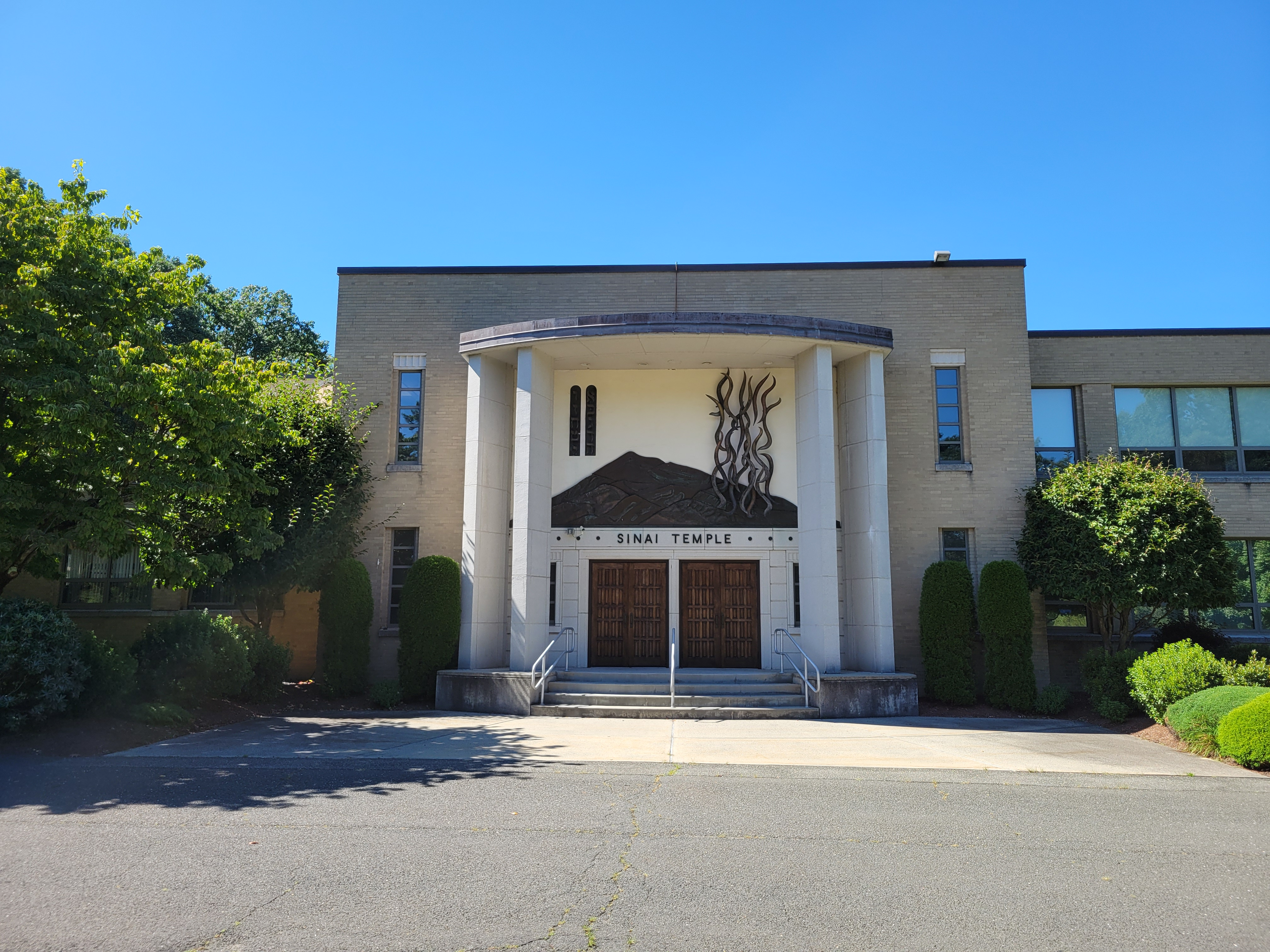

- Location in Massachusetts

Religion
- Affiliation: Reform Judaism
- Ecclesiastical or organizational status: Synagogue
- Leadership: Rabbi Jeremy Master
- Status: Active

Location
- Location: 1100 Dickinson Street, Springfield, Massachusetts
- Country: United States
- Interactive map of Sinai Temple
- Coordinates: 42°04′35″N 72°33′46″W

Architecture
- Type: Synagogue
- Established: 1931 (as a congregation)
- Completed: 1950

Website
- sinaitemple.shulcloud.com

Sinai Temple (Hebrew: סִינַי) is a Reform Jewish synagogue located at 1100 Dickinson Street, in Springfield, Massachusetts, in the United States.

Founded in 1931, Sinai was the first Reform congregation in Springfield. The congregation's first rabbi, David M. Eichhorn, was hired in 1932 and let go just two years later due to financial difficulty brought on by the Great Depression, though he went on to become a prominent American rabbi and authority on interfaith marriage and conversion for the Reform movement.

== History ==
The congregation began meeting at a mansion at 188 Sumner Avenue in Springfield in 1932, which was used as a synagogue until the late 1940s. In 1949 Sinai broke ground on a new location at 1100 Dickinson Street, near the Longmeadow border, which was completed in 1950.

Notably, Sinai has had two long-tenured rabbis: Herman E. Snyder (1947–1970) and Mark D. Shapiro (1988–2016). Membership grew from 50 to 500 families under Rabbi Snyder's leadership. An interfaith leader, he created the Sinai Temple Institute for Christian and Muslim Clergy and Educators, an annual learning session that brings together clergy from the three major religions for a seminar at the Temple.

Rabbi Snyder's successor, Bernard Cohen, was the first rabbi to serve on the faculty of a Roman Catholic college (Saint Mary-of-the-Woods College). His 1970 installation was attended by 100 Catholic and Protestant clergymen.

=== Rabbinical leaders ===
Ordinal	Name	Years	Notes
1	David M. Eichhorn	1932–1934	
2	Judah Cohn	1937-1943	
3	Hershel Levin	1943-1947	
4	Herman E. Snyder	1947–1970	Emeritus: 1970–1992
−	Bernard M. Cohen	1970–1971	interim
5	Stanley Davids	1971–1977	
6	Howard Kaplansky	1977–1983	
−	Jerome S. Gurland	1983	interim
7	Bernard Bloomstone	1983–1988	
8	Mark D. Shapiro	1988–2016	Emeritus: 2016–2020
−	Howard Kosovske	2016–2018	interim
9	Jeremy Master	2018–present	

== Notable members ==
- Eric Lesser, Massachusetts State Senator

== See also ==
- History of the Jews in the United States
