= Prairie Fairies =

2018 book by Valerie Korinek

Prairie Fairies: A History of Queer Communities and People in Western Canada, 1930-1985
- Author: Valerie Korinek
- Language: English
- Subject: Queer history on the Canadian Prairies
- Genre: History of gender and sexuality
- Publisher: University of Toronto Press
- Publication date: May 2018
- Publication place: Canada
- Media type: Print
- Pages: 528
- ISBN: 9780802095312

Prairie Fairies: A History of Queer Communities and People in Western Canada, 1930-1985 is a 2018 book by Valerie Korinek, professor of history at the University of Saskatchewan. The book documents the history of queer people and of gay and lesbian activism on the Canadian Prairies, focusing mainly on the region's five main urban centres of Winnipeg, Regina, Saskatoon, Edmonton, and Calgary.

== Contents ==
The impetus for Prairie Fairies came from Korinek's engagement with the Neil Richards Collection of Sexual and Gender Diversity at the University of Saskatchewan. Richards, a longtime queer activist, donated a large collection of LGBTQ materials to the university, creating one of the largest collections on the topic in a Canadian public archive, which Korinek has called "a huge gift that he had given the province and the university." In addition to extensive archival material, the book also draws on oral history interviews with queer people who lived on the Prairies in the middle of the twentieth century. Korinek spent more than a decade writing the book.

One of the main goals of Prairie Fairies is to demonstrate that queer history in Manitoba, Saskatchewan, and Alberta in the twentieth century was distinctive and influential on the development of queer history throughout Canada. In addition, Korinek worked to show that queer people actively created supportive community spaces on the Prairies throughout this time period. Prairie Fairies maintains a focus on the five largest Prairie urban centres, but also highlights networks between them and between them and rural communities. Beyond providing an overview of this history, the book is animated by stories and anecdotes of individuals, events, and organizations.

The book's time frame covers two distinctive periods in queer history. Korinek labels the pre-1970 era as "pre-gay and lesbian community formation" and the 1970s and onwards as marking the period of gay and lesbian liberation and community formation. Conceptually, Korinek approaches the history with queer perspective in mind, which enables the uncovering of queer histories prior to 1969, when it first became legal to openly identify as queer in Canada. Prairie Fairies is divided into three parts. The first covers that pre-1970 era. The second, covering the years 1970–1985, focuses on the creation of queer communities and spaces. The third part, also covering the years 1970–1985, focuses on queen activism. An important focus of this last part is the way that Prairie activists interacted with and influenced the broader Canadian LGBTQ movement.

Korinek has stated that the fundamental message of the book is that queer people have always been present on the Prairies and active participants in its history: “It was important to write Prairie Fairies so this history was known—outside of the community of individuals who participated in this world, very few knew these histories—and I hope prairie queer people will never be excluded from prairie histories again.”

The cover of the book features a photo of Nan McKay kissing Hope Weir at the University of Saskatchewan campus; both women graduated from the university in 1915. As there were few images, letters, or diaries about prairie lesbians prior to the 1950s, Korinek stated that the photo "claims important space for historians to do more than merely suggest that lesbians existed in the prairies prior to the Second World War."

== Awards ==
Prairie Fairies won two awards from the Canadian Historical Association: its 2019 Clio Prize for the Prairies as the best book on Prairie history, and its 2020 Canadian Committee on Women's and Gender History English Language Book Prize as the best book on women's or gender history. The CHA prize committee wrote that the book "fills a major gap in the field of Canadian women’s and gender history, as well as Canadian history more broadly." Prairie Fairies was also awarded the 2019 Scholarly Writing Award at the Saskatchewan Book Awards. The Canadian Studies Network awarded Prairie Fairies its Prize for the Best Book in Canadian Studies.

== See also ==
- LGBT history in Canada
