= Valerie Korinek =

Canadian historian

- Born: December 11, 1967 (age 58); Toronto, Ontario, Canada

Academic background
- Education: University of Toronto (BA, MA, PhD)
- Thesis: Roughing it in suburbia: reading Chatelaine magazine, 1950-1969 (1996)

Academic work
- Institutions: University of Saskatchewan

Valerie Joyce Korinek (born December 11, 1965) is a Canadian historian. She is a professor of history at the University of Saskatchewan and a Fellow of the Royal Society of Canada. Her research focuses on queer studies and communities.

== Early life and education ==
Korinek was born on December 11, 1965, and grew up in Toronto. Korinek first attended McMaster University for Physical Education, but transferred to the University of Toronto during her first year. Korinek went on to earn a Bachelor of Arts degree in English and History from its Mississauga campus. Korinek spent two years working at a Niagara museum and enrolled in a Master of Arts program at Queen's University; however, Korinek ultimately dropped out to return to the University of Toronto, and went on to complete a PhD in Canadian cultural and gender history there in 1996.

== Career ==
Upon completing her PhD, Korinek joined the faculty at the University of Saskatchewan in 1996. Korinek has stated that she expected to work there for two years and then to move back to Ontario, but she ultimately decided to stay in their history department. She was referred by her colleague to former librarian Neil Richards, read his collection of LGBTQ archives, and became interested in sharing the work. As she began working with Richards on this new project, Korinek published her first book, based on her doctoral dissertation and titled Roughing it in the Suburbs: Reading Chatelaine Magazine in the Fifties and Sixties, through the University of Toronto Press. In 2014, she won the Canadian Historical Association's Prize for Best Article on the History of Sexuality for "'We’re the girls of the pansy parade': Historicizing Winnipeg’s Queer Subcultures, 1930s–1970," published in Histoire sociale/Social History 45 (May 2012).

In 2018, Korinek released her second book, titled Prairie Fairies: A History of Queer Communities and People in Western Canada, 1930-1985, which received the Canadian Historical Association's Clio Prize for the prairie region. The book focuses on the lived experiences of LGBTQ people in Western Canada, especially in the urban centres of Saskatoon, Regina, Winnipeg, Edmonton, and Calgary during the 20th century. While working alongside Richards to conduct research for the book, she came across a photo of Annie Maude "Nan" McKay kissing Hope Weir, which became the cover photo for her book. In addition to archival sources, the book also draws extensively on oral history interviews. The book also won the Canadian Studies Network's Best Book in Canadian Studies Prize and the Canadian Committee on Women's and Gender History's English-Language Book Prize. It was also nominated for two Saskatchewan Book Awards, in the University of Saskatchewan Non-Fiction and Jennifer Welsh Scholarly Writing categories; it was awarded the latter.

Following the publication of Prairie Fairies, Korinek was appointed vice-dean of faculty relations in the University of Saskatchewan College of Arts & Science for a five-year term. In this role, she earned an Insight Grant from the Social Sciences and Humanities Research Council to study the history of same-sex marriage in Canada. In 2020, Korinek was elected a Fellow of the Royal Society of Canada (RSC). She received the RSC's Ursula Franklin Award in Gender Studies in 2026.

== Selected publications ==
- Roughing it in the Suburbs: Reading Chatelaine Magazine in the Fifties and Sixties (2000)
- Prairie Fairies: A History of Queer Communities and People in Western Canada, 1930-1985 (2018)
