= Harry Sacher =

British businessman, journalist and Zionist leader

- Born: 3 September 1881; Shoreditch, London, England
- Died: 10 May 1971 (aged 89); Westminster, England
- Occupations: businessman, journalist, Zionist leader
- Board member of: World Zionist Organization

Harry Sacher (3 September 1881 – 10 May 1971) was a British businessman, journalist, and Zionist leader. He was appointed director of Marks & Spencer in 1932.

== Early life and education ==
Sacher was born in Shoreditch, Middlesex, the fourth of five children of Polish Jews Jacob and Esther Sacher. His father, a tailor, emigrated from Suwałki, Russian Poland. He attended New College, Oxford.

== Career ==
Sacher wrote for The Manchester Guardian as a political analyst.

In Mandatory Palestine, Sacher co-founded the law firm of Sacher, Horowitz & Klebanoff. The firm had offices in Jerusalem and Haifa, as well as a branch in London. Already by the 1920s, Sacher became the most prominent attorney in the country. He was legal adviser to the Palestine Zionist Executive and also counted the Municipality of Tel Aviv among his regular clients. At the same time he was an enthusiast of English law and was among the main opponents of the Hebrew Law of Peace system that aspired for autonomy from Palestine's British-based system of law and courts. His most important private client (and personal confidant) had been Pinhas Rutenberg, who, under his legal guidance, created the Jaffa Electric Company and later the Palestine Electric Company under British concession. Harry Sacher was, therefore, an important figure in the process of providing Palestine with electric energy.

An active Zionist, he was elected to the Executive of the WZO, and worked closely with Chaim Weizmann in their efforts to define and lead the WZO during the 1920s and 1930s, and contributed to early drafts of the Balfour Declaration. He had significant involvement in the establishment of Hebrew University of Jerusalem.

Sacher married Miriam Marks, the sister of Simon Marks in 1915. He subsequently joined Marks & Spencer, and was made director in 1932.

== Death and legacy ==
Sacher died in Westminster in 1971. He was survived by his wife, Miriam, and their sons, Michael M. Sacher, and Gabriel Sacher.

Sacher Park, the largest park in Jerusalem, was a gift from Harry and Miriam Sacher. One of his gifts also enabled publication in 1957 of the final volume of the archaeological reports from the site of Samaria, which had been excavated in the early 1930s as a joint effort by Harvard University, the Hebrew University in Jerusalem, the Palestine Exploration Fund, the British Academy, and the British School of Archaeology in Jerusalem.

== Books ==
- Zionism and the Jewish future. Macmillan Company. 1916 online
- Jewish emancipation. English Zionist Federation. 1917 online
- Israel.the establishment of a state. British Book Centre. 1952, Hyperion. 1976
- Israel, the Arabs and the Foreign Office, Zionist Federation of Great Britain and Ireland, 1956
- Zionist portraits, and other essays. Blond. 1959
