= Kołakowski =

Kołakowski (feminine: Kołakowska) is a Polish-language surname. Emigrants with this surname may have also been recorded as Kolakoski, Kolakosky, Kollakowski, Kulakowski, Kolackovsky, Kolakowsky, Colakovski, Kollakowsky and Cholakovski. When transliterated via Russian (Poland was parth of the Russian Empire), the surname may have the forms Kolakovsky, Kolakovski (feminine: Kolakovskaya).

Notable people with this surname include:

- Lech Kołakowski (born 1963), Polish politician
- Leszek Kołakowski (1927–2009), Polish philosopher and historian of ideas
- Robert Kołakowski (born 1963), Polish politician
- Victoria Kolakowski (born 1961), American lawyer
- Zofia Kołakowska, Polish athlete
- Agnieszka Kołakowska (born 1960), Polish philosopher, philologist, translator and essayist
- William Kolakoski (1944–1997), American artist and recreational mathematician
- Alfred Kolakovsky (1906–1977), Russian botanist and paleobotanist
