= John Bergsma =

American Catholic theologian (1971-)

- Born: United States
- Occupation: Professor of Theology
- Website: www.johnbergsma.com

John Bergsma is an American Catholic scholar.

== Career ==
Bergsma serves as a professor of theology at Franciscan University of Steubenville, in Steubenville, Ohio. He holds a Master of Theology degree from Calvin Theological Seminary in Grand Rapids, Michigan. He also holds a doctorate of philosophy in theology from the University of Notre Dame. His specialized study is that of the Old Testament and the Dead Sea Scrolls. He grew up as a Calvinist and served as a Protestant pastor for four years before converting to Catholicism in 2001.

Bergsma's study of ancient scripture and the Dead Sea Scrolls have spawned multiple articles and publications, including his book The Jubilee from Leviticus to Qumran: A History of Interpretation. He has written several scholarly articles, some of which were co-authored by Catholic apologist and theologian Dr. Scott Hahn. Additionally, Bergsma has taken part in several seminars and discussions, including the Enoch seminar and that of the Jubilee. Bergsma routinely participates in lectures on his studies, and has contributed to media productions distributed by Lighthouse Catholic Media. With regard to the discovery and study of the Dead Sea Scrolls, his focus often includes how the scrolls reaffirm Catholic doctrine, tradition, and practices.

== Books ==
- The Jubilee from Leviticus to Qumran: A History of Interpretation. Vetus Testamentum Supplements. Vol. 115. Leiden: Brill Academic Publishers. 2007. ISBN 9789004152991.
- Bible Basics For Catholics: A New Picture of Salvation History. Ave Maria Press. 2012. ISBN 9781594712913.
- New Testament Basics for Catholics. Ave Maria Press. 2015. ISBN 9781594715822.
- Stunned by Scripture: How the Bible Brought Me Home. Our Sunday Visitor. 2017. ISBN 9781612783932.
- Psalm Basics for Catholics: Seeing Salvation History in a New Way. Ave Maria Press 2018. ISBN 1594717931.
- With Brant Pitre A Catholic Introduction to the Bible: The Old Testament. Ignatius Press, 2018. ISBN 1586177222.
- Jesus and the Dead Sea Scrolls: Revealing the Jewish Roots of Christianity. Image. 2019. ISBN 1984823124.
- With Jeffrey L. Morrow. Murmuring Against Moses: The Contentious History and Contested Future of Pentateuchal Studies. Steubenville: Emmaus Academic. 2023. ISBN 9781645851493.
