= Krum Penev =

Bulgarian poet, playwright, and translator (1901–1986)

Krum Todorov Penev
- Крум Тодоров Пенев
- Born: 31 December 1901; Sofia, Bulgaria
- Died: 12 July 1986 (aged 84)
- Political party: BCP
- Awards: Dimitrov Prize (1950); Honored Cultural Personality (1965); People's Cultural Personality (1975)

Krum Penev (31 December 1901 – 12 July 1986) was a Bulgarian poet, playwright, and translator. He was born to a volunteer from Shipka.

In 1920, he graduated from high school in Sofia. After graduating, he studied drama in Turin, Italy, from 1921 until 1923.

After studying in Turin, he then returned to Bulgaria, in which he had been a member of the Bulgarian Communist Party since its founding in 1919. He then becomes the editor of the newspaper "Vedrina" from 1935 until 1936, a legal publication of the Bulgarian Communist Party.

During World War II, due to their allegiance with the Bulgarian Communist Party, he was sent to the Krastopole concentration camp for 2 years, from 1941 until 1943.

After Bulgaria joined the Allies in World War II, he was released from the concentration camp, and worked at the Ministry of Information from 1944 until 1945). He was also a playwright at the State Music Theater in 1946, and the People's Army Theater in Sofia in 1947.

He was a member of the Union of Bulgarian Writers (Съюз на българските писатели).
