= Ann Kolanowski =

American nurse

Ann Marie Kolanowski is an American nurse.

She earned a bachelor's degree in nursing from College Misericordia, followed by a master's degree at Pennsylvania State University and a doctorate from New York University. Kolanowski began teaching at Mercy Hospital and subsequently Luzerne County Community College prior to taking a tenured position at Wilkes College. She then joined the Medical College of Georgia faculty and later returned to Penn State, where she was appointed Elouise Ross Eberly Professor of Nursing in 2007.
