= Robert Kołakowski =

Polish politician

Member of the Sejm
- Incumbent
- Assumed office 25 September 2005
- Constituency: 16 – Płock

Personal details
- Born: 15 March 1963 (age 63)
- Party: Law and Justice

Robert Jerzy Kołakowski (born 15 March 1963 in Ciechanów) is a Polish politician. He was elected to the Sejm on 25 September 2005, getting 5,335 votes in 16 Płock district as a candidate from the Law and Justice list.

== See also ==
- Members of Polish Sejm 2005-2007
