= Alfred Grimwood =

English cricketer

Alfred Grimwood (8 September 1905 – 2 July 1986) was an English cricketer. He was a left-handed batsman and a left-arm slow bowler who played for Essex. He was born in Walthamstow and died in Chingford.

Grimwood made four appearances for Essex during the 1925 season, his debut coming against Sussex in May. Grimwood's debut was somewhat contrasting, with him scoring a duck in the first innings but a career-best 15 in the second. Grimwood remained in and around the lower order for the rest of his short career.
