= Tom MacKay =

Australian rules footballer, born 1911

Personal information
- Full name: Tom MacKay
- Born: 8 March 1911
- Died: 17 July 1986 (aged 75)

Playing career^{1}
Years	Club	Games (Goals)
1932, 1935	Geelong	9 (11)
- ^{1} Playing statistics correct to the end of 1935.

Tom MacKay (8 March 1911 – 17 July 1986) was an Australian rules footballer who played with Geelong in the Victorian Football League (VFL).
