= Anthony Hadingham =

English cricketer

Anthony Wallace Gwynne Hadingham (1 March 1913 – 14 July 1986) was an English first-class cricketer active 1931–33 who played for Surrey. He was born in Menton, France; died in Natal, South Africa.
