= Michael M. Sacher =

Michael M. Sacher

Michael Moses Sacher FRPSL (17 October 1917 – 29 July 1986) was a senior executive at Marks & Spencer including holding the positions of joint managing director and joint vice-chairman. He was closely associated with Jewish causes throughout his life and in his spare time was a noted postal historian of Palestine and a fellow of the Royal Philatelic Society London.

== Early life and family ==
Michael Sacher was born in Manchester on 17 October 1917, the eldest son of the prominent British Zionist Harry Sacher and his wife Miriam.

He was educated in Palestine from the age of four when his family moved there and at St Paul's School, London, from 1930 from where he went up to New College, University of Oxford, graduating with a degree in Politics, Philosophy, and Economics.

He married Audrey Doreen Glucksman, born Johannesburg, South Africa, in Paddington in 1938. They had three sons and two daughters. Audrey died in 1984 and Sacher married Janice Puddephatt in 1986.

== Career ==
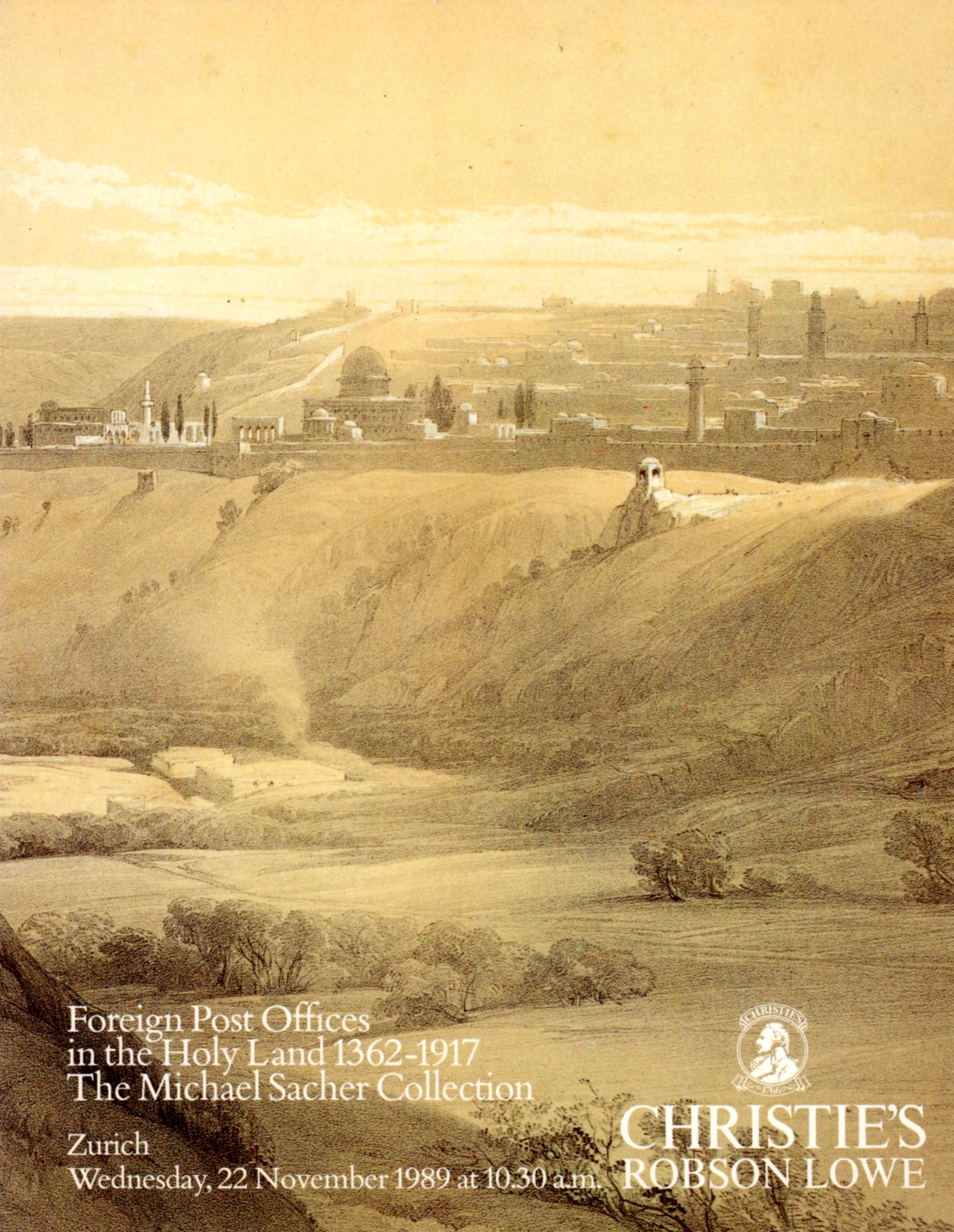
Foreign Post Offices in the Holy Land 1362-1917 The Michael Sacher Collection. Cover of the 1989 auction catalogue.

Sacher worked for Marks & Spencer from 1938 to 1939 before joining the Royal Army Service Corps where he saw action during the Second World War in the western desert. He graduated from the Haifa staff college in 1943 with the rank of major. He was a liaison officer to General Leclerc and served with the Free French in north Africa and with the Allies in Italy.

After the war he returned to Marks & Spencer where he held various positions including joint managing director 1971 to 1983, vice-chairman from 1972 to 1982, and joint vice-chairman from 1982 to 1984. He was a trustee of the National Gallery from 1982, and a governor of the Hebrew University of Jerusalem.

== Philately ==
Sacher specialised in the postal history of Palestine and the surrounding areas, writing or co-writing several books on the subject. He was a fellow of the Royal Philatelic Society London but did not enter his collection in competition. It was sold after his death by Christie's-Robson Lowe in Zurich in 1989 in over 400 lots.

== Death and legacy ==
Sacher died in London on 29 July 1986. An anthology of his philatelic writings was published posthumous by the Royal Philatelic Society London in 1995.

== Selected publications ==
- Army and Field Post Offices of Egypt and the EEF, 1914-20, Supplement to The London Philatelist, London, 1970.
- Government 'Certified Official' & Post Office cachets of British Mandate of Palestine. British Association of Palestine-Israel Philatelists, 1981.
- The Postmarks and other Markings of Mandate Jerusalem (1917–1948). Zeʹev Galibov, London, 1982. (With E. Glassman)
- Schneider, Jeffrey. (Ed.) The Postal Markings of Mandate Palestine 1917–48; Edited and revised from the collected works of Michael Sacher. Royal Philatelic Society, London, 1995. ISBN 0900631309
