= Nan McKay =

Canadian Métis librarian (1892–1986)

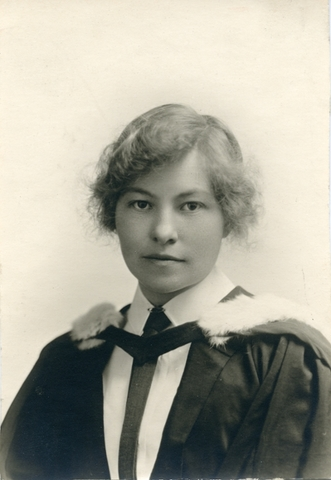
- Born: Annie Maude McKay; October 10, 1892; Fort à la Corne, Saskatchewan
- Died: July 27, 1986 (aged 93); Saskatoon, Saskatchewan, Canada
- Education: University of Saskatchewan
- Occupation: Librarian
- Relatives: James McKay (uncle)

Annie Maude "Nan" McKay (October 10, 1892 – July 27, 1986) was a Métis librarian. In 1915, she became the first Indigenous woman to graduate the University of Saskatchewan. McKay worked as a librarian at the university for 44 years.

== Early life and education ==
Annie Maude McKay was born into a prominent English Métis family on October 10, 1892, at Fort à la Corne. Her father, Angus McKay (born 1858), worked for the Hudson's Bay Company (HBC), which had a trading post at Fort à la Corne. Her mother, Annie Maud Mary Fortescue McKay, was born in 1867, and her father also worked for the HBC. Nan's mother died in 1907 following an operation for appendicitis; her father remarried in 1910. The family moved frequently within Saskatchewan because of Angus's reassignments, including to Green Lake in 1899, Île-à-la-Crosse in 1907, and La Ronge in 1909.

Nan and her siblings were homeschooled as children. After her mother's death, her uncle, judge and House of Commons member James McKay, enrolled her and her sister at St. Alban's Ladies College, a distinguished Anglican private school in Prince Albert. She was awarded a $200 entrance scholarship to the University of Saskatchewan and used her mother's inheritance to pay tuition at the university.

She was active in extracurricular activities at the university, including serving on the student council as well as the board of the school's group for female students, Penta Kai Deka. She was the staff artist of The Sheaf, the school's student-run newspaper. McKay was a figure skater and played for the university's varsity ice hockey team as a student, continuing to play on the university's teams well into the 1920s as an alumni member.

When she graduated with Honours in English and French in 1915, she was the school's first female Aboriginal and Métis graduate.

== Career at the University of Saskatchewan ==
Shortly after her graduation in 1915, McKay was hired into a temporary position as assistant librarian at the University of Saskatchewan Library. She would remain employed at the library until her retirement in 1959. With little formal training in librarianship, McKay learned primarily on the job. She served as a "right-hand man" for a series of male university librarians throughout her career.

With many students serving overseas during World War I, McKay and another recent alumnus were appointed editors of The Sheaf. As editors they gauged interest in forming an alumni association and in 1917 founded the University of Saskatchewan Graduates' Association, of which McKay was elected to the position of secretary-treasurer. McKay also served as a volunteer nurse at the university during the 1918 influenza pandemic.

== Death and legacy ==
After her retirement, McKay spent time gardening and reading. McKay died in Saskatoon on July 27, 1986, at the age of 93.

In 2007, she was named one of the University of Saskatchewan's "100 Alumni of Influence." As part of the university's centennial commemorations, a photo collection was reviewed and a 1915 photo of McKay and fellow student Hope Weir embracing and kissing was discovered. Scholars such as Valerie Korinek have discussed the photo, and McKay's life and friendships in general, as evidence of early queer community at the university. The photo of McKay and Weir became the cover for Korinek's award-winning 2018 book Prairie Fairies: A History of Queer Communities and People in Western Canada, 1930-1985.
