= David Max Eichhorn =

American rabbi

Rabbi David Max Eichhorn
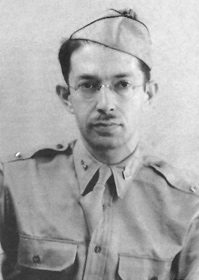
- Chaplain David Max Eichhorn, Camp Croft, Spartanburg County, South Carolina, 1942
- Born: January 6, 1906; Columbia, Pennsylvania, US
- Died: July 16, 1986 (aged 80); Melbourne, Florida, US
- Occupation: Reform Jewish Rabbi
- Known for: United States Army chaplain, author, rabbi, Jewish education

David Max Eichhorn (January 6, 1906 – July 16, 1986) was an American rabbi of Reform Judaism, a director for Hillel, a chaplain in the Army, an author, and an authority within Reform Judaism on the subjects of interfaith marriage and religious conversion.

== Biography ==
David Max Eichhorn was born in Columbia, Pennsylvania, on January 6, 1906, the son of Joseph and Anna Eichhorn. He attended the Temple Shaarai Shomayim religious school in Lancaster, Pennsylvania, was confirmed there in 1921, and graduated from Columbia High School in 1923. He enrolled at Hebrew Union College in 1924. He graduated, and was ordained as a rabbi in 1931.

Eichhorn served as the first rabbi of Sinai Temple in Springfield, Massachusetts, from 1932 to 1934, and was the rabbi at Sinai Temple in Texarkana, Arkansas, from 1935 to 1938. In 1938, he received the degree of Doctor of Divinity from Hebrew Union College-Jewish Institute of Religion. Eichhorn was the first rabbi of Temple Israel in Tallahassee, Florida, from 1939 to 1942. He was also the first director for Hillel in the state of Florida at the University of Florida in Gainesville and Florida State College for Women in Tallahassee.

In 1941, Eichhorn enlisted in the Army as a chaplain. In July 1942, Eichhorn was stationed at Camp Croft in Spartanburg County, SC and evidently assisted the local Jewish congregation, which was then without a rabbi. Throughout World War II, Eichhorn was assigned to serve in combat units in France and Germany, and was among the troops that liberated Dachau.

After returning from the war in 1945, Eichhorn retained his active military status in the United States Army Reserve. He worked for the Committee on Army and Navy Religious Activities (known later as the Commission on Jewish Chaplaincy) of the National Jewish Welfare Board as Director of Field Operations of the federal chaplaincy program. The Board is authorized by the Government to serve the religious needs of Jewish military personnel. He was also the president of the Association of Jewish Chaplains of the Armed Forces from 1953 to 1955. He retired from the military with the rank of lieutenant colonel in 1968. Temple Israel was founded in about 1965 or 1966. It met in a church in Cocoa Beach, Florida, until a permanent home was found. Land was purchased on Merritt Island, Florida. The congregation moved to their new home in 1970. Rabbi Eichhorn served as a part-time rabbi to Temple Israel along with student rabbis starting in 1966. He officiated over the congregation's first Confirmation class ceremony June 16, 1967.

He resigned from the National Jewish Welfare Board in 1970.

Eichhorn lived in Satellite Beach, Florida and wrote a number of books. He was known primarily for research in the areas of interfaith marriage and religious conversion.

Eichhorn died on July 16, 1986, of a heart attack at Holmes Regional Medical Center in Melbourne, Florida.

== Selected bibliography ==
- Cain: son of the serpent: A midrash or homiletical narration of the fourth chapter of the book of Genesis (1957) ASIN B0007DPULO
- Musings of the Old Professor: The meaning of Koheles (1963) ISBN 978-0-8246-0479-0
- Conversion to Judaism: A History and Analysis (1965) David Max Eichhorn, ed. ASIN B000H0SM1W
- Jewish intermarriages: Fact and fiction (1974) ASIN B0006W2D9I
- Evangelizing the American Jew: An account of Christian attempts to convert the Jews of the United States and Canada (1976) ASIN B0007ASIIE
- Joys of Jewish Folklore (1981) ISBN 978-0-8246-0233-8
- Hagar and Ishmael: A study in Arab-Jewish relations (1985) ASIN B0006YTTWK
- The GI's rabbi: World War II letters of David Max Eichhorn (2004) David Max Eichhorn; Greg Palmer, Mark S. Zaid eds. ISBN 978-0-7006-1356-4
