= Richard Lowe (cricketer, born 1904) =

English sportsman (1904–1986)

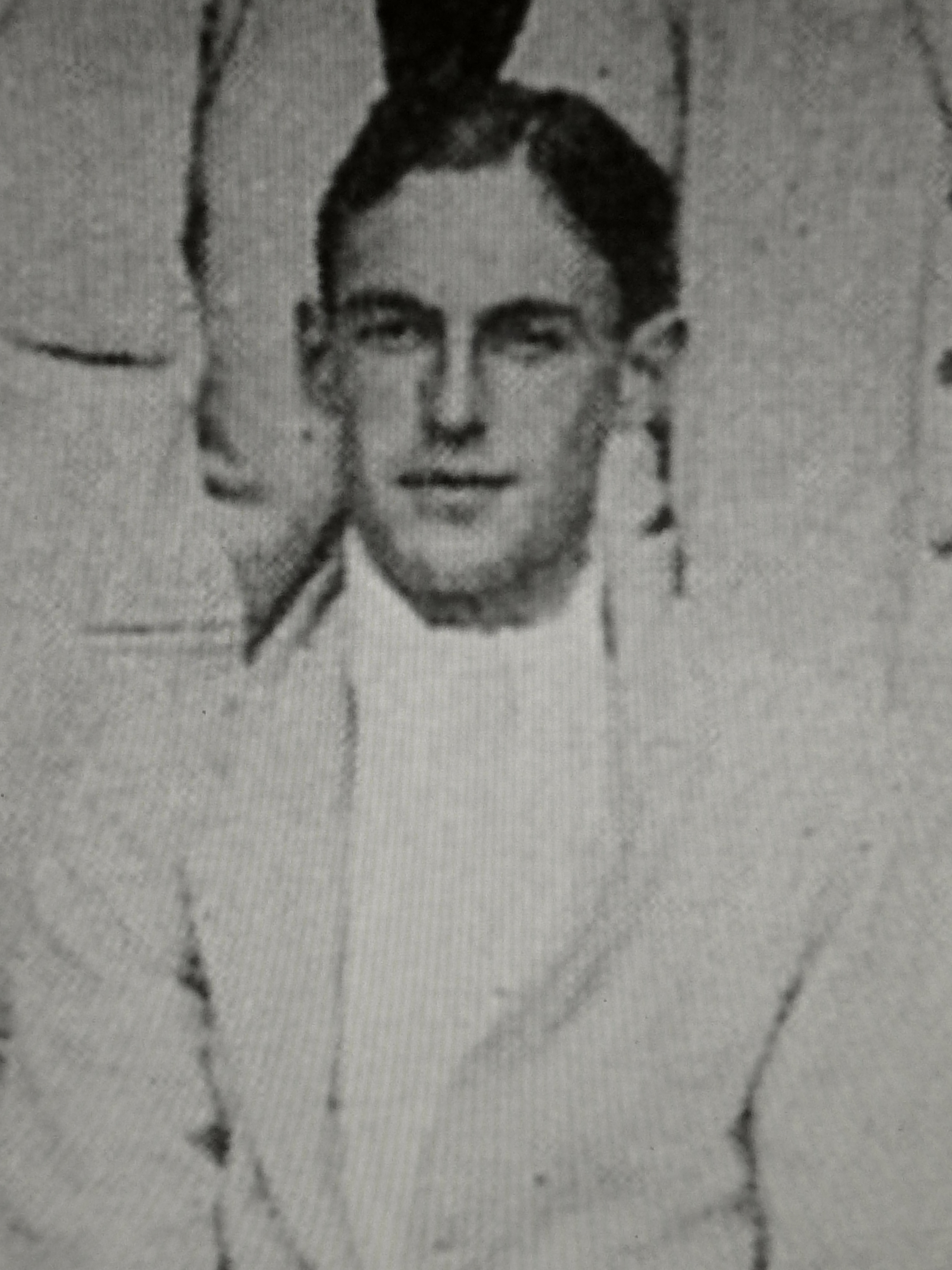
- Lowe pictured before the 1925 University Match

Personal information
- Full name: Richard Geoffrey Harvey Lowe
- Born: 11 June 1904; Wimbledon, Surrey
- Died: 5 July 1986 (aged 82); Tunbridge Wells, Kent
- Batting: Left-handed
- Bowling: Right-arm fast-medium

Domestic team information
- Years: Team
- 1925–1927: Cambridge Univ.
- 1926: Kent
- FC debut: 20 May 1925 Cambridge Univ. v Leicestershire
- Last FC: 4 July 1927 Cambridge Univ. v Oxford Univ.

Career statistics
Competition	First-class
Matches	33
Runs scored	697
Batting average	18.83
100s/50s	0/2
Top score	83
Balls bowled	3,869 (Note: CricInfo and CricketArchive differ in the number of deliveries Lowe bowled, CricketArchive identifying 3,874.)
Wickets	70
Bowling average	26.24
5 wickets in innings	3
10 wickets in match	0
Best bowling	5/22 (Note: Innings figures of 5/22 are quoted in Lowe's Wisden obituary and on scorecards for the 1926 Varsity Match. CricInfo quotes 5/31, Lowe's previous best bowling figures.)
Catches/stumpings	16/–
- Source: CricInfo, 5 June 2018

Richard Geoffrey Harvey Lowe (11 June 1904 – 5 July 1986) was an English amateur sportsman who played first-class cricket and association football for Cambridge University during the 1920s. Lowe made one appearance for the England amateur football team, took a hat-trick bowling in the 1926 University Match and became a teacher after leaving university.

== Early life ==
Lowe was born at Wimbledon in what was then Surrey in 1904. The son of Lionel and Florence Lowe, his father worked in the civil service and Lowe was educated at Westminster School. At school he played for the cricket XI for four years, captaining the team in his final year. He played for 'The Rest' in 1922 against the Lord's Schools and for the Public Schools against the Army in both 1922 and 1923. He was considered one of the better schoolboy bowlers who could "swing the ball quite late" and one of the best all-rounders, being described as a "brilliant rather than sound" batsman. In his final year at Westminster he scored 668 runs at an average of 51 and took 51 wickets with his "distinctly pacey" bowling.

== Sporting career ==
After going up to Cambridge, Lowe played football for Cambridge University AFC for all four years he was a student. He captained the team and played one amateur international match for England in December 1926 (Note: Lowe's Wisden obituary gives the date as 1924. McColl et al. in their authoritative work on British amateur international football give the date, correctly, as 18 December 1926. This is the date as reported in the contemporary match report in The Times.) at Filbert Street against Scotland, although his performance in the match was judged to be timid and he was considered to have done "little or nothing" on the left-wing and had been unable to "rise to the occasion".

He was unable to play any cricket in 1924 due to injury, but played in each of his three remaining seasons, winning Blues in all three. His first-class cricket debut came in May 1925 against Leicestershire at Fenner's and he went on to make 31 first-class appearances for the university, including playing against the touring Australians in 1926 and the New Zealanders in 1927. In the 1926 University Match he took a hat-trick and recorded his best bowling figures of 5/22 in Oxford's first innings.

During July 1926 Lowe appeared twice for Kent County Cricket Club at Maidstone, the only first-class county cricket appearances of his career. He had played once for Kent's Second XI in the Minor Counties Championship in 1923 and played two more matches for the Second XI in 1928. Although he was restricted by ill health, Lowe played club cricket occasionally for Band of Brothers and stood regularly as an umpire.

== Later life ==
Lowe initially worked as a stockbroker, but spent most of his working life as a teacher; between 1935 and 1954 he was headteacher of Parkfield prep school at Heathfield in Sussex. He remained in contact with cricket throughout his life and was a force behind the organisation of Band of Brothers, a cricket club closely associated with Kent, during Canterbury Cricket Week. He married Joan Lewis in 1929 and died at Tunbridge Wells in Kent in July 1986 aged 82.

== Bibliography ==
- Carlaw, Derek (2020). Kent County Cricketers, A to Z: Part Two (1919–1939) (PDF). Cardiff: ACS.
