= Margarita Argúas =

Argentinian lawyer (1902–1986)

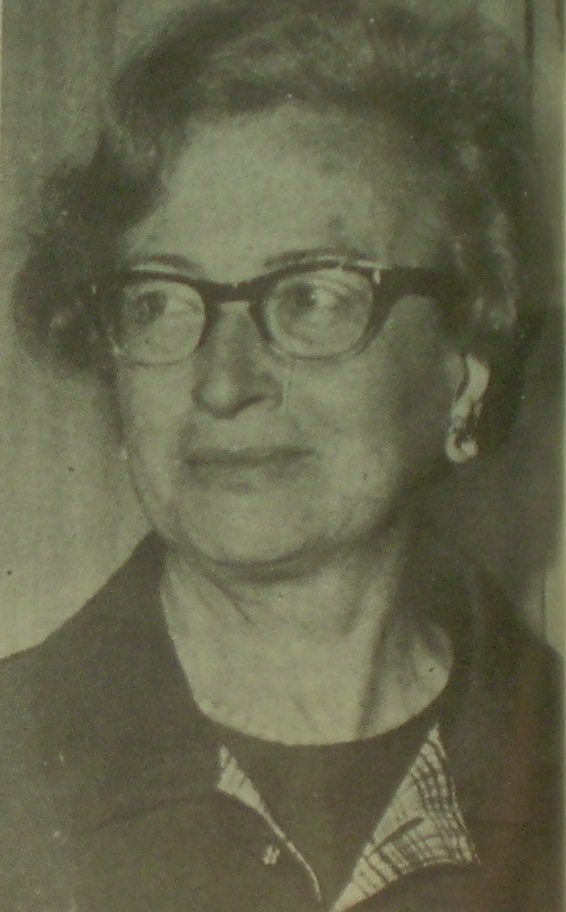
- Born: Margarita Argúas Royol; 29 October 1902; Buenos Aires, Argentina
- Died: 27 July 1986 (aged 83); Buenos Aires, Argentina
- Occupations: professor, lawyer, jurist

Margarita Argúas (29 October 1902 – 27 July 1986) was an Argentine lawyer who pioneered participation of women into the legal profession. She was the first woman to hold a chair in the law faculty at the University of Buenos Aires, first woman to be appointed to the National Academy of Law and Social Sciences, as well as the first woman to serve on the Argentine Supreme Court of Justice of the Nation. Internationally, she was the first woman to become president of the International Law Association, serving from 1968 to 1970 and was a member of the Permanent Court of Arbitration in The Hague between 1977 and 1983. She was posthumously honored with a Konex Foundation award in 1986 for her work in Civil and International Law.

== Early life ==
Margarita Argúas Royol was born on 29 October 1902 in Buenos Aires, Argentina to Margarita Royol and Domingo Argúas. After completing her secondary studies, she enrolled in the law faculty at the University of Buenos Aires in 1923, graduating with honors in 1925. She continued with her studies, earning a doctorate with the thesis La regla locus regit actum, en la legislación civil y la jurisprudencia argentina (The rule of Locus regit actum (locality governs legal interpretation) in civil legislation and Argentine jurisprudence) in 1926. She received the Premio Accésit for her thesis, which was published in 1928.

== Career ==
In 1926, Argúas became the first woman to teach private international law at the University of Buenos Aires and was the first woman appointed to the Carlos Vico Chair in the law faculty. That same year, she published Tratado de Derecho Internacional Privado (Treaty on Private International Law), which set forth the idea that in international treaties, the intent of the parties as understood in their jurisdiction was an important consideration for contractual and commercial law. By 1933, she was elevated to an assistant professorship and was granted a designation allowing her to stand in for Professor Carlos M. Vico in his private law lectures. Between 1939 and 1940, she served as the Advisory Secretary to the Second Congress of Montevideo. The Congress, revised the 1889 treaties between Argentina, Bolivia, Paraguay, Peru, and Uruguay regarding international legal matters, covering a wide array of topics including commercial law, intellectual property, navigation, penal reforms, political asylum and various reciprocity specifications for banking, educational and professional rankings. After ten years of teaching, in 1943, Argúas tendered her resignation in response to the mass dismissal of university professors by the Ramírez regime.

In 1945, the university attempted to reinstate her, but Argúas refused, stating, "...después de haber meditado detenidamente en la posición adoptada, me he reafirmado en ella, considerando que mientras la Nación no recupere el libre juego de sus instituciones fundamentales y no haya entrado en la normalidad jurídica, por las únicas vías legítimas que la Constitución le fija, yo no podría, sin faltar a mi compromiso ya lo que creo es mi deber, reintegrarme a la cátedra de Derecho Internacional Privado, que dictaba en esa Facultad..." (Having meditated carefully on the position taken, I have reaffirmed myself in it, considering that as long as the nation does not regain the freedom of action of its fundamental institutions and has not entered into legal normality, by the only legitimate means fixed in the Constitution, I could not, without failing in my commitment and what I believe is my duty, reinstate myself as the chair of private international law, from which I taught in the faculty.) The law school tried again to lure her back in 1946 and though she returned in March, she resigned again in November, protesting that the Farrell and Perón governments were also not constitutionally compliant.

Argúas moved to Paris in 1947 and attended the international law courses taught by Jean-Paulin Niboyet at the University of Paris. At Niboyet's invitation, she delivered lectures on Argentine law. In December 1955, when the Ministry of Education agreed to reinstate the professors who had been dismissed or resigned under the previous political climate and granted the university its autonomy, Argúas returned as the Carlos Vico Chair. The following year, she was recognized with an Order of Merit in the second degree for her expertise in international private law. At various times over the next decade, she replaced Vico as the director in charge, while serving as his Deputy Director. Simultaneously, she represented Argentina as a delegate at numerous international conferences, including the 11th Pan American Women's Association Congress, held in 1956 in Santo Domingo; the Congress of Jurisconsults, hosted in Jerusalem in 1958; and the 5th International Congress of Comparative Law, held in Brussels in 1958, among others. In 1966, she was made a full professor, becoming the first woman to teach as a titular professor at the University of Buenos Aires.

In 1968, Argúas became the first woman appointed to the Argentine National Academy of Law and Social Sciences and that same year was elected as the first woman to serve as president of the International Law Association. After serving her two-year term as president, she later served as vice president from 1974 to 1975 and was the president of the Argentine chapter until her death. On 7 October 1970, Argúas was appointed by de facto President Roberto M. Levingston to the Argentine Supreme Court, to fill the remaining term of José Bidau, who had died in office. (Note: Though it is sometimes claimed that Argúas was the first woman to serve on a Supreme Court in the Americas, she was appointed almost a decade after María Cristina Salmorán de Tamayo. Salmorán was named to the Mexican Supreme Court in 1961.) With her appointment, Argúas became the first Argentine woman to serve on the nation's highest court and continued in the capacity until 24 May 1973. She was recognized by the Mexican National Council for Women's Rights in 1971, with the "Lady of the Americas" award. Between 1977 and 1983, Argúas served as a member of the Permanent Court of Arbitration in The Hague. She was awarded the Silver Clover of Rotary International in 1980 for her career in international justice.

== Death and legacy ==
Argúas died in Buenos Aires on 27 July 1986 having never married and without children. That same year, she was posthumously honored with a Konex Award for her career achievements. She is remembered for her pioneering work in private international law, and work to promote understanding of how local customs effected international commercial and contractual agreements. In 2017, the University of Buenos Aires hosted a seminar in remembrance of her contributions to Argentine jurisprudence.
