= Henry Bridges (musician) =

American jazz musician

Henry Bridges, Jr. (December 2, 1915, Paris, Texas – July 27, 1986, Los Angeles) was an American jazz saxophonist.

Earlier jazz reference books speculated that he was born in Oklahoma City circa 1908, but later work examining social security records indicates that he was probably born in 1915 in Texas. While living in Oklahoma he worked with Don Byas and with Charlie Christian for several years in territory bands, then worked in the bands of Alphonso Trent, Anna Mae Winburn, and Leslie Sheffield. Late in 1939 he joined Harlan Leonard's band and recorded with him, remaining with Leonard until 1941. Shortly after this he joined the US military and led a band which performed in the US and the European theater. After the war he settled in Los Angeles, performing until about 1960, including with Julia Lee (1946), Clifford Blivens (1949), Peppy Prince, Helen Humes, and Damita Jo.
