= Idris Suleymanov =

Azerbaijani Red Army lieutenant (1915–1986)

Idris Hasan oglu Suleymanov
- İdris Həsən oğlu Süleymanov
- Born: 12 February 1915; Goranboy, Elisabethpol Governorate, Russian Empire
- Died: 29 July 1986 (aged 71); Baku, Azerbaijan SSR, Soviet Union
- Military career
- Allegiance: Soviet Union
- Branch: Red Army
- Service years: 1936–1939; 1941–1946
- Rank: Lieutenant
- Unit: 43rd Separate Rifle Brigade
- Conflicts: World War II; Battle of the Caucasus
- Awards: Hero of the Soviet Union

Idris Hasan oglu Suleymanov (Azerbaijani: İdris Həsən oğlu Süleymanov; 12 February 1915 – 29 July 1986) was an Azerbaijani Red Army Lieutenant and Hero of the Soviet Union. During the Battle of the Caucasus near Mozdok in November 1942, he led the 1st Rifle Platoon of the 1st Separate Rifle Battalion in the 43rd Separate Rifle Brigade. He reportedly launched a counterattack and was wounded in the eye and leg but did not leave the front line. Suleymanov was awarded the title Hero of the Soviet Union on 13 December 1942. He retired postwar and worked at the local social security department.

== Early life ==
Suleymanov was born on 12 February 1915 in Goranboy to a peasant family. He graduated from 10th grade and worked as a secretary of the People's Court. He was drafted into the Red Army in 1936 and graduated from the reserve commander improvement courses in 1939, after which he transferred to the reserve.

== World War II ==
Suleymanov was drafted into the Red Army again in July 1941. He fought in combat from that time. He became commander of the 1st Rifle Platoon of the 1st Separate Rifle Battalion in the 43rd Separate Rifle Brigade with the rank of Junior Lieutenant. In November 1942, in the area of the village of Ishcherskaya, Suleymanov led his platoon in a counterattack and repulsed the German troops. Despite being wounded in the eye and leg, he reportedly did not leave the battlefield. On 13 December 1942 he was awarded the title Hero of the Soviet Union and the Order of Lenin. In 1943, Suleymanov joined the Communist Party of the Soviet Union.

== Postwar ==
Suleymanov retired in 1946 with the rank of Lieutenant. Until 1969, he worked in the Kasum-Ismailovsky Raion Social Security Department. He lived in Baku. On 6 April 1985 he received the Order of the Patriotic War 1st class on the 40th anniversary of the end of World War II. Suleymanov died on 29 July 1986.
