= Bill Clark (musician) =

American jazz drummer

- Birth name: William E. Clark
- Born: July 31, 1925; Jonesboro, Arkansas, U.S.
- Died: July 30, 1986 (aged 60); Atlanta, Georgia, U.S.
- Genres: Jazz
- Instrument: Drums

William E. Clark (July 31, 1925 – July 30, 1986) was an American jazz drummer.

== Career ==
Clark worked professionally starting shortly after World War II, playing with Jimmy Jones, Dave Martin, Mundell Lowe, and George Duvivier. He was principally active in the 1950s, working with Lester Young, Mary Lou Williams, Lena Horne, Hazel Scott, Duke Ellington, Don Byas, Arnold Ross, Bernard Peiffer, George Shearing, Toots Thielemans, Ronnell Bright, Jackie Paris, and Rolf Kuhn. Later in his career he worked with Eddie Harris and Les McCann.
