= Jack Whitehead =

Australian rules footballer, born 1913

Personal information
- Full name: Jack Whitehead
- Born: 17 June 1913
- Died: 14 July 1986 (aged 73)
- Original team: Prahran
- Height: 175 cm (5 ft 9 in)
- Weight: 78 kg (172 lb)

Playing career^{1}
| Years | Club | Games (Goals) |
| 1942 | St Kilda | 3 (0) |
- ^{1} Playing statistics correct to the end of 1942.

Jack Whitehead (17 June 1913 – 14 July 1986) was an Australian rules footballer who played with St Kilda in the Victorian Football League (VFL).
