= Kamaran Mukeri =

Kurdish poet

kamaran mukeri
- muhammad ahmad taha
- Born: 1929; Sulaymaniyah, Iraq
- Died: 12 July 1986 (aged 57); Erbil, Iraq
- Resting place: his body was sent back to his hometown sulaymaniyah and he was buried there, in (girdi sirwan) graveyard.
- Occupations: Poet, writer, University lecturer
- Known for: saroki chwarina

Muhammed Ahmed Taha or Kameran Mukri, (کامەران موکری in Kurdish), (1929 – 12 July 1986), was a Kurdish poet and writer. Mukeri was born in Sulaimaniya city in Kurdistan in 1929.
