= Walter Hollitscher =

Austrian philosopher, educator, psychoanalyst and journalist

Walter Hollitscher (16 May 1911 – 6 July 1986) was an Austrian philosopher, educator, psychoanalyst and journalist.

== Biography ==
Walter Hollitscher was born as the youngest son into an upper-middle-class Viennese family in 1911 and was soon baptized as a Protestant. After his parents separated, his father moved with him to Prague. In 1925, Hollitscher joined the communist movement as a middle school student in Prague. In 1929 he passed his Abitur in Arnau an der Elbe and began studying biology, medicine and philosophy at the University of Vienna in the same year. In Vienna he became a member of the Communist Party of Austria in the same year and became friends with prominent intellectuals such as Ernst Fischer and Elias Canetti. In 1933 he received his doctorate from the University of Vienna with a thesis "On the reasons and causes of the dispute over the causal principle in the present", which was reviewed by Moritz Schlick and Robert Reininger. Hollitscher also passed the state examination for psychology and psychoanalysis. After the annexation of Austria by Nazi Germany, Hollitscher had to emigrate, first to Zurich, then to London.

October 1945, Hollitscher returned to Austria and worked at Vienna's public education and the Institute for Science and Art . In 1949 he accepted a position in the GDR at Berlin's Humboldt University, where he worked as full professor of logic and epistemology and first director of the philosophical institute until 1953. Hollitscher was friends with Paul Feyerabend. He attributed his philosophical “conversion” from positivism to realism to Hollitscher.

After his return to Vienna, Hollitscher became a science consultant for the KPÖ. From the 19th party congress in May 1965 to the 23rd party congress in December 1977, Hollitscher was a member of the Central Committee of the KPÖ. During the years of the party crisis and the political-ideological confrontation with revisionism by Ernst Fischer and Franz Marek, he and Ernst Wimmer were among the editors of the polemic New Politics. From 1965 to around 1984, Hollitscher spent several months every year as a visiting professor for philosophical problems in modern natural sciences at the University of Leipzig (then called Karl Marx University). There he was awarded an honorary doctorate in 1971. Hollitscher was also Chancellor of the International Institute for Peace, which was based in Vienna until it was dissolved.

Walter Hollitscher died on July 6, 1986, in Vienna. His grave can be found in the urn grove of the Vienna Central Cemetery.

== Selected works ==
- Über Gründe und Ursachen des Streites um das Kausalprinzip in der Gegenwart, 69 S. Wien, Phil. Diss.1934
- Report of the Committee for a Christmas to interned refugees, London: Dugdale & Marsland Ltd. 1941
- Notes on Education in Austria (compiled by R.F. Bayer and W. Hollitscher). Published by the Education Committee of the Free Austrian Movement in Great Britain, o. D. 1942
- Die Natur im Weltbild der Wissenschaft Wien, Globus Verlag 1960
- Die Entwicklung im Universum Berlin, Aufbau Verlag 1951
- Marxistische Religionssoziologie Wien 1967
- Aggression im Menschenbild Marx, Freud, Lorenz Frankfurt/Main Marxistische Blätter 1970
- Zur Kritik des zeitgenössischen Biologismus Berlin 1972
- Vom Nutzen der Philosophie und ihrer Geschichte Einleitungsvorlesung im Kursus über „Problemgeschichte und Geschichtsprobleme der europäischen Philosophie“, gehalten an der Abteilung für Wissenschaftstheorie des Instituts für Wissenschaft und Kunst in Wien, WS 1946/47. Wien Verlag Willy Verkauf 1947
- Über die Begriffe der psychischen Gesundheit und Erkrankung Eine wissenschaftslogische Untersuchung. Wien Gerold & Co 1947
- Jugoslawien im Aufbau Tagebuch einer Studienreise Wien Verlag der Österreichisch-Jugoslawischen Gesellschaft 1948
- Rassentheorie im Lichte der Wissenschaft Wien Verlag Willy Verkauf, Wien 1948
- Wissenschaftlich betrachtet 64 gemeinverständliche Aufsätze über Natur und Gesellschaft. Berlin Aufbau-Verlag 1951
- Wissenschaft und Sozialismus – heute und morgen Hg. von der KPÖ. Wien 1958
- Der Mensch im Weltbild der Wissenschaft Wien Globus-Verlag 1969
- Tierisches und Menschliches Essays Wien Globus-Verlag 1971
- Kain oder Prometheus? Zur Kritik des zeitgenössischen Biologismus Berlin Akademie-Verlag 1972
- Sexualität und Revolution Frankfurt/M. Verlag Marxistische Blätter 1972
- Grundbegriffe der marxistischen politischen Ökonomie und Philosophie Wien Globus-Verlag 1974
- Der überanstrengte Sexus Die so genannte sexuelle Emanzipation im heutigen Kapitalismus. Berlin Akademie-Verlag 1975
- Für und wider die Menschlichkeit Essays. Wien Globus-Verlag 1977
- Bedrohung und Zuversicht. Marxistische Essays Wien Globus-Verlag 1980
- Materie – Bewegung – kosmische Entwicklung Berlin Akademie-Verlag 1983 (unter Mitarbeit von Hubert Horstmann)
- Ursprung und Entwicklung des Lebens Berlin Akademie-Verlag 1984 (unter Mitarbeit von Rolf Löther)
- Lebewesen Mensch Berlin Akademie-Verlag 1985 (unter Mitarbeit von Rolf Löther)
- Die menschliche Psyche Berlin Akademie-Verlag 1983 (unter Mitarbeit von John Erpenbeck)
- Mensch und Gesellschaft Berlin Akademie-Verlag 1985 (unter Mitarbeit von Alfred Arnold)
- Naturbild und Weltanschauung Berlin Akademie-Verlag 1985 (unter Mitarbeit von Hubert Horstmann)
- Vorlesungen zur Dialektik der Natur Marburg Verlag Arbeit & Gesellschaft 1991
