= Gaffney Smith =

American football player and coach (1904–1986)

Biographical details
- Born: 1904
- Died: July 30, 1986 (aged 82); Columbia, South Carolina, U.S.

Playing career
- 1927–1929: Furman
- Position: Tackle

Coaching career (HC unless noted)
- 1935–1939: Campbell

Henry H. "Gaffney" Smith Sr. (1904 – July 30, 1986) was an American college football player and coach. He served as the head football coach at Campbell Junior College—now known as Campbell University—in Buies Creek, North Carolina from 1935 to 1939.

Smith was a star athlete at his alma mater, Furman University. He was a three-time letter winner at tackle.

Gaffney died at the age of 82, on July 30, 1986, at Baptist Medical Center in Columbia, South Carolina.
