= Ubirajara Fidalgo =

Brazilian actor (1949–1986)

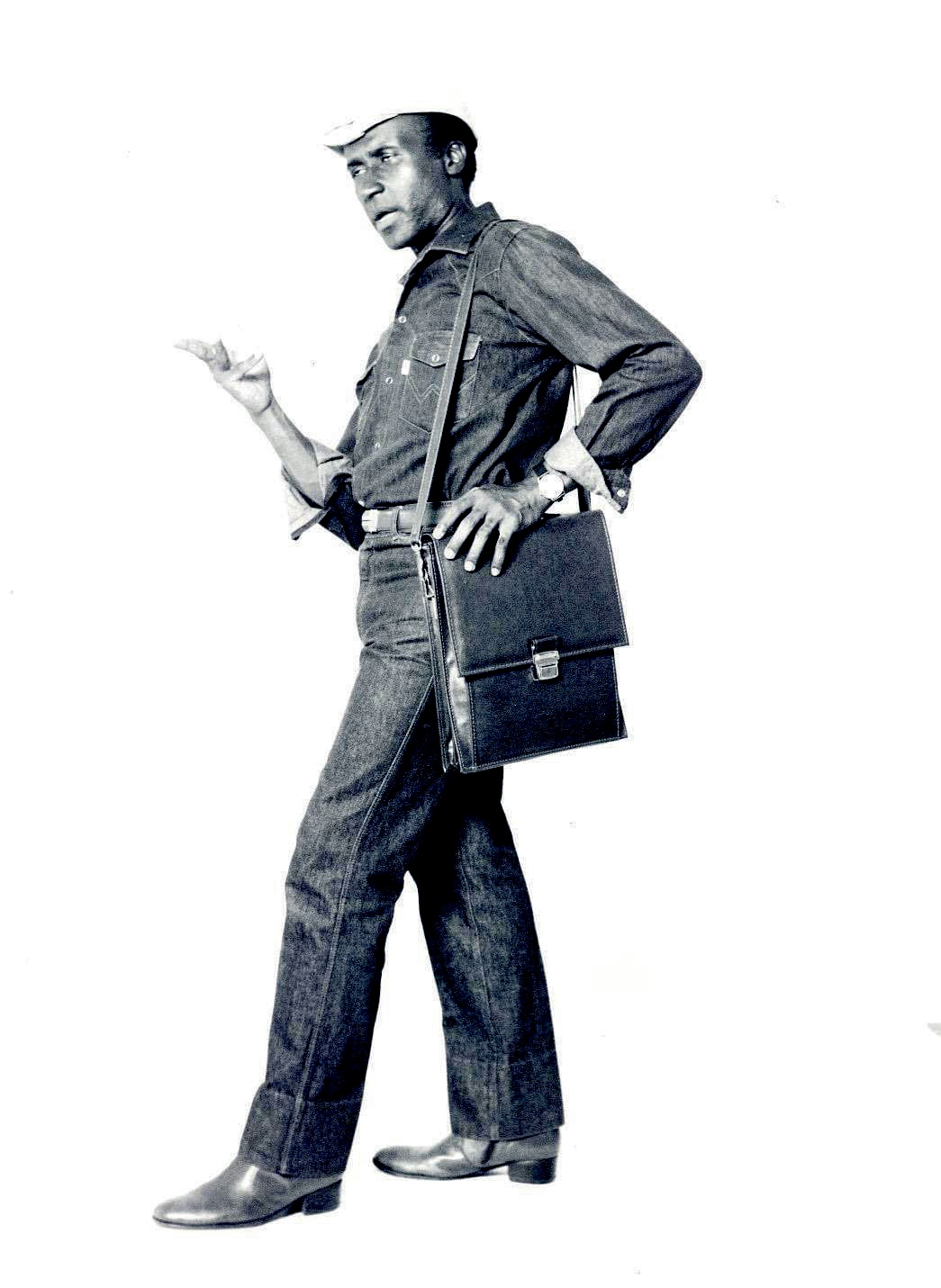
- Ubirajara Fidalgo in the poster for the monologue "Desfulga".
- Born: Ubirajara Fidalgo da Silva; June 22, 1949; Caxias, Maranhão
- Died: July 3, 1986; Rio de Janeiro, Brazil
- Occupations: Actor, Player, Director and Producer
- Years active: 1968–1986
- Spouse: Alzira Fidalgo (1974–1986)

Ubirajara Fidalgo da Silva, known as Ubirajara Fidalgo (Caxias, June 22, 1949 – Rio de Janeiro, July 3, 1986), was a Brazilian actor, director, theatrical producer, playwright and founder of the black professional theater Teatro Profissional do Negro (TEPRON). He was a social activist in Afro-Brazilian politics ( "Movimento Negro").

He was married to producer Alzira Fidalgo, with whom he had a daughter, the filmmaker Sabrina Fidalgo.

== Career ==
=== Theater and TEPRON ===
In 1968, Fidalgo moved to Rio de Janeiro. In 1970 he directed and starred in Othello by William Shakespeare at Teatro Thereza Rachel. This production marked the debut of Teatro Profissional do Negro (TEPRON), a theater company co-founded by Fidalgo and Alzira Fidalgo. TEPRON aimed to stage socially and politically engaged works, focusing on the experiences and struggles of Afro-Brazilians.

Subsequent TEPRON productions included A Boneca da Lapa, the children's play Os Gazeteiros, and several original works by Fidalgo. The company also offered acting workshops in underserved communities, working to professionalize actors from favelas and rough areas and integrate them into the cultural and political discussions promoted by the company's plays.

In the early 1980s, Fidalgo broadened TEPRON’s mission with Desfulga, a monologue followed by post-performance debates with guests and audiences. These events addressed themes such as racism, homophobia, misogyny, social inequality, and the military dictatorship, drawing attention from politicians, academics, activists, and members of the Black Movement.

At its peak, TEPRON had three productions running simultaneously: Desfulga, Fala Pra Eles Elisabete, and Os Gazeteiros. These plays remained in repertory for three years.<ref>Funarte Portal das Artes. "'Namíbia, não!' inaugura mostra de dramaturgia afrodescendente no Arena (SP)."

== Activism ==
In 1975, Fidalgo co-founded the Instituto de Pesquisa e Cultura Negra (IPCN – Institute for Black Research and Culture), a key organization within Brazil's Black social movement. IPCN was one of the few Afro-Brazilian cultural institutions to maintain its own headquarters and operated through community-based membership. The institute faced financial difficulties in the late 1980s and eventually closed.

Fidalgo later collaborated with professor and writer Joel Rufino dos Santos in the creation of ACAAN (Cultural Association for the Support of Black Arts), which continued his commitment to Afro-Brazilian cultural expression and education.

== Final Work and Legacy ==
Fidalgo’s final theatrical work was the play Tuti, staged in 1985 at Teatro Calouste Gulbenkian, in Rio de Janeiro. He served as both director and co-producer. The play was revived in 1998 at Teatro SESC Copacabana, directed by Cyrano Rosalém, and became one of the first cultural projects to tour the Lonas Culturais in the state of Rio de Janeiro.

TEPRON is recognized as the first Afro-Brazilian theater company in Rio de Janeiro and the second in Brazil, after Teatro Experimental do Negro (TEN), founded by Abdias do Nascimento.

== Death ==
Ubirajara Fidalgo died on July 3, 1986, at the age of 37, at São Lucas Hospital in Rio de Janeiro. He had undergone a kidney transplant months earlier. A car accident during his childhood left him with long-term kidney failure.

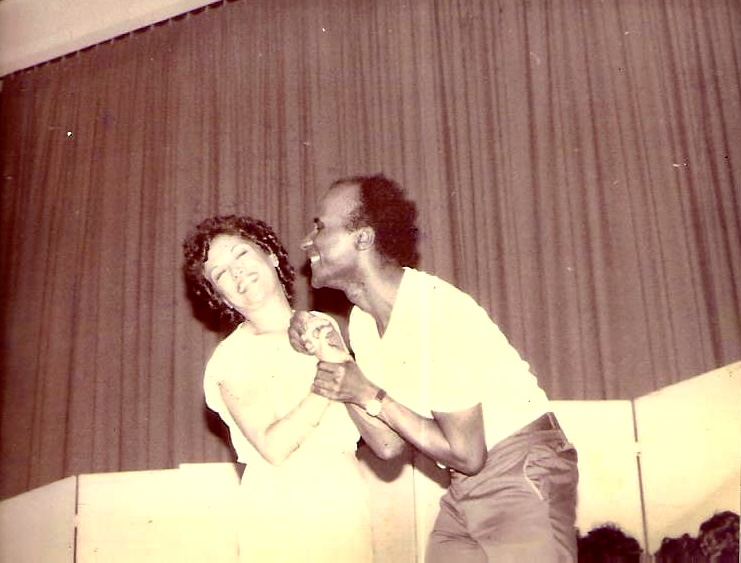
Fidalgo on stage during the production of the play “Fala Pra Eles, Elisabete” at Teatro Thereza Rachel

== Plays ==
  - Uma Esposa Para Dois Irmãos
  - Buscando o Infinito
  - A Incrível Boneca da Lapa
  - A Voz da Consciência
  - A Venda do Pecado
  - A Superexcitação
  - Desfulga
  - Os Gazeteiros
  - Fala Para Eles Elisabete
  - Tuti
  - Bambi's Son
