= Murray Vaughan =

Canadian philanthropist

A. Murray Vaughan, CC (23 January 1899 – 19 July 1986) was a philanthropist of the arts in Canada.

He was appointed a Companion of the Order of Canada in 1969.

Born in Saint John, New Brunswick, the son of Walter S. and Gertrude (Allingham) Vaughan. In 1930, he married the former Miss L. Marguerite Pillow of Montreal, daughter of Howard W. and Lucille Elizabeth (Fairbank) Pillow. Mr. Vaughan lived in Montreal for four decades until the 1970s, where for a time he was president of the Montreal Museum of Fine Arts (1963–1968). In later years, he returned to New Brunswick and became an honorary chair of Fredericton Beaverbrook Art Gallery. At 86, he died in Saint John, New Brunswick.
