= Erwin Milzkott =

German flutist (1913–1986)

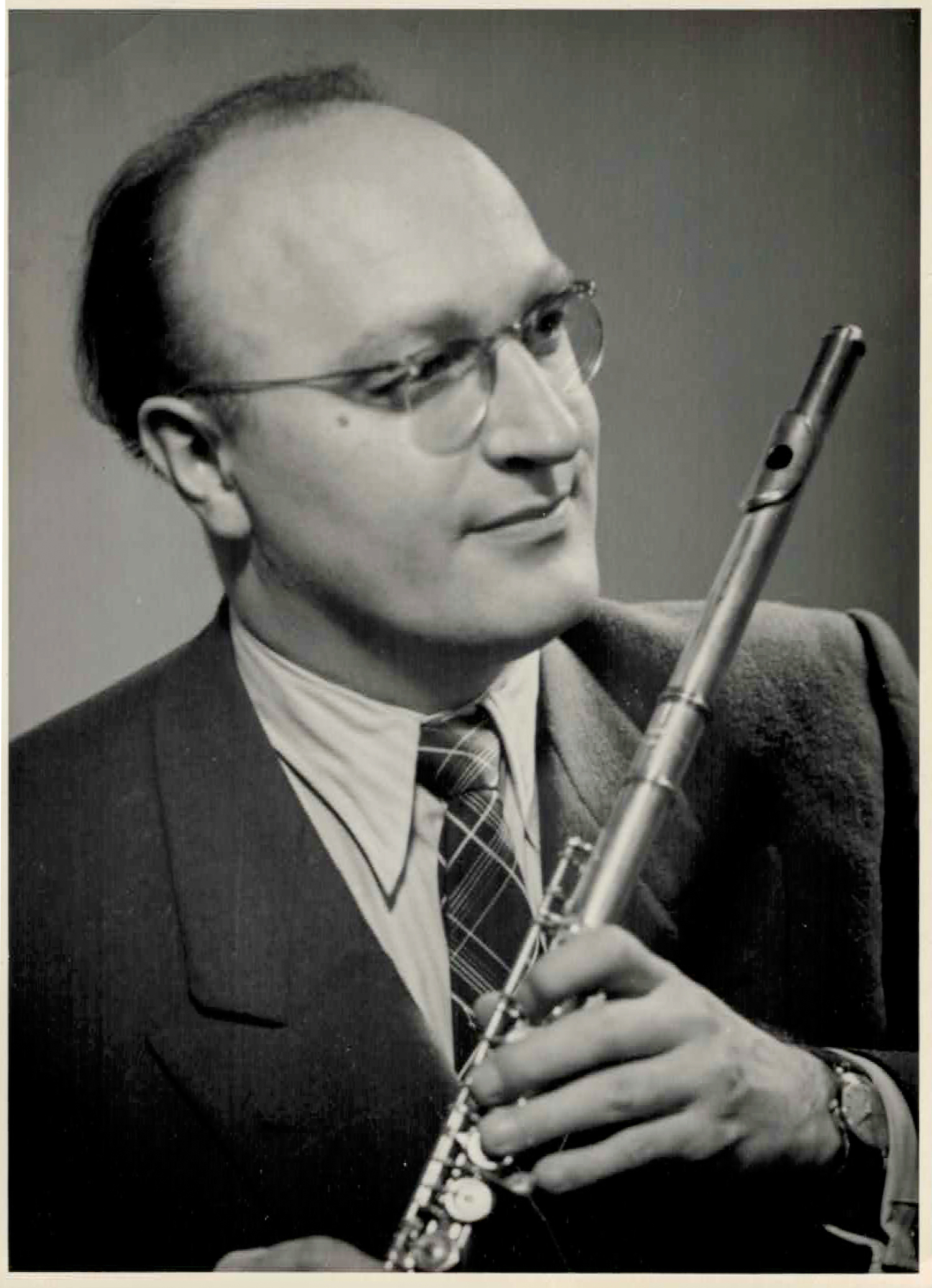
Erwin Milzkott, ca. 1954

Erwin Milzkott (1 June 1913 – 2 July 1986) was a German musician.

== Life ==
Born in Hagen, Milzkott grew up in the merchant family of Wilhelm and Elise Milzkott with his sister Grete. He was considered a musical prodigy, and in 1925 played Beethoven's Piano Concerto No. 1 mit dem Hagener Symphonie-Orchester.

From 1930 to 1934, he studied flute, piano and harpsichord at the Hochschule für Musik und Tanz Köln. He had his first orchestral engagements in Bremen, Hanover and Lübeck. From 1936 to 1938, he was principal flute at the Gewandhausorchester in Leipzig.

Between 1938 and 1942, he was a member of the Berlin Philharmonic and undertook concert tours to Paris, Madrid and Lisbon. Because of his refusal to join the music corps of the SS, he was sent to pioneer units on the Eastern Front in 1942. In 1945-1948, he played again with the Berlin Philharmonic under Sergiu Celibidache. From 1949, he had an engagement with the Rundfunk-Sinfonieorchester Berlin as principal flutist. In 1950, he founded the wind quintet of the Berliner Rundfunk. That same year, he was appointed "Kammer virtuoso". In 1950, he took up the first professorship for flute at the newly founded German Academy of Music in East Berlin. Among his students was Eberhard Grünenthal, who later became professor of flute in Rostock. At the German Academy of Music, his sister Grete Herwig, née Milzkott, had also held the professorship for piano since 1950.

As a soloist, he performed under conductors such as Hermann Abendroth, whom he had met during his studies in Cologne, Sergiu Celibidache, Franz Konwitschny, Helmut Koch, Antal Doráti and Robert Stolz. As an accompanist, he worked with violinist Max Mikhailov and cellist Paul Tortelier, as well as singers Dietrich Fischer-Dieskau, Anny Schlemm and Anna Moffo.

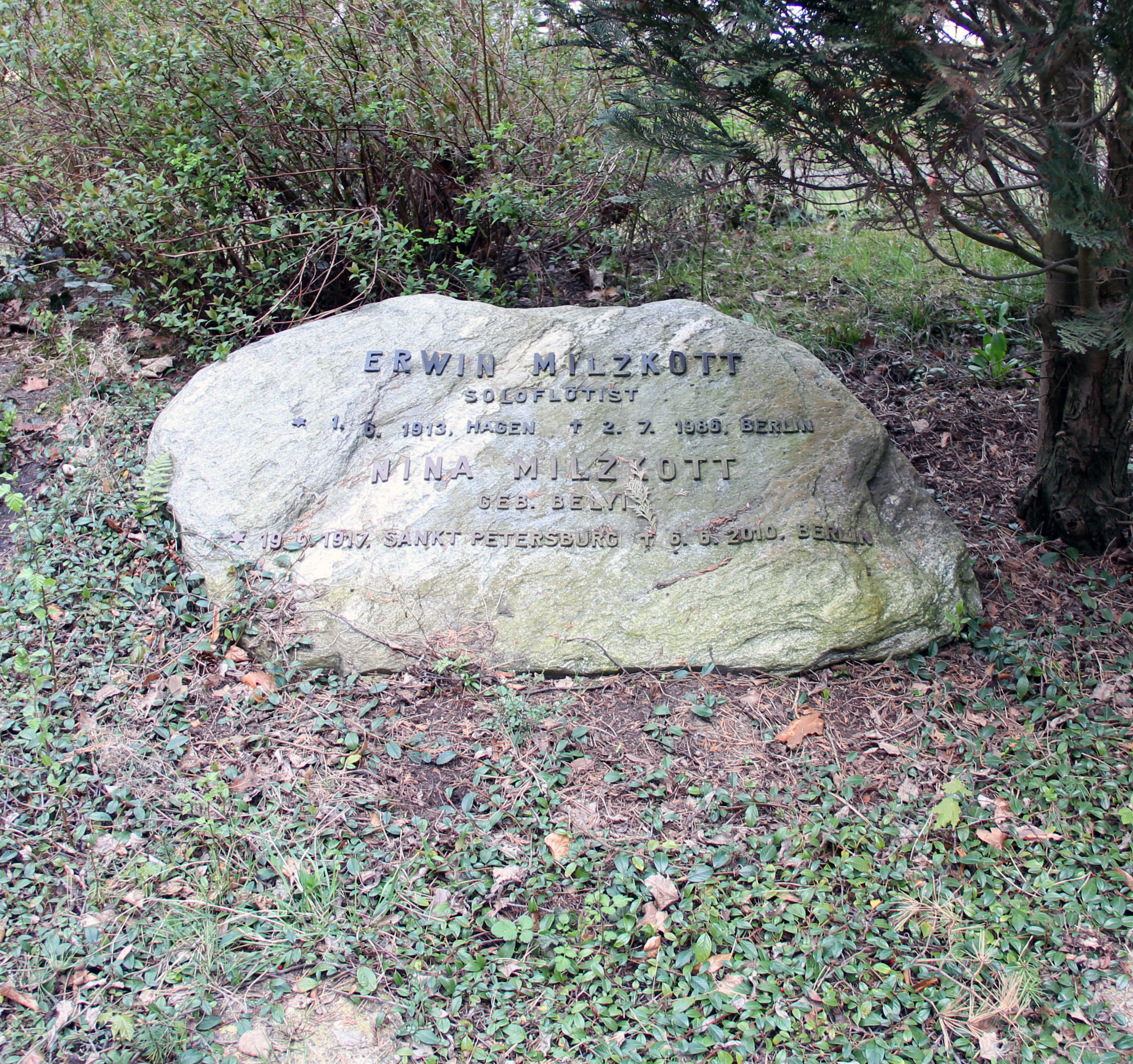
Grave of Erwin Milzkott at the Friedhof Heerstraße in Berlin-Westend

The construction of the Berlin Wall in August 1961 abruptly ended the musician's activities as an orchestra and chamber musician and as a university teacher in East Berlin. Milzkott taught flutists and saxophonists, including jazz players, privately until 1980.

Milzkott died in Berlin on 2 July 1986 at the age of 73. His grave is located on the state-owned Friedhof Heerstraße in Berlin-Westend.

== Recordings ==
In the late 1960s he played the harpsichord continuo with Antal Doráti on the complete recording of the 101 Haydn's symphonies in Marl for Decca Records. Milzkott's recordings still played by radio stations today include the Concerto for Flute and Orchestra in D Major by Wolfgang Amadeus Mozart, KV 136 from 1958, the Triple Concerto, BWV 1044 by Johann Sebastian Bach, the Triple Concerto for Flute, Oboe d'amore, Viola d'amore, Strings and Basso continuo in E major by Georg Philipp Telemann, the recording of Georg Friedrich Händel's Messiah in German under Helmut Koch, in which Milzkott played the basso continuo.

Recordings by Milzkott of works written for him by contemporary composers such as Max Butting, Fidelio F. Finke and Rudolf Wagner-Régeny can be found on Editionen des Deutschen Musikrats.
