= Benjamin B. Patterson =

American politician (1910–1986)

Benjamin B. Patterson (August 15, 1910 – July 5, 1986) was an American businessman and politician.

Patterson was born in Hibbing, St. Louis County, Minnesota. He received his bachelor's degree in commerce from University of North Dakota and then went to graduate school at University of Minnesota in 1966. He lived with his wife and family in Deer River, Itasca County, Minnesota. Patterson was the owner of the Pine Resort in Deer River, Minnesota. He served as the administrative assistant to the Secretary of the Minnesota Senate from 1957 to 1962. Patterson then served in the Minnesota Senate from 1963 to 1966. In 1970, Patterson suffered a stroke and in 1971, he moved to Rochester, Minnesota. He died at the Methodist Hospital in Rochester, Minnesota.
