= Len Vautier =

Australian rules footballer, born 1909

Personal information
- Full name: Len Vautier
- Born: 23 March 1909
- Died: 7 July 1986 (aged 77)

Playing career^{1}
Years	Club	Games (Goals)
1928–30, 1932	Geelong	21 (8)
- ^{1} Playing statistics correct to the end of 1932.

Len Vautier (23 March 1909 – 7 July 1986) was an Australian rules footballer who played with Geelong in the Victorian Football League (VFL).

Vautier retired at the age of 21 when he got a job with the State Electricity Commission of Victoria and relocated to Omeo, Victoria. After twelve months he was back for one more season before retiring for good.
