= Eric Donaldson (footballer, born 1899) =

Australian rules footballer

Personal information
- Full name: Eric Alan Donaldson
- Born: 27 August 1899; Heyfield, Victoria, Australia
- Died: 20 July 1986 (aged 86); Ringwood, Victoria, Australia
- Original team: Lang Lang
- Height: 178 cm (5 ft 10 in)
- Weight: 74 kg (163 lb)
- Position: Centre half back

Playing career^{1}
Years	Club	Games (Goals)
1923–24	Melbourne	13 (0)
- ^{1} Playing statistics correct to the end of 1924.

Eric Alan Donaldson (27 August 1899 – 20 July 1986) was an Australian rules footballer who played with Melbourne in the Victorian Football League (VFL).
