= Paul Adams (coach) =

American sports coach (1921–1986)

Biographical details
- Born: April 5, 1921
- Died: July 4, 1986 (aged 65); Miller Lake, Ontario, Canada
- Education: Baldwin Wallace University

Playing career

Football
- c. 1940: Baldwin–Wallace

Basketball
- c. 1940: Baldwin–Wallace
- Positions: Quarterback (football); Guard (basketball)

Coaching career (HC unless noted)

Football
- 1949–1950: Muskingum (assistant)
- 1951–1953: Baldwin–Wallace (assistant)
- 1954–1957: Baldwin–Wallace
- 1958–c. 1980: Baldwin–Wallace (assistant)

Basketball
- 1949–1951: Muskingum (assistant)
- ?: Baldwin–Wallace (assistant)

Cross country
- 1958–1983: Baldwin–Wallace

Track
- 1951–1983: Baldwin–Wallace

Tennis
- 1950–1951: Muskingum

Head coaching record
- Overall: 8–25–1 (football)

Paul L. "Sparky" Adams (April 5, 1921 – July 4, 1986) was an American football, cross country running, and track and field coach. He served as the head football coach at Baldwin–Wallace College—now known at Baldwin Wallace University—in Berea, Ohio from 1954 to 1957, compiling a record of 8–25–1. In 1958, he stepped down to become an assistant football coach, so he could focus his roles as the head cross country and track coach at Baldwin–Wallace, positions that he held until his retirement in 1983. Adams was also and assistant basketball coach and a swimming coach at Baldwin–Wallace.

A native of Newark, Ohio, Adams attended Baldwin–Wallace, where he lettered in football, basketball, and track, before graduating in 1943. He served in Third Army of the United States Army, led by Gernal George S. Patton, during World War II, earning a Purple Heart before his discharge in 1945.

Adams died at the age of 65, on July 4, 1986, of an apparent heart attack while on vacation in Miller Lake, Ontario.

== Head coaching record ==
=== Football ===
Year	Team	Overall	Conference	Standing	Bowl/playoffs
Baldwin–Wallace Yellow Jackets (Independent) (1954–1957)
1954	Baldwin–Wallace	1–8			
1955	Baldwin–Wallace	2–6			
1956	Baldwin–Wallace	4–5			
1957	Baldwin–Wallace	1–6–1			
Baldwin–Wallace:		8–25–1			
Total:		8–25–1			
