= Edmund Kolanowski =

Polish serial killer

- Born: 24 October 1947; Polish People's Republic
- Died: 28 July 1986 (aged 38); Poznań, Polish People's Republic
- Cause of death: Execution by hanging
- Conviction: Murder (3 counts)
- Penalty: Death

Details
- Victims: 3
- Span of crimes: 1970–1982
- Country: Poland
- State: Poznań
- Date apprehended: 16 May 1983

Edmund Kolanowski (24 October 1947 – 28 July 1986) was a Polish serial killer and necrophile who killed three women, as well as mutilating several corpses from graveyards.

== Early life ==
He had an older brother, Andrzej, who died at the age of 2. For this reason, Kolanowski's mother often took him to the Miłostowo cemetery. In primary school, Kolanowski had to repeat the first, third and fifth grades. Due to his behaviour, the doctor directed him to a facility for the mentally ill. Later he continued his education at a vocational school, which he did not finish; nevertheless, he eventually got a job as an electrician. He married a woman named Zofia in 1970, with whom he had two daughters (born in 1970 and 1972, respectively), but their marriage was annulled at his wife's request in 1975. From 1980, Kolanowski lived with a prostitute named Gabriele, with whom he had one daughter.

== Crimes ==
From the age of 11, Kolanowski enjoyed watching corpses in the hospital. At the age of 15, he began to accost women in the centre of Poznań, for which the juvenile court sentenced him to stay in a youth detention centre, but the sentence was suspended for a period of two years. He attempted suicide by shoving a knife in his stomach, but was rescued. In 1966 he was sentenced to one and a half years in prison for beating up an inmate, and left in November 1967. From 1972 onwards, he began to terrorize (kicking, beating, tearing the hair, threatening and wounding with a knife) women at Lake Rusałka. The militiamen eventually detained him, and the court could prove three assaults, sentencing him to nine years imprisonment. He left prison in 1979, after serving two-thirds of his sentence.

Kolanowski later admitted to the following murders:

- On 27 October 1970, he murdered and then mutilated 21-year-old Kazimiera G. in the village of Baborówko near the railway station. Her body was never found.
- On 16 March 1981, he murdered a 20-year-old woman in Warsaw's Wawer district.
- On 4 November 1982, he murdered and mutilated an 11-year-old girl in Naramowice.

He also admitted to the following crimes:

- desecrating the corpse of a deceased neighbour
- in 1972, at the age of 25, he excavated and desecrated corpses
- in July 1980, he mutilated the corpses in the cemetery chapel of Nowa Sól.
- on 26 February 1982, he stole and then mutilated the corpse of a woman from the cemetery chapel in Naramowice
- on 29 November 1982, he excavated and desecrated a body from the Miłostowo cemetery in Poznań.
- on 28 January 1983, he excavated and desecrated another body from the Miłostowo cemetery.

He mutilated the corpses by cutting off the breasts and genitals, and would then sew them onto a mannequin for sexual purposes. After a few days, he burned some of the corpses in his furnace.

== Arrest, trial and sentence ==
On 7 May 1983, he managed to escape an ambush set by the militia at the Miłostowo cemetery, but he lost a piece of paper on the site with the inscription of Pollen Łaskarzew. In the course of the investigation, militiamen reached the Pollen factory and on 16 May 1983, they arrested Kolanowski, who worked there.

During the interrogations, he admitted to desecrating corpses. A comparison of the murdered girl's blood type (B Rh-) with traces of blood on the suspect's jacket and the testimony of a crossing railway conductor at Naramowice incriminated him, and after four months, Kolanowski admitted to killing her.

He went to a psychiatric hospital for observation. Despite assuring that he understood his mistakes by saying "Now I think I did wrong", he called himself the "Cold surgeon" in the hospital.

On the basis of a three-year investigation, Kolanowski was accused of three murders, five corpse desecrations and the theft of a gold ring. During the trial, which began on 22 January 1985, he cancelled his testimony, claiming that it was forced. Expert doctors ruled that he was not mentally ill while committing his crimes.

The Provincial Court in Poznań found Edmund Kolanowski guilty and on 4 June 1985, he was sentenced to death. Kolanowski's lawyer appealed the decision and requested a review of the sentence, but the Supreme Court of Poland upheld the verdict. On 28 July 1986, Kolanowski was hanged in the detention centre in Poznań. His execution was the last one to be conducted there, and he was buried on 1 August 1986, in the Miłostowo cemetery.

== In the media ==
In 2014, a book about Kolanowski titled Martwe ciała, written by Waldemar Ciszak and Michał Larek, was published.

== See also ==
- Ted Bundy
- List of serial killers by country
