= Kenneth Holland (cricketer) =

English cricketer

Kenneth Holland (29 March 1911 – 21 July 1986) was an English cricketer active in 1935 who played for Leicestershire. He was born in Leicester and died in Norwich. He appeared in two first-class matches as a righthanded batsman who bowled right arm fast medium. He scored two runs with a highest score of 2 and took three wickets with a best performance of one for 9.
