= Stuart Bergsma =

American medical missionary

- Born: November 15, 1900; Grand Rapids, Michigan, US
- Died: July 30, 1986 (aged 85); Tucson, Arizona, US
- Education: Calvin College (BA); University of Chicago (MD); London School of Hygiene & Tropical Medicine
- Occupations: Psychiatrist, medical missionary
- Employer: Board of Foreign Missions of the United Presbyterian Church of North America

Stuart Bergsma (November 15, 1900 – July 30, 1986) was an American psychiatrist, medical missionary, and author. He served with the United Presbyterian Church of North America in Ethiopia and India, with periods between spent practicing medicine in the United States. In India Bergsma was superintendent of a hospital at Ludhiana, Punjab. He wrote on the phenomenon of speaking in tongues, which he connected to emotional stress or a desire to raise the patient's social standing.

== Early life and education ==
Stuart Bergsma was born in Grand Rapids, Michigan, on November 15, 1900. He received a Bachelor of Arts degree from Calvin College in his hometown and then a medical doctorate from the University of Chicago. Bergsma also received a diploma from the London School of Hygiene & Tropical Medicine in the United Kingdom.

== Career ==
Bergsma joined the Board of Foreign Missions of the United Presbyterian Church of North America (UPCNA) in 1928 as a medical missionary and surgeon. In April 1928 he joined the American Mission Hospital in Ethiopia. He remained there until 1934 and rose to become superintendent of the hospital that treated 1,400 in-patients and 10,000 out-patients per year. During this time Bergsma treated many cases of typhus, typhoid and malaria, he also occasionally preached a sermon. The UPCNA mission was based in Addis Ababa and had mission stations in Welega Province but Bergsma visited the western province of Sayo in 1930.

Bergsma returned to the United States in 1934 and practiced medicine at Passaic, New Jersey until 1938. In 1939 he rejoined the UPCNA to serve as a missionary in India. Bergsma returned to the US again in 1943 and worked in a medical capacity in Grand Rapids. In 1949 he returned to missionary work as a surgeon, hospital superintendent and associate professor of surgery at the Christian Medical College at Ludhiana, Punjab.

Bergsma returned to the United States in 1953 and was hired as clinical director and senior staff psychiatrist at Pine Rest Christian Mental Health Services. He was promoted to superintendent of the hospital in 1965. Between 1955 and 1958 he undertook a residency in psychiatry at the Eastern State Hospital in Williamsburg, Virginia. Bergsma afterwards practiced as a psychiatrist in Grand Rapids from 1958 to 1972.

Upon his retirement in 1976, Bergsma lived for five years in Florida before relocating to Arizona. He died in Tucson on July 30, 1986.

== Works ==
Bergsma wrote about the phenomenon of speaking in tongues, which he connected to high emotional stress in the subject. He used the analogy of a computer which, if overloaded with information, may produce erratic nonsense output. He also suggested that the subject may voluntarily speak in tongues as a means of raising their status in society.

He wrote the books Rainbow Empire (1932), based on his medical missionary work in Ethiopia, Songs of Sheba (1933), Just One Small Choir, Gabriel!: A Christmas Story (1964), and See That Holy Child: The story of the twelve-year-old Christ (1972).

== Personal life ==
Bergsma and his wife, Mildred Bosma (1904–1993), had two sons and one daughter. Mildred served as a medical missionary alongside her husband during their sixteen years in Ethiopia and India. At the time of his death, they had been married 59 years.
