= Aukusti Pasanen =

Finnish lawyer, civil servant, and politician

Aukusti Pasanen (8 August 1902, Juva – 10 July 1986) was a Finnish lawyer, civil servant and politician. He was a Member of the Parliament of Finland from 1951 to 1958, representing the People's Party of Finland.
