= Richard Wootton (cricketer) =

Australian cricketer

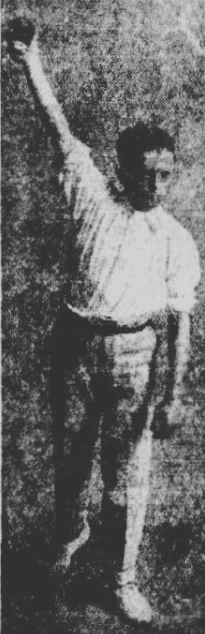

Personal information
- Born: 18 January 1906; Rushworth, Victoria, Australia
- Died: 18 July 1986 (aged 80)

Domestic team information
- Years: Team
- 1929-1930: Victoria
- Source: Cricinfo, 21 November 2015

Richard Wootton (18 January 1906 – 18 July 1986) was an Australian cricketer. He played two first-class cricket matches for Victoria between 1929 and 1930.

== See also ==
- List of Victoria first-class cricketers
