= Merry Gentry =

Fictional character

Meredith "Merry" Gentry is the protagonist of an eponymous fantasy series by US writer Laurell K. Hamilton, best known for her other fantasy series Anita Blake: Vampire Hunter. The series comprises nine novels and was written between 2000 when the series began with "A Kiss of Shadows" and the final book, "A Shiver of Light", published in June 3, 2014.

== Character profile ==
Meredith NicEssus is a faerie princess turned private investigator in a world where faeries are not only known to the general public, but are also fashionable. She takes on the pseudonym "Merry Gentry" to hide from her family and her past while hiding out in Los Angeles, California as a private investigator at Grey's Detective Agency. Merry, the only Sidhe (pronounced "shEE") royal to be born on American soil, fearing the continuous assassination attempts on her life thinly disguised as duels, flees the Unseelie Court in a final act of self-preservation. Her glamour (the art of magical disguise through illusion) is nearly unrivaled at court, and she is able to pass herself off as a human with fey blood.

The general tone of the writing is less of an outright fantasy and more of an alternate history. The point of divergence from normal history is not provided, although hints are given about how the faerie history intersects with human history (Adolf Hitler, the Great Famine of Ireland, and Thomas Jefferson are examples). In the books, Jefferson gave the Unseelie and Seelie courts asylum after the European courts exiled them—however with the caveat that they could not set themselves up as gods or make war on one another, by doing so they would risk being evicted from US soil.

At the beginning of the first book in the series, Merry's full name and title is Princess Meredith NicEssus, Child of Peace, Besaba's Bane. "NicEssus" means, literally, "daughter of Essus"; it is the sort of name given to a child and laid aside once the child has come into his or her powers. That Merry used the name into her thirties is a sign that she is a late bloomer at best, a lesser sidhe at worst. After a child comes into their power, the last name is dropped. Later in the series it is revealed that Meredith is a descendant of fertility deities of both courts.

As of the end of the second book in the series, Merry's titles are Princess of Flesh and Blood; at the end of the fourth book, The Red And White Goddess is added to her title by demi-fey who gave her the title when her magic gave wings to wingless demi-fey.

The series chronicles the return of Meredith to the Unseelie Court by way of an invitation sent by her Aunt Andais, the Queen of Air and Darkness in the form of her right hand, Doyle, also known as The Queen's Darkness. She is given men from the queen's own guard, her Ravens, to guard her body and fill her bed as heir to the throne, provided she can conceive a child before her cousin, Cel. Later Merry adds to her collection of men first by taking the men offered to her by Queen Andais, as well as forming alliances with the demi-fey, goblins, and Red Caps.

== Alliances formed by Meredith ==
Meredith formed her first alliance with Sholto King of the Sluagh when he is sent to Los Angeles by an unknown man (later theorized to be Cel, her cousin). Once there, Sholto uses his guards to track her down. However the hags (Sholto's guards and lovers) attempt to kill Merry. Once Sholto convinces Merry to accompany him to his hotel room. They agree to form an alliance which was to be consecrated by Merry having sex with Sholto. They are interrupted by Nerys The Gray who attempts to kill Merry. However, Merry comes into her first hand of power (the Hand of Flesh) due to her "shining" moment with Sholto and uses her newly found hand of power on Nerys. She is eventually convinced to kill Nerys with Doyle's killing blade by Doyle and Sholto, because Nerys is immortal and cannot die even if she is turned into an inside-out ball of flesh (the results of Merry's hand of power).

The second alliance is formed between Merry and Kurag, King of the Goblins. This occurs when Merry is bled by the roses that line the entrance to the throne room of the Unseelie Court. She passes out from blood loss and opens her eyes to see one of the goblins drinking from her open wound (to goblins bodily fluids are sacred). She has the goblin detained and bargains with Kurag for a 6-month alliance in return for Merry taking a goblin (Kitto) into her bed. She deems this acceptable payment for the theft of her blood. Later Merry bargains for an extended alliance of 1 month for each sidhe-sided goblin that she brings into power. Also, Merry brings the Red Caps back to their full original power because she is the only Sidhe who possesses the full Hand of Blood. By doing so, the Red Caps owe her their own alliance outside of the one formed between Merry and Kurag.

The final alliance is struck between Merry and Niceven (Queen of the Demi-Fey). This is struck when Merry bargains for the cure to a curse that the Demi-Fey placed on Galen, under the direction of Cel. She bargains with Niceven for a year alliance during which the demi-fey will spy for Merry in exchange for weekly blood donations by Merry. This alliance is brought into question later on when Queen Niceven's surrogate, who can become nearly human sized, has sex with Meredith and becomes stuck in his form (at the same time, Meredith brings Nicca, one of her lovers, the wings that he should have been born with but instead had become a supernatural tattoo on his back) because of this, Queen Niceven sends to Meredith the Demi-Fey that were born without wings in hopes that she will also give them their wings.

== Meredith's lovers ==
To name the most prominent of her lovers (with titles in parentheses):

- Doyle (the Queen's Darkness, Nodons, Bearer of the Painful Flame, Baron Sweet Tongue)
- Frost (the Killing Frost, once was Jackie Frost)
- Sholto (King of the Sluagh, Lord of That Which Passes Between, Lord of Shadows)
- Galen (the Green Knight)
- Mistral (The Storm Lord)
- Rhys (Cromm Cruach)
- Kitto
- Nicca
  - Nicca left Merry's harem, with her blessings, after a magical artifact pointed him to his soulmate Biddy.

In A Lick of Frost, it was revealed that Merry was pregnant with twins, each with three fathers; the six fathers were Doyle, Frost, Sholto, Galen, Mistral and Rhys. These six, therefore, will become her kings if and when she ever takes the throne. She has (as of Swallowing Darkness) been specifically crowned by Faerie as Sholto's queen as well as Doyle's queen; however, she has made it quite clear that this does not mean she is bound to have either of them as her only king.

In addition, she has also bedded the roane [seal shapeshifter] Roane, the Sidhe Adair, Amatheon, Abeloec, Ivi, and Brii, the half-goblin twins Ash and Holly, and the demi-feys named Sage and Royal. She has also had metaphysical sex with Barinthus (formerly Manannan Mac Lir).

In A Shiver of Light, it is in fact revealed to Merry's surprise that she is in fact having triplets, one of her babes was hiding behind her siblings in the womb

== Thrones held by Merry ==
In Swallowing Darkness, Merry was crowned Queen of the Sluagh by Faerie, and soon was formally recognized by the Sluagh as Sholto's queen. Near the end of the same book, Merry was crowned Queen of the Unseelie Court (the Crown of Moonlight and Shadows) and Doyle was crowned her king (with the Crown of Thorn and Silver); however, when offered a chance by the Goddess, they gave up the Unseelie throne in exchange for Frost's life.

She has also been offered the Seelie throne by certain members of the Seelie court, as their infertile king has gone mad and is no longer fit to rule, but has refused. Merry repeatedly states, both in her own thoughts and to her guards, that she does not believe she would be accepted on either the Seelie or Unseelie thrones because of her mortality and mixed (human, brownie, and sidhe) blood, and that she would invite certain death for either herself or some of her men by attempting to rule either court.

In the most recent book, A Shiver of Light, King Sholto's death threatens Merry's place and queen of the Sluagh. She is surprised that the Sluagh remain loyal to her and refuse to elect another king till Sholto is avenged. At the end of the book she still remains Queen of the Sluagh, as well as claiming the title of the Queen of Faerie in the westerlands with approval of the Goddess and Consort.

== Merry's development of powers ==
Early in A Kiss of Shadows, Merry is assaulted by a human using Branwyn's Tears, a magical aphrodisiac/date-rape drug, apparently unlocking her sidhe powers. Branwyn's Tears temporarily turns any creature into a sidhe and forces them to crave sexual intercourse. Sexual intercourse is one of a few fae rituals which can raise power and activate personal magics. When Merry had intercourse with her boyfriend, who was a roane, she simultaneously returned his ability to change shape (which he had lost after a fisherman burned his seal-skin) and raised magic in her two hands indicating she possesses two hands of power.

Her first hand of power (Hand of Flesh) develops when she is attacked by Nerys the Grey, a night hag. In the process of defending herself, Merry accidentally turns Nerys into a screaming, agonized ball of inside-out flesh. (As Nerys was a creature of Faerie, she was able to survive the process, much to Merry's horror and revulsion.) This power is known as the Hand of Flesh, which Merry's father, Essus, also possessed. After this, Doyle gives her Queen Andais's sword, Mortal Dread, which she uses to put the inside-out night hag out of her misery. In the process, she becomes covered with blood, and Doyle tells her that in order to cement her powers, she had to cover herself in the blood of an enemy (which was his purpose in giving her the blade).

In A Caress of Twilight, Merry develops her second hand of power. Merry must protect Maeve Reed, an exile from the Seelie court, from the Nameless (when the fey came to America they gave up their most deadly magicks; the Nameless was made up of those magicks). During the battle, she charges the mass of energy and puts her left hand out; she feels her blood begin to boil, and large gashes appear on the enormous mass of magic. All Merry has to do is think "Bleed" (occasionally "Bleed for me!"), and the person (or things) bleeds. This is the development of the Hand of Blood.

Following Merry's destruction of The Nameless, fae magic (called "wild magic") inside The Nameless is released, resulting in the return of old powers to fae as well as the development of new powers. Merry develops the ability to both return godhood to fae and elevate fae to godhood who had never been gods. Merry also begins attracting ancient relics of power that had disappeared over time including the ancient cauldron (which took the form of a chalice). Further, Merry re-energizes existing ancient relics of power including Queen Andais's ring and the Healing Spring.

Near the end of Seduced by Moonlight, after Merry duels with a Sidhe, her opponent does not die, though she is mortally wounded and has (as part of the pre-battle ritual) shared blood with Merry. As sharing Merry's mortal blood has previously caused other opponents to become mortal in battle, this may indicate that Merry is no longer a mortal. However, later books have not yet followed up on this development, and Merry herself still believes she is mortal.

In Swallowing Darkness, we see a darker side to Merry and her magic. For the second time she uses her magic as a tool for death. When facing Onilwyn she puts her left hand out and thinks "die" not "bleed". It is also detailed that during her fight with her cousin Cel she visualizes a fist inside him and when she opens that fist he exploded.

However, for all the dark deeds done with her magic there is a lighter side. It seems that many times when she has sex with another person of power, something natural and beautiful grows. This is witnessed frequently throughout the books. The most amazing example of the lighter side to her magic is during one of the battle scenes in Swallowing Darkness, when Merry uses the hands of Flesh and Blood to heal wounded and dying soldiers who have fallen protecting her, showing that for every dark power there is a light use for it.

== Means of communication Used by characters ==
- By Mirror: The first type of magical communication shown (with possible exception of mention of Queen Andais's ability to hear anything said in the dark). Method is achieved by coating a mirror with your own personal power or magic and willing the communication via a spell (spell not specified in book). In-text, it would seem communication is achieved by speaking the other person's name, and willing communication. Text shows that there are variations on theme, such as using a smooth, still pool, shiny blade, or pool of blood. Also, Doyle places a spell so that they can choose when communication commences, instead of instantaneous connection. See scrying, specifically hydromancy.
- By Blade: Using essentially the same principle as communication by mirror, by applying blood and breath, communication between two people can be established by calling them by name. Communication by this method was used between Merry and Kurag in A Caress of Twilight (Merry Gentry #2) and Merry and Rhys in A Stroke of Midnight (Merry Gentry #4). See scrying.
- By Dream (or Vision): Generally accomplished through connection with God or Goddess, always magic or mystic communication type. In fact, the God and Goddess are the only people or beings that use this method due to their immense magical ability and influence. Usual methods of induction are either the Ring or Chalice. Examples of this type of communication are the Goddess's repeated messages to Sidhe men and Merry that they need to have sex in order to regain old powers, and Merry's vision of soldiers in Iraq in Divine Misdemeanors (Merry Gentry #8). See Oneiromancy and Visions.

== Books ==
1. A Kiss of Shadows (2000)
2. A Caress of Twilight (2002)
3. Seduced by Moonlight (2004)
4. A Stroke of Midnight (2005)
5. Mistral's Kiss (2006)
6. A Lick of Frost (2007)
7. Swallowing Darkness (2008)
8. Divine Misdemeanors (Dec 2009)
9. A Shiver of Light (Jun 2014)
