= Merry Gentry (series) =

Book series by Laurell K. Hamilton

- A Kiss of Shadows; A Caress of Twilight; Seduced by Moonlight; A Stroke of Midnight; Mistral's Kiss; A Lick of Frost; Swallowing Darkness; Divine Misdemeanors; A Shiver of Light
- Author: Laurell K. Hamilton
- Country: United States
- Language: English
- Genre: Horror, Erotica, Urban Fantasy
- Publisher: Del Rey
- Published: 2000–present

The Merry Gentry series is a series of urban fantasy novels by New York Times bestselling author Laurell K. Hamilton. The series is told through the lens of the titular character Meredith "Merry" Gentry, a faerie princess turned private investigator in a world where faeries exist and are known to the general public. The first book in the series, A Kiss of Shadows, was released by Del Rey on October 3, 2000. There are currently ten books in the series (November 2026).

On July 15, 2025, Hamilton announced that the tenth Merry Gentry was in production.

In an interview with Time magazine, Hamilton said that she saw the protagonist, Merry Gentry, as a way of exploring a character who "is totally comfortable with their sexuality" as opposed to the character of Anita Blake in her Anita Blake: Vampire Hunter series.

== Synopsis ==
The series follows Princess Meredith NicEssus a.k.a. "Merry Gentry", a faerie princess that is forced to flee the court of her aunt Andais, the Queen of Air and Darkness and of the Unseelie fae. The first novel takes place after Merry has spent several years outside of her aunt's court out of fear of death via court sanctioned duels. Merry is soon brought back to the Unseelie Court and given the option to take her aunt's throne, but only if she can procreate before her sadistic cousin Cel can. She is allowed to take several of Andais's court guards with her and through the course of the series gains more lovers that are drawn to her side through love, friendship, power, promises for protection, and/or bargains struck with other magical creatures. Merry eventually gets involved in a series of secrets and court intrigues as she discovers that both of the rulers of the Seelie and Unseelie courts are potentially infertile, something that has the potential to keep both the followers in each court from producing new fae children. At the end of Divine Misdemeanors Merry becomes pregnant with twins, but has formed her own informal court, complete with lands and grounds that she has not fully investigated. She has also alienated herself from both the Seelie and Unseelie Courts, as she was responsible for the death of her cousin Cel of the Unseelie Courts and filed charges against her uncle Taranis, the ruler of the Seelie Court, for rape.

== Books in the series ==
1. A Kiss of Shadows (2000) ISBN 978-0-345-42340-5
2. A Caress of Twilight (2002) ISBN 978-0-345-47816-0
3. Seduced by Moonlight (2004) ISBN 978-0-345-44359-5
4. A Stroke of Midnight (2005) ISBN 978-0-345-44360-1
5. Mistral's Kiss (2006) ISBN 978-0-345-44361-8
6. A Lick of Frost (2007) ISBN 978-0-345-49591-4
7. Swallowing Darkness (2008) ISBN 978-0-345-49593-8
8. Divine Misdemeanors (2009) ISBN 978-0-345-49596-9
9. A Shiver of Light (2014) ISBN 978-0-425-25566-7
10. A Glimmer of Death (2026) ISBN 978-0-593-63787-6
11. A Ghost of Daylight (2027)

== Reception ==
Critical reception for the Merry Gentry series has been mixed to positive. The earlier novels in the series received predominantly positive reviews while later novels in the series such as Divine Misdemeanors were criticized for having a "too simply resolved conclusion".
