= Jamal Jumá =

Iraqi-Danish poet and writer

Jamal Jumá, born in Baghdad, is an Iraqi poet and writer. Since 1984, he has lived in Denmark. He has a Bachelor of Arts in Arabic literature from University of Basrah and a Candidate degree in Semitic Philology from the University of Copenhagen. He was an Arabic literature lecturer at the Center of Oriental Studies at the University of Vilnius.

== Life and career ==
He has published several collections of poetry, including Book of the Book (1990), A Handshake in the Dark (1995), and Diary of the Sleepwalker (1998). His work has been translated to several languages.

He has also edited and published numerous manuscripts of Erotica, including The Perfumed Garden, A Promenade of the Hearts, and The Forbidden Texts. This infuriated some religious and political establishments around the Arab World, resulting in the confiscation and banning of these books in all Arab countries. Besides he has translated several works by Danish poets and authors into Arabic, among them Jens Fink-Jensen, Bo Green Jensen, Johannes V. Jensen, Janus Kodal and Niels Lyngsø.

Jamal Jumá achieved his first and major cultural breakthrough internationally when famous British composer Michael Nyman set to music a good number of poems from his collection A Handshake in the Dark. The choral work was commissioned by the BBC and premiered by the BBC Symphony Chorus and BBC Symphony Orchestra on 8 March 2007 at the Barbican Hall, London, with John Storgards as conductor.

== Books and anthologies ==
- Book of the Book
- Iraqi Poetry Today

== Articles ==
- Rafed Khashan: Diary of Sleepwalker
- Nahrain Al-Mousawi: Iraqi Memory in Three Poems
- The Sunday Times: How a family trauma inspired an Iraqi poet
- Michael Nyman: A Handshake in the Dark
- Amir Taheri: An Iraqi Poet Finds a New Language, Amir Taheri

== See also ==
- Iraqi art
- List of Iraqi artists
