= Meredith Gentry =

Meredith Gentry may refer to:

- Merry Gentry (series), a series of books by Laurell K. Hamilton where this is the pseudonym of central character Meredith NicEssus
  - Merry Gentry, the main character in the series
- Meredith Poindexter Gentry (1809–1866), U.S. politician
