= Edward Lacey =

Edward Lacey may refer to:

- Edward A. Lacey (1938–1995), Canadian poet
- Edward S. Lacey (1835–1916), American politician

== See also ==
- Eddie Lacy (born 1990), American football running back
