= Divine Misdemeanors =

2009 novel by Laurell K. Hamilton

- Author: Laurell K. Hamilton
- Language: English
- Series: Merry Gentry
- Genre: Horror, Erotica, Fantasy novel
- Publisher: Ballantine Books
- Publication date: December 2009
- Publication place: United States
- Media type: Print (hardcover)
- Preceded by: Swallowing Darkness
- Followed by: A Shiver of Light

Divine Misdemeanors (December 8, 2009) is the eighth novel in the Merry Gentry series written by Laurell K. Hamilton. The book was one of the top selling novels of 2009.

== Plot ==
Divine Misdemeanors follows the character of Meredith NicEssus, princess of faerie, also known as Merry Gentry. Having succeeded in her goal to become pregnant before her cousin Cel, Merry has declined the Unseelie throne and is attempting to live peacefully with her men and court while dealing with continued court intrigue and the paparazzi. This is made more difficult when a series of brutal murders rips through the area, with the Grey Detective Agency being asked to take part in the investigations and to send Merry in particular. Meanwhile, Merry is having to deal with the stress of leading a large group of fey outside of the Seelie and Unseelie courts.

== Reception ==
Publishers Weekly wrote that Divine Misdemeanors was "full of steamy sex and wild magic" but that "newcomers will be lost, and mystery fans may feel the sex scenes crowd out the plot", although "veterans of the series will no doubt enjoy their return to Hamilton's meticulously constructed world." Booklist stated that the novel's mystery "starts out with great page-turner potential, then struggles to overcome some heavy personal drama, only to fizzle out in a too simply resolved conclusion" but that overall Divine Misdemeanors "rebounds as new conflicts emerge within Merry’s clan as their faerie powers grow". RT Book Reviews gave the novel 4 1/2 stars, praising the book's characters.
