= Seduced by Moonlight =

Book by Laurell K. Hamilton

- First edition cover
- Author: Laurell K. Hamilton
- Language: English
- Series: Merry Gentry
- Genre: Horror, erotic, fantasy novel
- Publisher: Ballantine
- Publication date: February 3, 2004
- Publication place: United States
- Media type: Print (Hardback & Paperback)
- Pages: 384 pp
- ISBN: 0-345-44356-X
- OCLC: 53880178
- Dewey Decimal: 813/.54 22
- LC Class: PS3558.A443357 S43 2004
- Preceded by: A Caress of Twilight
- Followed by: A Stroke of Midnight

Seduced by Moonlight is the third novel in the Merry Gentry series by American writer Laurell K. Hamilton.

== Plot introduction ==
A faerie princess turned private investigator in a world where faeries are not only known to the general public, but are also fashionable, the title heroine is Princess Meredith NicEssus, also known as Merry Gentry. As niece to Andais, The Queen of Air and Darkness, she is a royal of the Unseelie Court. While her aunt tried to kill her as a child, she has since offered her the title as crown princess as the Court needs more heirs.

== Plot summary ==
Seduced by Moonlight begins shortly after the events of A Caress of Twilight. Kurag, Goblin King, is insisting upon proof that Kitto has become sidhe following sex with Merry. She offers an extra month of their alliance for every goblin hybrid she can bring into sidhe magic.

During the discussions, Siun, Kitto's nightmarish, spidery former mistress, appears and he is terrified. It is revealed that Rhys also swore blood price on her, as it was she that took his eye when he failed to "glow" for her during sex. In his fear, Kitto accidentally uses the Hand of Reaching to open a portal through the mirror. Siun falls through and is trapped half-way, and after some negotiation, Kurag allows the Ravens to do what they like. Kitto viciously wounds her, and Rhys kills her with a sword.

It is revealed that Meredith is a vessel for the Goddess Danu when she inadvertently brings the pregnant Maeve Reed back into her god-head, and gives Frost newfound god status (which he is not comfortable with). The cup or cauldron also reappears after Merry has a dream about it, an effect that has significant impact upon the sidhe who believed it lost forever.

During sex with Merry many of her lovers suffer unexpected side-effects:

- Rhys is brought back into his god-head
- Frost is brought into his god-head
- Sage is turned into a full-sized sidhe
- Nicca is possessed by Dian Cecht
- Doyle regains his shape-shifting abilities (turning into a dog and a horse), plus ones he never had previously (an eagle).

Merry and her lovers return to the Courts. Upon the flight back, Merry is presented with the Queen's ring by Rhys. This is not only a symbol of her status as heir, but also a potent artifact in its own right. It was known as the happy ever after ring as it permitted sidhe to find their perfect mates.

When they arrive at the airport they are greeted by several of the Queen's Ravens as well as human policemen. The Queen has insisted that Merry take to her bed any of the sidhe that the ring recognises. A short while after their arrival, they attend a press conference. A policeman is bewitched and shooting breaks out. Merry is saved by Frost and others of the Ravens.

Yet more Ravens await Merry at the sithen. The Queen insists that Merry beds two out of the four before she appears before her. The result is the appearance of a spring, from which Merry fills a cup. Andais, apparently insane with bloodlust, is attacking her men. The Ravens attempt to intervene and protect one another. Merry uses her Hand of Blood to draw wounds upon her aunt. The Green Man then gives Merry the ability to heal all those in the room.

It is discovered that a spell was used to incite the Queen to murder. The plot was hatched by those amongst the court who feared that a mortal Queen, Merry, would result in the sidhe ceasing to exist. Merry is challenged by one, Miniver, and they duel before the court. Meredith is declared the winner.

== Characters in Seduced by Moonlight ==
=== Major characters ===
Seduced by Moonlight features the following major characters.

- Andais - Queen of Air and Darkness, Merry's aunt, the sister of Essus, and mother of Cel. Andais is a war goddess, and the sadistic Queen of the Unseelie Court. Ruler of the male guard The Ravens. Although she is a sadist and is widely believed to be insane, Andais appears to have the best interests of the Court somewhat at heart, and has sworn to abdicate her throne in favor of whichever of Cel or Merry can demonstrate themselves capable of producing new sidhe children. Her consort is Eamon.
- Barinthus/Manannan Mac Lir - A sea god and one of the Queen's Ravens, Barinthus is one of the most powerful members of the Courts. He was long known as the "Kingmaker" for his involvement in the selection of court rulers, and supported first Essus, now Merry for the Unseelie throne. Queen Andais fears that Barinthus may make an attempt for the throne himself, and he is the only member of the guards Andais has forbidden Merry to have reproductive intercourse with, for fear that Barinthus would become Merry's consort and the Unseelie King. Barinthus recently had some of his powers returned via metaphysical sex with Merry, and has become a member of Merry's guard. See Manannan mac Lir.
- Doyle - Captain of The Ravens, once the Queens Darkness now part of Merry's guard, and included in her many lovers, Part Sidhe, part Hellhound (Gabriel Ratchet, et al.), part phouka.
- Frost - Raven, The Killing Frost, second in command. Was revealed that started life as Jacqual Frosti, Jack Frost, etc., is prejudiced against Seelie Court due to poor treatment at court because the other nobles were jealous of Frost's remaining in power due to his power in the minds of the humans. Has tendency to pout. See Jack Frost.
- Galen - The youngest of the Ravens, Merry's best friend. Lineage is half-pixie and half Unseelie sidhe. Powers include subtle ability to have everyone like him. Extremely unpolitical, naive and idealistic, is voice of childhood reasoning for Merry. Unfortunately, letting go of those ideals is allowing Merry to survive.
- Kitto - Goblin/sidhe hybrid, Seelie sidhe mother raped during goblin wars, snake-type goblin.
- Meredith NicEssus/Merry Gentry - Title heroine, Princess of Flesh and Blood, Daughter of Essus
- Nicca - Raven and Spy for Andais in Merry's home. Lineage is half-demifey and half Seelie Sidhe. Is apparently Cornish, due to being of Bucca-Dhu's Line (Revealed in Caress of Twilight) Has sprouted wings since wing-tattoos sprung out of back via sex with Merry. Was possessed by Dian Cecht, due to jealousy. Was cured via divine intervention.
- Rhys/Cromm Cruach - Raven, former God of Death. Film Noir buff. Was called Gwynfor "white lord of ecstasy and death" by Sage, 2nd hand has been seen when he killed Siun (Goblin) after Kitto hacked Siun to pieces. In Merry's dream, it is shown that Rhys will get both eyes back, apparently has magical hammer that can heal, raise armies of the dead. However, we are not sure whether dream was of past or future. See Crom Cruach.

=== Other characters ===
Recurring characters include:

- Abeloec - Sidhe warrior and Raven. Drunkard. is referred to as Abe mostly in the next book.
- Adair - Raven, Agricultural deity
- Amatheon - Raven, Sidhe Warrior,
- Ash - Goblin/Sidhe Hybrid, Skin is "Sun-kissed", displaying Seelie lineage, but culturally and morally, according to Merry, very much a goblin. He wants very badly to gain sidhe magic powers so he can have power undreamed of to the goblins. Remains to be seen how much his brothers’ (Holly) hatred toward the sidhe will have an effect on Ash's chances towards this.
- Barry Jenkins - Human reporter.
- Black Agnes - Night Hag. Part of the Sluagh.
- Briac - Raven. Usually known as Brii. Plant deity.
- Creeda - Queen of the Goblins.
- Eamon - Andais' consort.
- Fflur - Sidhe. Healer.
- Hawthorne - Raven.
- Holly - Goblin/Sidhe Hybrid, Skin is "Sun-kissed", displaying Seelie lineage, but culturally and morally, according to Merry, very much a goblin. His brother (Ash) wants very badly to gain sidhe magic powers so he can have power undreamed of to the goblins. Remains to be seen how much his hatred toward the sidhe will have an effect on Ash's chances towards this.
- Ivi - Raven
- Jonty - Red Cap
- Kurag - King of Goblins, Merry's ally. Was ally of Merry's father previous to his death.
- Madeline Phelps - Publicist to the Unseelie Court
- Maeve Reed/Conchenn - Former Goddess of Spring. Exiled from Faerie, now a Hollywood actress. Husband Gordon (deceased) was able to give her a child due to Merry and Galen performing a fertility ritual.
- Mistral - Raven. The Master of Winds, the Bringer of Storms.
- Maelgwn - Sidhe. Known as the Wolf Lord as he and most of his House are shapeshifters.
- Major Walters - Human police officer
- Niceven - Queen of the Demi-fey
- Sage - Demi-fey who answers to Queen Niceven, sent to be with Merry as part of alliance between her and the demi-fey.
- Segna the Gold - Night Hag. Part of the Sluagh.
- Sholto - Raven and King of the Sluagh. Sidhe/Nightflyer hybrid. Called Shadowspawn behind his back. Fears being regulated to being the Queen's Creature, similar to Killing Frost and Darkness. Has made deal with Merry to form alliance, yet to be consummated, desperately wants sidhe flesh. Merry is unsure whether she can handle Sholto's "extras" (tendrils that Sholto normally hides with glamour. Merry could not handle them in the first book)
- Taranis - King of the Seelie court, known officially as the King of Light and Illusion, Merry's uncle, rumored to be the reason why the Sidhe don't have any children anymore. See Taranis.
- Tyler - Andais' human pet.
- Usna - Raven. His mother was made pregnant by another Sidhe's husband and the betrayed wife turned her into a cat. He later killed the Sidhe who cursed her, but was kicked out of the Seelie Court because of doing so.

Non-recurring characters include:

- Afagdu
- Carrow - Raven, one of the Great Hunters.
- Kongar - Red Cap
- Miniver - Sidhe. Head of House. Formerly Seelie Court. Arrested after attempting to kill Merry in a duel to third blood.
- Nerys - Sidhe, head of a neutral House
- Onilwyn - Raven, Sidhe Warrior
- Siun - A spider-like goblin. Kitto's former Mistress. Had previously raped Rhys and taken his eye.

The death toll in Seduced by Moonlight includes:

- Nerys - Executed in front of court after pleading guilty about giving the wine to Andais
- Siun -Took Rhys's eye when he did not "glow" for her when he was forced to bed her. She was also killed by Kitto and Rhys after Kitto uses his new hand of reach to trap her in a mirror.

== Major themes ==
- The need for Merry to become pregnant by one of her Guards.
- Faerie politics, both within the Unseelie Court and between the Seelie and Unseelie Courts.
- The increase in powers of both Merry and her men.
- Merry's connection to the Goddess and the use of sex to bring about magical change.

== Allusions/references to other works ==
- The powers of the ring Merry was given by Andais is revealed to be the source of Cinderella and other human fairy tales when it is described as the Happy Ever After Ring.
- Galen compares Rhys to Frankenstein's monster, from the novel Frankenstein by Mary Shelley, for his desire to have Merry strap him down and run electricity over his skin during sex.
- Rhys plays upon the phrase from the movie To Have and Have Not (1945) by Lauren Bacall ("You know you don't have to act with me, Steve. You don't have to say anything and you don't have to do anything. Not a thing. Oh, maybe just whistle. You know how to whistle, don't you, Steve? You just put your lips together and blow.") when he says, "you know how to kiss don't you? you just put your lips together..."

== Reception ==
- Locus: "new developments bring a welcome sense of direction to this series"
- Kirkus: "Steamy embraces wispily laced together"
- Publishers Weekly: "Hamilton's trademark mix of the personal and emotional along with the sexual will as usual delight her fans."
- Science Fiction Chronicle: "the story is slow paced and the occasionally inventive sexual encounters aren't exciting enough to make up for the flagging storyline."
- Library Journal: "In addition to sex, there is interminable conversation and explication about who, where, why, and how to have sex. Almost no plot movement takes place until late in the book"
- Scholar Sylvia Kelso states that with the introduction of the goddess Danu, "Hamilton has actually constructed something very close to a fully-functioning sociologist's model of a religion"
