= Seelie =

Fairies in Scottish folklore

Seelie (or Seely) is from the Scots term seelie meaning "happy", "lucky" or "blessed" applied to fairy beings in Scottish folklore in phrases such as seely wights or The Seelie Court. Despite their name, the seelie folk of legend could be morally ambivalent and dangerous like humans can be. Calling them "seelie," similar to names such as "good neighbors," may have been a euphemism to ward off their anger. The seelie court is composed of a lot of fairies that have shown non-malevolent tendencies, and a lot of them showed friendliness to humans--as evident in Scottish folklore. In folklore, a lot of fairies of seelie court have helped humans that they like.

== Etymology ==
The word seely (var. seily, seelie, sealy) is the adjective form of Scots language sele, seel, from Old Scots sele 'good fortune, bliss', cognate to Middle English sele and Old English sǣl (Note: cf. gesǣlig.) of the same meaning. Also cognate with Old High German sâlig (Note: Modern German: selig; cf. hypothetical ancestor Proto-West Germanic *sālīg.) and thus related to the English "seely" which has been given similar meaning. The Modern Standard English word "silly" also descends from the word "seely". (Note: The OED 1st edition makes no mention of "seely court" as combined form.)

The antonym, unseely (also unsall, unsell) means "unhappy", "misfortunate" or "unholy."

== Seelie wights ==
Many Scottish ballads and tales tell of "Seilie wichts" or "wights," meaning blessed beings. Julian Goodare theorized that these were legendary nature spirits, similar to but distinct from fairies. Goodare additionally hypothesized that there was a sixteenth-century shamanistic cult centering around these beings, comparable to the Italian Benandanti and doñas de fuera. One of the earliest pieces of evidence comes from the sixteenth-century theologian William Hay, who complained of witches and local pagans claiming to meet with fairy-like women called "celly vichtys." The name is also similar to the Swiss-German "Sälïgen Lütt."

== Seelie and Unseelie courts ==
The Seelie Court is a group of fairies, often specified as good fairies who contrast with the wicked Unseelie Court. As described by British folklorist Katharine Mary Briggs, the Seelie Court were those fairies who would seek help from humans, warn those who have accidentally offended them, and return human kindness with favors of their own. Still, a fairy belonging to this court would avenge insults and could be prone to mischief. They gathered in courts or troupes. Despite being known for non-malevolent tendencies, the fairies of the Seelie court will generally still punish any human that offends or upset them.

Conversely, the Unseelie Court were the darkly inclined fairies who would attack without provocation, although not every member of the court invariably did so. Briggs equated the Unseelie fey with the Sluagh (who abducted travelers at night and fired elf-shot) as well as the shellycoat, nuckelavee, redcaps, baobhan sith, and various other wicked fairies from English, Scottish and Irish lore. The fairies of the Seelie Court denied being equated to these beings and stated they are different from them. Though the Edinburgh Magazine calls them the 'Unseelie Court', Briggs does not use this term.

The "seely court" is mentioned in the ballad of "Allison Gross," where they play a benevolent role. "Allison Gross" was recorded from Anne or Anna Gorden of Aberdeen, Scotland, sometime around 1783. The seely court is also named in at least one fragmentary version of "Tam Lin," where they are more negative figures.

== Welsh folklore ==
A possible equivalent to the Scottish "seelie" appears in the Welsh "sili," used in some individual fairy names. In a Welsh tale, "Sili go Dwt" was the name of a Rumpelstiltskin-like fairy whose name had to be guessed. In a possibly related fragmentary story, a fairy woman was heard singing the words "sili ffrit" while she spun thread. Sir John Rhys found that "sili ffrit" was sometimes used as a term for a child of the Tylwyth Teg or for anything small.

Rhys proposed that "sili" came from the English "silly" (in this sense meaning happy) and "ffrit" from "fright," thus a term for a ghost. The term would have come to Wales via the Welsh Marches. He also suggested that "Sili go Dwt" was a corruption of English fairy names featuring the syllable "tot" (such as Tom Tit Tot).

== See also ==
- Classifications of Fairies
