= Fatimid rock crystal amulets =

Fatimid amulets in the 9th century

Rock crystal amulets in the Islamic world date back to the 9th century CE and were used to offer well-being and religious protection. A range of forms and materials were used to produce amulets and to bring upon various powers and protections. Rock crystal amulets physically connect a person to magic and religion through significant qualities of their materials and inscriptions. The inscriptions on rock crystal amulets ranged from long to short phrases, or just single words, indicating their unique personalization.

Rock crystal appears to have been a popular material for the production of amulets in the medieval Islamic world. Many objects made of rock crystal, such as ewers and drinking vessels, were being produced in the Fatimid Caliphate during the late medieval era, and it is not surprising that rock crystal amulets are often linked to the Fatimids. Within the context of the Fatimid Caliphate, strong associations between rock crystal and water, tied to the former’s transparency and ability to refract light, may have made the material particularly appropriate for amulets whose function was bringing rain. This is further supported by the existence of a few amulets bearing text that references water or features calls for rain.

== Material significance of rock crystal ==
Classical Arab writers such as al-Biruni and Ahmad ibn Usuf al-Tifashi believed rock crystals to be frozen or congealed water because of how close their resembled water. Due to this belief, Fatimids considered the rock crystal to be a solid and tangible embodiment of water and its powerful qualities. In Islamic culture, water was considered very pure because it embodies all elements of life. This resemblance between crystal to water gave it qualities of its purity, which further connected it to the belief of Paradise. The idea of this Paradise is mentioned in the Quran (37;45-66) stating that at paradise a person “will be passed to them a cup from a clear flowing fountain, crystal-white of a taste of devious to those who drink.” In order to obtain full qualities of water they must have the highest quality of rock crystal its characteristics must be “limpid and transparent, of the strongest white, free from cracks”.

As a result of these powerful qualities associated between material and religious properties, Fatimid caliphs in Egypt from 969-1171 sought after rock crystal. The crystal was used for everyday objects such as lamps and bowls, but the translucent qualities brought difficulty while craving these objects. However, this quality contributed to its religious connotations. The light that shown through the rock crystal lamps was attributed to life like qualities that shown through the object. Vessels made of the material often held holy water or were tied to magical healing properties, that if a king were to drink from would bring him good. Because of its inherent magical and healing properties the rock crystal was used for amulets.

== Function ==
The function of rock crystal amulets is derived from their fabrication process, specifically the material they are made up of and inscriptions. Amulet inscriptions can hold negative and positive powers, which affects the way in which people interact with them. For example the function of a reversed print amulet could act as a stamp, where the phrase could be printed and its relief would appear correctly on a surface. In contrast, when the amulet acts as a seal it is performing protection or authentication to both the owner of the amulet and the receiver of the seal. Religious inscriptions either from the Quran or directional phrases would inform the amulets specific effect. Concise phrases written on an amulet are rare as it suggests a specific result for its user. In cases of non Quranic inscription, the nuance of the phrase would be capable of suppressing pain, aiding in well being, or healing the person to which it touches. More commonly Quranic verses or Shi’s Imams were inscribed as a vast form of protection. Early usage of the amulets are seen evident in various inscriptions of ‘praising god’, some dating back before the Bismallah Additionally the material of rock crystal amulets is extremely significant as it directly implements material connectivity to its function.

== Use of rock crystal in rain prayer amulets ==
Calling down rain was one of many apotropaic capabilities attributed to amulets in the Islamic World. In the Fatimid Caliphate, rock crystal as a material may have been seen as particularly suited to endow amulets with this power. British Art Historian Venetia Porter, who has written extensively on this topic, argued that rain-prayer amulets would likely have been popular among the Fatimids due to the prevalence of droughts in that region, which had at times been disastrous. The association between the Fatimid rock crystal amulets and rain prayers is supported by the fact that such talismans occasionally feature references to rain and water in their inscriptions, which Porter cites as one of very few recurring elements or points of consistency among these objects. Ludvik Kalus was the first to draw attention to this connection. A rock crystal amulet featured in the collection of the Bibliotheque Nationale in France, cataloged by Kalus in 1981, is a notable example which is inscribed with an explicit call for rain. Kalus roughly translates the start of the first line as “bring down the rain to us.” The rest of the first line is left untranslated. The second line features a set of four letters whose significance is uncertain. The third and final line reads “bring down the rain.”
