= Classifications of fairies =

Fairies, particularly those of Irish, English, Scottish and Welsh folklore, have been classified in a variety of ways. Classifications – which most often come from scholarly analysis, and may not always accurately reflect local traditions – typically focus on behavior or physical characteristics.

== Early classifications of fairies ==
Germanic lore featured light and dark elves (Ljósálfar and Dökkálfar). This may be roughly equivalent to later concepts such as the Seelie and Unseelie.

In the mid-thirteenth century, Thomas of Cantimpré classified fairies into neptuni of water, incubi who wandered the earth, dusii under the earth, and spiritualia nequitie in celestibus, who inhabit the air.

In 1566, John Walsh of Devonshire – on trial for witchcraft – said that there were three kinds of "feries": white, green and black.

The sidhe in celtic mythology are also known as fairies.

== Good and evil ==
=== Seelie and Unseelie Courts ===
In Scottish folklore, faeries are divided into the Seelie Court and the Unseelie Court. D. L. Ashliman notes that this may be the most famous division of fairies.

The Seelie Court is described to comprise fairies that seek help from humans, warn those who have accidentally offended them, and return human kindness with favors of their own. Still, a fairy belonging to this court would avenge insults and could be prone to mischief.

The Unseelie Court describes the darkly-inclined fairies. Unlike the Seelie Court, no offense was deemed necessary to bring down their assaults. In Scotland, they were seen as closely allied with witches.

=== In other cultures ===
In French fairy tales told by the précieuses, fairies are divided into good and evil, but the effect is literary. Many of the literary fairies seem preoccupied with the character of the humans they encounter.

Regarding Irish lore, Lady Wilde identified two groups of fairies: a gentle type fond of "music and dancing," and an evil group allied with the devil. Another collector, Lady Gregory, gave a similar summary that there was a tall, playful race of sidhe, and a small, malicious race.

The Japanese yōkai and the Arabic djinn have often been compared to European fairies, as all three traditions feature supernatural beings that coexist with humanity, possess ambiguous moral alignments, and frequently interact with the human world.

== Trooping and solitary ==
William Butler Yeats, in Fairy and Folk Tales of the Irish Peasantry, divided fairies into the Trooping Fairies and the Solitary Fairies. Trooping fairies live in communities and are known for singing and dancing. They may or may not be friendly to humans. Solitary fairies, who live on their own, are more likely to be harmful. Leprechauns and banshees are solitary fairies. Katharine Mary Briggs noted that a third distinction might be needed for "domesticated fairies" who live in small family groups.

== Other characteristics ==
=== Cornish fairies ===
Robert Hunt divided the fairies of Cornwall into five classes: the Small People; the Spriggans; the Piskies; the Buccas, Bockles, or Knockers; and the Brownies. This approach drew criticism from other scholars, such as Henry Jenner, who argued among other points that "bockle" and "brownie" were not native Cornish names. Multiple folklorists after Hunt made their own categories for Cornish fairies, but none agreed on types or number.

=== Welsh fairies ===
Wirt Sikes formally divided Welsh fairies, or Tylwyth Teg, into five general types: the Ellyllon (elves), the Bwbachod (household spirits similar to brownies and hobgoblins), the Coblynau (spirits of the mines), the Gwragedd Annwn (lake maidens), and the Gwyllion (mountain spirits resembling hags).

== Challenges of classification ==
Folklorists such as Simon Young and Ronald James have cautioned against over-categorization. Although folk belief had many names and types of supernatural beings, James pointed out that definitions were often fluid, and that trying to hold to strict definitions when working with folk informants often led to frustration and confusion.

However, categorization serves a practical purpose. Wirt Sikes acknowledged that while such classifications are largely arbitrary and it is impossible to fully categorize fairies, "the student of folklore must classify his materials distinctly in some understandable fashion, or go daft."

== See also ==
- Álfheimr
- Changeling
- Elf
- Fairyland
- Otherworld
- Pixie
- Puck (mythology)
- Sleih beggey
- Sluagh
