= Mistral's Kiss =

2006 novel by Laurell K. Hamilton

- First edition
- Author: Laurell K. Hamilton
- Cover artist: Judy York
- Language: English
- Series: Merry Gentry
- Genre: Horror, Erotica, Fantasy novel
- Publisher: Ballantine Books
- Publication date: December 12, 2006
- Publication place: United States
- Media type: Print (Hardcover)
- Pages: 384 pp
- ISBN: 0-345-44358-6
- OCLC: 70660263
- Dewey Decimal: 813/.54 22
- LC Class: PS3558.A443357 M57 2006
- Preceded by: A Stroke of Midnight
- Followed by: A Lick of Frost

Mistral's Kiss is the fifth novel in the Merry Gentry series by Laurell K. Hamilton, and was released December 12, 2006.

== Plot introduction ==
The series has revolved around a conflict between title character, faerie princess Meredith NicEssus, and her cousin, Cel. Cel's mother, Queen Andais, has promised that the first of the two cousins to produce a child will become ruler of the Unseelie Court. Mistral's Kiss continues to follow Meredith's attempts to bear a child and to avoid Cel's various schemes.

== Plot summary ==
Meredith wakes up from a dream where she is given a horn cup from the Consort. The horn is a lost relic belonging to Abeloec, one of her guards, and the former god of wine. Abeloec and Merry drink from the horn, and some of his former god powers are restored. The other guards receive tattoos, symbols of their former god-powers that link the guards to Meredith in a mysterious way.

They are magically transported to the heart of the Unseelie sithen, the dead gardens, where sex with Meredith, Abeloec and Mistral causes the gardens to come alive again. Rain begins to fall inside the garden.

Through the sex magic, Galen, Nicca and Aisling disappear into the earth, air and trees, apparently as sacrifices to bring the magic back. Merry discovers that the Sithen responds to her desires, like adjusting how much rain falls in the garden. Merry learns that Abeloec's cup was once used to make queens and goddesses, and the group speculate as to whether Merry is now immortal.

Meredith asks the sithen to create a door to return to the Unseelie sithen. When they go through it, they find that they have accidentally passed into the Sluagh sithen, and they end up in the dead garden of the Sluagh. Before they can escape, they are confronted by Sholto, King of the Sluagh, and Lord of That Which Passes Between, and his two night hags, Agnes and Segna. Meredith discovers that Sholto's tentacles have been shaved off by a member of the Seelie who tricked him. The hags believe that Meredith is part of the conspiracy. Segna attacks Meredith, but before she can reach her, Sholto strikes her and throws her into the dead lake, where is she is speared by the enchanted bones of the dead. Segna is mortally wounded, but alive. Sholto and Meredith wade into the lake to euthanize Segna. In a last-ditch attempt to kill Meredith, Segna pulls her under the water. Meredith uses her Hand of Blood to finish Segna.

Sholto and Meredith magically appear on the Island of Bones in the middle of the lake. Sholto carries a dagger and a spear of bone, signs of kingship among the sluagh that had been lost. The Goddess appears and gives Sholto the chance to restore magic to the Sluagh. He is given the choice to either bring the magic back with blood by killing Meredith, or by sex. If he chooses death, the black heart of the sluagh will be restored. But if he chooses sex and life, it will change the sluagh sithen to a more Seelie-like place. Sholto chooses sex and life, and together they restore magic to the Sluagh garden. In a blast of power, they are returned to the Sluagh garden which is now filled with herbs, plants and flowers.

Drunk with his new power, Sholto calls the Wild Hunt to chase the sidhe. Meredith and her guards flee. Meredith conjures a protective covering of four-leaf clover and discovers a "thin place" that allow them to escape the Sluagh sithen. Now more sidhe than ever, Sholto is attacked by the very Wild Hunt that he called up, and he is forced to flee as well.

Now in the real world, Meredith calls on a group of Red Caps (cousins of the goblins), led by Jonty, to fight the Wild Hunt with them. The Wild Hunt is defeated and through the remaining magic, faerie animals including dogs appear.

After the battle, they are rejoined by Galen, Aisling and Nicca who, having disappeared from the garden, reappeared in the Hall of Mortality. Galen's wild magic causes flowers and water to appear in the Hall, and he accidentally causes all prisoners to be freed, including Cel, the Queen's son, who wants Meredith dead. A furious Andais confronts Meredith and tells her that she must take her guards and go back to Los Angeles tonight, because she has ruined her sithen and Andais cannot keep her safe from Cel.

== Characters in "Mistral's Kiss" ==
=== Major characters ===
- Meredith NicEssus/Merry Gentry - Title heroine, Princess of both courts, Wielder of the hands of flesh and blood, Daughter of Essus
- Mistral - Title character. Raven. The Master of Winds, the Bringer of Storms.

=== Other characters ===
Recurring characters include:

- Andais - Queen of Air and Darkness, Merry's aunt, the sister of Essus, and mother of Cel. Andais is a war goddess, and the sadistic Queen of the Unseelie Court. Ruler of the male guard The Ravens, recently revealed as barren. Although she is a sadist and is widely believed to be insane, Andais appears to have the best interests of the Court somewhat at heart, and has sworn to abdicate her throne in favor of whichever of Cel or Merry can demonstrate themselves capable of producing new sidhe children. Her consort is Eamon.
- Doyle - Captain of The Ravens, was once the Queen's Darkness and former chief assassin. He is now part of Merry's guard, and included in her many lovers. He is part Sidhe, part Hell-Hound (Gabriel Ratchet, et al.), part phouka and was once Nodons, a god of healing. Merry realizes in this book that Doyle is the one she would choose as her king.
- Frost - Raven, The Killing Frost, second in command. Was revealed he started life as Jacqual Frosti, Jack Frost, etc., is prejudiced against Seelie Court due to poor treatment at court because the other nobles were jealous of Frost's remaining in power due to his continued presence in the minds of humans. Has tendency to pout. Has recently come into godhead via Merry. Says recent powers used to belong to one he called master. See Jack Frost.
- Galen - The youngest of the Ravens, Merry's best friend. Lineage is half-pixie and half Unseelie sidhe. Powers include subtle ability to have everyone like him. Extremely apolitical, naive and idealistic, is voice of childhood reasoning for Merry. Unfortunately, letting go of those ideals is allowing Merry to survive. Mistranslation of a prophecy given from human prophet to Cel almost got Galen killed, as allies of Cel tried to assassinate Galen to prevent the prophecy.
- Kitto - Goblin/sidhe hybrid, Seelie sidhe mother raped during goblin wars, snake-type goblin, given full sidhe status via sex with Merry, has Hand of Reaching.
- Nicca - Raven and Spy for Andais in Merry's home. Lineage is half-demifey and half Seelie Sidhe. Is apparently Cornish, due to being of Bucca-Dhu's Line (Revealed in Caress of Twilight) Has sprouted wings since wing-tattoos sprung out of back via sex with Merry. Is destined to be father of child with Biddy, formerly of Cel's Guard, via matchmaking ring. Was possessed by Dian Cecht, due to jealousy. Was cured via divine intervention.
- Rhys/Cromm Cruach - Raven, former God of Death. Film Noir buff. Was called Gwynfor "white lord of ecstasy and death" by Sage, 2nd hand has been seen when he killed Siun (Goblin) after Kitto hacked Siun to pieces. In Merry's dream, it is shown that Rhys will get both eyes back, apparently has magical hammer that can heal, raise armies of the dead. However, we are not sure whether dream was of past or future. See Crom Cruach.
- Sholto - Raven and King of the Sluagh. Sidhe/Nightflyer hybrid. Called Shadowspawn behind his back. Fears being relegated to being the Queen's Creature, similar to Killing Frost and Darkness. Desperately wants sidhe flesh. Merry is unsure whether she can handle Sholto's "extras" (tentacles that Sholto normally hides with glamour—Merry could not handle them in the first book). Sholto makes a deal with Merry to form an alliance, which is consummated in Mistral's Kiss and which awakens the Wild Hunt.

Non-recurring characters include:

- Abeloec - Sidhe warrior and Raven. A drunkard, once an ancient god of wine and beer. Brought back into his power as a "sovereign god"—one who can bestow the power of sovereignty to the queen.
- Agnes - Hag. Part of the Sluagh. Sister of Segna. Appears to be the most jealous of Sholto's harem. Also known as "Black Agnes." Originally met in Kiss of Shadows.
- Fyfe - Goblin/Nightflyer hybrid. Part of the Sluagh. Uncle of Sholto.
- Ivar - Goblin/Nightflyer hybrid. Part of the Sluagh. Uncle of Sholto.
- Segna - Hag. Part of the Sluagh. Sister of Agnes. Also known as "Segna the Gold."

== Major themes ==
- Drastic changes occurring in the land of faerie.
- The need for Merry to become pregnant by one of her Guards.
- Faerie politics, both within the Unseelie Court and between the Seelie and Unseelie Courts.
- The increase in powers of both Merry and her men.
- Merry's connection to the Goddess and the use of sex to bring about magical change.
- The awakening of the heart of the Unseelie Court.
- The awakening of the Wild Hunt.

== Critical reception ==
- Mandi Bierly of Entertainment Weekly graded Mistral's Kiss as a "C+", writing that the novel "reads sorta like fan fiction" and that although "everyone will enjoy the marathon, 40-page opening sex scene", "we'd love to see her lead men (or goblins) into battle with more than just her sex appeal."
- In the St. Louis Post-Dispatch, J. Stephen Bolhafner wrote a more uniformly positive review, observing that "Fans of Laurell K. Hamilton's brand of erotic fantasy will delight in this book . . . . If you haven't been following the Merry Gentry series, you'll probably be lost, but that may not deter you from being captured by Hamilton's seductive charms and inspired to buy all her books."

== Release details ==
- 'Mistral's Kiss' by Laurell K. Hamilton. Published December 12, 2006. Ballantine Books. ISBN 0-345-44358-6
