= Swallowing Darkness =

2008 novel by Laurell K. Hamilton

- Author: Laurell K. Hamilton
- Language: English
- Series: Merry Gentry
- Genre: Horror, Erotica, Fantasy novel
- Publisher: Ballantine Books
- Publication date: 4 November 2008
- Publication place: United States
- Media type: Print (Hardcover)
- Pages: 384 pp
- ISBN: 978-0-345-49593-8
- OCLC: 192080540
- Dewey Decimal: 813/.54 22
- LC Class: PS3558.A443357 S93 2005
- Preceded by: A Lick of Frost
- Followed by: Divine Misdemeanors

Swallowing Darkness (2008) is the seventh novel in the Merry Gentry series written by Laurell K. Hamilton.

== Plot ==
Swallowing Darkness follows the further adventures of Princess Meredith "Merry Gentry" NicEssus. Merry has finally succeeded in getting pregnant. Having done so before her cousin Cel could impregnate one of his women, she will be able to claim the Unseelie throne from her aunt Andais as long as she successfully carries her twin babies to term and gives birth. This news makes her a target for many of the fae who are unhappy with the idea of Merry gaining the throne, forcing Merry's royal guard to become more cautious about her security. Meanwhile, Merry is still reeling from the sexual attack from her uncle Taranis, King of the Seelie court, as well as with the loss of her lover Frost. To make matters worse, Taranis claims that he was the one who impregnated Merry.

Audiobook narrated by Claudia Black

== Reception ==
Publishers Weekly praised Swallowing Darkness, stating "The dreamy development of the surrealistic fey world puts this installment well above its predecessors; a tidy ending will leave fans wondering whether it concludes the series." RT Book Reviews gave the novel 2 stars, stating that "descriptions of clothing, hair and eyes take precedence over story; random objects of power appear fortuitously; and Merry and her guards take time to process their emotions while running for their lives. Some may enjoy this volume; others may prefer something with more meat on its bones."
