= Queen of Darkness =

Queen of Darkness may refer to:

== Fictional characters ==
- Eclipsa the Queen of Darkness, a character in the television series Star vs. the Forces of Evil
- Queen Darkness, a character in Peter Pan: The Animated Series
- Takhisis, a fictional goddess of evil in the Dragonlance setting

== Songs ==
- "Queen of Darkness", a song by Tony Banks from Bankstatement (1989)
- "Queen of Darkness", a song by Badfinger from Head First (2000)
- "Queen of Darkness", a song by Shonen Knife from Genki Shock! (2006)

== Other uses ==
- "Enter Merla: Queen of Darkness", an episode of Voltron
- Queen of the Darkness, a 2000 novel by Anne Bishop

== See also ==
- Queen of Air and Darkness (disambiguation)
