= A Lick of Frost =

2007 novel by Laurell K. Hamilton

- Ballantine 2007 Cover
- Author: Laurell K. Hamilton
- Language: English
- Series: Merry Gentry
- Genre: Horror, Erotica, Fantasy novel
- Publisher: Ballantine Books
- Publication date: October 23, 2007
- Publication place: United States
- Media type: Print (hardcover)
- Pages: 350 pp
- ISBN: 0-345-49590-X
- OCLC: 148892229
- Preceded by: Mistral's Kiss
- Followed by: Swallowing Darkness

A Lick of Frost is the sixth book in the Merry Gentry series by Laurell K. Hamilton.

== Plot ==
=== Prologue ===
A faerie princess turned private investigator in a world where faeries are not only known to the general public, but are also fashionable, the title heroine is Princess Meredith NicEssus, also known as Merry Gentry. As niece to Andais, The Queen of Air and Darkness, she is a royal of the Unseelie Court. While her aunt tried to kill her as a child, she has since offered her the title as crown princess as the Court needs more heirs.

=== Summary ===
A Lick of Frost begins one month after the events of Mistral's Kiss. The opening chapters show Merry and her guards Rhys, Galen, Doyle, Frost, and Abeloec in a conference room, being questioned about the charges of rape against Rhys, Galen, and Abeloec. King Taranis has brought the charges on behalf of the woman allegedly raped by the aforementioned fey. The meeting ends badly, with Taranis losing what little control he had on his sanity, and one of the officers of Taranis' guard, Sir Hugh, telling Merry that he is going to force a vote among the nobles of the Seelie court to choose a new king, and he wants Merry to take Taranis' place.

When Merry and her guards get home after taking a trip to the hospital (as Doyle and Abe got badly hurt from Taranis' attack), they call Aunt Andais to tell her of all that has happened- specifically the offer to rule the Seelie Court. Andais believes Merry already agreed to rule and abuses one of her guards (Crystall) in a sadistic rage. Eventually, Merry and her men convince Andais otherwise, but she still continues to abuse the guard in reaction to many of them leaving to join Merry. The series of mirror-calls end, and Merry finalises the coming together of her, Ash, and Holly for later that night.

Night comes and Holly and Ash arrive, along with all of the Red Caps in tow. Jonty, a Red Cap that helped Merry fight in Mistral's Kiss, sheds a tear as Merry tells him she would bring the Red Caps into their power. She catches the tear on her finger and consumes it. This brings on the remaking of Maeve Reed's house into a sithen. Those of faerie who stand in that room with no faerie dog to keep them grounded, crumple to the floor. Some of the crumpled men are revived by one of the dogs, but Frost stays down.

The creation of the sithen (faerie land) allows the ring of fertility on her finger to flare to life and Merry realises that she is pregnant with twins. Each twin has three fathers like in the story of Ceridwen. A phantom image of Merry's children appear by their respective fathers, Rhys, Frost, Galen, Doyle, Mistral, and Sholto. There is also a dimmer phantom image of a 3rd child (that has the potential to be born after the twins).

Frost turns out to be the sacrificial king for the creation of the new sithen. Merry prays for him not to die, and he turns into a white stag and runs off. Merry runs to one of the gardens of her sithen to be alone and grieve the loss of Frost. While out there, Taranis (using illusion to appear as one of her guards) knocks her out and takes her to his bedroom back at the Seelie Court. It is assumed that he rapes her, and then believes he fathers her children. Hugh, some others at the Seelie Court, and Doyle (in dog form) sneak her out of the bedroom and into a press conference where she tells the press that Taranis made the Seelie woman (Lady Catarin) believe that it was Rhys, Galen, and Abe who raped her. However, it was all just an illusion of Taranis' making and the woman was in fact raped by other Seelie nobles working with him. Merry also tells them that she is pregnant, and that Taranis kidnapped and raped her.

The book ends with Merry in an ambulance with Doyle, continuing to mourn Frost and her current situation. She is on her way to the hospital to treat the concussion she received from Taranis and to take a rape test.
