= A Handshake in the Dark =

A Handshake in the Dark is an anti-war choral piece by Michael Nyman, based on texts by the Iraqi poet Jamal Jumá, an exiled poet living in Denmark, and constitutes a series of imaginary letters to his younger brother, a conscript captured by the Americans and whose whereabouts were long unknown. The poetry graphically describes the pain and loss felt before the brother’s eventual release. The piece was premiered by the BBC Symphony Chorus and Orchestra on 8 March 2007 at the Barbican Hall, London.
