= Laurell K. Hamilton =

American fantasy and romance writer

Laurell Kaye Hamilton
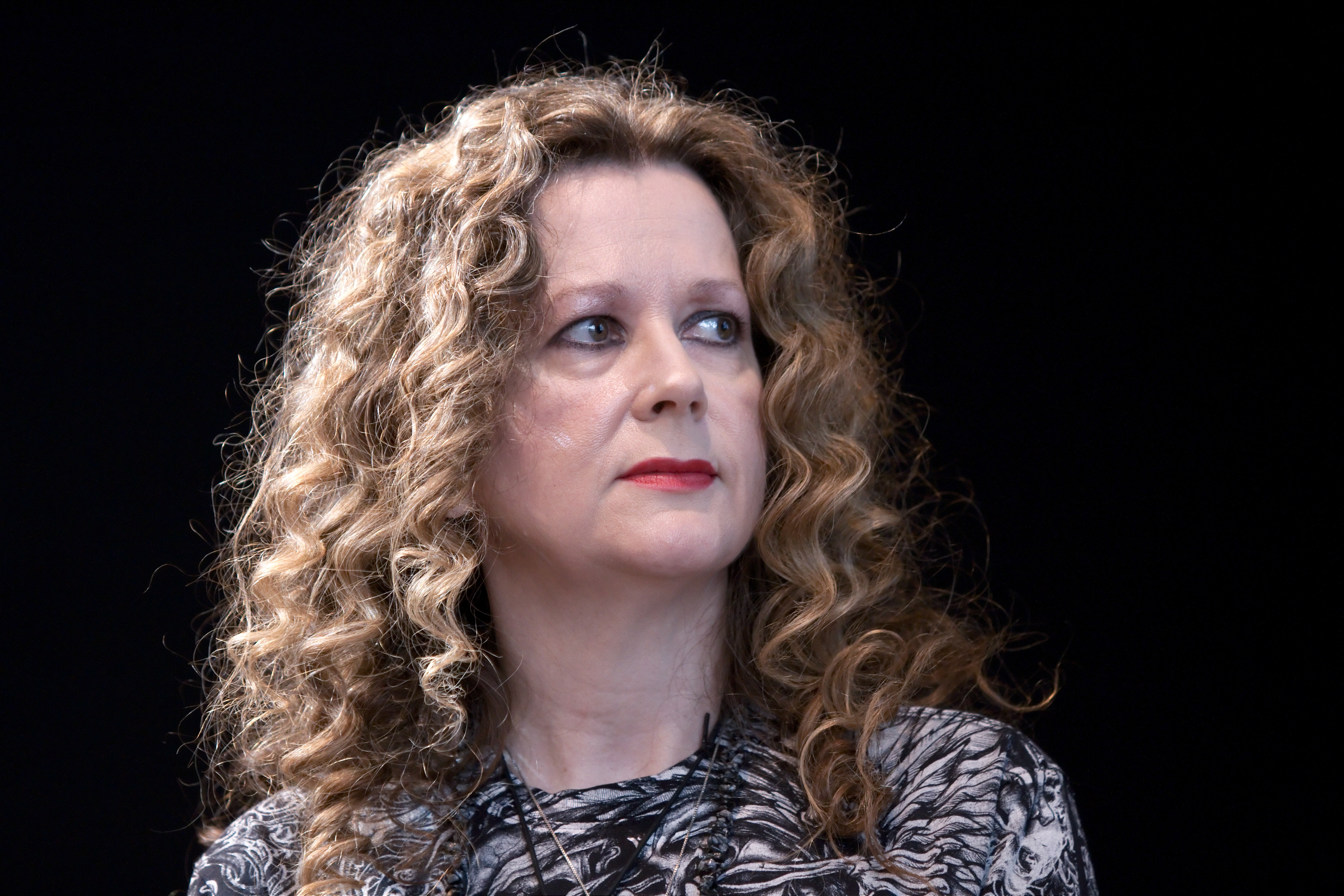
- Born: Laurell Kaye Klein; February 19, 1963 (age 63); Heber Springs, Arkansas, U.S.
- Education: Indiana Wesleyan University
- Occupations: Writer, Novelist
- Spouse(s): Gary Hamilton (divorced); Jonathon Green
- Children: 1
- Writing career
- Period: 1993–present
- Genres: Fantasy, Erotica, Romance, Horror, Science fiction
- Notable works: Anita Blake: Vampire Hunter; Merry Gentry series
- Website: Official website

Laurell Kaye Hamilton (born February 19, 1963) is an American fantasy and romance writer, who is best known as the author of two series of stories.

Her New York Times-bestselling Anita Blake: Vampire Hunter series centers on Anita Blake, a professional zombie raiser, vampire executioner and supernatural consultant for the police, which includes novels, short story collections, and comic books. Six million copies of Anita Blake novels are in print. Her Merry Gentry series centers on Meredith Gentry, Princess of the Unseelie court of Faerie, a private detective facing repeated assassination attempts. Both of these fantasy series follow their protagonists as they gain in power and deal with the dangers of worlds in which creatures of legend live.

USA Today, Entertainment Weekly, and Time have identified her works as significant contributions to the development of the urban-fantasy genre.

== Personal life ==
Laurell Kaye Hamilton was born Laurell Kaye Klein in Heber Springs, Arkansas but grew up in Sims, Indiana with her grandmother Laura Gentry. Her education includes degrees in English and biology from Marion College (now called Indiana Wesleyan University), a private Evangelical Christian liberal arts college in Marion, Indiana that is affiliated with the Wesleyan Church denomination. She met Gary Hamilton, whom she married, there. They have one daughter together, Trinity.

Hamilton is involved with a number of animal charities, particularly supporting dog rescue efforts and wolf preservation.

Hamilton lives in St. Louis County, Missouri, with her daughter Trinity, and husband Jonathon Green whom she married in 2001.

== Works ==
Laurell K. Hamilton is the author of two major book series, spin-off comic books, various anthologies, and other stand-alone titles. Hamilton's long-time editor was well-known fantasy editor Susan Allison at Penguin Group publishing company. Hamilton's works include:

- Anita Blake: Vampire Hunter is an animator and necromancer who raises the dead for a living. She is also a vampire executioner and in later books a U.S. Marshal. Blake lives in a fictional St. Louis where vampires and were-animals exist and recently gained some rights as citizens. As of November 2013, Hamilton has published 22 novels and 5 novellas in the Anita Blake series. As of 2009 more than 6 million copies of Anita Blake novels have been printed and several have become New York Times bestsellers.
- Anita Blake comics are the comic-book renditions of the Anita Blake series. As of May 2012, the comic-book series has included her first three books, Guilty Pleasures, Laughing Corpse and Circus of the Damned. There was also a special prologue comic issued named, "The First Death".
- Merry Gentry is a Princess of Faerie and a private investigator. She is constantly dodging assassination attempts while juggling life in the "real world" where everyone knows faeries exist. As of 2026, there have been a total of ten novels in the Merry Gentry series.

== Reception ==
Entertainment Weekly and USA Today have identified Hamilton as having a significant impact on urban fantasy. In 2008, Time declared that the popularity of the genre "owes everything to Laurell K. Hamilton". Authors Courtney Allison Moulton and Kelly Gay have noted Hamilton as an inspiration.

=== Anita Blake ===
Reader reaction to the series's shift in tone from crime noir thriller to focus more predominantly on the sexual themes in the series has been mixed, starting with Narcissus in Chains when the main character of Anita Blake becomes infected with the ardeur. The ardeur is a supernatural power inadvertently given to Anita by her vampire Master Jean-Claude that gives her massive amounts of power but also demands that she have sexual intercourse with several different people through the course of a day, sometimes in large groups. Reception to these dynamics and to the usage of sexual abuse in later books has been mixed, with some reviewers commenting that the character of Anita spent too much time "obsessing about whether or not she's a slut" while others remarked that the erotic themes enhanced the series. In response to these comments, Hamilton issued a blog entitled "Dear Negative Reader" where she addressed a growing number of readers on the Internet that were expressing disappointment in the series's changes. In the blog Hamilton told the readers that "life is too short to read books you don't like" and that if they found that the current subject matter pushed "you past that comfortable envelope of the mundane" then "stop reading" and speculated that some of the readers were either "closet readers" or comment based on others' opinions. The blog entry was negatively received by some readers.

Critical reviewers have also commented on the amount of sex in later books, as in a 2006 review in The Boston Globe of Micah. The review was largely negative, stating "we were not impressed. Hamilton no doubt appeals to romance and erotica lovers, but it does not take long for the clichés and the constant droning about sex to become tiresome." Other reviewers for The Kansas City Star and Publishers Weekly also commented on the rise in sexual themes in the series. The reviewer for the Kansas City Star stated that "After 13 erotically charged books, boredom has reared its ugly head for the 14th novel in Laurell K. Hamilton's Anita Blake series, as eroticism becomes mere description..." and Publishers Weekly commented that Blood Noir had a "growing air of ennui, which longtime readers can't help sharing as sex increasingly takes the place of plot and character development".

In contrast, a Denver Post review of Danse Macabre took a more positive view of the eroticism in Hamilton's work. Although it noted that "[t]hose looking for mystery and mayhem on this Anita adventure are out of luck" it also stated that "the main attraction of the Anita Blake novels in the past five years has been their erotic novelty", and "[f]ew, if any, mainstream novels delve so deeply into pure, unadulterated erotica".

== Bibliography ==
=== Anita Blake: Vampire Hunter ===
1. Guilty Pleasures (1993) ISBN 978-0-515-13449-0
2. The Laughing Corpse (1994) ISBN 978-0-425-19200-9
3. Circus of the Damned (1995) ISBN 978-0-515-13448-3
4. The Lunatic Cafe (1996) ISBN 978-0-425-20137-4
5. Bloody Bones (1996) ISBN 978-0-425-20567-9
6. The Killing Dance (1997) ISBN 978-0-425-20906-6
7. Burnt Offerings (1998) ISBN 978-0-515-13447-6
8. Blue Moon (1998) ISBN 978-0-515-13445-2
9. Obsidian Butterfly (2000) ISBN 978-0-515-13450-6
10. Narcissus in Chains (2001) ISBN 978-5-558-61270-7
11. Cerulean Sins (2003) ISBN 978-0-515-13681-4
12. Incubus Dreams (2004) ISBN 978-0-515-13975-4
13. Micah (2006) ISBN 978-0-515-14087-3
14. Danse Macabre (2006) ISBN 978-0-425-20797-0
15. The Harlequin (2007) ISBN 978-0-425-21724-5
16. Blood Noir (2008) ISBN 978-0-425-22219-5
17. Skin Trade (2009) ISBN 978-0-425-22772-5
18. Flirt (2010) ISBN 978-0-425-23567-6
19. Bullet (2010) ISBN 978-0-425-23433-4
20. Hit List (2011) ISBN 978-0-425-24113-4
21. Kiss the Dead (2012) ISBN 978-0-425-24754-9
22. Affliction (2013) ISBN 978-0-425-25570-4
23. Jason (2014) ISBN 978-0-515-15607-2
24. Dead Ice (2015) ISBN 978-0-425-25571-1
25. Crimson Death (2016) ISBN 978-1-101-98773-5
26. Serpentine (August 7, 2018) ISBN 978-0-425-25568-1
27. Sucker Punch (August 4, 2020) ISBN 978-1-984-80443-3
28. Rafael (February 9, 2021) ISBN 978-0-593-33291-7
29. Smolder (March 21, 2023) ISBN 978-1-984-80449-5
30. Slay (November 7, 2023) ISBN 978-0-593-63784-5

==== Anita Blake novellas and short stories ====
- Those Who Seek Forgiveness (2006)
  - published as part of Strange Candy, number 00.5
- The Girl Who Was Infatuated with Death (2006)
  - published as part of Strange Candy, number 08.5
- Beauty (2012) ISBN 978-1-101-57930-5
  - novella, number 20.5
- Dancing (2013) ISBN 978-0-698-15643-2
  - novella, number 21.5
- Shutdown
  - short story; unofficially and temporarily released October 2013
  - not yet formally published, book number 21.75
- Wounded (December 2016)
  - novella, number 24.5
- "Sweet Seduction"
  - short story/novelette; collected in Noir Fatale, May 2019
- Zombie Dearest (2020)
  - novella, number 26.5
  - short story/novelette; collected in "Fantastic Hope", April 2020 ISBN 978-0-593-09920-9

==== Marvel Comics series ====
(in Anita's chronological order)

1. Laurell K. Hamilton's Anita Blake, Vampire Hunter: The First Death 1–2 (7 & 12/2007)
2. Guilty Pleasures Handbook (2007)
3. Anita Blake Vampire Hunter: Guilty Pleasures 1–12 (12/2006 – 8/2008)
4. Anita Blake: The Laughing Corpse – Animator 1–5 (10/2008 – 2/2009)
5. Anita Blake: The Laughing Corpse – Necromancer 1–5 (4/2009 – 9/2009)
6. Anita Blake: The Laughing Corpse – Executioner 1–5 (9/2009 – 3/2010)
7. Anita Blake: Circus of The Damned – The Charmer 1–5 (5/2010 – 10/2010)
8. Anita Blake: Circus of The Damned – The Ingenue 1–5 (1/2011–ongoing)
9. Anita Blake: Circus of the Damned – The Scoundrel 1–5 (Ongoing)

==== Science Fiction Book Club Omnibus Editions ====
- Club Vampyre
  - Guilty Pleasures
  - The Laughing Corpse
  - Circus of the Damned
- Midnight Cafe
  - The Lunatic Cafe
  - Bloody Bones
  - The Killing Dance
- Black Moon Inn
  - Burnt Offerings
  - Blue Moon
- Nightshade Tavern
  - Obsidian Butterfly
  - Narcissus in Chains
- Out of This World
  - first 100 pages of Narcissus in Chains

=== Merry Gentry series ===
1. A Kiss of Shadows (2000) ISBN 978-0-345-42340-5
2. A Caress of Twilight (2002) ISBN 978-0-345-47816-0
3. Seduced by Moonlight (2004) ISBN 978-0-345-44359-5
4. A Stroke of Midnight (2005) ISBN 978-0-345-44360-1
5. Mistral's Kiss (2006) ISBN 978-0-345-44361-8
6. A Lick of Frost (2007) ISBN 978-0-345-49591-4
7. Swallowing Darkness (2008) ISBN 978-0-345-49593-8
8. Divine Misdemeanors (2009) ISBN 978-0-345-49596-9
9. A Shiver of Light (2014) ISBN 978-0-515-15548-8
10. A Glimmer of Death (2026)
11. A Ghost of Daylight (2027)

=== Others ===
- Nightseer (1992)
- Nightshade (1992)
  - Star Trek: The Next Generation authorized novel #24)
- Death of a Darklord (1995)
  - TSR's Ravenloft series
- Superheroes (anthology, 1995)
  - A Clean Sweep
- Cravings, (anthology, 2004)
  - Blood upon my lips
- Bite (anthology, 2004)
  - The Girl Infatuated with Death
- Strange Candy, (2006)
  - 14 published and unpublished short stories
- Never After (anthology, 2009)
  - Can He Bake a Cherry Pie
- Ardeur: 14 Writers on the Anita Blake, Vampire Hunter Series (2010)
- Dead Ice (2016)
  - Extra chapter in paperback edition
  - Wounded

== Awards ==
1996: International Horror Guild Award (Novel) - Bloody Bones - Nominated

2001: Locus Award (Fantasy) - A Kiss of Shadows - Nominated

2002: Romantic Times (Contemporary Paranormal) - A Caress of Twilight — Nominated

2010: Romantic Times (Career Achievement - Urban Fantasy) — Nominated

2011: Romantic Times (Career Achievement - Urban Fantasy) — Nominated

2011: Goodreads Choice Awards (Paranormal Fantasy) - Hit List - Nominated

2012: Goodreads Choice Awards (Paranormal Fantasy) - Kiss the Dead - Nominated

2013: Goodreads Choice Awards (Paranormal Fantasy) - Affliction - Nominated

2015: Romantic Times (Career Achievement - Urban Fantasy) — Won

== Critical studies, reviews and biography ==
- West, Michelle (Jun 2000). "[Review of Obsidian butterfly]". Musing on Books. F&SF. 98 (6): 41–46. Archived from the original on December 27, 2004.
