= A Stroke of Midnight =

- First edition (US)
- Author: Laurell K. Hamilton
- Cover artist: Judy York
- Language: English
- Series: Merry Gentry
- Genre: Horror, Erotica, Fantasy novel
- Publisher: Ballantine Books
- Publication date: April 12, 2005
- Publication place: United States
- Media type: Print (Hardcover, Paperback)
- Pages: 366
- ISBN: 0-345-44357-8
- OCLC: 58731868
- Dewey Decimal: 813/.54 22
- LC Class: PS3558.A443357 S77 2005
- Preceded by: Seduced by Moonlight
- Followed by: Mistral's Kiss

A Stroke of Midnight is the fourth novel in the Merry Gentry series by Laurell K. Hamilton.

== Plot introduction ==
A faerie princess turned private investigator in a world where faeries are not only known to the general public, but are also fashionable, the title heroine is Princess Meredith NicEssus, also known as Merry Gentry. As niece to Andais, The Queen of Air and Darkness, she is a royal of the Unseelie Court. While her aunt tried to kill her as a child, she has since offered her the title as crown princess as the Court needs more heirs.

== Plot summary ==
Following on almost immediately from the events of Seduced by Moonlight, A Stroke of Midnight begins with Merry and the Ravens attending a press conference in the sithen. This is highly unusual as the home of the sidhe is usually off-limits to the human press. However, it is felt that it is more secure than holding the conference elsewhere.

This opinion is challenged almost immediately by the deaths of Beatrice, one of the lesser fae, and a human reporter. Merry, assigned to solve the murders by her aunt, Queen Andais, opts to bring in human forensics in the hope that science might be able to succeed where magic has so far failed - and bring a murderer to justice.

The entire novel takes place within approximately one day.
