= René R. Khawam =

Syrian translator

René Rizqallah Khawam (1917 in Aleppo, Ottoman Empire – 22 March 2004 in Paris, France) was a Syrian translator, foremost known for his translations of the Qur'an, One Thousand and One Nights, The Perfumed Garden and Ahmad al-Tifashi's A Promenade of the Hearts.

Khawam was born to a Christian family of Caucasian origins. He studied French at a Marist Brothers institution in Syria and, in 1947, he moved to France to work as a teacher of French. Khawam dedicated the last forty years of his life to the study and translation of classical Arabic manuscripts. As a non-Muslim translator of the Qur'an, he was a proponent of closer dialogue between Abrahamic religions.
