= A Kiss of Shadows =

2000 novel by Laurell K. Hamilton

- First edition
- Author: Laurell K. Hamilton
- Language: English
- Series: Merry Gentry
- Genre: Horror, erotica, fantasy
- Publisher: Ballantine Books
- Publication date: October 3, 2000
- Publication place: United States
- Media type: Print (Hardcover, Paperback), audiobook
- Pages: 435
- ISBN: 0-345-42339-9
- OCLC: 44849075
- Dewey Decimal: 813/.54 21
- LC Class: PS3558.A443357 K57 2000
- Followed by: A Caress of Twilight

A Kiss of Shadows is an erotic horror novel by American writer Laurell K. Hamilton, the first book in the Merry Gentry series.

== Plot introduction ==
A faerie princess turned private investigator in a world where faeries are not only known to the general public, but are also popular, the heroine is Princess Meredith NicEssus. As niece to Andais, The Queen of Air and Darkness, she is a royal of the Unseelie Court, however having fled the court three years before she has been hiding herself under the name of Merry Gentry and working as a private investigator for the Grey Detective Agency.

== Plot summary ==
The story begins in Los Angeles, California, in a world where magical creatures are "out of the closet" and, in some cases, even legal. Princess Meredith NicEssus is working for the Grey Detective Agency under the assumed name of Meredith 'Merry' Gentry. When two women come to the agency with a story about fey-wannabes and rituals involving fey women, Merry goes undercover to investigate. However, she and her colleagues get more than they bargained for when it is discovered that the culprit is using Branwyn's Tears, an illegal oil that can make a human appear as a sidhe (pronounced 'shee') lover for a night, and turn even a sidhe or a sidhe-descendant into his sexual slave.

In the process of solving the case, Merry's secret is revealed, and she is hunted by the demonic Sluagh. Brought to see their King, Sholto, he offers Meredith a deal. Himself disapproved of by Andais, Queen of Air and Darkness, because of his mixed blood, he proposes an alliance between the two of them. Jealous at the idea of Merry becoming his lover, Sholto's harem of nighthags attack Merry. During the fight Merry's gift, the Hand of Flesh, is revealed when one of them, Nerys, turns into a ball of flesh.

Shocked, Merry tries to flee, but is trapped. Doyle, Captain of the Queen's Raven Guard, appears. He announces that the Queen never sent the Sluagh, and that in fact the Queen meant her no harm. As proof of this he produces the Queen's sword Mortal Dread, as well as the Queen's mark, which he transfers to Merry in a kiss.

Merry returns with Doyle to the Court. The Queen claims that she wants her bloodline to continue upon the throne. She is willing to take as her heir whichever of Meredith or her cousin, Cel, can first produce an heir. She lifts the geiss of celibacy upon her Ravens for Meredith alone, insisting that she choose at least three in order to increase the chance of pregnancy.

While this offer would permit Merry to end her self-imposed exile and return home, it also brings dangers. Cel, previously the sole heir, makes several attempts upon her life. Merry makes alliances with others such as Kurag, the Goblin King.

However, Cel was behind the Branwyn's Tears incident in LA. In punishment, he is to be confined for six months after being coated with the oil himself, something akin to torture.
