= Sheikh Nefzaoui =

Sheikh Mohamed Al-Nefzaoui
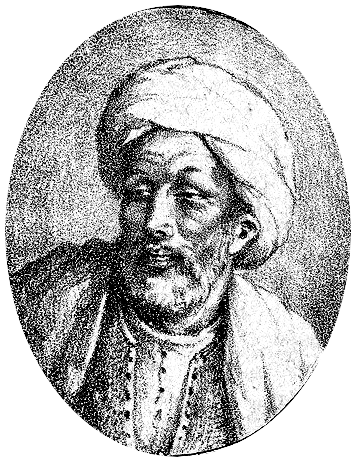
- Born: Nefzaoua, Hafsid Sultanate
- Occupation: Writer
- Years active: 15th century
- Notable work: The Perfumed Garden
- Style: Erotic literature

Cheikh Mohamed Al-Nefzaoui was a 15th century Arabic language erotic writer who originates from the Nefzaoua Berber tribe in the Nefzaoua region.

== The Perfumed Garden ==
Around the 1420s, at the request of the Hafsid sultan, he writes The Perfumed Garden, a manual on eroticism. This book enjoys a reputation in the Muslim world comparable to that of One Thousand and One Nights.
