= Queen of Air and Darkness =

Queen of Air and Darkness may refer to:

== Characters ==
- A character in a poem from A. E. Housman's Last Poems, III (1922)
- Andais, a character in the Merry Gentry novel series by Laurell K. Hamilton
- Moire, a character in the novel The Element of Fire by Martha Wells
- A title of Mab, the Faery Queen of Winter, a character in The Dresden Files series by Jim Butcher
- Queen of Air and Darkness (Dungeons & Dragons), a deity in the Dungeons & Dragons game
- Queen of Air and Darkness, a character in the novel War for the Oaks by Emma Bull
- Title of the character Cassie in the novel The Delirium Brief by Charles Stross

== Works ==
- The Queen of Air and Darkness, a 1939 novel by T. H. White, second volume of The Once and Future King
- The Queen of Air and Darkness (novella), a 1971 novella by Poul Anderson in his History of Rustum universe
- Queen of Air and Darkness (Clare novel), a 2018 dark fantasy novel by Cassandra Clare

== Other uses ==
- "Queen of Air and Darkness", a track on the Cauda Pavonis album Pistols at Dawn

== See also ==
- Queen of Darkness (disambiguation)
