= A Caress of Twilight =

2002 novel by Laurell K. Hamilton

- First edition
- Author: Laurell K. Hamilton
- Cover artist: David Stevenson
- Language: English
- Series: Merry Gentry
- Genre: Horror, Erotica, Fantasy novel
- Published: March 26, 2002 (Ballantine Books)
- Publication place: United States
- Media type: Print (Hardcover, Paperback)
- Pages: 326 pp
- ISBN: 0-345-43527-3
- OCLC: 49323472
- Dewey Decimal: 813/.54 21
- LC Class: PS3558.A443357 C37 2002
- Preceded by: A Kiss of Shadows
- Followed by: Seduced by Moonlight

A Caress of Twilight is the second novel in the Merry Gentry series by American writer Laurell K. Hamilton.

== Plot introduction ==
A faerie princess turned private investigator in a world where faeries are not only known to the general public, but are also fashionable, the title heroine is Princess Meredith NicEssus, also known as Merry Gentry. As niece to Andais, The Queen of Air and Darkness, she is a royal of the Unseelie Court. While her aunt tried to kill her as a child, she has since offered her the title as crown princess as the Court needs more heirs.

== Plot summary ==
A Caress of Twilight begins a few months after the events of A Kiss of Shadows. It is December, and Merry and the Sidhe warriors she has chosen as her lovers have returned to Los Angeles, California. Merry has resumed working for the Grey Detective Agency and several of the Sidhe have also joined the payroll.

Merry is approached by Maeve Reed, previously known as Conchenn before her exile from the Seelie Court and now a famous Hollywood actress. Maeve asks Merry to perform a fertility rite that will permit her to have a child by her dying human husband. In return, she tells the princess that the reason for her exile was that she had refused to become the wife of Taranis, King of Light and Illusion, because she believed he was sterile.

Galen, badly injured by the demi-fey during A Kiss of Shadows, has yet to heal, despite the usually phenomenal healing abilities of a sidhe warrior. Merry approaches the Queen of the Demi-Fey, Niceven, regarding a cure. The price of the cure and an alliance is a weekly drink of Merry's blood by a surrogate to be chosen by Niceven.

During Merry's first night in bed with Doyle, they are interrupted by Andais who reveals that the Nameless has been freed. The worst of both courts, the Nameless was the last great spell that Seelie and Unseelie had cooperated upon. They had stripped themselves of everything too awful for them to be permitted to stay in the United States, and from it had been formed the Nameless.

A strange murder brings members of the Grey Agency, including Merry, to the scene. However, their presence is challenged by others of the police force and they are thrown off site. However, this is not before they have a chance to suspect that supernatural forces are at work. It is suspected that the lives had been sucked from the murder victims by the ghosts of dead gods. Nothing is said to the police, however, as the only known person to work such a spell was a sidhe and, if it were discovered, that fact could result in all sidhe being banished from the country.

Healed from his injuries by Niceven's representative, Sage, Galen acts the part of the Green Man in the fertility ritual with Merry which results in Maeve Reed becoming pregnant.

It begins to become clear that Taranis is also planning something as various social secretaries insist upon Merry attending first the Yule Ball and then a feast in her honour. This culminates in a conversation between Merry and Taranis himself.

Finally, the Nameless attacks Maeve Reed's home. It is finally defeated by Merry and her companions, Merry herself showing for the first time her second Hand of Power - the Hand of Blood. The result of the destruction of the Nameless is the release of the magics which formed it; these magics transfer themselves to the victors, who begin to exhibit unforeseen side effects.

== Characters ==
=== Major characters ===
A Caress of Twilight features the following major characters.

- Andais - Queen of Air and Darkness, Merry's aunt, the sister of Essus, and mother of Cel. Andais is a war goddess, and the sadistic Queen of the Unseelie Court. Ruler of the male guard, The Ravens, she is a sadist and is widely believed to be insane. However, Andais appears to have the best interests of the Court somewhat at heart, and has sworn to abdicate her throne in favor of whichever of Cel or Merry can demonstrate themselves capable of producing new sidhe children. Her consort is Eamon.
- Doyle - Captain of The Ravens, once the Queens Darkness now part of Merry's guard, and included in her many lovers, part Sidhe, part Hell-Hound (Gabriel Ratchet, et al.), part phouka.
- Frost - Raven, The Killing Frost, second in command. He is prejudiced against Seelie Court due to his poor treatment at court, the other nobles being jealous of Frost remaining in power due to his power in the minds of the humans. Has a tendency to pout. See Jack Frost.
- Galen - The youngest of the Ravens and Merry's best friend. His lineage is half-pixie and half Unseelie sidhe. His powers include the subtle ability to have everyone like him. Extremely unpolitical, naive and idealistic, he is the voice of childhood reasoning for Merry. Unfortunately, letting go of those ideals is allowing Merry to survive.
- Kitto - Goblin/sidhe hybrid, his Seelie sidhe mother was raped during the goblin wars by a snake-type goblin.
- Meredith NicEssus/Merry Gentry - Title heroine, Princess of Flesh and Blood, Daughter of Essus
- Nicca - Raven and Spy for Andais in Merry's home. Lineage is half-demifey and half Seelie Sidhe
- Rhys/Cromm Cruach - Raven, former God of Death and film noir buff. See Crom Cruach

=== Other characters ===
Recurring characters include:

- Jeremy Grey - Owner of the Grey Detective Agency, Trowe
- Lucinda Tate - Human detective
- Maeve Reed - Formerly the goddess Conchenn and exile from the Seelie Court
- Niceven - Queen of the Demi-Fey
- Sage - Demi-fey and representative of Queen Niceven
- Taranis - King of Light and Illusion
- Teresa - Employed by the Grey Detective Agency

Non-recurring characters include:

- Bucca-Dhu - The last of the pure-blood Bucca-Gwidden, a Cornish sidhe
- Ethan Kane - Human bodyguard and partner in Kane and Hart
- Gordon Reed - Human husband of Maeve Reed who is dying
- Hedwick - Social secretary to King Taranis
- Jeffery Maison - Human employed by Maeve Reed
- Julian Hart - Partner in Kane and Hart, and twin brother of Jordan
- Lieutenant Petersen - policeman
- Marie - Maeve Reed's personal assistant
- Max Corbin - Human bodyguard
- Rosmerta - King Taranis' main social secretary

== Major themes ==
- The need for Merry to become pregnant by one of her Guards
- Faerie politics, both within the Unseelie Court and between the Seelie and Unseelie Courts
- The increase in powers of both Merry and her men

== Allusions/references to other works ==
- Rhys tries to persuade Merry to sing "We're Off to See the Wizard" from The Wizard of Oz when they go outside to join Maeve Reed by the pool.
- Rhys sings the theme songs to Magnum, P.I. and Hawaii Five-O while at the murder scene.
- Rhys' love of film noir and Humphrey Bogart is mentioned on several occasions.
