= The Perfumed Garden =

15th-century Arabic erotic literature by Muhammad ibn Muhammad al-Nefzawi

- Cover of The Perfumed Garden
- Author: Muhammad ibn Muhammad al-Nafzawi
- Original title: الروض العاطر في نزهة الخاطر
- Translator: Sir Richard Francis Burton (first English translation)
- Language: Arabic
- Genre: Erotic literature
- Published: 15th century
- Publication place: Tunisia
- English publication date: 1886
- Media type: Print
- Pages: 82 (Kegan Paul International edition)
- ISBN: 0-7103-0644-X

The Perfumed Garden of Sensual Delight (Arabic: الروض العاطر في نزهة الخاطر Al-rawḍ al-ʿāṭir fī nuzhaẗ al-ḫāṭir), also known as the Arabic Kama Sutra, is a fifteenth-century Arabic sex manual and work of erotic literature by Muhammad ibn Muhammad al-Nefzawi, also known simply as "Nefzawi". It has been compared to the ancient Indian Kama Sutra.

The book presents opinions on what qualities men and women should have to be attractive and gives advice on sexual technique, warnings about sexual health, and recipes to remedy sexual maladies. It gives lists of names for the penis and vulva, has a section on the interpretation of dreams, and briefly describes sex among animals. Interspersed with these there are a number of stories which are intended to give context and amusement.

== History ==
According to the introduction of Colville's English translation, Muḥammad ibn Muḥammad al-Nafzawi probably wrote The Perfumed Garden sometime during the fifteenth century. Sheikh Nefzawi, full name Abu Abdullah Muhammad ben Umar Nafzawi, was born in the south of present-day Tunisia. He compiled the present work at the request of the Hafsid ruler of Tunis, Abū Fāris ʿAbd al-ʿAzīz al-Mutawakkil. The reputation acquired by this work in the Arab world was similar to that of the Arabian Nights.

== Content of the book ==
The Perfumed Garden is composed of an introduction followed by 21 chapters. Neither the first French translator (an anonymous colonel who styled himself as 'Monsieur le Baron R.') nor Sir Richard Burton (who translated the text from the French version) provides the 21st chapter. In these two translations, the book is about 100 pages long.

=== Introduction ===
The author praises God for having given us the pleasures of sex. He says that God endowed women with beauty to inspire men to have sex with them. He says that men have a natural weakness for the love of women. He says that he is a Muslim, that there is only one God and that Mohammed is his prophet. He says that he is the servant of God. He says that he wrote this book in Tunis for the Grand Vizir. He says that he had divided his work into different chapters to make it easier to read and understand.

=== Chapter 1: The Man of Quality ===
Nefzawi quotes a poem which describes what it is that women desire in a man. These things are described as "youth, health, wealth, and not coming too fast". According to Nefzawi and the quoted poem, a man of high sexual quality has a large and vigorous shaft, possesses thick thighs and is not big bellied. Such a man should be quick to become erect in response to desire, yet slow to spend its passion by ejaculating. After orgasm, his penis is capable of becoming erect soon afterwards. His member is long enough to reach the end of his partner's vagina and large enough to fill it.

Nefzawi suggests pleasant scents can excite women, and with that in mind, he regales the reader with a tale which illuminates the potency of scent in the sensual arts. He tells the story of a scurrilous man called Musaylima and his seduction of Sajah, two figures who are despised in Islamic history as false prophets. Musaylima attempted to fashion scriptures that might resemble the Qur'an and imitate the miracles of healing that occurred at the hands of the Prophet Muhammad, but woefully failed on both counts. According to the story that Nefzawi recounts, Musaylima and Sajah were disturbed that one another were competitors, and so agreed to meet at her invitation. Musaylima is said to have panicked, until he was advised by an old man of his tribe, who suggested that Musaylima set up "a vaulted tent of coloured brocade" in which silks and perfumed waters of "lily, rose, carnation, violet" were spread out, along with censers of "Khymer aloes, ambergris and musk". The tent ropes were then loosened so the perfumes were not overpowering. When Sajah later meets with Musaylima, she is confused and loses her presence of mind in such an environment, whereupon Musaylima seduced her reciting a poem, asking her to lie on her back, or take it bending, squatting or on her hands and knees. Sajah finds his poetry and perfumes desirable and fornicates with him. After the story, the author describes the marriage of Musaylima and Sajah, the humiliating death and defeat of the false prophet Musaylima, and how Sajah later repented of her ways and became a true Muslim.

Nefzawi adds that a man worthy of praise is anxious to please women. He takes care of his appearance; he is truthful and sincere; he is brave and generous; he can be trusted; he is a good conversationalist. However, he does not boast about his relationship with other women.

To illustrate all this, the author tells the story of Bahloul, a buffoon who managed to have sex with Hamdonna, the daughter of the King and the wife of the Grand Vizir. He first seduced her with his words. He then showed her his erected penis, which was strong and large. Upon doing this, she desired him and they had sex. After they had climaxed, he kissed her lips and her breasts and then gave her cunnilingus. By that time, Bahloul was stiff again. They had sex a second time; and then, when they had both climaxed, a third time.

=== Chapter 2: The Woman of Quality ===
According to Nefzawi, desired physical traits include a well-proportioned waist, full and firm breasts, wide hips, and refined hands and feet. Additional descriptions specify black hair, large dark eyes, an elegant nose, vermilion lips, fresh breath, a clean-scented vulva, and a plump physique.

Furthermore, she speaks and laughs rarely. Nefzawi adds that she never leaves the house and that she is not treacherous. If her husband shows his intention to have sex, she complies with it. She assists him in his affairs. She does not complain or cry much. When her husband is downhearted, she shares his troubles. In public, she hides her secret parts and does not let anyone see them. She always dresses well and avoids showing her husband what might be repugnant to him.

At this point, the author tells the story of Dorerame, a slave who enjoyed having sex with the most beautiful and well-born young women of his time, even if they belonged to other men. It is the longest story of The Perfumed Garden. We learn various things. For example, a woman says that a well-born lady could remain as long as six months without sex. We also learn that women can be very dangerous: he concludes this second chapter by saying that the moral of this tale is that "a man who falls in love with a woman imperils himself, and exposes himself to the greatest troubles."

=== Chapter 3: The Unattractive Man ===
Men who are misshapen, whose member is short, who do not have sex with vigour or in a manner that gives women enjoyment, who skip foreplay, who are quick to discharge their sperm and leave their partner right after the ejaculation, are men who are held in contempt by women.

Men who lie, who cannot be trusted, who conceal to their wives what they have been doing, except their adulterous affairs, are also men worthy of contempt.

=== Chapter 4: The Unattractive Woman ===
Ugly women are repulsive but also those who are overly raucous and have a loud laugh. A woman who is often seen joking and fooling around may be promiscuous. Also listed as disagreeable traits are revealing their husband's secrets, delighting in other's misfortune, pointing out other's shortcomings, busy-bodies, shrews, talkers, gossips, the lazy, harridans, the hysteric, the nag and the pilfering slag.

=== Chapter 5: Sexual Intercourse ===
It is recommended that a man should not eat or drink too much before having sex and that foreplay is necessary in order to excite the woman. When finished the man should not rush to leave and should do so on his right hand side.

=== Chapter 6: Sexual Technique ===
This chapter provides instructions on foreplay, specifying that it should include cunnilingus. The importance of the woman's enjoyment and climax are stressed, as are a number of steps to be taken to avoid injury or infection. Concerning sexual positions it is said that all are permissible (but Khawam's translation adds the words "except in her rear end," i.e., anal sex). Eleven positions are then listed, six with the woman on her back, one from behind, two with one or both on their sides, one over furniture and one hanging from a tree.

=== Chapter 7: The Harmful Effects of Intercourse ===
This chapter lists numerous ailments that can result from sex, including loss of sight, jaundice, sciatica, hernia, stones in the urinary tract and, that sex with old women is a deadly sure poison. It is recommended that sex is enjoyed in moderation as the worst diseases arise from sexual intercourse.

=== Chapter 8: Names for the Penis ===
More than 30 names are listed for the penis. There is then a long digression on dream interpretation.

=== Chapter 9: Names for the Vulva ===
Nearly 40 names are listed for the vulva. There is then a digression on dream interpretation. There follows the story of Ja'idi, a man who was laughed at by women but was still successful in bedding them.

=== Chapter 10: The Members of Animals ===
The names of animals' penises are listed, divided by hoofed beasts, cloven-hoofed beasts and clawed beasts. The behaviour of the lion is then discussed.

=== Chapter 11: Women's Tricks ===
This chapter opens by saying that women are more cunning than the devil. Four stories are presented, each with a woman who lies and tricks a man in some way, each ending with a warning to men about women. One story features an instance of zoophilia, with a woman and a donkey.

=== Chapter 12: Questions and Answers for Men and Women ===
The story of Mu'abbira, a wise woman, who provides insight into the workings of women's minds and desires, as well as again listing positive and negative traits for women.

=== Chapter 13: The Causes and Stimulation of Sexual Desire ===
A number of aphrodisiac recipes are presented.

=== Chapter 14: Remarks on Female Sterility and Methods of Treatment ===
This chapter speculates on likely causes of barrenness and proposes some cures. Possible causes include witches' spells and the actions of demons and jinn.

=== Chapter 15: The Causes of Male Sterility ===
This chapter deals with problems of male fertility. It is observed that failure to simultaneously orgasm can be a cause.

=== Chapter 16: Ways to Provoke Miscarriage ===
Recipes for abortion are listed.

=== Chapter 17: Treatment for Three Types of Erection Problem ===
This short chapter deals with failure to erect, failure to maintain an erection and premature ejaculation, with recipes for cures for each.

=== Chapter 18: How to Enlarge and Expand the Smaller Penis ===
This chapter opens by saying it will be of interest to women and men, because women do not like a small or limp penis.

=== Chapter 19: How to Remove Underarm and Vaginal Odour and Tighten the Vagina ===
Recipes are listed to address each.

=== Chapter 20: The Symptoms of Pregnancy and How to Determine the Sex of the Unborn Child ===
Listed are signs of first, pregnancy, then whether the baby will be male, then if it will be female (those for male are more positive than those for female).

=== Chapter 21: The Benefits of Eggs and Sexually Stimulating Beverages ===
This chapter opens with recommendations for various foods to enhance stamina. There is then the story of Abu'l Hayja, Abu'l Hayloukh and Maymoun, noting that it is a celebrated story of debauchery but far-fetched and fantastic. It features a woman thought to be a lesbian (because she had not been interested in one of the men) and ends with a set of sexual challenges – one man must deflower eighty virgins without ejaculating, one must have sex with a woman for fifty days, without going limp, another must stand in front of the women and maintain an erection for thirty days and nights. The fourth man must fetch them what they want. They complete the sexual challenges and take the palace as reward. The volume then concludes with a recipe for a sexually stimulating beverage, but notes that it should not be consumed in summer.

== Translations ==
=== 1886: Burton English translation ===
The Perfumed Garden first became widely known in the English-speaking world through a translation from the French in 1886 by Sir Richard Francis Burton. Burton mentions that he considers that the work can be compared to those of Aretin and Rabelais, and the French book Conjugal Love by Nicolas Venette but what Burton believes makes The Perfumed Garden unique in the genre is "the seriousness with which the most lascivious and obscene matters are presented." Burton points out that not all of the ideas in The Perfumed Garden are original: "For instance, all the record of Moçama and of Chedja is taken from the work of Mohammed ben Djerir el Taberi; the description of the different positions for coition, as well as the movements applicable to them, are borrowed from Indian works; finally, the book Birds and Flowers by Azeddine el Mocadecci (Izz al-Din al-Mosadeqi) seems to have been consulted with respect to the interpretation of dreams."

The French manuscript that Burton translated from was one printed by Isidore Liseux in 1886. This manuscript's last chapter — Chapter 21 — was incomplete, apparently because it contained material on homosexuality and pederasty which had been removed. When Burton died in late 1890, he was working on a new translation of the original manuscript, including this missing chapter. The revised translation, due to be retitled The Scented Garden, was never published as Burton's wife Isabel burned the manuscript soon after his death.

=== 1976: Khawam French translation ===
A new French translation by René R. Khawam was published in 1976.

=== 1999: Colville English translation ===
In 1999, Jim Colville published the first English Perfumed Garden translated directly from the Arabic original. Of the Burton translation, he says, "details were expanded, episodes introduced and whole sections incorporated from other, non-Arabic, sources. The text is dressed up in a florid prose alien to the style of the original and many of the notes are sheer speculation. The result is a consistently exaggerated and bizarre misrepresentation of the original".

Exaggeration on the part of Burton is vividly illustrated in Chapter 6, titled "Sexual Technique" in Colville's translation and "Concerning Everything That Is Favourable to the Act of Coition" in Burton's. Burton's translation is perhaps 25 pages long, lists 39 sex positions as well as 6 types of sexual movement, and gives creative names to many of these. Colville's translation is 2½ pages long, and lists 12 unnamed sex positions.

== Inspiration for musical works ==
In 1923 the English composer Kaikhosru Shapurji Sorabji wrote Le jardin parfumé: Poem for Piano Solo.

RAH Band released a single entitled “Perfumed Garden” in 1982.

Omnium Gatherum, a Finnish melodic death metal band, also wrote a song called "The Perfumed Garden", released on their "Spirits and August Light" album in 2003.

Ray Manzarek, inspired by this, recorded a track called "Perfumed Garden" for his solo album The Whole Thing Started With Rock & Roll, Now It's Out Of Control.

== See also ==
- A Promenade of the Hearts
- Banquet of Chestnuts
- Kama Sutra
- Sexuality in Islam
- The Jewel in The Lotus
