= Ahmad al-Tifashi =

Arabic poet from (1184–1253)

- أحمد بن يوسف القيسي التيفاشي
- Born: 1184; Tiffech, Algeria
- Died: 1253 (aged 68–69); Cairo, Egypt
- Occupations: Poet, Writer, Anthologist
- Writing career
- Language: Arabic
- Genres: Poetry, Anthology
- Notable work: A Promenade of the Hearts (نزهة الألباب)

Ahmad al-Tifashi whose full name is Shihab al-Din Abu al-Abbās Aḥmad ibn Yusuf al-Ḳaysi al-Tifachi (Arabic: أحمد بن يوسف القيسي التيفاشي), born in Tiffech, a village near Souk Ahras, Algeria (1184 – died 1253 in Cairo) was an Arabic poet, writer, and anthologist, best known for his work A Promenade of the Hearts (نزهة الألباب).

== Biography ==
Little is known of al-Tifashi's life. He appears to have lived mostly in Tunis, Cairo, and Damascus, although he may even have been nomadic. He was highly educated and cultured. He compiled A Promenade of the Hearts, a 12-chapter anthology of Arabic poetry and jokes about erotic and sexual practices, that featured both heterosexual and homoerotic entries with a bias towards the latter.

A French translation by René R. Khawam, based on an Arabic copy held in Paris, was published as Les Délices des cœurs par Ahmad al-Tifachi (1971 and 1981).

A scholarly translation by Edward A. Lacey of the homoerotic sections was published in English as The Delight of Hearts, or What You Will Not Find In Any Book (1988). This version won a Lambda Literary Award in 1989.

al-Tifashi also wrote several treatises concerned with sexual hygiene, one of which is preserved in a copy at The National Library of Medicine. He is, however, primarily known for his lapidary, which was the most famous and most comprehensive medieval Arabic treatise on the use of minerals. It covers 25 gems and minerals in great detail, giving medicine and magical uses for each as well as some Persian etymologies of the names. It is preserved in numerous manuscript copies and was used by many subsequent writes.

== Sources ==
For his life and writings, see:

- J. Ruska and O. Kahl, "Tifashi" in The Encyclopaedia of Islam, 2nd edition, ed. by H.A.R. Gibbs, B. Lewis, Ch. Pellat, C. Bosworth et al., 11 vols. (Leiden: E.J. Brill, 1960-2002), vol. 10, p. 476
- Manfred Ullmann, Die Medizin im Islam, Handbuch der Orientalistik, Abteilung I, Erg?nzungsband vi, Abschnitt 1 (Leiden: E.J. Brill, 1970), p. 196
- C. Brockelmann, Geschichte der arabischen Litteratur, Supplement, 3 vols. (Leiden: Brill, 1937-1942). vol. 1, p. 904.
