= Tylwyth Teg =

Mythological creature in Welsh folklore

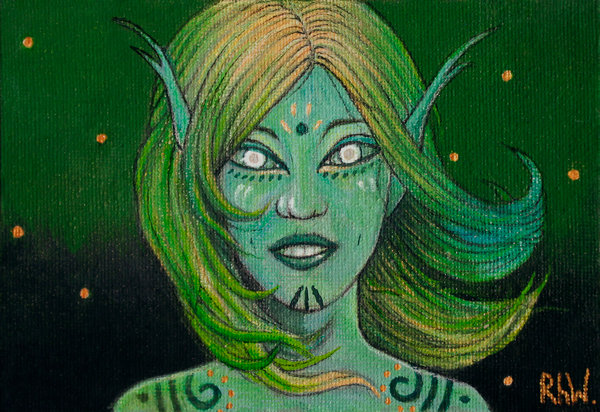
A contemporary imagining of Tylwyth Teg

Tylwyth Teg (Middle Welsh for "Fair Family"; Welsh pronunciation: [ˈtəlʊi̯θ teːg]) is the most usual term in Wales for the mythological creatures corresponding to the fairy folk of English and Continental folklore and the Irish Aos Sí. Other names for them include Bendith y Mamau ("Blessing of the Mothers"), Gwyllion and Ellyllon.

== Origins ==
The term tylwyth teg is first attested in a poem attributed to the 14th-century Dafydd ap Gwilym, in which the principal character gets perilously but comically lost while going to visit his girlfriend: "Hudol gwan yn ehedeg, / hir barthlwyth y Tylwyth Teg" ("(The) weak enchantment (now) flees, / (the) long burden of the Tylwyth Teg (departs) into the mist").

== Attributes ==
In later sources the tylwyth teg are described as fair-haired and covet golden-haired human children whom they kidnap, leaving changelings (or crimbilion, sing. crimbil) in their place. They dance and make fairy rings and they live underground or underwater. They bestow riches on those they favour but these gifts vanish if they are spoken of, and fairy maidens may become the wives of human men. These fairy wives are however still bound by traditional taboos. They must be careful to avoid touching iron or they will vanish back to their realm never to be seen by their husbands again.

As the Bendith y Mamau (the mothers blessing, a Southern Welsh name for fair folk), they ride horses in fairy rades (processions) and visit houses where bowls of milk are customarily put out for them. A changeling story tells of a woman whose three-year-old son was stolen by the fairies and who was given a threefold instruction by a "cunning man" (magician) on how to get him back. She removed the top from a raw egg and began stirring the contents, and as the changeling watched her do this certain comments he made established his otherworldly identity. She then went to a crossroads at midnight during the full moon and observed a fairy rade in order to confirm that her son was with them. Lastly she obtained a black hen and without plucking it she roasted it over a wood fire until every feather dropped off. The changeling then disappeared and her son was returned to her.

According to the folklorist Wirt Sikes the Tylwyth Teg may be divided into five general types: the Ellyllon (elves), the Coblynau (fairies of the mines), the Bwbachod (household fairies similar to brownies), the Gwragedd Annwn (female fairies of the lakes and streams) and the Gwyllion (mountain fairies more akin to hags). The ellyllon (singular ellyll) inhabit groves and valleys and are similar to English elves. Their food consists of toadstools and fairy butter (a type of fungus) and they wear digitalis bell flowers as gloves. They are ruled by Queen Mab and bring prosperity to those they favour.
