= Edward A. Lacey =

Canadian poet and translator (1937-1995)

- Born: July 12, 1937; Lindsay, Ontario
- Died: 1995 (aged 57–58); Toronto, Ontario
- Occupations: poet, translator
- Writing career
- Period: 1960s-1990s
- Notable works: The Forms of Life, Path of Snow: Poems 1951-73, Later, Third World: Travel Poems, The Delight of Hearts, or What You Will Not Find in Any Book

Edward A. Lacey (1937-1995) was a Canadian poet and translator, who was credited with publishing the first openly gay-identified collection of poetry in the history of Canadian literature.

Born in Lindsay, Ontario, Lacey studied French and German at the University of Toronto before moving to Texas to pursue an M.A. in linguistics at the University of Texas at Austin. While there, he was the roommate of Randy Wicker, who ran for president of the student union but was disqualified when the university president learned that Wicker and Lacey were gay. Shortly before his graduation, he was arrested for transporting marijuana across the U.S.-Mexican border, and received his degree in absentia.

Throughout his career he worked as a translator and taught literature and English as a second language in Mexico, Trinidad, Brazil, Greece and Thailand, including a stint as a private tutor to former Brazilian president Juscelino Kubitschek. He also held academic positions at the University of Alberta and the University of the West Indies. He published The Forms of Loss, the first gay-identified book of poetry published in Canada, in 1965. The book was financed by Dennis Lee and Margaret Atwood.

His later volumes of poetry included Path of Snow: Poems 1951-73 (1974), Later (1978) and Third World: Travel Poems (1994). A posthumous collection, The Collected Poems and Translations of Edward A. Lacey (2000), was also published. His poetry also appears in the anthologies Gay Roots: Twenty Years of Gay Sunshine, An Anthology of Gay History: Sex, Politics & Culture (1991) and Seminal: The Anthology of Canada's Gay Male Poets (2007).

Throughout his career, Lacey also wrote many letters to friends, including Wicker, Winston Leyland, Henry Beissel, John Robert Colombo and Ian Young; his letters to Beissel were edited by David Helwig for publication in A Magic Prison: Letters from Edward Lacey (1995). He published translations into English from French, Spanish, and Portuguese, including The Delight of Hearts, or What You Will Not Find in Any Book, a 1988 publication of the poetry of Ahmad al-Tifashi. The Delight of Hearts won a Lambda Literary Award in 1989.

While working in Thailand, Lacey suffered life-threatening injuries in 1991 when he passed out drunk in a street in Bangkok and was run over by a vehicle. He was transported back to Canada, where he remained largely bedridden in a rooming house in Toronto until his death in 1995.

Author Fraser Sutherland published a biography of Lacey, Lost Passport: The Life and Words of Edward Lacey, in 2011.
