= Gwragedd Annwn =

Mythical Welsh fairy folk

Creature information
- Other name(s): Lake Maidens; Wives of the Lower World; Dames of Elfin Land
- Grouping: Faeries
- Similar entities: Tylwyth Teg
- Folklore: Myth

Origin
- Country: Wales
- Region: Neath Port Talbot

Gwragedd Annwn, (singular Welsh: gwraig Annwn) alternatively known as Dames of the Lower Region, Dames of Elfin Land, or Wives of the Lower World, are beautiful female fairies who live beneath lakes and rivers found in Welsh folklore. They are counted among the Tylwyth Teg or Welsh fairy folk. The mythological narrative of Gwragedd Annwn is intertwined with the origin of the Welsh black cattle. Occasionally, the fairies were said to ascend into the upper world, and be visible to ordinary people.

== Origin ==
Gwragedd Annwn were purportedly created by St. Patrick, when he journeyed from Ireland to Wales, to meet with St. David of Wales. A crowd of Welsh folk spotted the two meeting, and began to verbally abuse St. Patrick, angry at him for having left Cambria. St. Patrick, who was Welsh and therefore could understand their insults, punished the offending Welsh folk by transforming them into fish. However, since some of the people there were women, they were instead transformed into Lake Fairies.

== Characteristics ==
While there is no shortage of mythological water-dwelling female beings in European culture, the Gwragedd Annwn are distinct in that they do not have the characteristics of any sea creature. Compare other beings of myth such as Selkies (Scottish "sea-maidens") or Merrows (Irish mermaids). According to folklore, these supernatural maidens were said to live in or beneath certain lakes, notably the "Bearded Lake" Llyn Barfog in Gwynedd and Crumlyn Lake, located near Briton Ferry, Neath Port Talbot, Wales. The Gwragedd Annwn can only be found near lakes and rivers, and are not said to live in the ocean, another factor which sets them apart from other aquatic fairy or mermaid-like creatures. The Gwragedd Annwn dressed in green. They appear to be the only type of fairy capable of crossing from the lower world, led by the fairy king Gwyn ap Nudd, to the upper world, where regular human beings dwell. They are most likely to be found near lakes that in isolated, or in mountainous areas.

== The Elfin Cow of Llyn Barfog ==
In Welsh myth, the Gwragedd Annwn were said to herd cattle. These cattle were special, and had a coat of pure white. They were known as Gwartheg y Llyn, or the kine of the lake. At some point, myth holds that a farmer caught one of these pure white cows, and it provided him with butter, milk, and cheese of the highest quality. So excellent was the milk provided by this cow, that the farmer became rich. In some variations of the legends, the milk from this mystical cow could heal injuries, make a person more intelligent, and put anyone in a cheerful mood. Having other cattle descended from this cow, the farmer decided to fatten the cow up for slaughter. When the butcher tried to bludgeon the cow, the instrument passed through her head and did nothing. Suddenly, angered that the farmer had attempted to slaughter the cow, a woman in green, one of the Gwragedd Annwn, called the cow and all her offspring away, except for one, which had turned jet black. This is how the Welsh black cattle came to be.

== Bibliography ==
- Davies, Jonathan Ceredig (1911). Folklore of West and Mid-Wales. Aberystwyth.
- Rhys, John (1901). Celtic Folklore: Welsh and Manx. Vol. 1. Clarendon Press.
- Sikes, Wirt (1880). British Goblins: Welsh Folklore, Fairy Mythology, Legends and Traditions. Sampson Low, Marston, Searle & Rivington.
