= Gwyllion =

Aspect of Welsh folklore

Gwyllion or gwyllon is a Welsh word with a wide range of possible meanings including "ghosts, spirits" and "night-wanderers (human or supernatural) up to no good, outlaws of the wild." Gwyllion is only one of a number of words with these or similar meanings in Welsh. It is a plural form of the Welsh word gwyll(t), meaning "wild".

== Folklore ==
According to folklorist Wirt Sikes the gwyllion are female fairies of frightful aspect who haunt lonely roads in the Welsh mountains and lead travellers astray. They are gloomy spirits more akin to hags or witches, as distinct from the Welsh ellyllon (elves) that are more benevolent. Those who encountered them either by night or on a misty day would be sure to lose their way even if they were perfectly familiar with the road. One gwyll in particular was known as the Old Woman of the Mountain who haunted Llanhyddel Mountain in Monmouthshire, and the popular tradition in that district was that she was the ghost of a woman who had been regarded in life as a witch. She is known to utter strange cries and shouts throughout her mountain in order to frighten wayfarers.

The Old Woman has also been encountered on Black Mountain in Breconshire. One man reported meeting her there and at the same time found that he had lost his way. Thinking she was human he called out for her to stay but receiving no answer he thought she was deaf. He tried to overtake her but she led him further astray, always out of reach, until he found himself in a marsh. When she uttered a cackling laugh he suspected she might be a gwyll so he drew his knife, whereupon the Old Woman vanished. His suspicions were confirmed for it was well known that Welsh ghosts and fairies were afraid of knives and could be banished by them.

This exorcism by knife, according to Sikes, is a particularly Welsh tradition. The gwyllion often came into the houses of the people at the parish of Aberystruth, especially in stormy weather. She was always made welcome, not out of any sense of friendship but out of fear of what she might do to them if she were offended. She was provided with clean water and care was taken that no knife or any other cutting tool should be in the corner near the fire where the fairies liked to sit. While it was desirable to exorcise them when in the open air it was not prudent to display an inhospitable attitude towards any member of the fairy realm.

Another traveller encountered the gwyllion at night on Bedwellty Mountain. There were several such spirits dancing fantastically around him. He also heard the sounds of a bugle-horn and what seemed like invisible hunters riding by. Although he was afraid he drew his knife and the fairies vanished. Sikes speculates that if these ideas are traced back to their source then they may have some connection with the sword Excalibur and the role it plays in the primeval world. The folklorist Katharine Briggs suggested that it may have to do with the traditional fairy vulnerability to cold iron.

== In popular culture ==
- The Gwyllion is featured as the main antagonist in the 2013 CGI animated film Barbie: Mariposa and the Fairy Princess. She appears as a vengeful old woman with light grey hair who attacked the crystal fairies.
- In The Lord of the Rings Online video game the culture of Dunland, sparsely described by J. R. R. Tolkien, is heavily based on the Welsh mythology. Gwyllion, also called "the Old Woman of the Mountain", appears in Dunland as a secondary antagonist who is in alliance with Saruman the White.
- In the Good Kid song 'Witches', the Gwyllion are mentioned in the lyric; "Now just take a look at this through Gwyllion eyes".
- In the Choose Your Own Adventure book, The Enchanted Kingdom, one storyline involves the protagonist traveling to a mountain range and defeating a group of "ghouls" by brandishing a knife with a plastic handle. The ghouls, enemies of the fairies, are portrayed similarly to Gwyllion and seem to be based on them.

== See also ==
- Gwylliaid Cochion Mawddwy, the so-called "Red Bandits of Mawddwy"
- Tylwyth Teg, the Welsh fairy folk
- Will-o'-the-wisp, another being that leads travellers astray
