= A Promenade of the Hearts =

13th-century anthology of Arabic erotic literature

A Promenade of the Hearts (Arabic: نزهة الألباب, romanized: nuzhat al-ʾalbāb) is a collection of stories, anecdotes, and poems from the Arab Middle Ages, including some poems on homosexual and lesbian themes. Ahmad al-Tifashi, the compiler (1184–1253), was born in Tiffech (now in Algeria), and studied in Tunisia, Egypt and Damascus. His interests included law, natural science, astrology, poetry and the social sciences.

A French translation by René R. Khawam, titled Les Délices des cœurs par Ahmad al-Tifachi, was published in 1971 and 1981, and an English translation by Edward A. Lacey, titled The Delight of Hearts, or What You Will Not Find in Any Book, was published in 1988 by Gay Sunshine Press. The English version won a Lambda Literary Award at the 1st Lambda Literary Awards in 1989.

== See also ==
- Encyclopedia of Pleasure
