= Sluagh =

Spirits of the unforgiven dead in Scottish and Irish Gaelic folklore

The Sluagh (Irish: [ˈsˠl̪ˠuə], Scottish Gaelic: [ˈs̪l̪ˠuəɣ]; Old Irish: slúag; English: 'host, army, crowd'), or Sluagh na marbh ('host of the dead'), were the hosts of the unforgiven dead in Irish and Scottish folklore. In the words of British folklorist Lewis Spence, "In the Western Isles of Scotland the Sluagh, or fairy host, was regarded as composed of the souls of the dead flying through the air, and the feast of the dead at Hallowe'en was likewise the festival of the fairies." Usually taking a crescent form, similar to a flight of birds, they were said to be able to approach and pick up a person from any direction and then transport them far away through the air, from one island to another. Although they would sometimes rescue humans from dangerous rock clefts, they were generally portrayed as dangerous to mortals.

== Etymology ==
The Scottish Gaelic name Sluagh stems from the Old Irish slúag (≈ slóg), meaning 'host, army; crowd, assembly'. Variant forms include slógh and sluag. It derives from the Proto-Celtic root *slougo- (cf. Gaul. catu-slougi 'troops of combat', Middle Welsh llu 'troop', Old Bret. -lu 'army'), whose original meaning may have been 'those serving the chief', by comparison with Balto-Slavic words that probably emerged from early linguistic contacts with Celtic speakers in Central-Eastern Europe: e.g. Lithuanian slaugà ('service, servitude'), or Old Church Slavonic sluga ('servant').

== In popular culture ==
In the Legacy of Kain video game series, Sluagh are among the enemies that Raziel encounters in the Spectral Realm. They are scavenging, animalistic creatures that prey on souls and usually prefer to flee from Raziel unless cornered or in a group.

Within the VR motion ride Battle for Eire at Busch Gardens Williamsburg, the Sluagh are the minions of the evil villain Balor in the ride's story.

In the table top roleplaying game Household by Two Little Mice, the Sluagh are littlings that form the nation of the Horde, and who live in the Basement

== See also ==
- Fairy
- Classifications of fairies
- Restless ghost
- Wild Hunt
- Santa Compaña
