= Erotic literature =

Literary genre

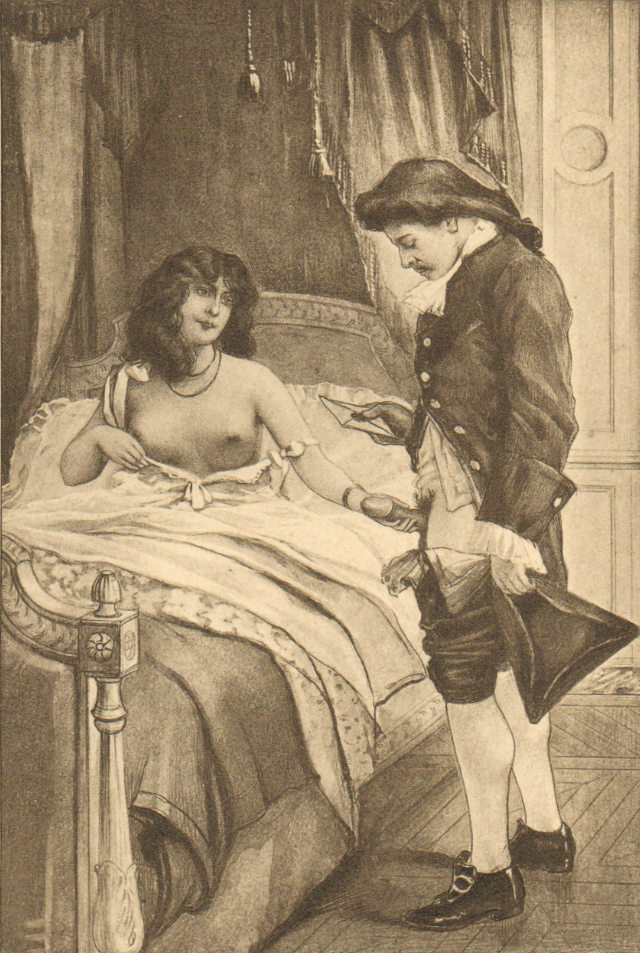
Illustration by Édouard-Henri Avril from the erotic novel Fanny Hill (1748)

The term erotic literature refers to fictional or factual stories and accounts of eros (passionate, romantic, or sexual relationships) intended to sexually arouse readers. This may overlap with, yet also contrast with, erotica, which focuses more specifically on sexual feelings. Other common elements are satire and social criticism. Much erotic literature features erotic art to illustrate the text.

Although erotic literature often met disapproval, its circulation was not a major issue before the invention of printing, as the cost of producing individual manuscripts limited distribution to a small group of wealthy, literate readers. The invention of printing in the 15th century brought both a larger market and increasing restrictions, including censorship and legal restraints on publication on the grounds of obscenity. As a result, much of this material was produced clandestinely.

== History ==
=== Early periods ===
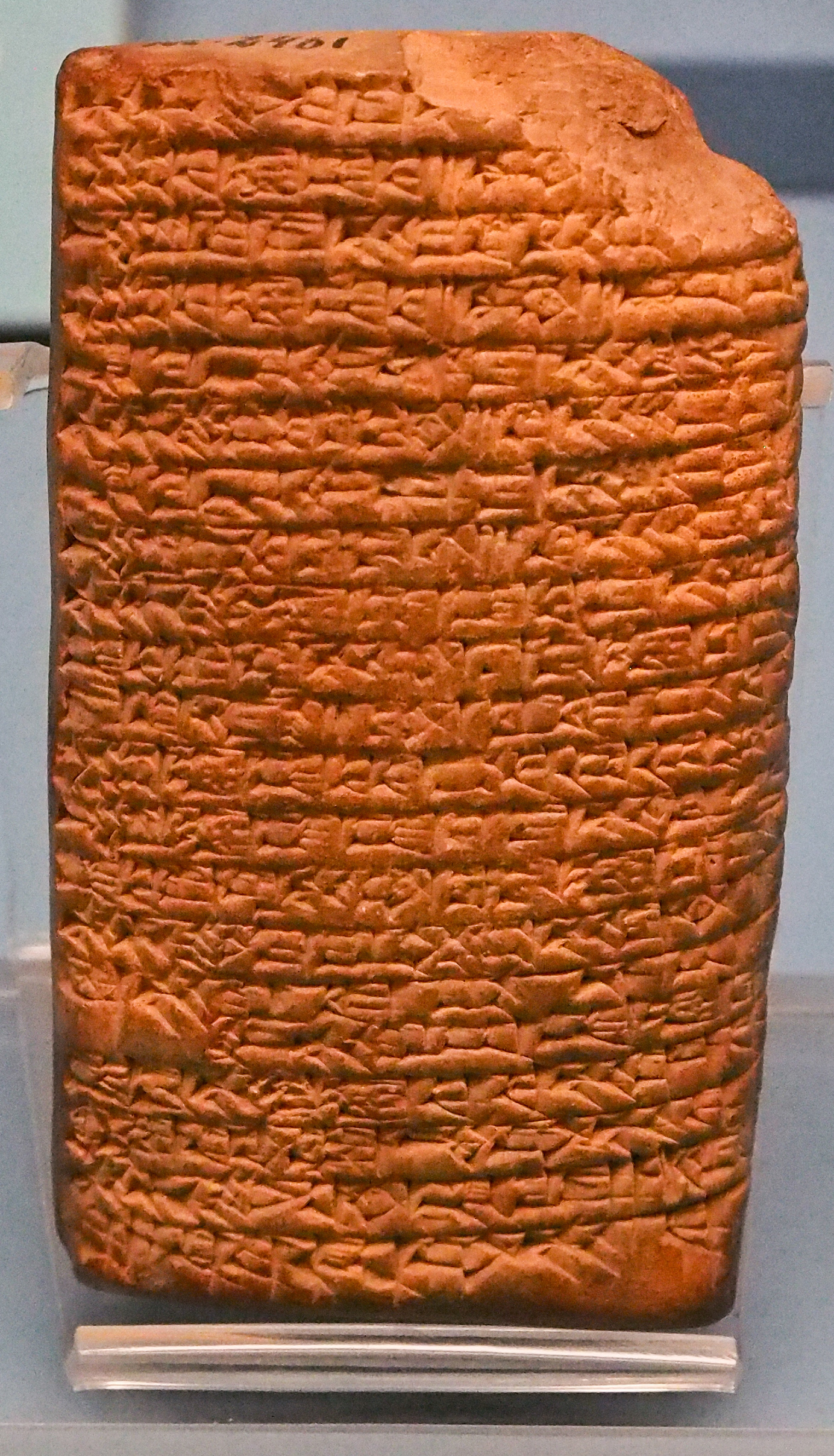
Clay tablet with a Sumerian love poem from the 3rd millennium BCE

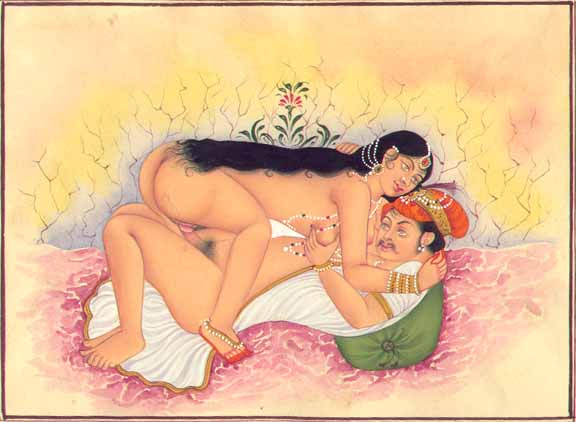
Illustration based on Kama Sutra, ancient Hindu text about erotic love

The oldest known love poem is Istanbul 2461, from circa 2000 BCE, an erotic monologue written by a female speaker directed to king Shu-Sin.

In ancient Sumer, a whole cycle of poems revolved around the sexual relationship between the goddess Inanna and her consort Dumuzid the Shepherd.

In the Hebrew Bible, the Song of Songs, found in the last section of the Tanakh, celebrates sexual love, giving "the voices of two lovers, praising each other, yearning for each other, proffering invitations to enjoy".

Many erotic poems have survived from ancient Greece and Rome. The Greek poets Straton of Sardis and Sappho of Lesbos both wrote erotic lyric poems. The poet Archilochus wrote numerous satirical poems filled with obscene and erotic imagery. Erotic poems continued to be written in Hellenistic and Roman times by writers like Automedon (The Professional and Demetrius the Fortunate), Philodemus (Charito) and Marcus Argentarius. Roman erotic poets included Catullus, Propertius, Tibullus, Ovid, Martial and Juvenal, and the anonymous Priapeia. Some later Latin authors such as Joannes Secundus also wrote erotic verse.

Haft Peykar (Persian: هفت پیکر) also known as Bahramnameh (بهرام‌نامه, The Book of Bahram) is a romantic epic by the Persian poet Nizami Ganjavi written in 1197. This poem is a part of Nizami's Khamsa. The original title Haft Peykar can be translated literally as "seven portraits" with the figurative meaning of "seven beauties." The poem has been described as a masterpiece of erotic literature, but also as a profoundly moralistic work.

During the Renaissance period, many poems were not written for publication; instead, they were merely circulated in manuscript form among a relatively limited readership. This was the original method of circulation for the sonnets of William Shakespeare, who also wrote the erotic poems Venus and Adonis and The Rape of Lucrece. Erotic writing also has long traditions outside Europe. In India, the 12th-century Sanskrit poem Gita Govinda by Jayadeva celebrates the love of Krishna and Radha in explicitly sensual terms. In China, the lane-Ming novel Jin Ping Mei, which circulated in manuscript before being circulated in print in the early 17th century, is noted for its explicit sexual content within a detailed portrait of household life.

The Perfumed Garden of Sensual Delight (Arabic: الروض العاطر في نزهة الخاطر) is a fifteenth-century Arabic sex manual and work of erotic literature by Muhammad ibn Muhammad al-Nefzawi, also known simply as "Nefzawi". The book presents opinions on what qualities men and women should have to be attractive and gives advice on sexual technique, warnings about sexual health, and recipes to remedy sexual maladies. It gives lists of names for the penis and vulva, and has a section on the interpretation of dreams. Interspersed with these there are a number of stories which are intended to give context and amusement.

=== 17th century ===
In the 17th century, John Wilmot, Earl of Rochester (1647–80) was notorious for obscene verses, many of which were published posthumously in compendiums of poetry by him and other "Restoration rakes" such as Sir Charles Sedley, Charles Sackville, 6th Earl of Dorset, and George Etherege. Though many of the poems attributed to Rochester were actually by other authors, his reputation as a libertine was such that his name was used as a selling point by publishers of collections of erotic verse for centuries after. One poem definitely by him was "A Ramble in St. James's Park", in which the protagonist's quest for healthy exercise in the park uncovers instead "Bugg'ries, Rapes and Incest" on ground polluted by debauchery from the time when "Ancient Pict began to Whore". This poem was being censored from collections of Rochester's poetry as late as 1953, though, in line with the subsequent general change in attitudes to sexuality, it was dramatised as a scene in the film The Libertine about his life, based on an existing play.

English collections of erotic verse by various hands include the Drollery collections of the 17th century; Pills to Purge Melancholy (1698–1720); the Roxburghe Ballads; Bishop Percy's Folio; The Musical Miscellany; National Ballad and Song: Merry Songs and Ballads Prior to the Year AD 1800 (1895–97) edited by J. S. Farmer; the three volume Poetica Erotica (1921) and its more obscene supplement the Immortalia (1927) both edited by T. R. Smith. French collections include Les Muses gaillardes (1606) Le Cabinet satyrique (1618) and La Parnasse des poetes satyriques (1622).

In Japan, Ihara Saikaku's The Life of an Amorous Woman (1686) was among the best known works of the popular Ukiyo-zōshi fiction of the Edo period that dealt with sexual life.

=== 18th century ===
In the 18th century, a famous collection of four erotic poems, was published in England in 1763, called An Essay on Woman. This included the title piece, an obscene parody of Alexander Pope's "An Essay on Man"; "Veni Creator: or, The Maid's Prayer", which is original; the "Universal Prayer", an obscene parody of Pope's poem of the same name, and "The Dying Lover to his Prick", which parodies "A Dying Christian to his Soul" by Pope. These poems have been attributed to John Wilkes and/or Thomas Potter and receive the distinction of being the only works of erotic literature ever read out loud and in their entirety in the House of Lords—before being declared obscene and blasphemous by that body and the supposed author, Wilkes, declared an outlaw.

Robert Burns worked to collect and preserve Scottish folk songs, sometimes revising, expanding, and adapting them. One of the better known of these collections is The Merry Muses of Caledonia (the title is not by Burns), a collection of bawdy lyrics that were popular in the music halls of Scotland as late as the 20th century.

=== 19th century ===
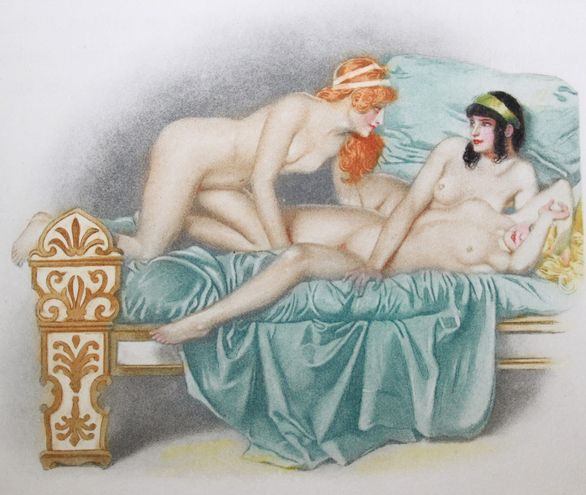
Illustration by Maurice Ray for Pierre Louÿs's Aphrodite: mœurs antiques (1896)

One of the 19th century's foremost poets—Algernon Charles Swinburne—devoted much of his considerable talent to erotic verse, producing, inter alia, twelve eclogues on flagellation titled The Flogging Block "by Rufus Rodworthy, annotated by Barebum Birchingly"; more was published anonymously in The Whippingham Papers (c. 1888). Another notorious anonymous 19th-century poem on the same subject is The Rodiad, ascribed (seemingly falsely and in jest) to George Colman the Younger. John Camden Hotten even wrote a pornographic comic opera, Lady Bumtickler's Revels, on the theme of flagellation in 1872.

Pierre Louÿs helped found a literary review, La Conque in 1891, where he proceeded to publish Astarte—an early collection of erotic verse already marked by his distinctive elegance and refinement of style. He followed up in 1894 with another erotic collection in 143 prose poems—Songs of Bilitis (Les Chansons de Bilitis), this time with strong lesbian themes.

=== 20th century ===
Although D. H. Lawrence could be regarded as a writer of love poems, he usually dealt in the less romantic aspects of love such as sexual frustration or the sex act itself. Ezra Pound, in his Literary Essays, complained of Lawrence's interest in his own "disagreeable sensations" but praised him for his "low-life narrative". This is a reference to Lawrence's dialect poems akin to the Scots poems of Robert Burns, in which he reproduced the language and concerns of the people of Nottinghamshire from his youth. He called one collection of poems Pansies partly for the simple ephemeral nature of the verse but also a pun on the French word panser, to dress or bandage a wound. "The Noble Englishman" and "Don't Look at Me" were removed from the official edition of Pansies on the grounds of obscenity; Lawrence felt wounded by this.

From the age of 17, Gavin Ewart acquired a reputation for wit and accomplishment through such works as "Phallus in Wonderland" and "Poems and Songs", which appeared in 1939 and was his first collection. The intelligence and casually flamboyant virtuosity with which he framed his often humorous commentaries on human behaviour made his work invariably entertaining and interesting. The irreverent eroticism for which his poetry is noted resulted in W H Smith's banning of his "The Pleasures of the Flesh" (1966) from their shops.

Canadian poet John Glassco wrote Squire Hardman (1967), a long poem in heroic couplets, purporting to be a reprint of an 18th-century poem by George Colman the Younger, on the theme of flagellation.

The Italian writer Una Chi has been noted for coldly analytical prose and the crudeness of the stories.

In prose, the period also produced works that became the test cases for censorship, including Henry Miller's Tropic of Cancer (1934) and D. H. Lawrence's Lady Chatterley's Lover (1928), as well as erotic fiction such as Anne Desclos' Histoire d'O (1954) and Anaïs Nin's short story collection Delta of Venus, published in 1977.

== Other accounts ==
=== Writings of prostitutes ===
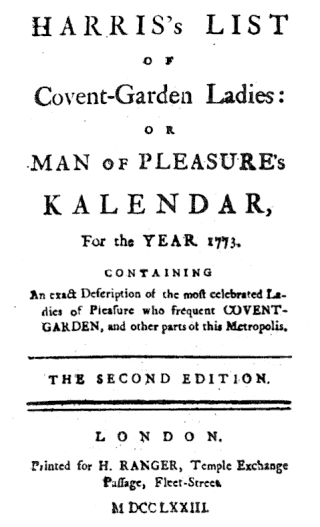
Harris's List of Covent Garden Ladies

Prostitution was the focus of much of the earliest erotic works. The term pornography is derived from the Greek pornographos meaning "writer about prostitutes", originally denoting descriptions of the lives and manners of prostitutes and their customers in Ancient Greece. According to Athenaeus in The Deipnosophists these constituted a considerable genre, with many lubricious treatises, stories and dramas on the subject. A surviving example of this genre is Lucian of Samosata's Dialogues of the Courtesans.

Accounts of prostitution have continued as a major part of the genre of erotic literature. In the 18th century, directories of prostitutes and their services, such as Harris's List of Covent Garden Ladies (1757–1795), provided both entertainment and instruction.

In the 19th century, the sensational journalism of W. T. Stead's The Maiden Tribute of Modern Babylon (1885) about the procuring of underage girls into the brothels of Victorian London provided a stimulus for the erotic imagination. Stead's account was widely translated and the revelation of "padded rooms for the purpose of stifling the cries of the tortured victims of lust and brutality" and the symbolic figure of "The Minotaur of London" confirmed European observers' worst imaginings about "Le Sadisme anglais" and inspired erotic writers to write of similar scenes set in London or involving sadistic English gentlemen. Such writers include D'Annunzio in Il Piacere, Paul-Jean Toulet in Monsieur de Paur (1898), Octave Mirbeau in Jardin des Supplices (1899) and Jean Lorrain in Monsieur de Phocas (1901).

Well-known recent works in this genre are The Happy Hooker: My Own Story (1971) by the Dutch madame Xaviera Hollander and The Intimate Adventures of a London Call Girl (2005) by Belle de Jour.

=== Writings of students ===
In the 21st century, a new literary genre of student published journals at American universities was started. The following is a partial list of publications:

- The Moderator – Bard College
- Virgin Mawrtyr – Bryn Mawr College
- H-Bomb – Harvard University
- Quake – University of Pennsylvania
- Squirm – Vassar College
- Vita Excolatur – University of Chicago
- Bang and Untouchables – Swarthmore College
- Boink – Boston University

=== Sex manual ===
Sex manuals are among the oldest forms of erotic literature. Three brief fragments of a sex manual written in the fourth century BC that is attributed to Philaenis of Samos have survived. Modern scholars generally regard it as a work of parody probably written by a man, and this was most likely Athenian sophist Polycrates. Other examples of the genre from the classical world include the lost works of Elephantis and Ovid's Ars Amatoria. The Indian Kama Sutra is one of the world's best-known works of this type. The Ananga Ranga, a 12th-century collection of Indian erotic works, is a lesser known one. The Perfumed Garden for the Soul's Recreation, a 16th-century Arabic work by Sheikh Nefzaoui, is also well-known and is often reprinted and translated. There is anecdotal evidence that, as late as the mid-20th century, sex therapists and other physicians prescribed erotic literature as treatment for erectile dysfunction.

The ancient Chinese versions of the sex manual include the texts that contain the Taoist sexual practices. These include books that show illustrations of the ideal sexual behavior because sex in this religion is not considered taboo but a manifestation of the concept of the yin and yang, wherein the male and female engage in an act of "joining of energy" or "joining of essences". The belief is that proper sexual practice is key to achieving good health. The manuals included the Ishinpo text, which is a medical document that also included sections devoted to sexual hygiene and sexual manuals of the Tang and Han dynasties.

Not all sex manuals were produced to arouse or inform readers about sexual acts. Some were created as a form of satire or social criticism, as in the case of a mock-sex manual produced in the early sixteenth century by Pietro Aretino. It was in response to the clerical censorship of the nude engravings of the Roman artists Marcantonio Raimondi. This was released in cheap wood, with a corresponding sonnet serving as the voice of the characters.

=== Erotic memoir ===
Erotic memoirs are a subgenre of erotic literature that blend personal experiences with sensual storytelling. Examples include the memoirs of Giacomo Casanova and the anonymous Victorian My Secret Life (memoir).

=== Erotic fiction ===
Erotic fiction is a genre of fiction that portrays sex or sexual themes, generally in a more literary way than the fiction seen in pornographic magazines. It sometimes includes elements of satire or social criticism. These types of fiction have frequently been banned by the government or religious authorities.

== Legal status ==
=== Early legislation ===
==== To 1857 ====
Erotic or pornographic works have often been prosecuted, censored and destroyed by the authorities on grounds of obscenity. In medieval England, erotic or pornographic publications were the concern of the ecclesiastical courts. After the Reformation the jurisdiction of these courts declined in favour of the Crown, which licensed every printed book. Prosecutions of books for their erotic content alone were rare and works which attacked the church or state gave much more concern to the authorities than erotica or 'obscene libel' as it was then known. For instance the Licensing Act 1662 was aimed generally at "heretical, seditious, schismatical or offensive books of pamphlets" rather than just erotica per se. Even this Licensing Act was allowed to lapse in 1695 and no attempt made to renew it.

The first conviction for obscenity in England occurred in 1727, when Edmund Curll was fined for the publication of Venus in the Cloister or The Nun in her Smock under the common law offence of disturbing the King's peace. This set a legal precedent for other convictions. The publication of other books by Curll, however, considered seditious and blasphemous, such as The Memoirs of John Ker, apparently most offended the authorities. Prosecutions of erotica later in the 18th century were rare and were most often taken because of the admixture of seditious and blasphemous material with the porn.

==== 1857–1959 ====
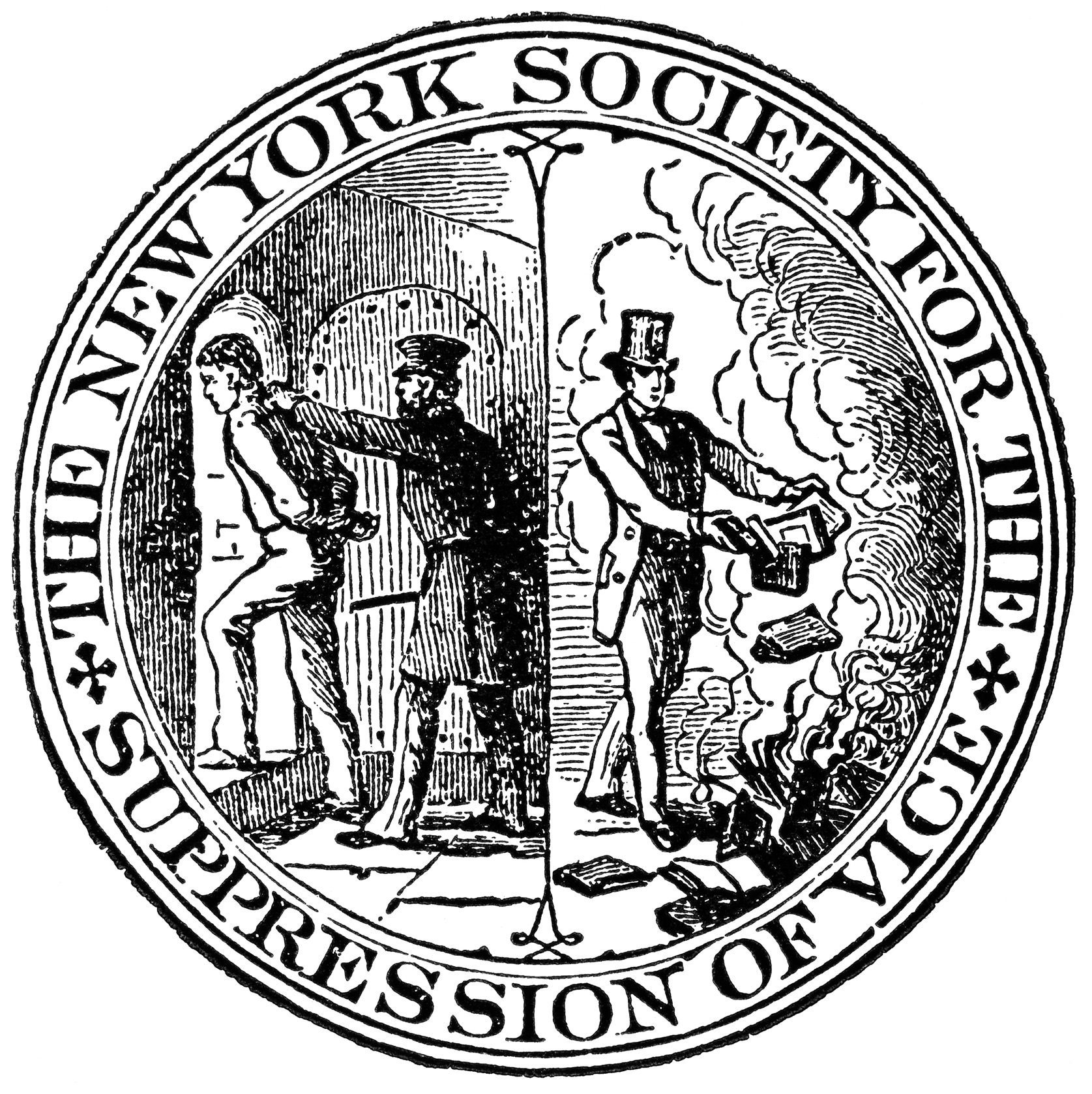
Erotic literature going up in smoke and its distributors being put in jail, courtesy of Anthony Comstock's New York Society for the Suppression of Vice

It was the Obscene Publications Act 1857 which made the sale of obscene material a statutory offense, giving the courts power to seize and destroy offending material. The origins of the act itself were in a trial for the sale of pornography presided over by the Lord Chief Justice, Lord Campbell, at the same time as a debate in the House of Lords over a bill aiming to restrict the sale of poisons. Campbell was taken by the analogy between the two situations, famously referring to the London pornography trade as "a sale of poison more deadly than prussic acid, strychnine or arsenic", and proposed a bill to restrict the sale of pornography; giving statutory powers of destruction would allow for a much more effective degree of prosecution. The bill was controversial at the time, receiving strong opposition from both Houses of Parliament. It was passed on the assurance by the Lord Chief Justice that it was "intended to apply exclusively to works written for the single purpose of corrupting the morals of youth and of a nature calculated to shock the common feelings of decency in any well-regulated mind." The House of Commons successfully amended it so as not to apply to Scotland, on the grounds that Scottish common law was sufficiently stringent.

The Act provided for the seizure and destruction of any material deemed to be obscene, and held for sale or distribution, following information being laid before a "court of summary jurisdiction" (magistrates' court). The Act required that following evidence of a common-law offence being committed – for example, on the report of a plain-clothes policeman who had successfully purchased the material – the court could issue a warrant for the premises to be searched and the material seized. The proprietor then would be called upon to attend court and give reason why the material should not be destroyed. Critically, the Act did not define "obscene", leaving this to the will of the courts.

While the Act itself did not change, the scope of the work affected by it did. In 1868 Sir Alexander Cockburn, Campbell's successor as Lord Chief Justice, held in an appeal that the test of obscenity was "whether the tendency of the matter charged as obscenity is to deprave and corrupt those whose minds are open to such immoral influences and into whose hands a publication of this sort may fall." This was clearly a major change from Campbell's opinion only ten years before – the test now being the effect on someone open to corruption who obtained a copy, not whether the material was intended to corrupt or offend.

Cockburn's declaration remained in force for several decades, and most of the high profile seizures under the Act relied on this interpretation. Known as the Hicklin test no cognisance was taken of the literary merit of a book or on the extent of the offending text within the book in question. The widened scope of the original legislation led to the subsequent notorious targeting of now acknowledged classics of world literature by such authors as Zola, James Joyce and D.H. Lawrence plus medical textbooks by such as Havelock Ellis rather than the blatant erotica which was the original target of this law.

In contrast to England, where actions against obscene literature were the preserve of the magistrates, such actions were the responsibility of the Postal Inspection Service in America. They were embodied in the federal and state Comstock laws and named after the postal officer and anti-obscenity crusader Anthony Comstock, who proved himself officious in the work of suppression both in his official capacity and through his New York Society for the Suppression of Vice. The first such law was the Comstock Act, (ch. 258 17 Stat. 598 enacted March 3, 1873) which made it illegal to send any "obscene, lewd, and/or lascivious" materials through the mail. Twenty-four states passed similar prohibitions on materials distributed within the states.

=== Modern legislation ===
This question of whether a book had literary merit eventually prompted a change in the law in both America and the UK. In the United Kingdom the Obscene Publications Act 1959 provided for the protection of "literature" but conversely increased the penalties against pure "pornography." The law defined obscenity and separated it from serious works of art.

The new definition read:

[A]n article shall be deemed to be obscene if its effect or (where the article comprises two or more distinct items) the effect of any one of its items is, if taken as a whole, such as to tend to deprave and corrupt persons who are likely, having regard to all relevant circumstances, to read, see or hear the matter contained or embodied in it.

After this piece of legislation questions of the literary merit of the work in question were allowed to be put before the judge and jury as in the Lady Chatterley trial. The publishers of the latter book were found not guilty by the court on the grounds of the literary merit of the book. In later prosecutions of literary erotica under the provisions of the act, however, even purely pornographic works with no apparent literary merit escaped destruction by the authorities. Purely textual pornographic texts, with no hint of libel, ceased to be brought to trial following the collapse of the Inside Linda Lovelace trial in 1976. However, in October 2008, a man was unsuccessfully prosecuted under the Obscene Publications Act (the R v Walker trial) for posting fictional written material to the Internet allegedly describing the kidnap, rape and murder of the pop group Girls Aloud.

The First Amendment to the United States Constitution gives protection to written fiction, although the legal presumption that it does not protect obscene literature has never been overcome. Instead, pornography has successfully been defined legally as non-obscene, or "obscene" been shown to be so vague a term as to be unenforceable. In 1998 Brian Dalton was charged with creation and possession of child pornography under an Ohio obscenity law. The stories were works of fiction concerning sexually abusing children which he wrote and kept, unpublished, in his private journal. He accepted a plea bargain, pleaded guilty and was convicted. Five years later, the conviction was vacated.

Importing books and texts across national borders can sometimes be subject to more stringent laws than in the nations concerned. Customs officers are often permitted to seize even merely 'indecent' works that would be perfectly legal to sell and possess once one is inside the nations concerned. Canada has been implicated in such border seizures.

Although the Obscene Publications Act of 1857, as well as 1959 legislation, outlawed the publication, retail and trafficking of certain types of writings and images regarded as pornographic, and would order the destruction of shop and warehouse stock meant for sale, the private possession of and viewing of pornography was not prosecuted in those times. In some nations, even purely textual erotic literature is still deemed illegal and is also prosecuted.

== See also ==
- Bedroom farce
- Hispano-Arabic homoerotic poetry
- List of authors of erotic works
- List of pornographic book publishers
- Literotica
- Pornography
- Pornotopia
- Romance novel
- Erotic literature and art in ancient Rome

== Sources ==
- Brulotte, Gaëtan & Phillips, John (eds.) (2006) Encyclopedia of Erotic Literature. New York: Routledge
- Gibson, Ian (2001) The Erotomaniac London: Faber & Faber
- H. Montgomery Hyde (1964) A History of Pornography. London: Heinemann
- Kearney, Patrick J. (1982) A History of Erotic Literature, Parragon, ISBN 1-85813-198-7
- Kronhausen, Phyllis & Eberhard (1959) Pornography and the Law, The Psychology of Erotic Realism and Pornography. New York: Ballantine Books
- Kronhausen, Phyllis & Eberhard (1969) Erotic Fantasies, a Study of Sexual Imagination. New York: Grove Press
- Muchembled, Robert (2008) Orgasm and the West: a history of pleasure from the 16th century to the present, Polity, ISBN 0-7456-3876-7
- Sontag, Susan (1969). The Pornographic Imagination in Styles of Radical Will. Picador. ISBN 0-312-42021-8.
- Weller, Michael J. The Secret Blue Book. Home Baked Books,, London.
- Williams, Linda (1999) Hardcore: Power, Pleasure, and the 'Frenzy of the Visible'. Berkeley: University of California Press
