= List of Anita Blake: Vampire Hunter characters =

The following is a list of fictional characters in Laurell K. Hamilton's Anita Blake: Vampire Hunter series of novels. The title character, Anita Blake starts as a human with the power of necromancy. She joins the organization Animators, Inc. as an animator: a person who raises zombies) and a vampire executioner. In later volumes, she acquires some powers that are commonly associated with vampires. She contracts the lycanthropy viruses which makes her associate with were-creatures. She also grows powers as a succubus.

== Human organizations ==
=== Animators, Inc. ===
==== Bert Vaughn ====
Bert is the founder and managing partner of Animators, Inc. Over 6 feet tall and built like a former athlete, Bert is an unscrupulous boss who is inclined to sign the animators up for almost any job if the price is right. He and Anita often clash over Bert's choices of potential clients and jobs for Anita. As of Cerulean Sins Bert's status was downgraded to business manager and most of the animators were upgraded to full partners. In previous books Anita had often thought about taking her business and clients away from Bert's micromanaging and attempts to schedule animators for jobs they deemed unethical or too dangerous.

Appearances: Most of the books.

==== Charles Montgomery ====
Charles is another animator who works for Animators, Inc. Because he is large and heavily built, Anita has asked him on at least one occasion (e.g. the Laughing Corpse) to serve as an unsubtle threat to ward off unwelcome attention in dangerous places. Charles is, however, nonviolent, and not suited to backing up the threat that his size and protective demeanor would otherwise indicate.
Appearances: Laughing Corpse.

==== Craig ====
Craig is the night secretary at Animators, Inc.
Appearances: Guilty Pleasures, The Lunatic Cafe.

==== Jamison Clarke ====
Jamison is an animator at Animators, Inc. He is a thin African-American with curly red hair and green eyes, who typically clashes with Anita over Anita's side job as vampire executioner. Unlike Anita, Jamison believes that vampires are essentially people, and disapproves of executing them without trial.
Appearances: Guilty Pleasures, The Laughing Corpse.

==== John Burke ====
Six feet tall with movie-star good looks and a white streak in his dark hair, John Burke is a powerful animator, vaundun priest, and vampire hunter. He was originally active in New Orleans, Louisiana, but moved to Saint Louis after his brother Peter (who could also raise zombies) was killed in that city. Burke also stated that the New Orleans police and he had had a "misunderstanding" over Burke's involvement in a series of murders. After moving to Saint Louis he and Anita dated briefly, and he accepted a job at Animators, Inc.

Appearances: The Laughing Corpse, Circus of the Damned.

==== Lawrence Kirkland ====
Five foot four and red-haired, Larry Kirkland reminds Anita of Howdy Doody. Larry first joined Animators, Inc. as a twenty-year-old co-op student and wants Anita to teach him to be a vampire hunter. Anita feels very protective towards Larry and doesn't want to see him killed. Larry is very powerful, probably a necromancer in his own right. Later married to Tammy Reynolds of RPIT. They have one child a girl, called Angel. Currently, he is a fully licensed vampire executioner, and the first to hold dual agency with the federal marshal service and the FBI.

Appearances: Circus of the Damned, Bloody Bones, Burnt Offerings, Micah, Incubus Dreams., Kiss the Dead, Dead Ice

==== Manny Rodriguez ====
An older, Mexican animator/vampire executioner, Manuel "Manny" Rodriguez is an animator at Animators, Inc., and was Anita's mentor, but is largely retired. Manny was present when he and Anita confronted Valentine's nest, before the events of Guilty Pleasures. Before his marriage and conversion to Christianity Manny was a vaundun priest who was involved with Dominga Salvador. At the request of his wife, Anita does not go hunting with Manny anymore, because he has a family to provide for.

Appearances: The Laughing Corpse (first mentioned in Guilty Pleasures).

==== Mary ====
Mary is the day secretary at Animators, Inc.
First appearance: Guilty Pleasures

=== RPIT ===
The Regional Preternatural Investigative Team (RPIT, pronounced rip-it), also known as the "spook squad"

==== Clive Perry ====
An extremely polite member of RPIT. African American. Anita has no idea what he did to get put on the squad (generally it's a punishment).

==== Dolph ====
In "Guilty Pleasures" Rudolph "Dolph" Storr is a Sergeant and is head of the RPIT. Six feet eight inches tall and built like a wrestler. He is normally extremely "by the book" and clean cut, with close cropped black hair and a neatly knotted tie and jacket, even at 4 a.m. crime scenes. At that point, Dolph was such an excellent police officer that Anita wondered what he had done to be assigned to RPIT, a low-status position within the police force.

Prior to the series and throughout the earlier books, Dolph was a friend and mentor to Anita. In the later books, Dolph and Anita's relationship has become strained, in part because Anita no longer believes that all vampires and shapeshifters are monsters, but Dolph still does, leading to distrust over Anita's increasingly close relationships with the various vampire and lycanthrope communities in St. Louis. Their relationship has also been strained by Dolph's personal situation; his son Darrin is married to a vampire (and possibly becoming one), and Dolph and his wife Lucille are grieving over the prospect of a life without grandchildren. (Dolph's younger son, Paul, cannot have children).

In the later books of the series, Dolph's personal problems and conflict with Anita appear to come to a head. This occurs because Dolph's son is dating a vampire and Dolph is afraid he will decide to join the Church of Eternal Life to stay with her. Dolph manhandles Anita at a crime scene, attempts to have Jason Schuyler locked up in a secured facility simply for being a werewolf, and is temporarily relieved of duty. Although Dolph is now back on duty, he and Anita are approaching their relationship carefully.

Appearances: Guilty Pleasures, The Laughing Corpse, Circus of the Damned, The Lunatic Cafe, Bloody Bones, The Killing Dance, Burnt Offerings, Blue Moon, Narcissus in Chains, Cerulean Sins, Incubus Dreams, The Harlequin, Kiss the Dead.

==== Tammy Reynolds ====
A Christian witch, married to Larry Kirkland and has a daughter named Angel with him. She is the first detective witch and she chose to work with RPIT. Being a witch, she knows more about detailed spells or rituals than Anita does. Anita knows the basic ideas behind stuff, she says she took a few general classes in college. Tammy is five foot ten inches in height, somewhere around Anita's age, but she still has an innocence like Larry does which is slowly being worn away with police work. She and Anita don't always see eye to eye.

First appearance: The Killing Dance, Burnt Offerings, Cerulean Sins, Kiss the Dead

==== Zerbrowski ====
Another friend and member of the spook squad, Sgt. Zerbrowski is the stereotypical rumpled, smart-alec, but highly competent detective and a loyal friend to Anita. He makes wisecracks about Anita's personal life and is a cheerful lech, making several inappropriate comments, but never really meaning any of them. Anita has told him he has very slight psychic abilities; but he is almost a null. His car is what Anita calls "a toxic waste zone" and his appearance is usually mismatched and unruly. Anita, along with almost everyone else, is surprised that he got Katie to marry him. Appearances: Most books.

== Vampire groups ==
=== St. Louis vampires ===
==== Aubrey ====
Centuries old (500–550) but not a Master, Aubrey was a very powerful lieutenant of Nikolaos. Aubrey was partially insane as a result of punishments received from Nikolaos. At her orders, he blackmailed Anita by enthralling ("deep rolling") and threatening to kill Anita's friend Catherine. Ultimately, Anita killed Aubrey with a silver-loaded shotgun.

Appearance: Guilty Pleasures.

==== Asher ====
Asher is a Master Vampire of Belle Morte's line, and the lover of Jean-Claude and Anita Blake. Asher was formerly part of a menage-a-trois with Jean-Claude and Asher's human servant Julianna, until the Church burned Julianna at the stake as a witch and tried to "burn the devil" out of Asher with holy water in a form of Chinese water torture. The holy water left Asher badly scarred, and for many years he blamed Jean-Claude for rescuing him too late, and for failing to save Julianna.

Anita was able to see beyond the terrible scarring and came to love him, overcoming Asher's hatred for Jean-Claude (though Asher still carries heavy emotional baggage). Asher is now Jean-Claude's second-in-command. His main vampiric power is fascination: people who are caught by his gaze are fascinated by him and can't look away; Belle Morte said people he rolls completely become "love-besotted fools" and follow him around; his bite is orgasmic, and his victim can have flashbacks of the orgasm hours or days later. Asher acquired Hyena as animal to call in Danse Macabre.

==== Bartolome ====
Formerly heir to a huge fortune, Bartolome is of Belle Morte's bloodline and a child vampire around the age of 12 or 13. At the end of Cerulean Sins, he chose to stay to help undo the damage he and Valentina inflicted on Gregory and Stephen thanks to Musette. For the most part, he is rather well-adjusted given the propensity of prepubescent vampires to go insane over time. He speaks fluent Spanish and English. He came along with Musette to St. Louis purely out of boredom.

Appearances: Cerulean Sins

==== Byron ====
Byron is an English vampire who was turned at 15 but, due to bulking up (exercising) his musculature, can pass for 18. Anita used Byron to feed the ardeur once (since he prefers males to females) although he regards himself to be bisexual. Byron was saved by Jean-Claude upon his master being killed by the Harlequin instead of being left to Belle Morte. Byron uses endearments such as Duckie and Lover towards Anita.

Appearances: Incubus Dreams, Danse Macabre, The Harlequin

==== Buzz ====
"Buzz the vampire" is a heavily muscled vampire bouncer at the club Guilty Pleasures. Approximately 20 years dead, Buzz doesn't display the inhuman mannerisms of older vampires. Buzz typically guards the entrance while wearing a T-shirt (regardless of weather conditions) and enjoys flashing his fangs, as well as, flirting with the girls he meets. Buzz engages in bodybuilding in order to enhance the development of his superhuman strength.

Appearances: Guilty Pleasures, The Lunatic Cafe, Incubus Dreams.

==== Damian ====
Damian is a green eyed, red haired Viking vampire. Through a series of accidents and emergencies, he became Anita's vampire servant (similar to the role of a vampire's human servant) and eventual lover, and as Anita's vampire servant, Damian became a member of Anita's second triumvirate with Nathaniel.

Damian was made by "She who must not be named" (later revealed to be Morvoren/Nemhain). He tends to have a calming effect on Anita, as shown in Cerulean Sins, because he was taught by she-who-made-him that her will was all important. His appearance changed slightly in Incubus Dreams, just enough to make him "breathtakingly" beautiful. Approximately 1000 years old, Damian will never be a master vampire, but because of the additional power of Anita and Nathaniel, he can physically walk in daylight—although doing so tends to drive him into a fear-induced insanity. This comes from witnessing Perrin, one of his Viking comrades who was also turned into a vampire, burst into flames from walking in the sunlight while he and the aforementioned Viking were in the "care" of Morvoren. When Anita works on improving her second triumvirate power base Damian goes from having to obey Anita if given a direct command to having more free will and can choose not to obey her. Anita does not like anyone being forced to obey her and it was one of the reasons she kept a slight distance with Damian for a few books, compared to other lovers.

Damian lives in Anita's basement and works at Danse Macabre. In later books Damian lives under ground at the Circus of the Damned and has his own room. He became slightly insane when Anita left St. Louis for six months, without her magic to control him or to make his heart beat.

Appearances: The Killing Dance, Burnt Offerings, Blue Moon, Narcissus in Chains, Cerulean Sins, Incubus Dreams, Danse Macabre, Bullet Crimson Death.

==== Dead Dave ====
Dave is an ex-cop who was kicked off the force after he became a vampire, under unrevealed circumstances and who now owns a bar called "Dead Dave's". Though mad at the police for kicking him off the force, Dave sells and gives information to Anita to aid her investigations.

First appearance: Guilty Pleasures

==== Gretchen ====
Jean-Claude made Gretchen a vampire almost 200 years ago. Pale, with wavy blond hair falling near to her waist, Gretchen is hopelessly in love with Jean-Claude in every sense of the word, and erroneously sees Anita as the primary obstacle to his love. Although she "has not used that name in 100 years", Gretchen (diminutive of Margarete, like in Faust) was originally named Gretel (diminutive of Grete), and Jean-Claude still at times calls her by that name. A master vampire, she has strong mental powers, a resistance to silver, and the power of flight.

In The Lunatic Cafe, Gretchen attacks Anita, and as punishment, Jean-Claude had her confined to a coffin wrapped in crosses and chains for three years. Due to needing power and energy, partly due to vampire politics and partly due to Anita's stubbornness in various issues, reduces her to a skeletal state (withdrawing her animating force, as her creator.) In Narcissus in Chains, Anita learns that Gretchen is still confined and forces Jean-Claude to free her. However, Gretchen still hates Anita for coming between her and Jean Claude, and in Cerulean Sins, Anita states that Gretchen's confinement has driven her "even crazier" than she was before. In Blood Noir; Gretchen goes on live television and answers news reporters questions about a false rumor concerning Anita and Jean Claude's relationship. She tries to make viewers believe Anita left Jean Claude for Jason and is an extremely immoral person. (Gretchen used bad words on TV concerning Anita's morals) Gretchen ends up looking “crazy” on TV with her extreme comments. Gretchens comments, while false, made Jean Claude look like a “weak master” to other vampires. Anita and Jason had to do “damage control” due to Gretchens comments.

Appearances: The Lunatic Cafe, Narcissus in Chains, Blood Noir.

==== Hannah ====
Hannah is the vampiric lady love of Willie McCoy. Willie refers to her as Angel Fangs. Hannah also gets possessed by the Traveler when Vampire Council members are in town. Hamilton erroneously called her "Candy" in The Harlequin; she later wrote in her blog that Candy had been Hannah's original name during the first draft of Burnt Offerings, and that the mistake will be corrected for the paperback edition of the book.

First appearance: Burnt Offerings

==== Jean-Claude ====
Master of the City of St Louis, Jean-Claude is the lover of Anita Blake. He is said to be between 400 and 600 years old, an exact age is never given, except Danse Macabre Ch. 24, Kiss the Dead, Ch. 7, Affliction, Ch. 3, 38,39, Dead Ice Ch. 9, 38, Crimson Death Ch. 19, 33, where it is said to be six hundred. He is part of the triumvirate consisting of Anita Blake and Ulfric of the St. Louis werewolves, Richard Zeeman. He is what in earlier times would be called an incubus. He carries the ardeur, which is like a sexual vampirism. He passed this onto Anita.

==== Liv ====
A large Nordic vampire with bodybuilder muscles who pledged her loyalty to Jean-Claude when he became Master of the City of St. Louis. Jealous of Jean-Claude's affection for Anita, Liv later betrays him and his followers to the Traveler, who had promised her the ability to kill or at least dominate Anita. Anita was only minorly affected but punished Liv with final death for her betrayal and for her role in Padma's abuses of several local werecreatures. Specifically, Anita promised Sylvie (second in command under Richard) that Liv would be killed for sexually assaulting Sylvie when she refused to “give” Padma the pack while Richard was out of town.

Appearances: The Killing Dance, Burnt Offerings.

==== London ====
A master vampire of Belle Morte's line that recently moved to St. Louis; often called "The Dark Knight". He can feed the ardeur every two hours, which makes him a potential potent pomme de sang, but the drawback is that he becomes addicted to the ardeur. London made a deal with Jean-Claude to protect him from his addiction (and Belle Morte, who had used it against him), but he later becomes addicted to Anita's ardeur.

Appearances: Danse Macabre

==== Malcolm ====
A powerful 300-year-old master vampire, Malcolm is head of the Church of Eternal Life in St. Louis. Anita is not altogether happy with this organization, since it tends to create plenty of emotionally unstable young vampires as many of their converts are angst-ridden teenagers. He is described by Anita to be an "undead Billy Graham." Malcolm has not required blood-oaths of the vampires under him, hence he has no control over them except their words of obedience, which provides no assurance the vampires of the church will not become dangerous predators.

Unfortunately, other branches of the Church nationwide have likewise not blood-oathed their members. Worse yet, Incubus Dreams reveals the Church is holding back on teaching its vampires, in effect not showing the members how to be vampires to their full potential or explaining the effects of what they can now do. For example, the Church considers drinking from the inner thigh "too sexual" and does not explain how to do so without the donor bleeding to death.

Unlike many of the Church's members, Malcolm himself is aware of his vampiric psychic powers, and Anita knows of two: He can make himself appear to be more handsome than he is, and he is able to read the minds of anyone he shakes hands with.

Unlike most vampires in the series, Malcolm is extremely religious; he says that being undead has not changed his beliefs. When threatened by the Harlequin, he asks Anita to find a priest to hear his confession, so he can die absolved. Anita found a priest willing and it was stated that it took three days to hear his confession.

First appearance: Guilty Pleasures.

==== Meng Die ====
Meng Die is short, delicate, and described by Anita as resembling a "China doll." She typically dresses in skin-tight leather. Originally turned by Jean-Claude himself, Meng Die is an extremely powerful master vampire, an accomplished fighter, and like Jean-Claude himself can call wolves. Unlike many of the master vampires of Belle Morte's bloodline, Meng Die does not appear to possess any variant of the ardeur. Although she is sexually accomplished, she does not have any particular abilities related to love or lust.

Meng Die is powerful enough to become a master of a city in her own right, and aggressive enough that her former master of the city in San Francisco, was happy to "loan" her to Jean-Claude, thereby reducing the risk that she would try to seize her former master's territory for herself. It was mentioned a few different times that she was a day or two from killing him and taking over. Jean-Claude originally invites her to visit his territory in order to increase his strength and defend his territory against challengers. However, once Jean-Claude acquires other, less difficult master vampires, he begins to regret inviting Meng Die into his retinue, as her power, aggression and sexual jealousy of Anita make her one of the most difficult of his vampires to control.

Meng Die particularly resents Anita because one of her lovers, Requiem has left her in order to increase his chances of forming a relationship with Anita. She attempts to kill him with a silver knife and injures him in the process. Afterward, she is locked into a coffin bound with crosses and chains. She cracks the coffin with a power spike from Jean Claude and is finally released in Danse Macabre.

At the end of Bullet she volunteers herself to take over as Master of Atlanta. Appearances: Narcissus in Chains, Cerulean Sins, Incubus Dreams, Danse Macabre, Bullet

==== Nikolaos ====
The Master of the City of Saint Louis in Guilty Pleasures and over 1,000 years old. Nikolaos had the appearance of a young girl around age 12 and sounded like Shirley Temple when not angry. Her mental abilities and physical strength were formidable and frightening. Nikolaos had a variety of Master-level abilities: she could call to rats and wererats, fly, generate powerful storm force winds with her mind, and be awake during daylight. Anita kills Nikolaos at the end of Guilty Pleasures by cutting her head off and stabbing her in the heart with Burchard's sword. Based on the description, Nikolaos has some of the traits of what Hamilton later describes as a nighthag – a vampire that could draw power from fear (as much as any other overbearing, sadistic bully) but she lacks the telltale sign of decomposing on her victims during sex and/or feedings, which are the favorite pastimes of rotting vampires and have no connection to nighthags altogether.

First (and only) Appearance: Guilty Pleasures.

==== Primo ====
With brute strength (plus being a powerful vampire who formerly regarded the Dragon as his mistress), Primo works under the guidance of Buzz at Guilty Pleasures and repeatedly lets people enter who are not permitted, thus causing fights until Jean-Claude and Anita intervene. Primo is almost powerful enough to beat Jean-Claude until Anita steps in and blood-oaths him. He wants to be master of the city but is not powerful enough. Primo seems to feed off violence such as the manner in which Jean-Claude feeds on sex. Also caused Anita "harm from a distance" and can rapidly heal fatal wounds by drinking the blood of a supernatural creature.

First Appearance: Incubus Dreams

==== Requiem ====
Jean-Claude's third in command, Requiem is a British-born vampire that Belle Morte offered to buy from his master to complete her blue-eyed trio: Jean-Claude the Darkest, Asher the Lightest, and Requiem the Brightest-eyed. He has the power to raise lust—straight lust—similar to Jean-Claude's ardeur (Anita describes his power as "like hours of really good foreplay packed into seconds"). However, Requiem is always fiercely polite and sees taking advantage of this power as rape, refusing to use it uninvited. He has black hair and a trimmed mustache. His name comes from being "poetic, but damn depressing".

Appearances: Incubus Dreams, Danse Macabre, The Harlequin, Skin Trade

==== Robert ====
A beautiful blonde, Robert is first introduced as one of the strippers at Guilty Pleasures and later is promoted to become its manager. Although a century old, Robert is essentially a coward and repeatedly backs down in confrontations with Jean-Claude's enemies.

Robert marries Monica Vespucci and they are able to conceive a child. Shortly thereafter, Robert is killed by Sabin's triumvirate as part of a plot to heal Sabin.

Appearances: Guilty Pleasures, The Lunatic Cafe, Bloody Bones, The Killing Dance.

==== Truth ====
Brother of Wicked, Truth is nearly killed trying to capture a fleeing vampire from the Church of Eternal Life on Anita's command. He is blood oathed by Anita. With Wicked, he helped to slay his entire bloodline, and together he and his brother have traveled alone for years. Noted warriors, the brothers are called "The Wicked Truth."

Their bloodline has extreme speed and can pass for human, even to witches. If the vampire council wanted shapeshifters killed they sent for Wicked and Truth's bloodline, the "warrior elite".

During Skin Trade, Truth was afraid of Anita because she held the ardeur and that she'd be a monster in the end just like Belle Morte. His thoughts change when he hears her fear of that same thing and both brothers promise that they'll kill her if that ever happened. He is the more modest of the brothers.

Appearances: Incubus Dreams, Danse Macabre, The Harlequin, Skin Trade, Bullet, Affliction

==== Valentina ====
Sultry, violent little Valentina is a child vampire created by a vampire pedophile (her first, former lover). Valentina is Musette's helper, an expert torturer, and one of the few who has seen Marmee Noir in person. Dispensing pain is Valentina's method of sublimating her overwhelmingly powerful, intense, and insatiable sexual appetite because she is a small child (and thus has difficulty finding adequate sexual encounters with partners who "fit"). Jean-Claude describes Valentina as disturbed; for example, she is fond of trying to break strangers. However, Valentina is not without a sense of honor and despises violent child molesters (who don't respect love, seduction, and mutual consent). Along with Bartolome, Valentina chooses to stay in order to reverse the damage they did to Stephen and Gregory. Anita strongly suspects Valentina also stayed because the child is somewhat afraid of Marmee Noir. Valentina is also of Belle Morte's bloodline; and Belle refers to the hot af little fem-tot as "Petite Morte" – Little Death.

Appearances: Cerulean Sins, Danse Macabre, Bullet

==== Valentine ====
A vampire with dozens of human kills, Valentine was the only vampire survivor of an earlier fight between his nest of vampires and Anita, Manny, and Edward. During that fight, Anita received the scars she possessed at the beginning of Guilty Pleasures, and Valentine's face was scarred by holy water. Valentine promised to kill Anita when Anita's work for Nikolaos was completed, but was himself killed by Anita. He wore a mask to cover his scars.

Appearance: Guilty Pleasures.

==== Wicked ====
Brother to Truth, Wicked is a vampire of considerable power. Together with his brother, he was able to kill his entire bloodline after their Sourdre de Sang went insane and the vampires of their line began randomly killing people. The council voted on whether or not to kill Wicked and Truth also, with Belle Morte actually voting to save them, but the brothers were left masterless, which weakened them. After traveling alone and masterless for many years, in Incubus Dreams, Anita binds the brothers to Jean-Claude. Wicked and Truth ("The Wicked Truth") are considered among the greatest of all vampire warriors.

Although in Incubus Dreams it is stated that Wicked is not a master, in a later book, Danse Macabre, he is a master vampire. It is unclear whether this is a continuity error, or if being masterless had reduced his power enough that he was no longer a master vampire.

Their bloodline has extreme speed and can pass for human, even to witches. If the vampire council wanted shapeshifters killed they sent for Wicked and Truth's bloodline, the "warrior elite".

Appearances: Incubus Dreams, Danse Macabre, The Harlequin, Skin Trade, Bullet, Affliction

==== Willie McCoy ====
Willie is a small-time hood turned vampire. The first vampire friend of Anita's, he is one of only two or three vampires Anita has known before and after being turned. Willie is dating the vampire Hannah. He manages "The Laughing Corpse" for Jean-Claude. Willie also gets possessed by the Traveler when Vampire Council members are in town.

Appearances: Guilty Pleasures, The Laughing Corpse, The Killing Dance, Burnt Offerings

==== Yasmeen ====
An "exotic" looking master vampire with dark skin and hair, Yasmeen and her human servant, Marguerite, are Jean-Claude's allies during the events of Circus of the Damned. Yasmeen is difficult to control and threatens Anita and Larry whenever she has the opportunity. She also enjoys making Marguerite jealous. She gets torn apart by Alejandro in the final battle of that novel.

Appearance: Circus of the Damned.

=== Branson vampires ===
Sometime after Jean-Claude's ascension to Master of St. Louis (after Guilty Pleasures and before the events in Bloody Bones), the Vampire Council decided that Branson, Missouri had become sufficiently populous to split off from Jean-Claude's territory and support its own group of vampires. They promised Jean-Claude that they would appoint a vampire of equal or lesser power to himself, and permitted Seraphina and her retinue to take up residence in Branson.

=== Myerton vampires ===
The apparently fictional city of Myerton, Tennessee served as the setting for Blue Moon, the eighth novel in the Anita Blake series.

==== Barnaby ====
A rotting vampire; second-in-command to Colin. Presumed dead. Barnaby was a master vampire who used his bite to spread corruption, a power believed to be unique only to Morte d'Amour, so he is presumably of this council member's line. His bite nearly killed Nathaniel, but Asher and Damian were able to save his life with the help of Anita's necromantic powers

==== Colin ====
Master Vampire of the city of Myerton, Tennessee. He was not convinced when Anita came to rescue Richard from jail that she did not mean to replace him with Asher, who came with her. He decided to challenge Anita and lost nearly half his vampires during their first encounter.

He was a nighthag – a vampire who could cause and feed on fear. Damian described his former master as having the same ability. He also said they carry around a constant aura of fear that can't be turned off.

Colin had Barnaby use his ability of infectious rot on Nathaniel, which nearly made him rot from the inside out, but Anita saved him with the help of Asher and Damian. Supposedly it was a compliment, the torturing or infecting of Nathaniel because if Colin did not believe Anita could have saved Nathaniel, Colin wouldn't have infected him.

Colin had a human servant named Nikki, who was a native-American necromancer, but not as powerful as Anita. Colin died after Anita killed Nikki.

=== New Mexico vampires ===
In Obsidian Butterfly, Anita meets a number of vampires based in the vicinity of Albuquerque and Santa Fe.

==== Itzpapalotl ====
The Master of the City of Albuquerque and approximately one thousand years old, Itzpapalotl (translated as Obsidian Butterfly) is an Aztec vampire who believes herself to be the goddess Itzpapalotl. Due to her having killed any vampire or human servant that has wandered into the city for the last 50 years, the vampire council has forbidden entry into her territory. Anita is the only one who was not murdered, most likely because Itzpapalotl was intrigued by the triumvirate that Anita is a part of. Itzpapalotl exchanged the secret of manipulating certain forms of life energy for how the triumvirate was formed.

Unlike many other master vampires, Itzpapalotl cannot tell when someone is lying. Anita believes this is because Itzpapalotl is lying to herself, since she truly believes she is a god. Itzpapalotl gave Anita a taste of her own power in order to get the information she wanted and the power left Anita with eyes that were completely black. Eventually, Anita's eyes changed back, but abilities Anita gained from her exchange with Itzpapalotl have lingered on and are usually accompanied by the change in eye color.

==== Red Woman's Husband ====
Another centuries-old vampire who believed he was a god, he was ultimately behind the mutilation murders and victims, although his servants may have been the actual perpetrators. He wanted to use Anita as a sacrifice, thinking that her mortality would make him immortal and yet mortal. So he could sacrifice himself to awaken the other gods. "Red Woman" is the name of the Aztec goddess of blood, in the Anitaverse. Itzpapalotl had some hand in Anita's defeat of him, because after Anita had a taste of her power, she was less affected by him.

==== Diego ====
One of the original Spanish conquerors of the Aztecs, Diego was one of twelve men who raped four priestesses five hundred years ago (and is still being punished by Itzpapalotl for that crime). Itzpapalotl turned the twelve men into vampires and has exacted "justice" on them for as long as they have survived; and Diego is one of the last three remaining. Diego intended to show Anita the manner in which "a god feeds". However, he refused to take the blood offering from an intimate place, and so Diego was beaten by the four priestesses (also turned into vampires by Itzpapalotl).

== Lycanthropes and shapeshifter groups ==
=== Lukoi ===
The Lukoi are a group of shapeshifters, named after King Lykaon of Arcadia, who Richard describes as an ancient king who did not hide that he was a werewolf. (In Greek myth, Lycaon was the first king of Arcadia and was cursed by Zeus to turn into a wolf).

==== Cassandra ====
About Anita's height, with wavy, waist-length brown hair and hazel eyes, Cassandra claimed to be a new werewolf in town. In reality, she was a member of a triumvirate with Sabin and Dominic and was part of a plot to sacrifice Anita, Jean-Claude, and Richard in order to save Sabin from a fatal wasting illness (which had been brought on by not drinking human blood, to please Cassandra). Their scheme was unsuccessful, and Harley killed Cassandra during the attempted ritual.

Appearance: The Killing Dance

==== Gwen ====
Sylvie Barker's girlfriend, a psychiatrist and a powerful werewolf, with long wavy blond hair and a dainty, "china doll" appearance.

Appearances: Burnt Offerings.

==== Jamil ====
Skoll, or first enforcer of the St. Louis pack. Jamil is just shy of six feet, with rich brown skin and waist-length hair woven into corn rows. He is an alpha werewolf with enough power to keep Richard out when Richard lets his power wash over the pack.

Jamil had been Skoll for the pack under Marcus, and tradition dictated that the new Ulfric kill him upon taking over the pack, but Richard let him live to ease the transition. Jamil is thus very loyal to Richard. He and Anita originally had a good relationship, but when Anita was forced to use Obsidian's power to feed on him he feared her enough that Anita says she's lost a friend.

Jamil becomes Richard’s most trusted body guard.

Gwen commented that Jamil is homophobic, saying that he thought "every lesbian woman was a woman waiting for the right man".

First Appearance: The Killing Dance, Blue Moon, Bullet

==== Jason Schuyler ====
Stripper at Guilty Pleasures, best friend to Nathaniel, occasional lover of Anita, also Jean-Claude's pomme de sang. He's in his early 20s now, having met Anita when he was younger, he's a Gemini, has blonde "baby-fine" hair and sky blue eyes. Jason is also Anita's height and loves to tease her or flaunt his being a stripper and/or sexuality. Lately he has been quite pleased to get a blush from Anita after "taking one for the team" because before, he was not on her guy radar for possible sex partners. He was always just in the background, but in later books the readers learn more about his background and about him. He has an intense fear of rotting vampires or anything similar due to being rotted on by two vampires (Bettina and Pallas) in a sexual context. Jason's hometown is near Asheville, North Carolina.

In Narcissus in Chains, Jason has cut his hair short "businessman short", and in the more recent novels, Jason has taken on a more complex role as Anita's friend and sometimes "fuck-buddy", showing a surprisingly quick and discerning mind, quick to assuage Anita's fears when she breaks down after having tortured Deputy Thompson in Blue Moon, and to point out how she has been neglecting Nathaniel's sexual needs at the beginning of Incubus Dreams. Hence, Anita has begun to understand and incorporate more S&M into her sexual roles with Nathaniel. Anita comments in following books that in any other scenario being tied up would terrify her but with Nathaniel and the right context it turns her on, which she does not quite seem to understand but is starting to accept.

As Jean Claude states so eloquently, Jason is the only person that can give Anita hard truths and not make her angry. He is one of her closest friends and someone that teaches her that there are different types of love. He also becomes Anita's wolf to call in Blood Noir. (His name at Guilty Pleasure is 'Ripley', from Alien.)

Appearances: The Lunatic Cafe, Bloody Bones, The Killing Dance, Burnt Offerings, Blue Moon, Narcissus in Chains, Cerulean Sins, Incubus Dreams, Danse Macabre, The Harlequin, Blood Noir, Flirt, Bullet "Hit List"

==== Irving Griswold ====
A short, balding werewolf with a day job as an investigative reporter for a Saint Louis newspaper. Irving remains closeted at his day job in order to avoid discrimination, and frequently exchanges information with Anita. Irving was particularly persistent in his attempts to meet and interview Jean-Claude, but got more than he bargained for.

Appearances: Guilty Pleasures, The Laughing Corpse, Circus of the Damned, The Lunatic Cafe, Narcissus in Chains, Blood Noir.

==== Marcus Fletcher ====
He was the former Ulfric of the werewolf pack. He was a surgeon and one of the pack's only doctors. He had a lupa named Raina, who together helped put both werewolves and wereleopards into pornographic snuff films. He was killed by Richard in a battle for supremacy and eaten by the entire pack.

Appearances: The Lunatic Cafe, The Killing Dance.

==== Raina Wallis ====
Raina was a fantastically beautiful werewolf. She was the lupa of the werewolves, "psychotic bitch", and an extreme sadist. She often used her sexuality to manipulate other wolves into doing her bidding. She and Marcus helped punish werewolves and wereleopards for refusing her by putting them into pornographic snuff films. She was shot and killed by Anita while trying to have Anita killed in one of her snuff films in The Killing Dance. Ironically, Raina's "munin" (spirit) now "haunts" Anita . Sometimes Anita calls her to get information or help with healing. In return Anita must do her a favor (usually something sexual).

Appearances: The Lunatic Cafe, The Killing Dance. In munin form in most of the books following The Killing Dance.

==== Rashida ====
Rashida is one of the werewolves attending Jean-Claude in Circus of the Damned. She is beautiful and slender, with dark skin and a close-cropped haircut.

Appearances: Circus of the Damned.

==== Richard Zeeman ====
Richard, the ulfric or "wolf-king" of the local werewolf pack, is one of Anita's primary love interests. Richard Zeeman is a junior high school science teacher who has to hide his lycanthropy from everyone but his pack and his love Anita. Along with the undead community. He tries so hard to get Anita's attention though the books for so long but eventually he somewhat gives up. He decided that he didn't want to share her anymore. He started to search for another lupa. yet he has not found one anywhere close to being what Anita was to him and that is what he secretly wishes for. After some months in therapy he rejoins Jean Claude and Anita's triumvirate with a more accepting attitude.

First Appearance: Circus of the Damned

==== Shang-Da ====
Hati, or second enforcer of the St. Louis pack. He is a tall man of Chinese descent and an unnervingly intense gaze. Unlike many shapeshifters, Shang-Da prefers elegant clothes (with polished wingtip shoes) for everyday wear.

Shang-Da transferred from the San Francisco Bay pack and took the role of Richard's Hati without any fights, as no one else wanted the position that badly. He is also one of Richard’s body guards. Shang-Da has a strong dislike for Anita due to the fact that she hurt Richard in the only way Shang-Da couldn't protect him from by being repeatedly unfaithful and a bad Lupa.

He is the first lycanthrope that Anita met who carries a gun, a snub nose .38, and is comfortable doing so.

First Appearance: Blue Moon.

==== Stephen ====
Slightly taller than Anita, with blond hair and blue eyes, Anita describes Stephen as beautiful as a china doll. Stephen is one of the strippers at Jean-Claude's club Guilty Pleasures (stage name "Harlow") and serves as one of Jean-Claude's personal wolves. He is one of the many beautiful yet vulnerable sex workers Anita takes under her wing during the course of the series. He shows attachment to both Anita and Richard. When Raina tries to force him to be in her films, Anita saves him. His twin brother Gregory is a wereleopard. Stephen has been dating the wereleopard Vivian.

Appearances: Circus of the Damned, The Lunatic Cafe, The Killing Dance, Burnt Offerings, Narcissus in Chains, Cerulean Sins, Bullet

==== Sylvie Barker ====
Richard's Geri, or second-in-command and a good friend to Anita. She is a lesbian except for The Harlequin where she suddenly proclaims; "Nothing personal, Anita. I mean you're cute, but I don't do women, and with you this weak, and Jean-Claude out of it, I don't want to take the chance that this thing spreads through the room.", has short curly brown hair and is about five foot six inches, and has dated Gwen. Sylvie is an alpha were and one of the few others, besides Richard, that can partially shapeshift. She also has a collection of bones that came from her enemies, such as Fernando, Padma's son. She occasionally takes out the collection and runs her hands over the bones to comfort herself.

Appearances: The Killing Dance, Burnt Offerings, Blue Moon, Narcissus in Chains, The Harlequin.

=== Pard ===
The Pard are a group of were-leopards.

==== Caleb ====
One of Micah's leopards, with a penchant for body piercing. He has a bit of a wise ass streak and a tendency to ignore orders. He used to rape Gina and Violet on Chimera's orders

First appearance: Narcissus in Chains.

==== Cherry ====
Cherry is tall and slender, a natural blonde, clear-headed and a fount of information, but not someone Anita completely trusts to effectively guard her back. Unlike most known shapeshifters, Cherry more or less consented to receive her lycanthropy (from Gabriel), since it enabled her to regrow a leg that was severed in an automobile accident shortly before. She was a nurse before they found out she was a lycanthrope, and one of the few local weres that has medical knowledge. When it was revealed to her bosses that she was a lycanthrope, she was one of the first to be laid off because of "budget cuts"; Cherry now more or less flaunts her lycanthropy via exceptionally sensual attire and behavior in public. She acts as Anita's medic when needed, and can assist Dr. Lillian. She and Zane were once lovers and remain very close. In the privacy of a home environment she prefers to remain nude.

Appearances: Burnt Offerings, Blue Moon, Narcissus in Chains, The Harlequin.

==== Elizabeth ====
She made Gabriel a lycanthrope. Though the other leopards believe they miss the way things were when Gabriel was Leader, in truth Elizabeth is the only one who truly misses him. She hates Anita because she herself isn't strong enough to lead the pard. In the novel Narcissus in Chains she leaves Nathaniel in a club in which he is kidnapped along with Gregory by Marco.

Appearances: The Lunatic Cafe. Narcissus in Chains.

==== Gabriel ====
A sinister looking wereleopard with dark curly hair, Gabriel was the alpha of the St. Louis pard, The Blood Drinkers. While living, Gabriel was called leoparde lionne (a protective leader) by pard members. Posthumously, pard members admitted Gabriel led as a lion passant.

Gabriel was a severe sadomasochist who contracted lycanthropy when Elizabeth shifted into leopard form during sex and mauled him nearly to death, the crowning moment of his life. Gabriel forced his pard to participate in Raina's pornography operation, and eventually fixated on the idea of raping and mauling Anita on film while she attempted to kill him. Anita was successful in that scenario, and Gabriel died.

According to his pard, Gabriel was called a lion passant, because he ruled but did not actively protect the pard. Although Gabriel did protect the pard in some ways, such as helping Zane quit drugs, protecting Nathaniel as he explored his darker urges, and helping Cherry to regenerate a severed leg, he was not willing to risk his personal safety for the pard.

Appearances: The Lunatic Cafe, The Killing Dance.

==== Gina ====
One of the two females from Micah's original pard, the Maneaters. Both female weres were kept by Chimera as hostages and tortured extensively to ensure Micah's cooperation.

First appearance: Narcissus in Chains.

==== Gregory ====
His twin brother Stephen is a werewolf. Like his brother, Gregory is a stripper (stage name: "Marlowe") at Jean-Claude's strip club Guilty Pleasures. When they were children, they were sexually abused and pimped-out by their father Anthony Dietrich. Gregory played a role in Raina's porn movies, raping and hurting the werewolves, including his brother Stephen, but only because his Nimir-Raj ordered it; once Anita became the Nimir-Ra, he stopped. Gregory made up for his prior actions when he chose torture over hurting the pard. Later, Gregory was held up at a club, and in the crossfire of a fight, accidentally stabbed Anita while in animal form, leading many to believe she might turn into a wereleopard. Gregory was sentenced to trial for "killing the Lupa" by the Lukois since Anita as a wereleopard can no longer be the Lukoi's Lupa. Gregory was tortured, bound, drugged and held captive underground but Anita managed to save him. He is often on call to help her and around for support, making snide remarks about how everyone gets to sleep with her but him. Despite a more negative relationship previously, Gregory and brother Stephen show intense family love for each other many times.

Appearances: The Killing Dance, Burnt Offerings, Narcissus in Chains, Incubus Dreams, Bullet

==== Merle ====
Stepped down as Nimir-Raj of Micah's pard in favor of Micah. Now bodyguard to Micah, resembles an aging biker. Merle wouldn't sacrifice his human form for his pard, the Maneater Clan, so Micah stepped in and attempted to stand up to Chimera. After they were freed from Chimera, it was Merle who punished Noah and Caleb for their behavior towards the female pard members.

First appearance: Narcissus in Chains.

==== Micah Callahan ====
Micah Callahan arrived in St. Louis as the Nimir-Raj of the Maneater Clan. Merging his pard with Anita's pard, the Blooddrinkers Pard, (Note: The term "pard" is fictional, since leopards are solitary and werelopards don't exist. A group of leopards typically consists of mother and one or two cubs; such a group is called a "leap" or "prowl") they rule as Nimir-Raj (King) and Nimir-Ra (Queen). Micah is coordinator of the Lycanthrope Coalition, and is also Anita's live-in lover. He is also one of her closest companions along with Nathaniel.

Micah has many unique powers as a shape-shifter. He can heal others by 'calling flesh.' He has the ability to shape-shift quickly, and is not tired or ill from the effort. He has chartreuse yellow/green eyes that won't shift back to human eyes, a result of too much time in animal form, forced by Chimera. He is about the same height and same size as Anita, with rich brown hair, very large genitalia, and is extremely easy-going. He does, however, share an antagonistic relationship with Richard, who feels that Micah has usurped his place. Micah has also been known to have a very abusive past. Their old leader Chimera, who was killed in Narcissus in Chains, forced him into animal form too often permanently turning his eyes. His nose was broke and Anita finds it healing later in the books. As of the novel Bullet, Micah has a deep relationship with Nathaniel, while continuing his romance with Anita, the two even show public displays of affection growing from verbal acknowledgment to full on make out sessions written later in the series. Micah eventually ask Anita and Nathaniel to marry him. He gains the black tiger, from Dev, which is another animal form besides his black leopard.

First appearance: Narcissus in Chains (appears in all subsequent books)

==== Nathaniel Graison ====
Nathaniel is a striking wereleopard in his early twenties, 5'7" with long mahogany auburn hair, lilac eyes, "pretty" rather than handsome features, and a muscular swimmer's body. In his animal form, Nathaniel is a black were-leopard. A stripper at Guilty Pleasures, (stage name: "Brandon"), Nathaniel is one of Anita's lovers and a member of her second triumvirate. For several novels, Nathaniel was Anita's pomme de sang. Descriptions of Nathaniel's eyes and vanilla scent fill each book, and it is common to see paragraphs devoted to the shade of his eyes.

Nathaniel has mentally blocked most of his past. However, when he becomes part of Anita's triumvirate we learn that Nathaniel's parents died when he was young, and that Nathaniel and his older brother Nicky were in the custody of an abusive man. Nicky protected Nathaniel at first, but also died when Nathaniel was quite young, at which point Nathaniel ran away at age 7, and at age 10 still living on the streets was forced to become a prostitute. At 17, Nathaniel was found by Gabriel. By that point, Nathaniel was a drug addicted prostitute, and was so submissive and masochistic that he was literally incapable of saying no to any torture proposed to him. Gabriel helped Nathaniel stop taking drugs and then pimped him out more as submissive to wealthy clients who liked to inflict pain on wereanimales, and manipulated Nathaniel into making pornographic movies.

After Anita took control of the St. Louis pard, Nathaniel attached himself to Anita for protection. Nathaniel has been working to become more assertive and self-reliant, if only to please Anita. He is still highly submissive and is happy to take the "wife" position in Anita's increasingly large harem – cleaning, cooking, and generally providing emotional support. In Incubus Dreams, Anita inadvertently marked Nathaniel as her animal to call, forming a triumvirate between Anita, Nathaniel, and Damian.

In The Harlequin, Nathaniel finally shows some burgeoning self-assertion, insisting to Anita that if she does not address his masochistic sexual needs, he will go elsewhere for what he wants.

Appearances: Burnt Offerings, Blue Moon, Narcissus in Chains, Cerulean Sins, Incubus Dreams, Danse Macabre, The Harlequin, Blood Noir, Flirt, Bullet, Kiss the Dead, Affliction

==== Noah ====
One of Micah's bodyguards. Third in line for the Maneater Clan's leadership. Used to rape Gina and Violet on Chimera's orders.

Appearances: Narcissus in Chains, Cerulean Sins.

==== Violet ====
One of the two females from Micah's original pard, the Maneaters. Both female weres were kept by Chimera as hostages and tortured extensively to ensure Micah's cooperation.

First appearance: Narcissus in Chains (mention only.)

==== Vivian ====
Hamilton describes Vivian as African-American, with Irish genetics as well, for a very pale but dark coloring. She makes Anita think of a delicate beautiful doll and feel protective of her. Anita believes she is the most beautiful woman she has ever met, perfect in proportion with brown eyes. Throughout the mid and later novels, Vivian has been dating Stephen, a werewolf and Gregory's twin. (As explained by Richard in the novel Narcissus In Chains, interspecies dating of shape-shifters is acceptable as long as the shifters are not alphas, as long as they are weak they can date whoever they want without social stress. Alphas, however normally date their own species, with some maverick exceptions such as Richard and Anita.)

Appearances: Burnt Offerings, Narcissus in Chains, Bullet

==== Zane ====
Tried to be alpha and pimp when Gabriel died; happy to hand things over to Anita. Has an on-again off-again relationship with Cherry. He is described as being tall and thin with multiple piercings and frequently changes the color of his hair. Has fangs on upper and lower teeth that won't shift back (result of too much time in animal form). Jason has also described him as being a "bisexual bastard".

Appearances: Burnt Offerings, Blue Moon, Narcissus in Chains, Incubus Dreams (mention only)

=== Rodere ===
Rodere are clans of wererats.

==== Bobby Lee ====
Bodyguard for Anita, he is an ex-mercenary and has worked for and with some questionable types, including white supremacists. He has a thick southern drawl and claims to be from so far down south that St. Louis is "Yankee" territory to him. Bobby Lee and Anita have become friends, and they now share a private joke. Bobby Lee has a tendency to address Anita as "girl", and Anita reminds him "Don't call me 'girl', Bobby Lee." He responds, "Yes, ma'am." Then they look at each other and smile.

First appearance: Narcissus in Chains.

==== Claudia ====
Bodyguard for Anita. She stands at around 6'6. More muscular than most men, and with a take-no-guff attitude. Comfortable with handguns. Also described as beautiful even without makeup. When Anita briefly believed she might be pregnant, Claudia became extremely protective of her, even staring down Richard, whom she dislikes for his idea of how women should be. She backs Anita in her fight against Haven, saying she has always wanted to fight with some of the men in Anita's life.

Appearances: Narcissus in Chains, Danse Macabre, The Harlequin, Bullet, Kiss the Dead, Affliction

==== Cris ====
Former bodyguard for Anita. Killed in an ambush at Narcissus in Chains.

Appearance: Narcissus in Chains

==== Dino ====
Dino is as dark as Emmanuel is light. He is six feet tall and almost as wide as he was tall. He runs like a lumbering elephant but he fights so well that Anita never wants to go against him for real. He is one of the few fighters who had exploded one of the new 'heavy bags' designed to stand up to pretranatural strength. He is security at the Circus.

Appearance: Bullet

==== Emmanuel ====
One of the few blue-grey-eyed Hispanics met by Anita. His skin is almost a gold color. He is security for the Circus. He is five-eight and nicely muscular.

Appearance: Bullet

==== Fernando ====
Fernando was a wererat and the son of the Master of Beasts. He was tall, slender, dark-skinned and wore nothing but a pair of black satin pants with silver embroidery along the legs. Fernando came to St. Louis along with his father and the rest of the Council delegation. He was not powerful enough to dominate Rafael and wanted his father to torture him. He also abused Hannah and raped Sylvie and Vivian.

Anita forced Padma to trade his son's life for his own, and Fernando was taken by the werewolves and was tortured and killed by Sylvie, as revenge for the rape. She sometimes handles some of his bones.

Appearances: Burnt Offerings

==== Fredo ====
Fredo is a wererat and works security at the Circus of the Damned. He is almost 6 feet, slender, with black hair and dark eyes. Although he carries a gun, his favorite weapons are knives. In Bullet we find out that Fredo is teaching a short-blade class to Anita and all the bodyguards at the Circus. He is the uncle of God (Godofredo) which leads to wonder of if Fredo's name is short for the same, the question earning a flat look and no answer. Fredo is slender, not that tall, and holed down to lanky muscle like the slender blades he favors.

Appearances: Cerulean Sins, Incubus Dreams, Danse Macabre, The Harlequin, Bullet

==== God ====
Full name is Godofredo. He is the nephew of Fredo which brings the question if both of them have the same real name. God is inches taller than his uncle, broader, muscular.

==== Igor ====
Former bodyguard for Anita. Covered in tattoos. Killed by a serpentine lycanthrope.

Appearance: Narcissus in Chains

==== Lisandro ====
Lisandro is a wererat and works as security at the Circus of the Damned. He is six feet tall, dark, handsome, with shoulder-length black hair pulled back in a ponytail. Lisandro is married and has two children.

In Bullet, he is one of the wererats that nickname Anita "negra gatita", meaning "black kitten". He sleeps with Anita after the attack on the triumvirates, by the Lover of Death and the Dark Mother, when the ardeur overwhelms them and everyone at the Circus of the Damned. Lisandro, along with Anita, confesses to his wife about them having sex under the influence of the ardeur. Out of respect for his wife, they don't talk about what happened between them sexually, and vow to never let it happen again.

Appearances: Incubus Dreams, Danse Macabre, The Harlequin, Bullet, Hit List

==== Lillian ====
Doctor. Frequently patches up shapeshifters in their unofficial infirmary located in the bottom of an apartment building. Physical Description: Mid-fifties with salt and pepper hair cut in a short no nonsense style, dexterous hands.

First appearance: Guilty Pleasures.

==== Louis Fane ====
Louis is about 5'6", with black hair and eyes, and is known as "Louie" to his friends. A biology professor at Wash U, Louie is Richard's best friend, and has been dating Ronnie, Anita's best friend. He asked Ronnie to marry him but she turned him down because she didn't feel ready to be married nor did she share Louie's desire to have kids.

Appearances: Guilty Pleasures, The Lunatic Cafe, The Killing Dance, Burnt Offerings, Incubus Dreams, The Harlequin.

==== Rafael ====
He is the Rat King and one of Anita's friends. Rafael is strongly Mexican, and is described as "tall, dark and handsome" (Lunatic Cafe) with a stern face and sensual lips. He has a crown branded into his forearm to mark him as Rat King and his clan is called the Dark Crown Clan. He and Nikolaos were in conflict over control of the city's rats and wererats until Anita killed her. Anita saved his life so he offers her bodyguards or any other help when she needs them. Rafael also has treaties with Richard and Jean-Claude. He has an ex-wife who moved with his child to another state to get away from him because of what he is. He has visitation rights.

He offers himself up as Anita's Pomme de Sang in The Harlequin in order to have a better connection with Anita and Jean-Claude and therefore be more protected against outside forces.

Appearances: Guilty Pleasures, The Lunatic Cafe, Burnt Offerings, Narcissus in Chains, The Harlequin.

=== Werehyenas ===
==== Ajax ====
Blond werehyena who acts as bodyguard to Narcissus. Lover of Ulysses. Had his arms and legs cut off and the stumps burned by Chimera so that he could not heal the damage.

First Appearance: Narcissus in Chains.

==== Bacchus ====
A werehyena with dark, curly hair and eyes of a strange shade of gold. Lover of Dionysus. Bacchus was shot and badly wounded by Anita during a confrontation at the Narcissus in Chains club. He recovered from his injuries and told Anita about the werehyenas' situation regarding Narcissus and Chimera.

First Appearance: Narcissus in Chains.

==== Dionysus ====
Lover of Bacchus, his tongue was cut out and presented to his lover by Chimera.

First Appearance: Narcissus in Chains.

==== Ixion ====
A relatively new werehyena who is still adjusting to his new name (given to him by Narcissus), Ixion is one of the werehyenas who bodyguard Anita as a result of her alliance with Narcissus.

First Appearance: Danse Macabre.

==== Narcissus ====
Owner of the club, Narcissus in Chains (a BDSM club), and leader of the city's werehyena population. An effeminate hermaphrodite, he became pregnant following his relationship with Chimera. Narcissus is into both sides of BDSM and Asher topped him after Narcissus met with the triumvirate of Anita, Jean-Claude, and Richard. Under the old ruling of Raina and Marcus, Narcissus was given favors and not allowed to let his hyena population grow over 50 members. Once Richard became Ulfric, the old deals were voided and Narcissus decided he wanted to be able to make some of the decisions for the lycanthrope population of St. Louis versus having the decisions made for him including growing his ranks of werehyenas to greater than 400 members.

First Appearance: Narcissus in Chains, Bullet (mentioned)

==== Remus ====
Described by Anita as having a face that looked as if it had been broken in the past, Remus is one of the werehyenas who bodyguard Anita as a result of her alliance with Narcissus.

First Appearance: Danse Macabre.

==== Ulysses ====
Dark-haired werehyena who acts as bodyguard to Narcissus. Lover of Ajax.

First Appearance: Narcissus in Chains.

=== Werelions ===
==== Haven ====
Haven is a werelion brought with Augustine from Chicago as a pomme de sang candidate for Anita, and to try to take over the local pride. He is pale, with short, spiky blue hair, dyed so that many hues of blue are present, all mixed together, just like real hair. His eyes are also a pale blue. Anita calls him Cookie (in reference to Cookie Monster). He has tattoos of Bert and Ernie from Sesame Street, and has implied that he has more.

Haven has been sent back to Chicago by the beginning of The Harlequin as Anita is attempting to preserve the local pride. However, when the local were-lions refuse to help her (unlike the other members of the Lycanthrope Coalition), Haven returns. As a result, he takes over the local pride. Others claim he is in love with Anita as he finds himself wanting to be better than he is in order not to disappoint her.

Haven has issues with masculine dominance which is one of the reasons that Anita keeps her distance from him. In Bullet, this reaches a climax where her tries to dominate her and violently attacks Noel and other possible Lions-to-call for Anita. At the end of the book Bullet he is Killed by Anita for trying to kill Nathaniel Graison but instead killing the werelion Noel.

Appearances: Danse Macabre, The Harlequin, Bullet

==== Joseph ====
Rex of the St. Louis pride. In his pride, there is a male coalition; they rule the pride together.

In Narcissus in Chains, it is mentioned he has a mate (named Amber) who is pregnant and on strict bed-rest. They've tried three other times to have a child, but generally the change from human to animal form is too stressful for the body to carry a child to term.

In The Harlequin, Joseph, his wife (named Julia), and his brother disappear (it is alluded that they are killed by Haven; they took Haven's advice and run from the town) after Joseph is condemned by Anita and her companions for his unwillingness to feed her ardeur sexually or otherwise, his pride's self-imposed "weakness," and his lack of appeal to her inner lioness.

Appearances: Narcissus in Chains, Danse Macabre, The Harlequin.

==== Justin ====
Joseph's brother. He is part of Joseph's male coalition; they ruled the pride together.

Appearances: Danse Macabre.

==== Jacob Leon ====
Alpha werelion, Rex of his pride and professional mercenary, his lion is attracted to Anita's lioness. He is afraid that he can deny Anita nothing if she asks something of him.

Appearances: Flirt, Bullet

==== Nicky ====
Nicky is a one-eyed werelion sent to kidnap Anita Blake who ends up feeding the ardeur and being owned by it becoming Anita's "Bride". Later on Nicky is taken home with Nathaniel, Micah, and Anita because Anita purposely possessed him with the ardeur in order to save herself and her other lovers from an unhappy person who she interviewed at Animators, Inc. Nicky is also a very dominant werelion who Anita hopes will be her lion to call instead of Haven. In Kiss the Dead, it's stated that he is the Rex of the St. Louis Pride. Also in Kiss the Dead, Anita has her first experience nearly killing a lover with the Ardeur with Nicky.

Anita finally falls in love with Nicky and they become closer in later books. Nicky begins to have a calming effect. He doesn’t understand emotions well and Anita acts as his conscience. He imitates behavior he learns from others as well as emotional reactions. He has this overwhelming desire to ensure Anita’s happiness. Anita can not “see” his thoughts or feelings.

Appearances: Flirt, Bullet, Kiss the Dead, Affliction

==== Noel ====
A werelion in the St. Louis pride, sent with Travis by Joseph to become Anita's new animals to call before Anita marked Haven, making way for a hostile takeover of the St. Louis werelion pride. He was rejected on the basis of being too submissive and weak as Anita's ardeur was seeking more powerful prey. He was killed in the process of saving Nathaniel from being shot by Haven. He was on his way to getting a doctorate in literature

Appearances: Danse Macabre, Bullet

==== Pierce ====
Werelion brought with Augustine from Chicago as a pomme de sang candidate for Anita, and to try to take over the local pride. A brunette, with hair that looks like it might curl, but it's cut too short to have a chance. The swell of his shoulders shows that he lifts weights as more than a casual hobby.

First Appearance: Danse Macabre.

==== Travis ====
A werelion in the St. Louis pride, sent with Noel to become Anita's new animal to call before Anita was marked by Haven. He is a college student and not dominant enough to call Anita's beast.

Appearances: Danse Macabre, Bullet

==== Kelly Reeder ====
A werelion new to the St. Louis pride, recruited by Augustine and Haven. She previously belonged to a pride run by women, and believes that a pride should be like family. She is short, slender, muscular, and blond. She is a fighter who uses both physical attacks and weapons. Standing up with Anita she helped overthrow Haven.

First Appearance: Bullet.

==== Rosamond ====
Another lion newly recruited to the St. Louis pride by Haven and Augustine. She's close to six feet tall with short brown hair. She is not a fighter and was knocked out by Haven early in the fight. Although she is not a fighter, she still had the courage to stand against Haven along with Anita and Kelly.

First Appearance: Bullet.

=== Weretigers ===
==== Adam ====
A golden weretiger residing in Saint Louis, the character is depicted as a skilled lawyer but a comparatively weak combatant.

Appearance: Dead Ice.

==== Ava ====
Ava had red hair, and pale skin with freckles. Her eyes were brown and human looking. Plain weretiger, contaminated by white weretiger; made Bibiana social secretary as a satisfaction; betrayed Max and Bibiana to Vittorio; killed by Cannibal.

Appearance: Skin Trade.

==== Ben ====
Red tiger clan bodyguard.

Appearance: Hit List.

Cynric Only pureblood blue weretiger. Is an active member of Anita's home life with Nathaniel, Nicky, and Micah. Anita has always had trepidation with the young tiger's feelings for herself, feeling that he is too young and hasn't lived. She feels that their metaphysical ties cause him to stay, when he should find another to give him more attention.

Also listed below. Appearance: Skin Trade, Bullet, Kiss The Dead, Dead Ice, Crimson Death

==== Martin Bendez ====
White weretiger who had an ex-wife who was charging him with abuse. For this reason he attacked police when they put surveillance on him, killed several policemen and finally was killed.

Appearance: Skin Trade.

==== Bibiana ====
The white tiger queen of the Las Vegas weretigers, she is often addressed as Chang-Bibiana and is the wife of Max, vampire Master of the City. Bibiana has a son by Max named Victor. Bibiana appears to have vampire-like powers of influence. She wants Anita to be mated with her son Victor, however Anita is already bound to Jean-Claude.

Appearances: Skin Trade, Bullet.

==== Victor ====
Victor Belleci, the son of the Master of the City Las Vegas, Maximillian, and his wife Bibiana, a white tiger clan queen, he is an unmated Tiger King, the first in centuries. His Queen Mother wants Victor to marry Anita Blake and to start a new clan of pure blood white weretigers.

Appearances: Skin Trade, Bullet.

==== Pride ====
Pride Christensen is another golden tiger brought by Jake to Anita for protection. Anita seems to prefer Devil.

Appearances: Bullet, Kiss the Dead, Affliction, Crimson Death.

==== Christine ====
A blonde weretiger, Christine is a lycanthrope who belongs to no social group (neither wolf pack, nor leopard pard, nor lion pride). Gabriel embarrassed her by reciting the poem "Tyger, Tyger" at a lycanthrope meeting. She is a rarity, since tiger-based lycanthropy is hard to contract. In The Harlequin it is revealed that she fled to St. Louis in order to avoid an arranged marriage. (The weretiger culture is dominated by five clans who maintain the bloodlines and dislike weretigers who are not born into the condition.)

Appearances: The Lunatic Cafe, The Killing Dance, Narcissus in Chains, The Harlequin.

==== Paula Chu ====
White weretiger, 5'5" – 5'6", works in "Trixie", live-in girlfriend of Martin Bendez.

Appearance: Skin Trade.

==== Crispin ====
A white weretiger from Las Vegas. He is an adult male in his group, so he takes the beast of the pregnant female weretigers so that they do not lose their babies during pregnancy; this is the same method that Anita has been using to avoid turning into a wereanimal. There was a chance he made Anita pregnant, and if he had he said that he would marry her and take her back to Las Vegas. He was "rolled" by Anita and the ardeur when Marmee Noir took away Anita's self-control. He is twenty-one and Anita's tiger to call. After Anita's visit to Vegas, she takes him with her to St.-Louis.

Appearances: Blood Noir, Skin Trade, Bullet, Dead Ice.

==== Cynric ====
A blue weretiger, cobalt blue with black stripes. Cynric is rolled by Anita during an ardeur-fueled orgy caused by Vittorio. Anita is concerned about the fact that Cynric was 16. In Vegas, he was legal and Bibina agreed to it, but he is still very young. He too, was very weak to the call of Anita's tiger, which causes him to follow around like a puppy. He stays in St. Louis since he is believed to be the only blue tiger in existence. He'll finish his senior year with there. He lives with Anita in Kiss the Dead, having become her lover but Anita still struggles with this due to his age. He also is involved with Lycanthrope Sports, mostly Football and there is mention of lycanthrope leagues.

His chosen nickname "Sin" is not to Anita nor to Jean-Claude liking.

In Crimson Death Sin comes into his powers over earth.

Appearances: Skin Trade, Bullet, Hit List (mentioned), Kiss the Dead, Dead Ice, Crimson Death.

==== Deveroux ====
Good Angel Deveroux is Mephistopheles' twin sister. She resents being called to serve new Master of Tigers and losing her life in big world. Works as assistant manager in Danse Macabre.

Appearances: Dead Ice, Crimson Death.

==== Mephistopheles ====
Mephistopheles Devlin Devereux – a golden tiger that Anita makes hers. He is brought to Anita by Jake in order to protect the golden tigers, long hidden from the Mother of Darkness. Jake and his master also want to discover whether Anita and Jean-Claude are Masters of Tigers. Mephistopheles' nickname is Devil, paired to his twin sister's Angel.

Dev falls in love with Asher. But Asher leaves him for Kane, who has more issues than Asher.

Appearances: Bullet, Kiss the Dead, Affliction, Dead Ice, Crimson Death.

==== Donny ====
Red tiger clan guard, tall and perfectly bald. He had eyes the color of orange fire and six-foot frame.

Appearance: Hit List.

==== Envy ====
A female golden tiger brought by Jake to the Circus. 5'11", shoulder-lendgth blond hair, blue eyes. Jean-Claude and Richard have sex with her and she becomes one of the protected tigers in the Circus.

Appearances: Bullet, Jason.

==== Ethan ====
Ethan Flynn is a weretiger who can assume four different forms: red, white, blue, and gold. Ethan didn't know he possessed the gold tiger form until Anita smelled it on him. Because of the multitude of colors he carries, no female tiger will sleep with him (even after he received a vasectomy) because they didn't want their children to be "unpure". Ethan was a guard with the same red clan to which Alex Pinn belonged before he went to St. Louis with Anita. Here, Ethan is a guard.

Appearances: Hit List, Affliction, Crimson Death.

==== Fortune ====
Sofie Fortunada, Fortune is female blue pureblood weretiger mentioned in Bullet, an animal to call of Harlequin Echo. Short, pale blue hair, blue-gray tiger eyes in human face, blue eyelashes. She was five-ten.

Fortune eventually ask for a chance to fill Anita’s and Jean-Claude’s bed.

Appearances: Dead Ice, Crimson Death.

==== George ====
Red weretiger, Harlequin spy planted to Seattle red tiger clan. Died when his master was decapitated by Anita order.

Appearance: Hit List.

==== Gideon ====
A handsome plain weretiger with blonde-brown hair, his eyes are yellow-and-orange. His voice sounds like he is growling. He is a somewhat reluctant servant and animal to call of Padma, the Master of Beasts. He is bound to him in a triumvirate somewhat like that of Anita, Jean-Claude and Richard Zeeman.

Appearance: Burnt Offerings, Bullet.

==== Hunter ====
A red tiger that became victim of the ardeur-fueled orgy which Vittorio had provoked.

Appearances: Skin Trade, Bullet.

==== Jade ====
Yiyú, also known as Black Jade, is the former tiger to call of one of the Harlequin. She is delicate, petite, and Asian with long straight, shining black hair. She can fit under Anita's arm like Anita can fit under most of her boyfriends' arms. Yiyú had been severely abused by her former master, who used pain to control her. Yiyú comes to St. Louis during the events of Bullet to spy for her master. She pretended to be an attack survivor. Anita discovered that she is a black tiger and tried "tame" her, but her master intervened and tried to control both her and Anita. Anita with the help of Domino succeeds in breaking the connection between Yiyú and her master, and becomes her new master.

She remains in St. Louis with Anita, and although she can fight and is fearsomely good, the centuries of abuse have left her with a victim's mentality.

She has become one of Anita's lovers and makes Anita "heteroflexible" rather than heterosexual.

Anita ends things with Jade after discovering Jade is too damaged to consider developing any kind of healthy relationship with Anita’s other lovers. Jade does seem to allow a few men in her life eventually. But won’t work on her issues.

Appearances: Bullet, Kiss the Dead, Jason.

==== Jared ====
A red weretiger with pale red hair sent to Anita.

Appearance: Bullet.

==== Julia ====
Female white weretiger with long pale curls, mostly white, but with edges of pale golden brown here and there, and eyes were a blue so pale they were gray.

Appearance: Bullet.

==== Lacey ====
Female red weretiger sent together with her twin brother and Hunter, and Jared to Anita.

Appearance: Bullet.

==== Gregory Minns ====
White weretiger, enforcer for Las Vegas white tiger clan.

Appearance: Skin Trade.

==== Alex Pinn ====
A red weretiger with black stripes. Li Da of the Red clan, 5'10", his hair was the deep red of his tiger fur, his eyes yellow-gold with their rim of orange red. He is a reporter, a prized one, and does not live with other weretigers. His mother is Cho Chun, the queen of their clan, which he left. He, like Crispin, said that if he made Anita pregnant, that he would marry her and together they would go back to the group that he left. He was "rolled" just like Crispin. Both tigers, Anita and Jason only remember pieces of what happened over the two days the ardeur had control over them.

Appearances: Blood Noir, Hit List.

==== Reba ====
Female red weretiger. Daughter of queen Cho Chun, sister to Alex Pinn.

Appearance: Bullet.

==== Roderick ====
Rick, white weretiger, main bodyguard of Chang Bibiana.

Appearance: Skin Trade.

==== Domino ====
Domino Santana, a weretiger, with black and white hair in human form. Domino can assume a black tiger form or a white tiger form, but since encountering Anita, his black tiger appears to be dominant. He was rolled by Anita's ardeur when Vittorio took away her control. She takes him with her back to St. Louis. Together with Ethan enabled Anita to eat Marmee Noir in Hit List, providing with the full rainbow of tigers. Dies in Crimson Death.

He is under consideration to commit to Nathaniel, Anita, Micah, and several others including Jean-Claude. Anita is reluctant to agree.

Appearances: Skin Trade, Bullet, Hit List, Kiss the Dead, Affliction, Jason, Dead Ice, Crimson Death.

==== Sebastian ====
Known as Hong, he has been the animal to call of Vittorio for centuries. Anita broke his tie to him during an ardeur-fueled orgy. He is one of the entertainers in Vegas. After their adventure, he goes off on his own, not wanting to be owned by anyone.

Appearance: Skin Trade.

==== Soledad ====
A young woman who supposedly hid with the wererats to prevent being married to a family of weretigers. It was revealed that she was the animal to call of a vampire Harlequin in The Harlequin and had incredible healing abilities. She tried to kill Anita and killed a young wererat named Cisco. Her tiger form was described as being yellow with white stripes, which afterwards is one of the weretiger forms that Anita carries within her. It is falsely implied that she was the last surviving member of the Golden Tiger Clan, the rulers of all weretiger clans in the past. Beheaded by Anita, while Olaf burned her and cut out her heart.

Appearance: The Harlequin.

==== Thorn ====
Golden weretiger with temper.

Appearances: Bullet, Kiss the Dead, Dead Ice.

==== Topaz ====
Golden male weretiger, animal to call of a Harlequin.

Appearance: Bullet.

=== Swanmanes ===
==== Donovan Reece ====
Tall at about six feet, pale milk-and-cream complexion, and handsome in a preppy, clean-cut sort of way. Donovan Reece is the Swan King of every swanmane in the U.S. Reece states that he is the first Swan King in a century, and that he has been destined from birth to that position, since he has a birthmark in the shape of a swan. He has been groomed for this position since he was young, though he doesn't want it. As part of the coalition he is allies with Anita and other were groups. As an inborn politician and Swan King he has to travel from swan group to swan group, looking in on them, settling problems. He's been talking about the coalition to other cities. Normally a swan queen and king are born in the same generation, but without a swan queen he has to do twice the work. Anita reacts to him, and she feeds from his entire swanmane population in The Harlequin.

Appearances: Narcissus in Chains, The Harlequin

==== Kaspar Gunderson ====
Tall and pale, with downy feathers in place of hair, Gunderson was a proud and cruel European prince and hunter. Centuries ago, he was cursed by a witch to transform into a swan in the hope that he would learn kindness. Instead, Gunderson walked the Earth, becoming increasingly more bitter. One of the few shapeshifters who transformed into prey rather than a predator, Gunderson had an uneasy relationship with most other shapeshifters. Although he was a shapeshifter, he wasn't a lycanthrope and could transform from a human to a swan and back repeatedly without a period of unconsciousness. Gunderson's curse prevented him from aging, and he claimed that he could not be killed, even with silver. However, he is eventually killed by Edward, who gives his feathered skin (from his swan form) to Anita as a gift along with a note saying he had found a witch who was able to remove Gunderson's curse. It is alluded to that he is the basis of the main character of Swan Lake.

Appearance: The Lunatic Cafe.

=== Werejaguars ===
==== Cesar ====
A werejaguar from New Mexico, acted as a "sacrifice" for a lycanthrope Aztec stage show run by Itzpapalotl. He experienced Anita's "beast" and convinced most who observed that she was a were.

Appearances: Obsidian Butterfly.

==== Seth ====
A werejaguar from New Mexico, who serves Itzpapalotl, cutting himself as "offerings" to his mistress and her servants, allowing them to drink from the bleeding wounds until they healed. He allows Itzpapalotl to use her Human Servant to suck the life force out of his body, both turning him into a living mummified corpse and feeding all of her vampires.

Appearances: Obsidian Butterfly.

== Other supernatural groups ==
=== Fey ===
==== Magnus Bouvier ====
Beautiful, with waist length, chestnut colored hair and sea green eyes, Magnus was a powerful fey-human crossbreed, with strong powers of glamour and touch clairvoyance and preternatural speed and strength. Much of his power, however, came from his secret feeding on the blood of Rawhead and Bloody Bones. He was ultimately killed when Ellie, animated and controlled by Anita like a zombie, burned to death in the sunlight while holding his waist.

Appearances: Bloody Bones.

==== Dorcas Bouvier ====
Magnus's sister, Dorcas, was cursed, together with Magnus, to remain near their family land and ensure that Rawhead and Bloody Bones remained restrained. Like Magnus, she had chestnut hair and sea green eyes. Unlike Magnus, Dorrie typically used her glamour to hide her startling beauty. With the destruction of Bloody Bones, she was free to take her children and start a new life.

Appearances: Bloody Bones.

==== Rawhead and Bloody Bones ====
Apparently based on the folk legend of the same name, Rawhead and Bloody Bones was a fey approximately ten feet tall with a bloody, pulsing head. A children's [Bogeyman"], Bloody Bones was a true immortal and lived to punish guilty children. He was brought to the U.S.A. by Magnus and Dorcas's ancestor who, in turn, used Rawhead's blood to make a potion which increased his fey power. After he escaped, he was confined to the ground by the combined power of the available Indian, fey, and Christian magic and remained there until Magnus began using his blood, centuries later.

Ultimately, Seraphina and Raymond Stirling were able to trick Anita into freeing Bloody Bones. However, while Magnus was drawing power from him, Bloody Bones was mortal, and Anita was able to kill him.

Appearances: Bloody Bones.

=== Touch Clairvoyants ===
==== Evans ====
Anita goes to visit touch-clairvoyant Evans when she needs help for a case. Scared and upset, Evans no longer wants to help the police solve cases due to the mental scars received whenever he touches physical evidence connected to a murder. Evans helps Anita when she pressures him to aid in rescuing a small child but then orders her out. Later, Anita states Evans tried to cut off his hands off (but didn't) and is now back in business.

Appearances: The Laughing Corpse, Incubus Dreams.

=== Mer ===
==== Thea ====
Leucothea a.k.a. Thea is the last living siren, and wife of Samuel, Master of the City of Cape Cod. (For mythical allusions, see Leucothea). She and Samuel have three sons (presumably half-human, half-mer): Sampson, the eldest (70 years old with the appearance of a 20-ish young man), and 17-year-old twins Thomas and Cristos.

Appearances: Danse Macabre.

==== Perdy ====
One of Thea's mermaids, Perdita a.k.a. Perdy came to St. Louis with Samuel and Thea. Jason "evaluated" her suitability for joining Jean-Claude's group, and the two are dating as of The Harlequin. She is spying on Thea and Samuel's son Sampson to ensure he attempts to develop his potential powers as a siren with Anita's assistance.

Appearances (mentioned only): Danse Macabre, The Harlequin, Blood Noir

== Other supporting characters ==
=== Other human characters ===
==== Anthony Dietrich ====
Twins Stephen and Gregory's father, Mr. Dietrich molested and pimped out his children at a young age and is one of the great traumas in their lives. He reappeared in St. Louis during the events of Cerulean Sins and has been trying to see his children, ignoring their restraining order against him, although he has not yet revealed the reason for his attempted contact.

Appearances: Mentioned in Cerulean Sins, appears in Incubus Dreams

==== Bradford ====
Special Agent Bradley Bradford is part of the Special Research Section, essentially the FBI's version of RPIT. He works with Anita in Branson, Missouri, and in Albuquerque, New Mexico, and thinks very highly of her. In pulling her file to consider her for possible FBI work, Bradford inadvertently gets Anita tapped as a potential "Spook" – dangerous types hired by the American government for covert work.

==== Bernardo Spotted Horse ====
Bodyguard, mercenary and assassin, associate to Edward. He has long hair which he uses to conceal a knife.

Appearances: Obsidian Butterfly, Skin Trade, Hit List.

==== Burchard ====
Nikolaos's human servant, Burchard was 603 years old. He was bald, skilled with weapons, and carried himself like a soldier. Anita killed Burchard in Guilty Pleasures by stabbing him in the back and slitting his throat.

Appearance: Guilty Pleasures

==== Catherine Maison-Gillette ====
One of Anita's friends, Catherine serves mainly as a plot point in the first few novels, as Anita is forced to attend or prepare for her bachelorette party, wedding, Halloween party, etc. She is a criminal attorney at the same firm as Monica Vespucci.

Appearances: Guilty Pleasures, The Killing Dance, Blue Moon; mentioned in The Laughing Corpse and Circus of the Damned.

==== Charlotte Zeeman ====
Richard's mother, a small blonde woman who looks younger than she actually is. She is very strong and commanding, despite her size, and all the Zeeman men love, adore, and fear her. She is now missing a finger, which Anita very much avenged, cutting off most of the fingers of the culprit with the help of some shape-shifter friends for information before putting a round in his head.

First appearance: Blue Moon

==== Daniel Zeeman ====
One of Richard's brothers, a few years younger than Richard and adorably cute. He has the nearly same hair as Richard, only slightly darker. Other physical features include a nose that didn't quite heal right from being broken, naturally tan skin, high cheekbones, brown eyes, and a dimple in his chin. During the events of Blue Moon Daniel and his mother were kidnapped and brutalized by thugs attempting to blackmail Anita into leaving town. Daniel was for a long time the only member of Richard's family to know that Richard is a werewolf.

First appearance: Blue Moon, mentioned in The Killing Dance

==== Dominga Salvador ====
Dominga Salvador a.k.a. The Señora is an evil voodoo or vaudun priestess, who Anita says is the most powerful one she has ever met, maybe the most powerful one in North America. Dominga was once also Manny's lover and leader, for her he did many things he probably regrets now. She is in her early sixties, has pure white hair and black eyes. She found a way to make a perfect looking zombie that will not rot, by simply capturing the soul before it moves on, calling up the zombie, and putting the soul back inside the dead body. She hopes that Anita will join her, learn from her, but Anita refuses. She vanished while under investigation for crimes which would carry an automatic death penalty; the police suspect Anita of having killed Salvador, but have no evidence. The truth is that Anita did kill Salvador with a group of zombies raised in a forced attempt to bring back an ancestor of Harold Gaynor.

Appearance: The Laughing Corpse

==== Edward ====
A human assassin/bounty hunter that chose to hunt supernatural targets as "normal" humans were too easy. Anita and Edward have a strange relationship. Neither one is attracted to each other, but both consider each other a friend to be trusted. Since his profession is an elite assassin, he has little connection to anybody. Those that are known besides Anita include: Olaf, Van Cleef, and Bernardo Spotted Horse. His alter ego, Theodore "Ted" Forrester, a registered bounty-hunter, vampire hunter and U.S. Marshal, is currently engaged to Donna Parnell. She lives in Santa Fe and she has two children, Becca and Peter Parnell (ages 6 and 14 in OB). Edward considers Peter his son.

Edward's past is shrouded in mystery; however, we do know that he once worked and was trained by a man named Van Cleef, with the suggestion of a military connection. He is recognized by others who trained under Van Cleef who call him "The Undertaker", a name he apparently acquired due to having the highest kill count of any of Van Cleef's trainees. Edward tells Anita that he was allowed to leave Van Cleef's troop on the condition that he never spoke about it; if he does, they will find him and kill him, a threat that he clearly takes seriously.

According to Anita's account in Guilty Pleasures, approximately two years before the start of the series, Edward and Anita collaborated in the hunt for Valentine and his nest of vampires. Ultimately, Edward used a flamethrower, burning a house down around himself and Anita. This story is told in a two-issue comic book, The First Death.

Edward is a sociopath alongside Anita. Sociopathy plays a big part in the series. Between Anita and Edward's relationships, they often talk about how effortlessly they can kill, without feeling anything, without caring for those they kill. Another topic that they openly discuss is "who would be better". Edward says that his greatest fantasy is to go against Anita, and see who is better. Edward claims to have dreamed about it. Anita can see the excitement in his eyes and believes him. Edward acts like he doesn't really care about anything, but in Obsidian Butterfly he shoots through a gang of baddies to save his girlfriend Donna's children, Becca and Peter. "I always thought Edward killed emotionless, his eyes cold," Anita said, in Obsidian Butterfly. "But when I looked into his baby blues, they were filled with fire. I had always thought Edward was scariest at his most cold. I was wrong. Edward the family man was downright terrifying." Edward confesses to Olaf that Anita is his soul mate because they are essentially the same person trapped in two bodies.

Edward leads a double life; Edward as an assassin is the true Edward (as far as we know). He has an alias, his only legal identity (as far as we know) called Ted Forrester. Ted is a licensed bounty hunter, and "good ol' boy" operating out of Santa Fe; like Anita, he becomes "grandfathered" in as a Federal Marshall. Ted is engaged to a widow, Donna Parnell, with two kids, Peter and Becca (aged 14 and 6 in Obsidian Butterfly), not to mention the two Maltese Peeka and Boo. He appears to have a close relationship with them, and Anita almost thinks that Edward could be in love. However, in The Harlequin, it is clear that Donna and Becca do not know "Edward", only "Ted". Anita is surprised to learn that Peter knows "Edward" – and wants to follow in Edward's and Anita's footsteps.

In Skin Trade, Edward under the guise of Ted Forrester comes to Las Vegas to help Anita hunt for the vampire serial killer Vittorio. He brings with him Olaf and Bernardo. Edward acts a little like a boyfriend to Anita to keep Olaf at bay, since no one else that Anita dates or loves is dominant enough. Yet Anita says she could never feed off Edward in any way because it would be like doing a family member. Edward admits to have been contacted as Death to take out the Mother of Darkness and he turned down the contract. The price was right, but he admits that he has commitments now; his alter ego Ted has people who love him and Edward would prefer to return home to them than to fight something potentially more dangerous than himself.

Among the vampire community he is known as "Death". Among the Secret Service he is known as "the Undertaker".

Appearances: Guilty Pleasures, Circus of the Damned, The Lunatic Cafe, The Killing Dance, Obsidian Butterfly, Narcissus in Chains (mentioned), The Harlequin, Skin Trade, Hit List, Affliction, Crimson Death (novel)

==== Harley ====
Psychotic but loyal back-up for Edward, Harley appears in The Killing Dance. Anita realizes he sees the world in a totally different way and only listens to people he can "see". After a metaphysical change in Anita, Harley no longer recognizes her (seeing "only monsters") when Edward becomes disabled and Harley begins to kill everything he can see, including Anita, who regrettably kills him first. It is his death that makes Anita owe Edward a favor (which he calls in in Obsidian Butterfly).

==== Harold Gaynor ====
Harold is one of many people who seek to use Anita's powers for their own ends. A self-made multimillionaire with organized crime connections and the product of a nonmarital relationship, Gaynor is obsessed with revenge on a family that did not admit he was a member, and wants Anita to raise one of his ancestors in order to find the location of a family treasure. He uses a wheelchair, and made a practice of dating handicapped women, such as Wheelchair Wanda. Anita ultimately orders him torn apart by zombies.

Appearance: The Laughing Corpse

==== Katie Zerbrowski ====
Zerbrowski's wife. Anita has often wondered how or why Katie married Zerbrowski in the first place. Anita also wonders how Katie allows Zerbrowski to leave the house looking so messy when she is so neat.

First appearance: The Lunatic Cafe (First mentioned in Guilty Pleasures)

==== Luther ====
Human bartender for Dead Dave, Luther works the day shift and frequently acts as Anita's informant on Dave's behalf. Luther is a grey-haired, very dark-skinned, chain smoker, and Anita describes him as fat, "but a solid fat like a kind of muscle".

Appearances: Guilty Pleasures, The Laughing Corpse.

==== Marianne ====
The vargamor (a human wise-woman to the pack, always remains neutral in conflicts) for Verne's clan in Tennessee, sort of half pack witch, half pack therapist. She helps Anita with some of the magical issues that Anita faces, such as learning how to control the munin (spirits of pack members who have died but remain alive in "pack memory"). Marianne is around 50ish in age and has white-blonde hair, and a mechanical heart valve. Anita has called her a few times for help and received tarot readings instead, which are eerily accurate. She even called Anita once to give her a message from God. (Anita described this as He couldn't speak to you, so He left a message on your machine)

First appearance: Blue Moon, Obsidian Butterfly (mentioned)

==== Monica Vespucci ====
Vespucci is a lawyer at Anita's friend Catherine's law firm, and a vampire aficionado. She is one of the bridesmaids at Catherine's wedding. In Guilty Pleasures, Vespucci is part of the plot to blackmail Anita into solving a series of vampire murders. Her part was to lure Catherine there so Valentine could bite her and use her as a hostage if Anita refused to co-operate. Later, Vespucci marries Robert. After Robert is killed, Jean Claude promises that Monica and their child would "want for nothing." Anita has never forgiven her for betraying a friend (Catherine) to the vampires but is staying her hand for the child's sake as long as Monica behaves herself. Monica hates Anita for having everything from the vampires she desires for herself, along with not sharing her view of vampires being higher beings than humans (thus rationalizing away any guilt she felt for what she did to Catherine,) but won't do anything as it would extremely upset the master of the vampires (Jean Claude.) The child seems to be growing normally so far but gives Anita the willies for some reason, mainly when he acts in an odd way. However, she still adores him and he stays at the house with her and Nathaniel when Monica is out of town. Whether he is a typical dhampir or a human with vampire traits is unknown so far. Partly because its extremely rare for vampires to sire and successfully raise children, (it's suspected that Robert was able to sire a child despite being over a hundred years old due to frequent use of a hot tub livening up his sperm.)

Appearances: Guilty Pleasures, The Killing Dance, Bullet.

==== Olaf ====
Otto Jefferies a.k.a. Olaf is an assassin, sadist and convicted rapist, associate to Edward. A serial killer with a physique and M.O./victim profile similar to Edmund Kemper, he has been known to skin victims alive, which is why Edward requested his assistance in Obsidian Butterfly, where similar crimes had been committed. He thinks all women are beneath him, but when he saw how savagely and remorselessly Anita could fight and kill vampires, he came to feel that she was his soul mate, despite—or because of—her nominally fitting his vic profile (petite, dark-haired, female). He has a special "black file" which means he did something for the government, but no one knows what. Edward warned Anita in Obsidian Butterfly that if Olaf comes looking for her, for any reason, to not think or ask questions just kill him. That and she won't owe him another favor if she succeeds so don't hesitate on his account. He reappears in The Harlequin, only to become further smitten with her (it is revealed in that novel that Olaf has turned down more satisfying work abroad to remain in the U.S., training operatives, near St. Louis and, presumably, Anita; the government knows at least some of the details of his career as a serial killer but has agreed not to prosecute him so long as he does not continue his activities while on U.S. soil). In Hit List Edward explains that Olaf, still thinking that Anita is his "serial killer girlfriend", is willing to date-date Anita, despite his tendencies. Olaf survives a were-attack and will now become a werelion, but flees the country (with a kidnapped victim) to avoid Anita and her control over weres. Being aware of Nicky's reputation he was horrified to see Nicky's current state and is terrified that Anita might 'unman' him the same way he feels she did to Nicky. Has been deemed a target to hunt down and eliminate on sight by the government and various other organizations as he was just useful and manageable enough (despite his 'hobbies') while human, but deemed too dangerous to exist as a werelion. He appears again in Sucker Punch as Agent Otto Jefferies to assist Anita in a wereleopard murder case.

Even as a human, Olaf was sufficiently sadistic and brutal that Edward was reluctant to describe his crimes in detail to even someone as experienced and jaded as Anita, adding that if fellow bounty hunter Bernardo knew such details, he would never work with Olaf again.

Appearances: Obsidian Butterfly, The Harlequin, Skin Trade and Hit List.

==== Phillip ====
Phillip was a "vampire junkie" and a male stripper at Guilty Pleasures, and was the first in a long line of beautiful but wounded strippers who have looked to Anita for healing and protection. Within this novel, he was killed by Valentine and Aubrey, raised as a zombie, and then re-interred by Anita.

Appearances: Guilty Pleasures

==== Ronnie ====
Veronica "Ronnie" Simms 5'9" blonde and is Anita's best friend and her usual workout partner and confidante. A private investigator on retainer with Animators, Inc. She is not a "shooter" like Anita. Of late their relationship has broken down. Ronnie, once the one to encourage a sexually carefree attitude in Anita, is now monogamous while the initially prudish Anita currently sleeps with several different men a day. This puts a strain on their relationship, since Anita always thought she'd have one man of her own and has been often conflicted with having more than one to love or sleep with. While Ronnie is rather stunned at the realization of only having one real lover for the rest of her life, potentially, after hitting "triple digits" in bed partners before falling for biology professor and wererat Louie Fane.

Appearances: Guilty Pleasures, The Lunatic Cafe, The Laughing Corpse, Circus of the Damned, Burnt Offerings, Cerulean Sins, Narcissus in Chains, Incubus Dreams, Danse Macabre.

==== Winter ====
Built like a circus strongman, Winter was a human employee of Nikolaos. He attempted to kill and nearly killed, Anita, before being slain by her.

Appearances: Guilty Pleasures.

=== Other vampire characters ===
==== Morvoren ====
Morvoren is a pale blond vampire, described as beautiful but terrifying. She is the master vampire who made Damian and rules in Ireland. Morvoren was the ruler of her land when Damian was made and so is well over a thousand years old. She is a night hag and can generate and draw power from fear. Morvoren can walk in daylight, and was able to share this power with Damian and a fellow Viking-turned-vampire, Perrin. However, due to some poisoned words from a jealous acquaintance suggesting that their resistance to sunlight was really due to their own power rather than hers, Morvoren destroyed Perrin by forcing him to stand in sunlight until it eventually overcame his resistance killing him. Those same poisoned words also encouraged her to torture Damien more than usual from then on. Morvoren can project fear over great distances, sometimes enough fear to kill. In some cases, mentioning her name will draw her attention and her fear.

Morvoren was offered Mr Oliver's seat on the Vampire Council, but refused it. In Blue Moon, Damian claims that he and Morvoren were descended from Belle Morte's bloodline. However, in Incubus Dreams, Jean-Claude claims that Damian is not descended from Belle Morte. At a minimum, Morvoren seems likely to be a sourdre de sang in her own right, this would exclude her from being of Belle Morte's line irrespective of whether she was originally sired into it.

The spelling of Morvoren's name has varied over the series. In Cerulean Sins, Musette refers to her as "Morvoren," but in Incubus Dreams, the characters refer to her as "Moroven." Morvoren's true name is Nemhain, so she is presumably related to the mythical figure Morrigan (Irish War Goddess, who in some instances is also known as Nemhain), whose name means "frenzy" or "panic."

Appearances: Crimson Death, mentioned in Blue Moon, Cerulean Sins, appears in spirit in Incubus Dreams.

==== Sabin ====
A master vampire of Belle Morte's line, Sabin was originally blond-haired, blue-eyed, with the perfectly handsome face of a medieval cherub. Like Jean-Claude, Sabin had the ability to seduce or harm with his voice alone, and was able to call wolves. Although Cassandra claimed that Sabin and Jean-Claude shared exactly the same powers, Sabin also displayed some powers that Jean-Claude has not yet revealed, including the ability to draw blood with his voice and the ability to cloak his face in shadow.

Like Jean-Claude, Sabin was a member of a triumvirate with Dominic Dumare and Cassandra. At Cassandra's request, Sabin refrained from feeding on humans, living only on animal blood, until his body began to rot irreversibly. With Sabin holding his rotted form together by sheer preternatural force of will, the three triumvirate members traveled to St. Louis in an attempt to restore Sabin by sacrificing Jean-Claude and his servants. They were unsuccessful, and Anita ultimately killed Sabin.

Appearances: The Killing Dance

==== Samuel ====
The Master of the City of Cape Cod, Samuel helped Jean-Claude escape Europe and Belle Morte's court, via sailing ship, as a favor to Augustine. Samuel is rare among vampires due to his having fathered not only one child but three with his siren wife, Leucothea. Of all animals to call, Samuel can summon the mermaid. He came to St. Louis early at Jean Claude's request.

Appearances: Danse Macabre

==== Augustine ====
The Master of the City of Chicago, "Auggie" to his friends. He came with to St. Louis bringing his human servant Octavius and two lions, Pierce and Haven. At the request of Jean-Claude, he and Samuel arrived at the Circus a day before the other masters arrived, to discuss matters. He is one of Belle Morte's line with the ability to make people love him. As with all powers of Belle Morte's line, it's a double edged sword, as he can only make people love him as deeply as he is willing to love them. He was rolled by Anita, after forcing the ardeur to rise, attempting to make her love him through his ability. Through him, Anita and Jean Claude fed on every person he had brought with him to St. Louis, making every vampire connected to Jean Claude (as well as people connected to him through any metaphysical means) reach a new power plateau. He is old time mob boss, dealing in drugs and other types of illegal activity. He meant to offer Haven and Pierce as candidates for a new Pomme De Sang, but she rejected Pierce because he expressed that he didn't want to be forced into someones bed.

Appearances: Danse Macabre, Bullet

=== Other undead characters ===
==== Zachary ====
Zachary is a former animator who returned from the dead as the leader of a pack of ghouls. He was forced to work under Nikolaos to raise a zombie that witnessed the vampire murders, (which he was committing), and was able to break the zombies mind to prevent being discovered. He was able to remain 'alive' and to maintain a human appearance by sacrificing vampires to charge a magical gris-gris. Zachary was killed when Anita destroyed the enchantment sustaining him (Guilty Pleasures).

Appearance: Guilty Pleasures.

=== Other lycanthrope characters ===
==== Gil ====
A timid werefox, sought out Anita's protection when alpha lycanthropes began disappearing. He is the only werefox in town, and relies on the protection of other lycanthropes, such as werewolves, since he has no skulk of his own.

Appearances: Narcissus in Chains, Incubus Dreams.

==== Melanie ====
A lamia capable of turning her legs into a serpent's tail, Melanie is apparently a true immortal and does not appear to be killable by any means. She has retractable fangs in her mouth and is venomous. Melanie can turn willing men into snake people, her "harem" of potential mates. She first appears as a member of Mr. Oliver's retinue, but ultimately gets a job as a member of Jean-Claude's circus troupe, performing at The Circus of the Damned. Technically not a were but a mythological creature similar to nagas.

Appearances: Circus of the Damned

==== Orlando King ====
Orlando King was one of the country's most famous lycanthrope hunters. After surviving a savage attack, he apparently "softened" his stance regarding shapeshifters and began preaching tolerance. Eventually, Anita learned the true story—after surviving a werewolf attack, King found that he had been infected with werewolf lycanthropy. King decided to kill as many shapeshifters as possible before the next full moon, assuming that if he took sufficiently dangerous missions, he would himself be killed before his first change. Ultimately, however, none of the shapeshifters he fought was able to kill him, and before his first change, King was infected with six different kinds of lycanthropy: werewolf, wereleopard, werelion, werebear, werehyena, and weresnake. King became a panwere, able to shift to any of the six animal forms with which he was infected and developed a multiple personality disorder, with four distinct personalities:

- The primary personality was Orlando King himself, a famous former lycanthrope hunter.
- Chimera, King's secondary personality was the result of King disassociating himself from many of the killings for which he had felt ashamed during his life. (It's easier to kill a shapeshifter in human form but it made him feel like he was killing humans not monsters.) Chimera had control of King's body at times, and also had complete control of King's lion, wolf, hyena, and leopard forms. As Chimera, he took over Micah Callahan's pard and a few other groups and ruled them brutally.
- Coronus: Coronus of the Black Water clan was King's personality in his were-anaconda form, and was a distinct personality. In this form, King was the leader of the Black Water clan, a South American tribe of Anacondas who were present when King shifted for the first time into each of his animal forms and believed he was a god as a result. These weresnakes were notable in that when they died, they did not revert to human form. They were forced into snake-man form by Chimera and were unable to change back.
- Boone: Boone was King's other distinct personality. Boone could manifest not only a werebear form but could also appear in human form as a person who did not resemble King at all. He was originally the leader of a sleuth of werebears, before King made Boone infect him and then killed him.

King considered capturing Anita as his mate when he believed that she was a werewolf/wereleopard panwere but eventually settled for torturing and raping as many people as possible. Anita finally killed him by draining his life energy. King may be survived by a child, as Narcissus was pregnant with his child at the end of Narcissus in Chains. While King sought to 'help' animal groups with rogue members Chimera sought to dominate and torture every animal group he came across. Derived pleasure from raping (or having his thugs rape) women from the groups he assimilated, and if they got pregnant would rape and hurt them even more brutally until they miscarried. Another form of entertainment for him was to force a dominant member to shift through his will (partly power and partly influence as leader?) and then have them try to change back with their own power. Nobody was ever able to change back to human all the way. So the stronger ones had a permanent animal trait on their human forms (Micah's eyes will always be cat's eyes and will never have human eyes again) while the weaker ones are more animal in form with a few human traits (Zeke will always look more wolf than human for the rest of his life.)

Appearances: Narcissus in Chains.
