= Coronium (disambiguation) =

Coronium was a 19th-century proposed chemical element, that turned out to be 13x-ionized iron (Fe^{+13})

Coronium may also refer to:

- Coronium (gastropod), a genus of sea snails
- Coronium (art), an art installation by Vong Phaophanit and Claire Oboussier
- Coronium (horse), a racehorse, an ancestress of Venetian Way

== See also ==
- Coronea
- Coronese or Camaldolese
- Aglaomorpha coronans (A. coronans)
- Coronon
- Coronin
- Coronoid (disambiguation)
- Coronis (disambiguation)
- Coronel (disambiguation)
- Corone (disambiguation)
- Corona (disambiguation)
- Coron (disambiguation)
