= Koronis =

Koronis (Greek κορωνίς "curved") may refer to:

- Koronis family, a family of asteroids
  - 158 Koronis, an asteroid
- Koronis Pharmaceuticals
- Koronis Rift, a 1985 computer game
- Lake Koronis, a lake in Paynesville, Minnesota, U.S.
- Operation Koronis
- Coronis (diacritic) (Ancient Greek: koronis), a mark over vowel letters in Ancient Greek
- Coronis (textual symbol) (Ancient Greek: koronis), a symbol in Ancient Greek papyri

== See also ==
- Coronis (disambiguation)
- Coronus (disambiguation)
- Korinos, a town and a former municipality in Pieria regional unit, Greece
- Koronos, a village on the Greek island of Naxos
- Kronos (disambiguation)
