= Narcissus in Chains =

2001 novel by Laurell K. Hamilton

- 2001 US hardback cover
- Author: Laurell K. Hamilton
- Cover artist: Craig White (US editions)
- Language: English
- Series: Anita Blake: Vampire Hunter
- Genre: Horror, Mystery, Erotic novel
- Publisher: Berkley Books (Berkley edition)
- Publication date: 2001 (Berkley edition)
- Publication place: United States
- Media type: Print (Paperback)
- Pages: 424 pp (Berkley edition)
- ISBN: 0-425-18168-5 (Berkley edition)
- OCLC: 46634256
- Dewey Decimal: 813/.54 21
- LC Class: PS3558.A443357 N37 2001
- Preceded by: Obsidian Butterfly
- Followed by: Cerulean Sins

Narcissus in Chains is the tenth book in the Anita Blake: Vampire Hunter series of horror/mystery/erotica novels by Laurell K. Hamilton.

== Plot ==
Narcissus in Chains takes place shortly after the events of Obsidian Butterfly, and approximately six months after the events of Blue Moon. At the beginning of the novel, Anita Blake has been out of contact with Jean-Claude, Richard, and the vampires and werewolves that follow her two lovers. After the events in the last novel, Anita is determined to renew her connections to Jean-Claude, Richard, and their followers, but she encounters several new problems as a result of "marrying the marks" that Jean-Claude has placed on Richard and herself.

First, Jean-Claude feeds his ardeur, a rare power seen only in vampires of Jean-Claude's bloodline, through Anita. Shortly afterward, Anita develops the power herself. Although this power allows Anita to draw energy from lust, it also requires her to "feed" on this sexual energy every day, sometimes multiple times a day.

Second, in Anita's absence, Damian, a vampire linked to her after she raised him from true death, has become a feral killing machine and has been locked away by Jean-Claude, and Richard has attempted to substitute democracy for the strictly hierarchical nature of the local werewolf pack, threatening to destroy the pack. A new werewolf in town, Jacob seeks to take advantage of this chaos to raise to third in the pack; to become Ulfric, he would need to first take out second-in-command Sylvie, and then Richard himself.

Third, a new alpha wereleopard, Micah has arrived with his pard of wereleopards, and seeks to merge groups with Anita and consequently becomes her Nimir-Raj and mate. Fourth, a new group of shapeshifters has arrived in town, and attempts to capture Nathaniel and several swanmanes. In the fight against those shapeshifters, Gregory accidentally claws Anita, potentially infecting her with wereleopard lycanthropy. Fifth, Anita eventually learns that several of the weaker werespecies in town have had their alpha weres mysteriously disappear.

Anita helps Damian to regain his sanity, assuming her position as Damian's master and rendering him the first "vampire servant" in centuries. She becomes the bolverk for the werewolves, performing the acts too evil for Richard to do them himself, and inspires Richard to reorganize the werewolves' power structure by showing him how close the wereleopard pard has become under her own dominance. Anita learns that the conflict in the shapeshifter world is due to the arrival of Chimera, a panwere who seeks to dominate shapeshifters by finding weak groups and eliminating their alphas. Both Jacob and Micah arrived in town as agents of Chimera, intended to deliver the local werewolves and wereleopards to his control. Micah, however, switched his loyalty to Anita and was nearly killed as a result. In order to save Richard and Micah's lives, Anita uses her powers to draw the life from Chimera and share that energy with them, killing Chimera and making allies of Narcissus and his werehyenas. The ease with which Chimera played the various species against one another inspires Anita to begin forming a coalition of all the shapeshifter species in St. Louis headed by herself, at least for the moment.

The mastery before calls, Anita comes close to reconciling with Richard, but Richard ultimately leaves her after she uses the ardeur to feed on him, declaring that, like Anita herself, he will not allow himself to be used as food. Anita accepts Micah as her lover and Nimir-Raj. Micah, who appears willing to accommodate any desire of Anita's, becomes part of a menage a trois with Jean-Claude, allowing Jean-Claude to feed on him.

In the epilogue, Anita mourns Richard, but explains that she believes that their romantic relationship is finally over. She is no longer the lupa of the Thronos Rokke clan, but has become its bolverk. She is not herself a wereleopard, but her affinity with the leopards apparently means that they are her animal to call as if she were herself a master vampire. Anita and Micah are happily leading their wereleopards, and she, Micah and Jean-Claude are a happy threesome, but, being Anita, she doubts that happiness can last long.

== Characters ==
=== Major characters ===
Narcissus in Chains features the following major characters.

- Anita Blake:
- Jean-Claude:
- Richard:
- Asher:
- Micah:
- Damian:
- Nathaniel:
- Narcissus:

=== Other characters ===
Recurring characters include:

- Dolph: Dolph reveals to Anita in this book that his oldest son (Darrin) is engaged to a vampire. Dolph has never been able to see past vampires and shapeshifters as monsters, so he is rather upset about this prospect. Another issue for him with the vampire daughter-in-law-to-be is that it means Dolph will never be a grandfather, since his youngest son (Paul) is unable and female vampires cannot carry a child to term.
- Zerbrowski:
- Jason:

Non-recurring characters include:

- Chimera

The death toll in Narcissus in Chains includes:

- Chimera
