= Coronus =

Coronus may refer to:

== Mythology ==
- Coronus (Greek mythology), the name attributed to several Greek mythological figures
- Coronus, a deity of the Lusitanian mythology, in the cultural area of Lusitania (in the territory of modern Galicia and Extremadura (Spain) and Portugal)

== Fictional characters ==
- Coronus, a character in the Anita Blake: Vampire Hunter series of novels

== Other ==
- Coronus, a form of unconsolidated limestone
- Argyrosomus coronus, a species of fish in the genus Argyrosomus
- "Coronus strip", see Mono Airport
