= Affliction (novel) =

2013 novel by Laurell K. Hamilton

- Author: Laurell K. Hamilton
- Language: English
- Series: Anita Blake: Vampire Hunter
- Genre: Urban fantasy
- Publisher: Berkley Publishing Group (Hardcover US); Headline (Hardcover UK); Jove (Mass market paperback)
- Publication date: July 2, 2013 (Hardcover, audiobook, e-book); June 3, 2014 (paperback, expected)
- Publication place: United States
- Media type: Print, audiobook, e-book
- Pages: 570 (Hardcover)
- ISBN: 978-0-425-25570-4 (Hardcover); ISBN 978-1-61176-164-1 (audiobook); ISBN 978-0-425-25570-4 (e-book); ISBN 978-0-515-15427-6 (Mass market paperback)
- Preceded by: Kiss the Dead
- Followed by: Jason

Affliction is a 2013 urban fantasy novel by American writer Laurell K. Hamilton, the 22nd book in the Anita Blake: Vampire Hunter series. The novel follows Anita Blake and her various lovers as she travels to Colorado and works to uncover a series of murders and infections involving flesh-eating zombies.

Cover art was released to media outlets in October 2012. Affliction was published in July 2013 in hardcover and e-book editions. An unabridged audiobook followed later that year. Affliction’s publication coincided with the twentieth anniversary of the Anita Blake character. In 2013 it reached #5 on the New York Times bestseller list in multiple categories.

== Plot ==
Anita's heart sank as she received the phone call from Micah's distressed mother. His father, the enigmatic Rush Callahan, was dying. Without hesitation, she made arrangements to visit him, a sense of duty and compassion guiding her actions. However, as Micah pondered the situation, he realized the need to bring Nathaniel along. He had decided to introduce him as their significant other, a bold move that would test the limits of their relationship and the boundaries of society. Recognizing the potential danger, they assembled a formidable group of guards, including the skilled and loyal Nicky, Dev, Domino, Bram, Ares, and Lissandro, to ensure their safety on the perilous journey.

When the arrival at the Callahan estate, they were met with a somber atmosphere. Rush, once a vibrant and charismatic man, was now lying in his bed, his body ravaged by the relentless onslaught of a rotting zombie bite. The air was thick with a pungent stench, a grim reminder of the horrors that lurked beyond their doorstep. As Anita and Micah approached his bedside, they could see the pain and anguish etched upon Rush's face. He had fought valiantly against the infection, but time was running out. With trembling hands, Micah took his father's hand, offering him comfort and words of solace in his final moments.

After some mastery with Micah's aunt, Micah and Anita sought refuge at his mother's house. There, they were met with a revelation that sent shockwaves through their family. Micah's mother, Rush and Ty revealed that they shared a similar bond to the one between Micah, Anita, and Nathaniel. The news sent ripples of confusion and disbelief through the family, forcing Micah's mother to delve into their intricate past. While Anita and the remaining law enforcement agents present embarked on a perilous mission to hunt down the lurking vampires and zombies that plagued the town. However, fate had a sinister twist in store. During the hunt, Ares, a trusted member of their team, fell victim to a vicious bite from one of the grotesque zombies.

The rotting spread or through Ares' veins. As they desperately attempted to transport everyone to safety via a helicopter, Ares' self-control vanished, and a bloodlust took over. In a frenzy of violence, he turned on his former comrades, killing with reckless abandon. Anita, fueled by a surge of anger and desperation, confronted Ares. She struck him down, but a stray bullet that had passed through Ares' body found its way into her own. As Anita fell, a searing pain coursed through her, marking the moment she succumbed to the curse of hyena.

Arriving in town, Jean-Claude's affection for Anita was readily apparent. He wasted no time in proposing marriage, boldly declaring that if it were possible for them to wed everyone they loved, he would do so without hesitation. Anita's heart skipped a beat as she recalled a similar sentiment expressed by Nathaniel earlier. With a surge of joy and excitement, she accepted Jean-Claude's proposal. However, the practicalities of such an unconventional ceremony soon arose, prompting them to put their plans on hold. Anita realized that many of her lovers were deeply disappointed at the prospect of not receiving a ring. The sheer number of individuals involved posed a significant logistical challenge.

Undeterred, Anita and her allies continued their efforts to expand the Coalition's influence. Anita's ability to communicate effectively and her compassionate nature proved invaluable in winning over other animal groups. She employed a combination of diplomacy and gentle persuasion, but when necessary, she was not afraid to engage in battles for dominance. Through a multifaceted approach, she successfully integrated wolves, foxes, and even a colony of rabbits into the Coalition, further strengthening their collective cause.

In New Orleans, Edward shared his intentions to arrange a wedding date and unexpectedly requested Anita serve as his best man. As they delved into the heart of the matter, they discovered that the sinister force behind the decaying zombies was none other than Morte D'Amour, a figure long believed to be deceased. However, Morte D'Amour had cunningly absorbed some of Marmee Noire's potent necromantic abilities, granting him the power to manipulate the dead.

Armed with this newfound knowledge, Anita and Edward resolved to confront Morte D'Amour and put an end to his reign of terror. They ventured into a gloomy cemetery, where they faced off against a horde of the undead. Anita's formidable strength as a monster hunter proved to be an overwhelming match for Morte D'Amour's necromantic prowess. Anita outsmarted her adversary, unleashing her own formidable powers and vanquishing the undead threat that had plagued New Orleans.

== Characters ==
- Anita Blake
- Jean-Claude
- Edward
- Micah Callahan
- Nathaniel Graison
- Nicky
- Lover of Death

== Reception ==
Critical reception for Affliction was mostly positive. Publishers Weekly called Hamilton's take on zombies 'invigorating', while Kirkus lamented that much of the book consisted of Anita ‘preaching to the choir’. Several reviews mentioned the series' longevity, including the British Fantasy Society, who noted "The reader needs to feel that the events that take place are sufficiently different from previous novels in the sequence to continue to hold interest" and felt Hamilton had done enough to encourage both new and old readers.

In 2013, Affliction made the New York Times bestseller list in the following categories: #5 in Combined Print and E-book fiction, #5 in Hardcover Fiction, and #5 in E-Book Fiction. In its first week of release, the novel made #4 on the Publishers Weekly Hardcover Fiction list, selling 18,000 copies.

== Promotion ==
Hamilton used a variety of social media tools to promote the book, including a book trailer and a Reddit AMA. She had planned a book tour in support of the novel, but cancelled at the last minute due to illness.
