= Skin Trade (novel) =

2009 novel by Laurell K. Hamilton

- Author: Laurell K. Hamilton
- Language: English
- Series: Anita Blake: Vampire Hunter
- Genre: Horror, Mystery, Erotic novel
- Publisher: Berkley Books (Berkley edition)
- Publication date: June 2, 2009 (Berkley edition)
- Publication place: United States
- Media type: Print
- Pages: 486 p. (Berkley edition)
- ISBN: 978-0-425-22772-5 (Berkley edition)
- OCLC: 268795013
- Dewey Decimal: 813/.54 22
- LC Class: PS3558.A443357 S55 2009
- Preceded by: Blood Noir
- Followed by: Flirt

Skin Trade is the seventeenth book in the Anita Blake: Vampire Hunter series of horror/mystery/erotica novels by American author Laurell K. Hamilton. The audiobook is narrated by Kimberly Alexis.

== Plot ==
The story begins as Anita receives a frantic call from Edward, known as Ted Forrester, a notorious figure who serves as both a friend and a deadly adversary. Ted, a master of death with a mysterious past, informs Anita that their mutual client Vittorio, an ancient vampire with a penchant for manipulation has been implicated in a plot that commodifies supernatural beings, using their abilities and bodies for profit. Vittorio’s involvement raises a red flag for Anita, who knows that his ambitions are always tied to darker purposes.

Reluctantly, Anita enlists the help of her lover, Jean-Claude, the Master of the City of St. Louis, and Micah Callahan, chairman of the St. Louis Fuzzy Coalition. Together, they delve deeper into this underbelly of the city, which leads them to a group of weretigers, including the formidable Victor Belleci, a powerful leader in the local weretiger community. With tensions rising, they must navigate alliances with both deadly foes and unexpected allies, including Bernardo "Bernard" Spotted-Horse, a seasoned supernatural investigator with roots in the Native American community.

As Anita and her team investigate, they discover that the skin trade is not just about profit; it’s a perverse form of slavery that has targeted vulnerable supernatural beings. Eleanor, a young wereleopard, is found dead, and her tragic story becomes pivotal in urging Anita to uncover the truth. The emotional weight of the killings forces Anita to confront her own beliefs about right and wrong within a world where morality is often manipulated.

Amid escalating violence, they learn about a secret network led by a notorious practitioner known as "Cannibal" Rocco, who has been luring victims into a dark circle. Rocco represents a previous chapter in Anita’s life, a reminder of choices she has made that haunt her. She must confront this specter of her past while balancing her responsibilities to both her human friends and the supernatural community.

As the investigation progresses, Anita meets the Rodriguez family, who are embroiled in the chaos. They include Manuel and Consuela "Connie" Rodriguez, who are determined to save their children from being swept into the skin trade. The family's trials lead to a shocking discovery that reveals deep-seated corruption within the ranks of law enforcement, represented by officers like Rupert Shaw and Officer Baldwin, who are entangled in the web of complicity and greed.

As Anita races to prevent a potential war between the weretigers and the vampires, she faces moral dilemmas that test her allegiance to both communities. The stakes rise when an insidious figure emerges: Marmée Noir, the enigmatic "Mother of All Darkness," who seeks to capitalize on the chaos to consolidate her power, threatening to upend the fragile balance Anita has worked to create.

The final epilogure of the violence, with the skin trade dismantled and moral lines redrawn, Anita must confront the repercussions of her actions, the relationships that have been tested, and the grim realities of a world where darkness constantly looms. As she looks towards an uncertain future, the story leaves readers contemplating the continuous dance between light and shadow in a universe where nothing is truly black and white.

== Characters ==
=== Major characters ===
- Anita Blake: Anita travels to Vegas because if she did not, she believes other people will die. She goes without most of her loved ones because she is afraid that Vittorio will use them against her. However, her troupe of men is always near her mind as she has to prove the male characters in Vegas that she is dangerous and does not sleep with anything that moves. A main theme scattered in the pages is the idea of not adding to her list of men that she sleeps with, however, in the end there is no resolution. A few more men are added to list, actually.
- Edward / Ted Forrester: Edward plays Anita's main friend and adviser in 'Skin Trade' if there is a problem, Anita looks to him to help solve it. The problems that he helps her range from her metaphysical issues to defending her from Olaf. Edward acts a little like a boyfriend to her to keep Olaf at bay, since no one else that Anita dates or loves is dominant enough. Yet Anita says she could never feed off Edward in any way because it would be like doing a family member. Edward admits to have been contacted as Death to take out the Mother of Darkness and he turned down the contract. The price was right, but he admits that he has commitments now, his alter-ego Ted has people who love him and Edward would prefer to return home to them than to fight something potentially more dangerous than he is.
- Olaf / Otto Jefferies: In the beginning Olaf creeps Anita out repeatedly, as it becomes apparent that he "likes" her. As in, he'd like to date her. For Anita, Olaf would try to be normal, he admits. In a tight moment, he offers to feed her if needed and says it would be regular sex, as little blood as necessary. Anita dances around the subject, trying not to get on his bad side, always remembering that some day she may have to kill him for her safety.
- Bernardo Spotted Horse: Bernardo's role in the story is more comic relief. Anita cannot trust Olaf at her back and Edward as Death is scary to the preternatural community so the only other person to back Anita in situations is Bernardo. He mostly flirts with the female cast of the novel, but offers to be food if Anita needs him.
- Crispin: A Vegas white tiger that Anita called and slept with in a previous novel, he remains devoted to her. The epilogue mentions that Anita took him to St. Louis with her, as he is more loyal to her than to his tiger queen in Vegas.
- Max: Master Vampire of the City of Las Vegas. His animal to call is tiger, and he is married to Bibiana, who is the Queen of the White Tigers. They have a son, Victor, who is a lycanthrope (white tiger). Resembles a Las Vegas Gangster.

=== Minor characters ===
Recurring characters include:

- Wicked and Truth: The vampire brothers are supplied by Jean-Claude in Anita's time of need. They both feed her and show off their flying ability and emotional detachment. Anita voices a concern about her ardeur to them, asking them to kill her if it takes her over. They agree. The request seems well placed as the brothers murdered the head of their bloodline, and Anita doubts Edward could put her out of her misery if the situation demanded it.
- Requiem: He is unhappy with the situation in St. Louis and is hoping that by traveling to Vegas, he can find a new place to call home. He would like to have a woman who exclusively loves him rather than Anita who has many men to love.
- Jean-Claude: In Skin Trade, Jean-Claude acts a bit more like Richard than what might have been expected. He is jealous and moody when he speaks to Anita over the phone. However, he does manage to send a variety of lycanthropes and vampires to help her out toward the end of the story. Except for phone calls, he does not appear directly in the book. His presence in the book is indirect, as Anita longs to be with him instead of whatever she is currently facing in Vegas or when Anita is thinking about her life back in St. Louis.
- Marmee Noir: The Mother of All Darkness attacks Anita a few times in the novel, yet at the end is supposedly killed by a human attack on her resting place. She is a sort of red herring in the book since Anita believes she is to blame for the were-tiger issues she has. She had hoped to possess Anita's body since Anita and her had similar powers when she was alive. However, she is too weak and the attempt to mingle all the tigers' colors/powers and feed off that energy is defeated by her death.
- Vittorio: A centuries-old vampire who was mentioned in passing in Incubus Dreams. It is revealed that he is far more powerful than he first seemed and, like so many other male characters, he wants Anita but he cannot have her because of holy water damages he sustained and because she does not want him back. He has a ring that can control jinn and his animal to call is the tiger. He and Marmee Noir shared a history: she took most of his powers and left him mostly helpless in the world. However, with her awakening, he has been regaining his powers and Anita must destroy him before he lays waste to Vegas. As Marmee Noir has a nickname of "Mother of All Darkness," his name is "Father of the Day" or "Father of the Tigers."

=== Other characters ===
New characters include:

- Victor: Max's and Bibiana's white tiger son. Tiger clans are usually run by females, but Victor's power could place him as a king, he is that dominant. Bibiana would be happy to have Anita wed to him, but Anita is a bit "unavailable."
- Domino: A were-tiger with the ability to change into either a black tiger or a white tiger. His hair reflects the color of the tiger he last changed into. In the beginning he is wary of Anita, but she wins him over as the black tiger clan is scarce in members.
- Ava: Bibiana's assistant turned traitor. She is a victim to a were-tiger attack and in Bibiana's clan seen as a lesser member because she's not a pure blood lycanthrope.
- Bibiana: Queen ("Chang") of the White Tigers of Las Vegas, Wife of Max, Master Vampire of the City of Las Vegas, and Victor's mother. Pushing to have her son and Anita start a branch White Tiger Clan.
- Cynric: A 16-year-old blue weretiger and not of legal age of consent in St. Louis, Missouri, which is 17. However, In Vegas, the legal age of consent is 16. Anita is perturbed by his youth and his devotion to her after a vampire-induced group orgy that Vittorio used to gain back many of his powers that Mamee Noir stripped from him. Bibiana intends to send him for mating with Anita as soon as he is 17.
