= The Killing Dance =

1997 novel by Laurell K. Hamilton

- 1997 US cover
- Author: Laurell K. Hamilton
- Cover artist: Lee MacLeod (Ace edition)
- Language: English
- Series: Anita Blake: Vampire Hunter
- Genre: Horror, mystery, erotic
- Publisher: Ace Books (Ace edition)
- Publication date: 1997 (Ace edition)
- Publication place: United States
- Media type: Print (Paperback)
- Pages: 387 (Ace edition)
- ISBN: 0-441-00452-0 Ace edition
- OCLC: 36914737
- Preceded by: Bloody Bones
- Followed by: Burnt Offerings

The Killing Dance is a horror/mystery novel by American writer Laurell K. Hamilton, the sixth book in the Anita Blake: Vampire Hunter series.

== Plot ==
A gruesome scene unfolds in St. Louis, the body of a young woman found drained of blood, with strange symbols carved into her chest. Anita is called to the scene by the police, alerted by the unsettling ritualistic elements. She quickly identifies the symbols as belonging to a long-forgotten cult known as the Dance of the Dead, a ritual designed to raise the dead and create undead warriors, has been dormant for centuries, but its reappearance spells danger for the city.

Anita dives into the investigation, encountering familiar faces: Officer Brady and Detective Branswell on the case, along with her partner-in-crime, the enigmatic vampire Jean-Claude. She discovers evidence of a resurgence of necromantic activity, linking the ritualistic murders to a mysterious organization called The Shadow’s leader, revealed to be a powerful necromancer known as The Maestro, has been manipulating events from the shadows, orchestrating the resurgence of the Dance of the Dead for unknown purposes.

Meanwhile, Anita faces personal turmoil her relationship with Jean-Claude is strained, their differing worldviews causing friction. Her loyal werewolf, Richard, is haunted by the return of his old foe, Marcus, a dangerous werewolf with a grudge against Asher and Anita. The investigation takes an unexpected turn when Anita discovers that her old friend, Sylvie Barker, is deeply involved with the Shadow, as is her werewolf lover, Sebastian. This revelation forces Anita to confront the reality that some of her closest allies may be working against her, adding an emotional weight to the case.

The Maestro unleashes a wave of undead upon the city, turning St. Louis into a battlefield between the living and the dead. Anita must race against time to stop the Maestro and prevent the resurrection of a powerful and ancient entity, the Dark Mother, who is said to possess the ability to control the dead. The Shadow, having infiltrated several key positions within the city, including the police force, becomes increasingly difficult to infiltrate. Anita's network of allies is tested, leading to betrayals, alliances, and intense clashes between forces of good and evil.

Despite the obstacles, Anita rallies her allies, including her trusted team of weretigers, led by Christine, and the enigmatic vampire, Dominic Dumare. She receives unexpected help from the vampire, Edward Forrester, who provides crucial information about The Maestro and the Shadow. A surprise alliance with the rival werewolf pack, led by Stephen, brings unexpected support against Jamil's growing influence.

Anita discovers that The Maestro is the long-lost descendant of a powerful necromancer who sought to control the Dark Mother. He is driven by a desire for power, seeking to use the entity to rule both the living and the dead. The battle takes place within the abandoned catacombs beneath the city, where The Maestro has gathered his army of undead. Anita must face her fears and confront The Maestro in a battle of shadows, utilizing her necromantic abilities and her allies' strength to defeat him and prevent the return of the Dark Mother.

After a bloody battle, Anita and her allies emerge victorious, but the city of St. Louis bears the scars of the conflict. The Shadow is dissolved, but its influence lingers, leaving Anita and her allies to face the long process of rebuilding and restoring order. The personal cost of the conflict is heavy, with the loss of lives, both human and supernatural, leaving Anita haunted by the events. The story ends with a sense of bittersweet triumph, a reminder that the battle between good and evil is never truly over, leaving the door open for future accolades.

== Characters ==
=== Major characters ===
The Killing Dance features the following major characters.

- Anita Blake: Anita's primary developments in this novel are romantic, as she attempts, unsuccessfully, to forge a life with Richard, then ultimately selects Jean-Claude. She also experiences significant political developments, as her developing powers draw her deeper into Jean-Claude's vampire power structure and into the political world of Richard's werewolf pack.
- Jean-Claude: Jean-Claude continues to present something of an enigma. Although he claims to love Anita, the character of Sabin serves as an example of the danger of absolute love to a vampire, as does Jean-Claude's story of the tragic ending of his love affair with Asher and Julianna. Although he may well be in love, Anita is well aware that Jean-Claude remains very calculating, and that, as usual, the events of The Killing Dance seem to work out to Jean-Claude's benefit more than anyone else's—by the end of the novel, Anita is Jean-Claude's lover alone, Jean-Claude's rivals, Marcus and Raina are dead, and Anita and Richard are bound to Jean-Claude as his human and animal servants.
- Richard: This novel underscores Richard's essentially tragic nature. Although Richard is extraordinarily blessed—phenomenally powerful, fantastically handsome, in requited love with his apparent soulmate—he lacks the essential self-knowledge needed to resolve his crisis. Richard is unable to integrate his human and werewolf natures, and this tragic flaw haunts him throughout the series. This novel, where Richard finally reveals his true nature to Anita and is rejected, represents the beginning of a long slide for the character that has yet to resolve.
- Edward: Edward is his typical self—an inscrutable and deadly serial killer. However, in this novel, he continues to show hints of some other emotional existence. In particular, his fondness for Anita begins to look something like friendship, and to suggest the possibility of an emotional inner life.

=== Other characters ===
Recurring characters in The Killing Dance include:

- Reappearances of RPIT members Dolph Storr, Zerbrowski and the introduction of RPIT's first witch Tammy Reynolds. As Anita's relationship with Jean-Claude becomes public knowledge and her public death toll rises, Dolph begins to show seeds of the distrust that would manifest between them over the course of the next several novels.
- The reappearance of the vampire Willie McCoy and the introduction of newly arrived vampires Damian and Liv.
- The reappearance of shapeshifters Rafael, Lillian, Christine, Jason and Stephen and the introduction of Stephen's twin brother, the wereleopard Gregory, new pack enforcer Jamil, and pack member Sylvie.
- Miscellaneous other characters, particularly Catherine Maison-Gillette, Mrs. Pringle and Monica Vespucci.

Non-recurring characters include:

- Police detectives Greeley and Branswell.
- Pack members Heidi and Neal.

The death toll in The Killing Dance includes:

- The dark mirror to Anita's own triumvirate: Sabin (shot by Anita); Dominic Dumare (shot by Edward) and Cassandra (shot by Harley and/or died when Anita killed Sabin).
- Jean-Claude's vampire flunky Robert (heart torn out by Dominic).
- Assassins for hire Jimmy "Jimmy the Shotgun" Dugan (a cheap local thug) and "Annabelle Smith" (a pricy international assassin), both killed by Anita.
- Local lycanthropes Sebastian (shot by Edward); Marcus (killed by Richard in battle of succession); Gabriel (stabbed by Anita); and Raina (shot by Anita).
