= Bullet (novel) =

2010 novel by Laurell K. Hamilton

- First edition (US)
- Author: Laurell K. Hamilton
- Language: English
- Series: Anita Blake: Vampire Hunter
- Genre: Horror, Mystery, Erotic novel
- Publisher: Berkley Books (Berkley edition)
- Publication date: June 1, 2010 (Berkley edition)
- Publication place: United States
- Media type: Print
- Pages: 368 p. (Berkley edition)
- ISBN: 978-0-7553-5258-6 (Berkley edition)
- Preceded by: Flirt
- Followed by: Hit List

Bullet is the nineteenth book in the Anita Blake: Vampire Hunter series of horror/mystery/erotica novels by Laurell K. Hamilton. It debuted at #2 on The New York Times Best Seller list for Hardcover Fiction.

== Plot ==
Anita Blake is faced with a new threat when a series of mysterious murders occur in the heart of the city, targeting supernatural creatures across different species. As a necromancer, Anita is intimately familiar with the supernatural, but these killings are executed with a precision that hints at a highly skilled hunter someone who knows how to exploit the weaknesses of both vampires and shifters alike.

Anita’s investigation draws her deeper into an escalating conflict between vampire factions led by Jean-Claude, the charismatic vampire master, and a rival group led by the cunning and dangerous Vampire known as Truth. Add to this mix the leadership struggles within the wereleopard and werewolf packs including Richard Zeeman’s werewolf pack and Micah Callahan's wereleopard clan and the delicate truce among them begins to unravel.

Simultaneously, a new manipulator emerges the Council, a governing body that oversees supernatural affairs, represented by the sinister Belle Morte and her cohorts, including Padma and the Dragon. They see the chaos as an opportunity to sow discord and reclaim authority over the supernatural populace, all while hiding their own dark secrets.

As Anita navigates her way through the factions, she is joined by her wereleopard lover, Nathaniel Graison, her werewolf ex-boyfriend Richard, and the ever-loyal Jean-Claude and Asher. They must uncover the identity of the killer while preventing a war that could decimate the supernatural community. The tension rises as they find hints of an ancient prophecy that speaks of a "Lover of Death" Morte D’Amour which may be behind the chaos, seeking to eliminate any threats to her position and dominance.

Anita also faces personal struggles, particularly with her relationships, her loyalties divided as Richard seeks to protect his pack and Jean-Claude attempts to consolidate his power among the vampires. Complicating things further, Matthew Vespucci, a half-vampire harboring his own agenda plays a pivotal role in skewing the dynamics, leaving everyone uncertain of his true intentions.

As betrayals come to light, Anita confronts her own views on power and leadership while embracing her unique abilities. During a tense standoff among the factions, Anita realizes that the truth may not only lie in defeating an enemy but understanding the divisions within her own heart. Together with her allies, she hatches a daring plan to confront that Truth and expose secrets that could shatter the Council's grip on power.

The final culmination, Anita successfully unravels the threads of the conspiracy, confronting Morte D’Amour and forcing a reckoning among the factions. Though peace is restored, it doesn’t come without consequences. Relationships are altered, trust is reshaped, and Anita accepts that the duality of her identity human and necromancer will forever be a source of strength and vulnerability.

== Characters ==
=== Major characters ===
- Anita Blake
- Jean-Claude
- Asher
- Richard
- Micah
- Nathaniel

=== Other characters ===
- Damian
- Nicky, one-eyed werelion, a "Bride" of Anita's rather than an Animal-to-call, he is completely loyal to her because of being deep rolled by Anita in Flirt
- Haven, a would-be werelion Rex to Anita's Regina, violent and very possessive of her in front of other werelions.
