= Cerulean Sins =

2003 novel by Laurell K. Hamilton

- 2003 US hardcover edition
- Author: Laurell K. Hamilton
- Cover artist: Craig White (US editions)
- Language: English
- Series: Anita Blake: Vampire Hunter
- Genre: mystery, horror, Erotic novel
- Publisher: Berkley Books (Berkley edition)
- Publication date: 2003 (Berkley edition)
- Publication place: United States
- Media type: Print (Paperback)
- Pages: 405 (Berkley edition)
- ISBN: 0-425-18836-1 (Berkley edition)
- OCLC: 51150692
- Dewey Decimal: 813/.54 21
- LC Class: PS3558.A443357 C4 2003
- Preceded by: Narcissus in Chains
- Followed by: Incubus Dreams

Cerulean Sins is a horror/mystery/erotica novel by American writer Laurell K. Hamilton, the eleventh book in the Anita Blake: Vampire Hunter.

== Plot ==
Cerulean Sins apparently takes place some time after the events of the previous novel, Narcissus in Chains. Anita is happily living with Micah and Nathaniel and dating Micah and Jean-Claude. However, as usual, Anita is confronted by a series of simultaneous problems.

First, she appears to be attracting the attention of a number of spies, including Leo Harlan, a professional assassin who claims to want Anita to reanimate one of his ancestors to assist in genealogical research and two mercenaries who Anita arrests via her Federal Marshal status after noticing them following her.

Second, Jean-Claude is unpleasantly surprised by an early visit from Musette and her entourage, all of whom are representatives of the founder of Jean-Claude's bloodline, Belle Morte and represent an attempt by Belle Morte to test and possibly punish or capture Jean-Claude and his followers.

Third, Anita learns of a series of shockingly brutal rapes and murders, apparently committed by a shapeshifter serial killer. However, because of her deteriorating relationship with Dolph, Anita is unable to get cooperation from the police in solving the crimes.

Anita ultimately learns that the mercenaries have been spying on her to consider recruiting her for a secret mission overseas. As Agent Bradford warned Anita in Obsidian Butterfly, Anita has come to the attention of one or more secret agencies within the US government. Luckily for Anita, at her mentor Marianne's insistence, Anita had stopped using animal sacrifices to raise zombies. Without the additional power granted by an animal sacrifice, Anita's zombies were sufficiently "zombie-looking" to convince the mercenaries that she would not be able to perform the job, arguably validating Marianne's belief that the animal sacrifices would result in bad karma.

When the kidnapping lies, Anita confronts, outmaneuvers, or defeats Belle Morte several times. First, she and Jean-Claude take Asher to their cerulean bed in a menage a trois, making Asher their lover and therefore immune to most of Belle Morte's advances. Second, Anita, with help from Richard, Jean-Claude, and her wereleopards, is able to block Belle Morte's attempts to make Anita her human servant. Third, Anita is ultimately able to trap Musette in their game of courtly politics, proving that Belle Morte and her proxy Musette has violated the terms of her invitation and forcing Musette and her people to leave.

More alarmingly, Anita begins to believe that Belle Morte is planning a war against the Mother of Darkness, the oldest and most powerful of the world's vampires. Although Anita and Jean-Claude do their best to avoid that conflict, the Mother of Darkness is beginning to awaken from a millennia-long sleep, and seems interested in Anita. Finally, Anita helps Zerbrowski track down the shapeshifting serial killer, who turns out to be a werewolf member of the mercenary team sent to observe Anita herself. After a confrontation in which several police officers are killed, Anita tracks down the werewolf a second time and executes him.

In the epilogue, Anita explains that she is continuing to date Micah and Jean-Claude, and that she has also added Asher to her list of lovers. She and Richard are still broken up, but Richard appears to be overcoming his death wish. Two of Belle Morte's vampires have received permission to remain in St. Louis, both to repair the damage done by their visit and to attempt to stay out of the way of any conflict between Belle Morte and the Mother of Darkness.

== Characters ==
=== Major characters ===
Cerulean Sins features the following major characters.

- Anita Blake: Anita has gained Federal Marshal status in this novel and uses it a few times to get into the preternatural crime scenes. She also mentions that she is now a partner in Animators, Inc. and consequently Bert is no longer her exact boss anymore. In the realm of her lovers, she wonders if she has been too restricting on them with her rules, if she is being fair to them.
- Jean-Claude: Jean-Claude has gained a new power by an unknown means and is now the same status as Belle Morte, a sourde de sang.
- Richard: Richard cut off his hair which Anita says is a psychological tell that he was not a happy camper. Later he tells Anita that he had wanted to die, but now he wants to live. He and Anita do not make up or grow any closer in this novel.
- Asher: Asher and Jean-Claude come to a resolved point in their relationship until Anita can handle being rolled by Asher in bed. Asher nearly leaves and would have put a strain on Jean-Claude and Anita's relationship, but in the end stays. Anita says at the end, she has dated two men at the same time before, but not during the same date before.
- Zerbrowski: With Dolph being suspended with pay after an emotional break through about monsters, Zerbrowski took the lead throughout the murder investigations. He gained sergeant status in this book and still managed to tease Anita rather repeatedly, while releasing the stress of the horrific murders.

=== Other characters ===
Recurring characters include:

- Damian: While mentioned when Musette first came to St. Louis, Damian did not play a major part in this book. His calming effect on Anita was noted, because a servant can only give to the master what they have to offer and Damian had learned to restrain his emotions.
- Micah: and Nathaniel: Micah and Nathaniel play minor roles in this book, mostly to assist Anita or hinder, in that order. Nathaniel had taken on the role of Anita's ardeur feeder however, he needed more of a rest time in between feedings. In this book Anita starts to wonder what will happen to Nathaniel once she no longer needs him to feed the ardeur. She seems to be very comfortable with her role as another housemate and bedmate to these two characters and yet uncertain how long it will last or if it should.
- Jason: Jason, in this novel, finally "gets to take one for the team" which is a change for him since Anita usually doesn't treat him as a sexual being, despite his teasings.
- Dolph: Dolph's issues with monsters and his son in love with a vampire member of the Church of Eternal Life, reaches a breaking point. He admits on camera that he thinks Jason should be locked up simply for being a werewolf, that he's dangerous supposedly. Dolph had reached lieutenant status in the force, but after tearing up a suspect interrogation room at the police station in a rage, his career was questionable.

Non-recurring characters include: Two werewolves that were used to track the rapist who was an alpha werewolf from a different country.

The death toll in Cerulean Sins includes: Four murder victims, three women and one man. The man was running from something and his death was a message for others who had tried to hide. The other three were unrelated but by the same bad guy who died in the end after Anita received an execution order for him. He had slaughtered the three women, reduced them to handfuls of meat and other body parts, essentially painting the wall with their blood. (2 police officers also die while trying to apprehend the suspect)

== Major themes ==
Power struggles are central to this novel, and at this point Anita has become an equal power to the Vampire Council, as discussed in a comparison of the series to Buffy the Vampire Slayer by media scholar Kevin Durand. Durand argues that the power imbalance between men and women in earlier novels, where Anita is still gaining new powers and learning to deal with new responsibilities, is now equalised.
