= Burnt Offerings (Hamilton novel) =

1998 novel by Laurell K. Hamilton

- 1998 US cover
- Author: Laurell K. Hamilton
- Cover artist: Lee MacLeod (Ace edition)
- Language: English
- Series: Anita Blake: Vampire Hunter
- Genre: Horror, Mystery, Erotic novel
- Publisher: Ace Books (Ace edition)
- Publication date: 1998 (Ace edition)
- Publication place: United States
- Media type: Print (Paperback)
- Pages: 392 pp (Ace edition)
- ISBN: 0-441-00524-1 (Ace edition)
- OCLC: 38900055
- Preceded by: The Killing Dance
- Followed by: Blue Moon

Burnt Offerings is the seventh in the Anita Blake: Vampire Hunter series of horror/mystery/erotica novels by Laurell K. Hamilton.

== Plot ==
Anita, already burdened by her responsibilities to the vampires in her life—primarily Jean-Claude, the Master of the City, and Richard Zeeman, her werewolf lover—struggles with the growing tension among them. Jean-Claude is determined to leverage the focus on the recent murders to expand his influence in St. Louis, while Richard fears for Anita's safety and the repercussions of their connections to the occult.

As the investigation heats up, they gather intel from a range of supernatural allies, including the werewolves—exemplified by Malcolm, Asher, and Gregory. Meanwhile, ancient and powerful forces, exemplified by the enigmatic Padma and his followers, begin to emerge as key suspects.

Anita faces pressure on multiple fronts as the murders escalate, claiming several lives connected to the supernatural community. Keeping her relationships intact, she enlists the aid of creature-friendly police officers, including Larry Kirkland, who struggles with his own biases against vampires, and Veronica "Ronnie" Sims, who provides technological support.

The investigation leads Anita, Dolph, Zerbrowski, and their team to a series of hidden locations—abandoned buildings that serve as the hideouts for those performing the ritualistic murders. They discover that the burnt offerings are linked to an ancient vampire sect that seeks to awaken an ancient power tied to fire and sacrifice. Balthazar, an older vampire with deep ties to this eldritch sect, becomes a critical source of information, albeit an elusive one.

Meanwhile, personal tensions rise as Anita's romantic connections face strain. Richard’s aggressive stance against Jean-Claude leads to a violent confrontation, testing Anita’s ability to mediate between them. The situation worsens when Jean-Claude is framed for one of the murders, pushing Anita into a frantic race against time to clear his name.

With tensions boiling over and supernatural forces beginning to take sides, Anita rallies her allies, including Nathaniel Graison, Damian, and Jason Schuyler, to confront the true puppeteers behind the cult. They discover that the cult is led by the twisted Traveler, who seeks not only ritual sacrifices but also personal vendettas against the existing supernatural order, particularly targeting Jean-Claude and Richard.

They prepare for an explosive encounter at a remnant of an ancient temple. Raina and Zane, powerful associates of the Traveler, disrupt their plans to rescue Jean-Claude, leading to multiple fights breaking out.

During the chaotic confrontation, sacrificial fires rage out of control, and the very fabric of reality feels threatened. With the help of unexpected unity among her allies, Anita manages to disrupt the ritual just in time, leading to a powerful confrontation against the Traveler and his minions.

After a hard-fought battle with significant losses, Anita ultimately emerges victorious but not unscathed. The truth about the cult’s reach throughout the city emerges, revealing hidden complicity among certain supernatural factions. Jean-Claude's name is cleared, but the consequences of these events leave a lingering shadow over their relationships, pushing Anita to question her place in the world.

In the aftermath, Anita faces the reality of her relationships, weighing the pull of her supernatural duties against her feelings for Richard and Jean-Claude. The story ends with a reflective moment where she realizes she can’t protect everyone and begins to embrace her duality as a necromancer and vampire hunter, hinting at the complexities of the supernatural world that lay ahead.

== Characters ==
=== Major characters ===
- Anita Blake
- Jean-Claude
- Richard

=== Other characters ===
Recurring characters in Burnt Offerings include:

- Anita's friends and coworkers Larry and Ronnie.
- Police officers Dolph, Zerbrowski, Clive Perry, and Tammy Reynolds
- Werewolves Irving, Jason, Jamil, Stephen, Sylvie and Teddy;
- Wereleopards Cherry, Elizabeth, Nathaniel, Vivian, and Zane;
- Wererats Lillian and Rafael;
- Vampires Asher (Anita Blake: Vampire Hunter), Damian, Liv, and Willie; and
- Jean-Claude's human flunky Ernie.

Non-recurring characters include:

- Gwen: Sylvie Barker's girlfriend.
- Hannah: One of Jean-Claude's vampires. Hannah is also dating Willie McCoy.
- Captain Pete McKinnon, a fire captain.
- Vampire Council members The Traveler and The Master of Beasts.
- Vampire Council retainers Balthasar, Gideon, and Captain Thomas Carswell.
- Werewolves Kevin and Lorraine
