= Incubus Dreams =

2004 novel by Laurell K. Hamilton

- 2004 US hardback cover
- Author: Laurell K. Hamilton
- Cover artist: Jacket design by Judith Morello, cover photo (c) Antonius/Alamy Images (US editions)
- Language: English
- Series: Anita Blake: Vampire Hunter
- Genre: mystery; horror; erotic
- Publisher: Berkley Books
- Publication date: 2004
- Publication place: United States
- Media type: Print (paperback)
- Pages: 658
- ISBN: 0-425-19824-3
- OCLC: 55962327
- Dewey Decimal: 813/.54 22
- LC Class: PS3558.A443357 I53 2004
- Preceded by: Cerulean Sins
- Followed by: Micah

Incubus Dreams is a 2004 horror/mystery/erotica novel by American writer Laurell K. Hamilton, the twelfth book in the Anita Blake: Vampire Hunter series.

== Plot ==
Incubus Dreams apparently takes place a few weeks after the events of Cerulean Sins. As usual, Anita must juggle several problems simultaneously.

First, in her job as an animator, Anita must respond to the request of Barbara and Steve Brown that Anita raise their dead son, Stevie Brown, a high school student murdered three years earlier, probably by an acquaintance. Anita explains that it is not possible to raise a murder victim and question them, because that kind of zombie has only one purpose to kill the murderer, but agrees to assist the police in investigating the murder.

Second, Anita continues to wrestle with the metaphysical problems raised by her recent increase in power. She, Jean-Claude, Richard, and Damian are all experiencing unexpected increases in their magical power, with unpredictable results.

Third, Anita continues to assist Jean-Claude with vampire politics, as Jean-Claude confronts a challenge from The Dragon and her offspring, Primo and as Anita and Jean-Claude realize that the vampires in town that follow Malcolm rather than Jean-Claude have not been bound by blood oath, leaving them as essentially unrestrained predators.

Fourth, Anita's personal life becomes increasingly complex, both as a result of Anita's increasing ardeur and as a result of the personal problems of the various people involved. In particular, Nathaniel has decided that his relationship with Anita should advance to a sexual relationship, Damian continues to struggle with his role as Anita's vampire servant, and Anita's love/hate relationship with Richard remains as powerful as ever. Anita also must deal with jealousy from Jessica Arnett, an RPIT detective with a crush on Nathaniel, and with increasing distrust by various police officers as a result of her close relationship with the city's vampires and shapeshifters and as a result of her increasingly sexually based abilities. Fifth, Anita attempts to assist the police in solving a series of vampire serial killings, apparently focusing on area strip club workers or patrons.

With regard to the Stevie Brown murder, although Anita agrees to investigate, she is unable to make progress on the investigation during this novel, and notes in the epilogue that she intends to review Brown's personal effects with Evans soon. Evans is a very powerful psychometrist.

With regard to Anita's metaphysical problems, she makes considerable progress. Anita learns that she can partially control the ardeur by drawing power from others' lust and by ensuring that her other desires, such as physical hunger, do not go unfulfilled. Richard realizes that a great deal of his unstable behavior in recent novels is a result of his acquiring Anita's rage through their spiritual link, and Jean-Claude begins to stabilize his own power after Anita gives him permission to feed on the lust of his club patrons.

Anita also makes progress on resolving the vampire politics issues that arise in this novel. Using her own powers and her link to Jean-Claude, she binds Primo to Jean-Claude's service, and, with her challenge defeated, The Dragon expresses interest in negotiating with Jean-Claude. Anita also accepts Wicked and Truth, two other warrior vampires, into Jean-Claude's service, greatly increasing Jean-Claude's ability to resist physical challenges. However, the issue of Malcolm's vampires remains unresolved, as both Anita and Jean-Claude believe that without a blood oath, some of the vampires of the Church of Eternal Life will eventually revert to predators.

Anita's personal life also resolves in a number of ways. She accepts Nathaniel as the fourth of her concurrent lovers, and she and Richard also agree to renew their relationship. Although Nathaniel and Micah appear to accept or want Anita as their only lover, Anita reluctantly agrees to accept Richard's decision to date other people, and allows Jean-Claude to begin feeding his lust from others, at least spiritually. The major unresolved issues in Anita's personal life appear to be her relationship with Damian, who she attempts to offer more independence but who also wants to be one of her lovers, and her role as a law enforcement officer, which is becoming more and more difficult as she continues to identify with the monsters. Anita is unable to resolve the serial killer investigation fully. Although she and the police kill several of the lesser vampires responsible for the murders, the more powerful vampires escape to kill in another city, particularly their leader, Vittorio. Anita promises herself that she will track Vittorio and his remaining followers down.

In the epilogue, Anita explains that she has bought gifts for her various lovers (except for Richard), and that she is committed to continuing her life as a vampire executioner, and to resolving the remaining open plotlines discussed above.

== Characters ==
=== Major characters ===
Incubus Dreams features the following major characters.

- Anita Blake
- Jean-Claude
- Richard
- Asher
- Micah
- Damian
- Nathaniel
- Requiem
- Byron

=== Other characters ===
Recurring characters include:

- Malcolm
- Wicked and Truth are introduced
