= Flirt (novel) =

2010 erotic thriller by Laurell K. Hamilton

- First edition (US)
- Author: Laurell K. Hamilton
- Language: English
- Series: Anita Blake: Vampire Hunter
- Genre: Horror, Mystery, Erotic novel
- Publisher: Berkley Books (Berkley edition)
- Publication date: February 2, 2010 (Berkley edition)
- Publication place: United States
- Media type: Print
- Pages: 192 p. (Berkley edition)
- ISBN: 978-0-425-23567-6 (Berkley edition)
- OCLC: 432988229
- Preceded by: Skin Trade
- Followed by: Bullet

Flirt is a 2010 New York Times bestselling erotic thriller by novelist Laurell K. Hamilton. The novella was published on February 2, 2010, by Berkley Hardcover and is the eighteenth book in the Anita Blake: Vampire Hunter series. The afterword of Flirt contains several pages of discussion about Hamilton's inspiration for the novella as well as a comic by Jennie Breeden.

== Plot ==
Anita Blake, the renowned vampire hunter and necromancer, finds herself at a crossroads in her life. With her relationships with Micah Callahan, Nathaniel Graison, and the enigmatic Jean-Claude becoming increasingly complicated, Anita is forced to confront her feelings as they navigate an increasingly dangerous world filled with supernatural politics.

When a new threat arises in the form of a powerful vampire named Tony Bennington, recently resurrected by the infamous necromancer Belle Morte, Anita must unite her unusual family composed of her lovers Micah, Nathaniel, Jason Schuyler, and Jean-Claude to confront this looming danger. Tony, whose resurrection was meant to serve as a pawn in Belle Morte’s game of power, has his own agenda: to claim the throne of the vampire hierarchy for himself.

He stirs up discord among the vampires and werewolves by calling into question the delicate balance of power that exists in St. Louis. Using his charisma and cunning, he tries to win over their loyalties through flirtation and manipulation, preying on their desires and weaknesses.

As tensions rise, Anita gets inexplicably drawn into a web of flirtation herself, both from Tony's charms and the involvement of Jacob Leon, a fierce werewolf whose interest in Anita complicates her already tumultuous relationship with Micah and Nathaniel. To add to the confusion, old family ties surface when Grandmother Blake shows up, claiming she has vital information about a hidden threat buried deep in Anita's past.

As the distinction between allies and enemies blurs, Anita relies on her associates and romantic partners. The plot features the return of characters such as Ahsan, Nicky, and Mary, who provide background information and lore. Amid growing external threats, Anita must navigate her relationships and personal challenges.

The clock ticks and battles loom, Anita uncovers secrets about Belle Morte's true intentions and how they connect to her own past. The stakes escalate when it is revealed that Tony isn't just seeking power—he aims to unleash an ancient threat that could devastate both the vampire and human realms.

The borrowed tells on the alliances are tested, old grudges surface, and passions ignite, Anita must remember that in the game of power and desire, trusting the right heart can be the ultimate weapon or the gravest mistake. A dual conversation with Tony sparks a revelation about Anita's ancestry. She utilizes her necromancy in ways never before seen, leading to newfound acceptance from her lovers and peers.

In the aftermath, hearts are laid bare, and Anita must decide who she wants to be, not just as a hunter, but as a woman capable of embracing love in its many forms while still holding onto her sense of self. The story ends on a hopeful note, hinting at new relationships blossoming and unresolved tensions, promising more adventures to come in the supernatural world of St. Louis.

== Characters ==
=== Major characters ===
- Anita Blake: Anita is held against her will to raise a rich man's wife.
- Micah Callahan: Nimir-Raj to Anita's Nimir-Ra. The first to be shot should Anita refuse to do as she's told.
- Jean-Claude
- Jason Schuyler: Anita's Wolf to call. Used as leverage to ensure Anita does what she's told
- Nathaniel Graison: Anita's Leopard to call. Used as leverage to ensure Anita does what she's told

=== Other characters ===
New characters include:

- Tony Bennington: Wealthy man unable to accept that his trophy wife is gone.
- Jacob Leon: Alpha werelion, Rex of his pride and professional mercenary, his lion is attracted to Anita's lioness.
- Nicky: One-eyed werelion, Jacob's second in command. He is attracted to Anita, since she isn't upset by his deformity, as female werelions are not attracted to signs of weakness.
- Ellen: Werelion, but also a witch, and lesbian as mentioned by Nicky.
- Silas: Another werelion working for Jacob. Psychopath.

== Reception ==
Critical reception for Flirt has been mixed. Reviewers for BlogCritics.org were neutral to negative towards the book, with one stating that Hamilton has "strayed into muddy waters in terms on continuity of story and is having trouble keeping herself afloat". The other reviewer criticized the plot as "incredibly thin" but also stated that Flirt "reads quickly and the pacing stays on for the most part". A reviewer for the Library Journal praised the audiobook narration of Kimberly Alexis.
