= Kiss the Dead =

Novel by Laurell K. Hamilton

- Author: Laurell K. Hamilton
- Language: English
- Series: Anita Blake: Vampire Hunter
- Genre: Horror, Mystery, erotic
- Publisher: Berkley Hardcover
- Publication date: June 5, 2012
- Publication place: United States
- Media type: Print
- Pages: 368
- ISBN: 0425247546
- Preceded by: Hit List (novel)
- Followed by: Affliction (novel)

Kiss the Dead is a 2012 erotic thriller by American writer Laurell K. Hamilton. The book was published on June 5, 2012 by Berkley Hardcover and is the twenty first book in the Anita Blake: Vampire Hunter series.

== Plot ==
Kiss the Dead centers on U.S. Marshal Anita Blake as she attempts to sort through her ever increasingly complicated personal life while dealing with a vampire that is breaking both vampire and human laws by turning underage teens and children into the undead. Meanwhile Anita also has to deal with the fragile ego of the ancient vampire Asher, whose jealous behavior threatens the physical and emotional well-being of all around him.

== Reception ==
Critical reception to Kiss the Dead has been mixed to positive, with Publishers Weekly writing that there's "nothing here that Hamilton hasn’t done already, but there’s enough to sustain readers until Anita’s next escapade." The St. Louis Post-Dispatch praised the book, citing the "heart-stopping climax" as a highlight. News.com.au called Kiss the Dead the "literary version of comfort food" and "a fun ride for the most part". ScienceFiction.com stated that the novel was "the best offering in the Anita Blake Vampire Hunter series I’ve seen in a while" but that the repetition of phrases and character descriptions "could have been better". Romantic Times gave Kiss the Dead two stars, writing that the book felt "unbalanced and unfocused".
