= Corone =

Corone (Ancient Greek: Κορώνη, romanized: Korṓnē, lit. 'crow') may refer to:

- Koroni, also spelled Corone, a town in Greece
- Corone (Messenia), a town in ancient Messenia
- Corone (crow), a character in Greek mythology
- Corone (bread), a Japanese sweet bread

== See also ==
- Coronis (disambiguation)
