= Coronis =

Coronis may refer to:

- Coronis (diacritic)
- Coronis (mythology)
  - Coronis (lover of Apollo)
- Coronis (textual symbol)
- USS Coronis (ARL-10), a repair ship that served in World War II
- Coronis, a zarzuela by Spanish composer Sebastián Durón
- A genus of butterfly, for species such as Coronis hyphasis

== See also ==
- Corone (disambiguation)
- Koronis (disambiguation)
