= Koronis Pharmaceuticals =

American biotechnology company

- Industry: Biotechnology
- Founded: 1998; 27 years ago

KP-1461

Koronis Pharmaceuticals is a Seattle area biotechnology company founded in 1998. Koronis is dedicated to the development of antiviral therapeutics based on a novel mechanism, Viral Decay Acceleration (VDA). The Company's lead product candidate is KP-1461 for the treatment of human immunodeficiency virus (HIV) infection. The company also has products in development for the treatment of hepatitis C and RSV infection.
