= Blue Moon (Hamilton novel) =

1998 novel by Laurell K. Hamilton

- 1998 US cover
- Author: Laurell K. Hamilton
- Cover artist: Lee MacLeod (Ace edition)
- Language: English
- Series: Anita Blake: Vampire Hunter
- Genre: Horror, Mystery, Erotic novel
- Publisher: Ace Books (Ace edition)
- Publication date: 1998 (Ace edition)
- Publication place: United States
- Media type: Print (Paperback)
- Pages: 418 pp (Ace edition)
- ISBN: 0-441-00574-8 (Ace edition)
- OCLC: 40046087
- LC Class: CPB Box no. 1460 vol. 9
- Preceded by: Burnt Offerings
- Followed by: Obsidian Butterfly

Blue Moon is the eighth in the Anita Blake: Vampire Hunter series of horror/mystery/erotica novels by Laurell K. Hamilton.

== Plot ==
In the dark underbelly of St. Louis, the supernatural community is bracing for an unprecedented event in a Blue Moon.
