= Jean-Claude =

Jean-Claude is a French masculine given name. Notable people with the name include:

== People called Jean-Claude ==
- Jean-Claude Ades, an Italian electronic music producer
- Jean-Claude Alibert (died 2020), a French racing driver
- Jean-Claude Amiot (born 1939), a French composer, music professor and conductor
- Jean-Claude Andruet (born 1940), a French professional rally driver
- Jean-Claude Bajeux (1931–2011), a professor and director of the Ecumenical Center for Human Rights in Port-au-Prince, Haiti
- Jean-Claude Baker (1943–2015), a French-born American restaurateur
- Jean-Claude Barreau (1933–2025), a French essayist and writer
- Jean-Claude Bastos de Morais (born 1967), a Swiss entrepreneur with strong connections to Angola
- Jean-Claude Beaulieu (born 1944), a member of the National Assembly of France
- Jean-Claude Bergeron (born 1968), a retired Canadian ice hockey goaltender
- Jean-Claude Bernardet (1936–2025), Belgian-born Brazilian film theorist
- Jean-Claude Bertrand (born 1954), a retired French badminton player
- Jean-Claude Biver (born 1949), the CEO, board member and minority shareholder of Hublot
- Jean-Claude Blanc (born 1963), the former chairman of Juventus FC
- Jean-Claude Borelly (born 1953), a French trumpeter and composer
- Jean-Claude Bouchet (born 1957), a member of the National Assembly of France
- Jean-Claude Bouillaud (1927–2008), a French film and television actor
- Jean-Claude Boulard (1943–2018), a French politician
- Jean-Claude Bouttier (1944–2019), a French actor and former European boxing champion
- Jean-Claude Bras (born 1945), a French former professional football player
- Jean-Claude Brialy (1933–2007), a French actor
- Jean-Claude Briault (born 1947), a New Caledonian politician
- Jean-Claude Brisseau (1944–2019), a French filmmaker best known for his 2002 film Secret Things
- Jean-Claude Brou (born 1953), an Ivorian politician and economist
- Jean-Claude Cameroun (born 1973), a Cameroonian judoka
- Jean-Claude Carle (1948–2019), a member of the Senate of France
- Jean-Claude Carrière (1931–2021), a French screenwriter and actor
- Jean-Claude Castera (born 1939), a Haitian painter
- Jean-Claude Casties (born 1936), a French former professional football player
- Jean-Claude Chermann (born 1939), a French virologist
- Jean-Claude Colin (1790–1875), a French priest who became the founder of the Society of Mary
- Jean-Claude Colliard (1946–2014), a former member of the Constitutional Council of France
- Jean-Claude Colotti (born 1967), a French former professional road bicycle racer
- Jean-Claude D'Amours (born 1972), a Canadian politician
- Jean-Claude Danglot (born 1950), a member of the Senate of France
- Jean-Claude Darcheville (born 1975), a French football striker
- Jean-Claude Darouy (1944–2006), a French rower who competed in the 1964 Summer Olympics
- Jean-Claude Dassier (born 1941), the president of Olympique de Marseille
- Jean-Claude Decaux (1937–2016), a French entrepreneur who earned his fortune in advertising
- Jean-Claude Deret (1921–2016), French television writer, author, actor
- Jean-Claude Dreyfus (born 1946), a French actor
- Jean-Claude Drouot (born 1938), a Belgian actor
- Jean-Claude Dunyach (born 1957), a French science fiction writer
- Jean-Claude Duvalier (1951–2014), the ruler of Haiti from 1971 until his overthrow
- Jean-Claude Ellena (born 1947), a French perfumer
- Jean-Claude Éloy (1938–2025), a French classical composer
- Jean-Claude Etienne (1941–2017), a French politician and a member of the Senate of France
- Jean-Claude Fernandes (born 1972), former French footballer and manager
- Jean-Claude Flabel, an author of aerospace engineering textbooks
- Jean-Claude Flornoy (1950–2011), a French specialist of the Tarot of Marseille
- Jean-Claude Flory (born 1966), a member of the National Assembly of France
- Jean-Claude Forest (1930–1998), a writer and illustrator
- Jean-Claude Fournier (born 1943), a French cartoonist
- Jean-Claude Frécon (1944–2016), a member of the Senate of France
- Jean-Claude Fruteau (1947–2022), a French politician and Member of the European Parliament
- Jean-Claude Gakosso (born 1957), a Congolese politician
- Jean-Claude Garoute (1935–2006), a Haitian painter and sculptor
- Jean-Claude Gasigwa (1983-2015), Rwandan tennis player
- Jean-Claude Gaudin (1939–2024), a French politician
- Jean-Claude Gayssot (born 1944), a French politician
- Jean-Claude Gérard, a French flautist
- Jean-Claude Germain (1939–2025), a Canadian playwright, author, journalist and historian
- Jean-Claude Grumberg (born 1939), a French writer of children's books and a playwright
- Jean-Claude Guédon (born 1943), a Quebec-based academic educationist
- Jean-Claude Guibal (1941–2021), a member of the National Assembly of France
- Jean-Claude Guiguet (1948–2005), a French film director and screenwriter
- Jean-Claude Hamel (1929–2020), the President of AJ Auxerre from 1963 to 2009
- Jean-Claude Iranzi (born 1992), a Rwandan football player
- Jean-Claude Irvoas (1949–2005), a French employee of a street furniture firm
- Jean-Claude Izzo (1945–2000), a French poet, playwright, screenwriter and novelist
- Jean-Claude Juncker (born 1954), a Luxembourgian politician and President of the European Commission (2014–2019)
- Jean-Claude Kebabdjian (born 1942), a French-Armenian editor and journalist
- Jean-Claude Killy (born 1943), a French alpine ski racer
- Jean-Claude Labrecque (1938–2019), a Canadian director and cinematographer
- Jean-Claude La Marre (born 1967), a Haitian-American writer
- Jean-Claude Lamy (1941–2025), a French journalist, writer and publisher
- Jean-Claude Larréché (born 1947), the Alfred H. Heineken Chaired Professor of marketing at INSEAD
- Jean-Claude Latombe (born 1947), a French-American roboticist
- Jean-Claude Lattès, a French publishing house
- Jean-Claude Lauzon (1953–1997), a Canadian filmmaker
- Jean-Claude Lavaud (1938–2011), a retired French football player
- Jean-Claude Lebaube (1937–1977), a French cyclist
- Jean-Claude Lebensztejn, a French art historian and art critic
- Jean-Claude Leclercq (born 1962), a French former professional road bicycle racer
- Jean-Claude Lemoult (born 1960), a French former professional football player
- Jean-Claude Lenoir (born 1944), a contemporary member of the National Assembly of France
- Jean-Claude Leroy (born 1952), a member of the National Assembly of France
- Jean-Claude Leuyer (born 1970), an American kickboxer
- Jean-Claude Logé (born 1941), a Belgian businessman
- Jean-Claude Lorquet (born 1935), a professor of Theoretical Chemistry at the University of Liège
- Jean-Claude Lubtchansky (1930–2020), a French documentary and television director
- Jean-Claude Magnan (born 1941), a French fencer and Olympic champion in foil competition
- Jean-Claude Malépart (1938–1989), a French Canadian politician
- Jean-Claude Maleval (born 1946), a French Lacanian psychoanalyst
- Jean-Claude Malgoire (1940–2018), a French conductor
- Jean-Claude Marcourt (born 1956), the Belgian Minister of Economics and Employment
- Jean-Claude Martinez (born 1945), a French politician and Member of the European Parliament
- Jean-Claude Mathis (born 1939), a member of the National Assembly of France
- Jean-Claude Merceron (born 1942), a member of the Senate of France
- Jean-Claude Merlin (born 1954), a French astronomer
- Jean-Claude Mézières (1938–2022), a French comic strip artist and illustrator
- Jean-Claude Mignon (born 1950), a member of the National Assembly of France
- Jean-Claude Milner (born 1941), a French linguist, philosopher and essayist
- Jean-Claude Mpassy (born 1986), a German-Congolese football player
- Jean-Claude Mukanya (born 1968), a retired football player
- Jean-Claude Ndoli (born 1986), a Rwandan-born football player
- Jean-Claude Nicolas Forestier (1861–1930), a French landscape architect
- Jean-Claude Olry (born 1949), a French slalom canoer
- Jean-Claude Osman (born 1947), a French retired professional football defender
- Jean-Claude Pagal (born 1964), a former Cameroonian footballer
- Jean-Claude Panet (c. 1719–1778), a key figure in the 18th century community of Quebec
- Jean-Claude Parrot (born c. 1937), the National President of the Canadian Union of Postal Workers
- Jean-Claude Pascal (1927–1992), a French singer
- Jean-Claude Paye (born 1952), a Belgian sociologist
- Jean-Claude Pecker (1923–2020), a French astronomer, member of the Académie des sciences
- Jean-Claude Perez (born 1964), a French politician and member of the National Assembly
- Jean-Claude Petit (born 1943), a French composer and arranger
- Jean-Claude Peyronnet (born 1940), a member of the Senate of France
- Jean-Claude Pierre-Louis, the Chief Executive of Rodrigues island, Mauritius
- Jean-Claude Piumi (1940–1996), a French former football defender
- Jean-Claude Pressac (1944–2003), a French chemist and pharmacist
- Jean-Claude Rabbath (born 1977), a Lebanese high jumper
- Jean-Claude Rakotonirina, a Malagasy politician
- Jean-Claude Raphael (born 1973), a Mauritian judoka
- Jean-Claude Renard (1922–2002), a French poet
- Jean-Claude Richard (1727–1791), a French painter and engraver
- Jean-Claude Risset (1938–2016), a French composer
- Jean-Claude Rivest (born 1943), a Canadian lawyer, politician and Senator
- Jean-Claude Romand (born 1954), a French impostor and murderer who pretended to be a medical doctor
- Jean-Claude Rouget (born 1953), a French Thoroughbred horse trainer and former jockey
- Jean-Claude Rouzaud, the president of Champagne Louis Roederer
- Jean-Claude Rudaz (born 1942), a former racing driver from Switzerland
- Jean-Claude Saint-André (born 1962), a Quebec provincial politician
- Jean-Claude Sandrier (born 1945), a French politician and former mayor of Bourges
- Jean-Claude Scherrer (born 1978), a Swiss professional tennis player
- Jean-Claude Schindelholz (born 1940), a Swiss football striker
- Jean-Claude Schmitt (born 1946), a French medievalist
- Jean-Claude Scraire (born 1946), a Québécois lawyer, separatist and nationalist
- Jean-Claude Sebag (born 1943), a French politician and lawyer
- Jean-Claude Sensemat (born 1951), a French businessman
- Jean-Claude Siapa Ivouloungou (c. 1958–2012), a Congolese politician
- Jean-Claude Simon (born 1948), Vietnamese-French researcher in semiconductor optical amplifiers
- Jean-Claude Skrela (born 1949), a former coach of the French national rugby union team
- Jean-Claude Suares (1942–2013), an American designer of books, magazines and newspapers
- Jean-Claude Suaudeau (born 1938), a former French football player
- Jean-Claude Thomas (1950–2018), a member of the National Assembly of France
- Jean-Claude Tochon, a Swiss slalom canoer
- Jean-Claude Tremblay (1939–1994), a Canadian ice hockey defenceman
- Jean-Claude Trichet (born 1942), a French economist, former president of the European Central Bank
- Jean-Claude Turcotte (1936–2015), a Roman Catholic cardinal and Archbishop of Montréal
- Jean-Claude Usunier, a Professor of Marketing at HEC Lausanne, Switzerland
- Jean-Claude Van Cauwenberghe (born 1944), a Walloon politician
- Jean-Claude Van Damme (born 1960), a Belgian martial artist and actor
- Jean-Claude Van Geenberghe (1962–2009), a Belgian-Ukrainian equestrian
- Jean-Claude Vannier (born 1943), a French musician, composer and arranger
- Jean-Claude Viollet (born 1951), a member of the National Assembly of France
- Jean-Claude Vrinat (1936–2008), the owner of the Taillevent restaurant
- Jean-Claude Walter (1940–2025), a French poet and writer
- Jean-Claude Wicky (1946–2016), a Swiss photographer noted for his series on Bolivian miners
- Jean-Claude (Anita Blake: Vampire Hunter character), a fictional character in the Anita Blake: Vampire Hunter series of novels

== See also ==
- Jean Claude (1619–1687), a French theologian
- 84011 Jean-Claude, a main-belt asteroid
- JC (disambiguation)
