= Amiot =

Amiot (English: /ˈæmioʊ/, French: [amjo]) may refer to:

== People ==
- Félix Amiot (1894–1974), French aircraft designer and shipbuilder
- Jean Joseph Marie Amiot (1718–1793), French Jesuit missionary to China
- Jean-Claude Amiot (born 1939), French composer
- Mathieu Amiot (c. 1629–1688), Sieur de Villeneuve, interpreter and seigneur in New France
- Maurice Amiot (1932–1961), French soldier
- Paul Amiot (1886–1979), French actor
- Pierre Amiot (1781–1839), farmer, businessman and political figure in Lower Canada
- Amiot Métayer (died 2003), gang leader in Haiti

== Other ==
- Avions Amiot, the aviation company named for Félix Amiot, and the products of this company including:
  - The Amiot 110
  - The Amiot 120 series
  - The Amiot 143
  - The Amiot 354
- Amiot (car manufacturer), French car manufacturer

== See also ==
- Amyot
