= Rakotonirina =

Rakotonirina is a Malagasy surname.

== People ==
- Manandafy Rakotonirina (1938–2019), Malagasy politician
- Jean-Claude Rakotonirina, Malagasy politician
- Harijaona Lovanantenaina Rakotonirina, Malagasy politician
- Joe Ernest Rakotonirina, Malagasy politician
