= Ansaloni =

Ansaloni is a surname. Notable people with the surname include:

- Giordano Ansaloni (1598–1634), Italian explorer and trader
- Pablo Ansaloni (born 1971), Argentine trade unionist and politician
- Vincenzo Ansaloni (died 1615), Italian painter

== See also ==
- Ulmus pumila 'Ansaloni', Siberian Elm cultivar
- Ponsard-Ansaloni, power conversion device
