= Frau und Hund =

German magazine on art, poetry and politics

Frau und Hund ("Woman and Dog") is a German magazine of art, poetry and related subjects, including politics, published thrice yearly by painter Markus Lüpertz and edited by writer G.H. Holländer. The subtitle "Zeitschrift für kursives Denken" ("Journal of Diagonal Thinking") plays on the German term for italics ("kursiv") and the German equivalent of (dis)course, Kurs as opposed to Diskurs.

The magazine was first published in 2003 on occasion of the ART BASEL and distributed to visitors of the fair; a supplement entirely published in Italian was presented at the German Academy of Villa Massimo, Rome, on 1 April 2004, while a similar French version was presented at the Centre Pompidou, Paris, on 29 November 2006. Overall, ten regular issues have been published until the beginning of 2007.

== Featured authors ==
- Frank Stella
- Brenton Broadstock
- Moni Ovadia
- Valentino Zeichen
- Piero Falchetta
- Jean-Claude Lebensztejn
- Benoît Gréan
- Jean Marois
- Anouk Jevtić
- László Krasznahorkai
- Yuri Averbakh
- Zlatko Krasni
- Heinrich Steinfest
- Durs Grünbein
- Daniel Spoerri
- Jörg Immendorff

There are hardly any reviews of periodicals in the German press. The magazine was, however, reviewed twice by the Frankfurter Allgemeine Zeitung, once in 2004 and once in 2006. Die Welt published an extract from issue 8, accompanied by a short characterization of the reviews aims, in November 2006.
