= Economic evaluation of time =

Perceiving time in terms of money

In organizational behavior and psychology, Economic evaluation of time refers to perceiving of time in terms of money. (Other forms of evaluation of time are concerned with costs and benefits to the general community of changes in time-dependent activities.)

When a person evaluates their time in monetary terms, time is viewed as a scarce resource that should be used as efficiently as possible to maximize the perceived monetary gains. Therefore, people who evaluate their time in terms of money are more likely to trade their time for money (i.e., workers provide their time to organizations in exchange for money)—as illustrated by research examining time and money trade-offs.

Trading time for money is revealed through people's time use decisions. Across both mundane and major life decisions, people who evaluate their time in terms of money tend to spend their time in ways that give them more money at the expense of acquiring more time (e.g., driving to a cheaper, yet farther away gas station). Research found that, across these decisions, choosing to get more money at the expense of getting more time is associated with lower subjective well-being.

Furthermore, the activation of economic evaluation of time has primarily been studied in organizational behavior research with hourly payment schedules and performance incentives, which are robust predictors of economic evaluation of time. The psychological effects of receiving hourly payment and performance incentives promote the economic evaluations of time, and in turn lead employees to spend their time in ways that maximize personal success and economic gains, such as working more hours, socializing less with loved ones, and volunteering less.

== Time and Money ==
=== Time is money ===
The idea that time can be evaluated in monetary terms was first introduced by Benjamin Franklin in his 1748 essay Advice to a Young Tradesman. His famous adage 'time is money', that appeared in this essay, was intended to convey that wasting time in frivolous pursuits results in lost money. He believed that wasting time wasted money in two ways. First, by not earning money. Second, by spending money during non-working time.

A great number of researchers argue that this aphorism is true in Western societies. Jean-Claude Usunier noted that "the United States is quite emblematic of the 'time is money' cultures, where time is an economic good. Since time is a scarce resource, or at least perceived as such, people should try to reach its optimal allocation, between competing ways of using it." Consistent with this line of thought, literature on economic evaluation of time views that people can treat time and money in similar ways (and they are tradeable) in certain contexts. Specifically, organizational practices, such as hourly payment schedules and exposure to the concept of 'money', are significant activators of economic evaluation of time.

=== Differences in time and money ===
However, a different line of research provides contrasting arguments by showing that people evaluate time and money very differently. In particular, money has a readily exchangeable market where people can buy, sell, borrow, and save, which is impossible to do with time. A lost dollar has potential to be earned back tomorrow, yet a lost minute cannot be recouped.

In a study done by LeClerc, Schmitt, and Dube, people were more risk-averse to uncertainties that involved losses of time compared to money (whereas, according to prospect theory, people are risk-seeking under decisions that involve losses of money). For example, people were less likely to choose to wait 90 minutes over 60 minutes for sure than they were to choose the chance of losing $15 over $10 for sure. Okada and Hoch also found systematic differences in how people spent time versus money, and these differences in spending patterns. In organizational behavior and psychology, Economic evaluation of time refers to perceiving of time in terms of money. (Other forms of evaluation of time are concerned with costs and benefits to the general community of changes in time-dependent activities.)

When a person evaluates their time in monetary terms, time is viewed as a scarce resource that should be used as efficiently as possible to maximize the perceived monetary gains. Therefore, people who evaluate their time in terms of money are more likely to trade their time for money (i.e., workers provide their time to organizations in exchange for money)—as illustrated by research examining time and money trade-offs.

Trading time for money is revealed through people's time use decisions. Across both mundane and major life decisions, people who evaluate their time in terms of money tend to spend their time in ways that give them more money at the expense of acquiring more time (e.g., driving to a cheaper, yet farther away gas station). Research found that, across these decisions, choosing to get more money at the expense of getting more time is associated with lower subjective well-being.

Furthermore, the activation of economic evaluation of time has primarily been studied in the organizational behavior research with hourly payment schedules and performance incentives, which are robust predictors of economic evaluation of time. The psychological effects of receiving hourly payment and performance incentives promote the economic evaluations of time, and in turn lead employees to spend their time in ways that maximize personal success and economic gains, such as working more hours, socializing less with loved ones, and volunteering less.

== Factors that Promote Economic Evaluation of Time ==
=== Money ===
Research looking at the relationship between time and money found that activating the concept of money can heighten people's focus on the goal of maximizing economic gains. Thinking about their time in terms of money (economic evaluation of time), subsequently impacts people's decisions about time-use and attitude toward others (see 'Consequences' section). The focus on money can be induced in laboratory settings, as well as in organizational contexts, such as under hourly payment schedules and performance incentives, which are explained in detail below.

==== Laboratory tasks ====
People can be primed to think about money through simple laboratory procedures. Studies found that people who were asked to formulate sentences using money-relevant words (e.g., price) versus time-relevant words (e.g., clock) primed people to think about money, and they became more self-focused in their decisions about time use. For example, participants who were primed to think about money spent more time working and less time socializing with friends. They were also far less likely to help others or seek help. There are various other manipulation techniques used to prime the concept of money. The 'descrambling task' consists of 30 sets of five jumbled words, where participants are asked to formulate sensible phrases using four of the five words. In the control conditions, all 30 of the phrases primed neutral concepts (e.g., “cold it desk outside is” descrambled to “it is cold outside”). In the money-prime condition, 15 of the phrases primed the concept of money (e.g., “high a salary desk paying” descrambled to “a high-paying salary”). Other studies presented participants with money bills versus paper sheets to prime the concept of money.

However, some of the recent studies in the money-priming research failed to replicate these results. Across several experiments, the same manipulation (e.g., showing an image of a $100 bill) did reliably activate the concept of money; however, it did not have consistent effects on several dependent measures including subjective wealth, self-sufficiency, agency, and communion, which are theorized to be influenced by the thought of money. Furthermore, socioeconomic factors such as gender, socioeconomic status, and political ideology did not moderate these effects of money primes. Since variance in study population and methods are inevitable across experiments, these laboratory studies should therefore be interpreted with caution. Caruso and his colleagues suggest that using large-scale pre-registered experiment and assessing wide-ranging individual factors within the same heterogeneous sample will be helpful in identifying meaningful variations among the dependent variables.

=== Performance incentive ===
The research found that certain organizational practices promote economic evaluation of time. One such factor is performance incentives, a ubiquitous payment system used in various domains including education, health, and management. The main alternative to performance incentives is task-based incentive (also known as fixed incentive)—a fixed amount of payment for completing a task. Performance incentives, as compared to task-based incentives, increase people's attention to reward objects, which in turn heighten their desire for money. This desire then motivates people's focus on earning monetary and material rewards, and decreases prosocial spending like making donations.

=== Hourly payment ===
One of the most salient features in organizations that induce the economic evaluation of time is hourly pay, a type of payment schedule that approximately 58% of employees work under in the United States. Time and money connection is particularly salient under hourly payment because people's income is a direct function of the number of hours they worked, multiplied by their rate of pay. Sanford DeVoe and Jeffery Pfeffer found that workers who were paid by the hour showed more similarity in how they evaluated time and money, as compared to workers who were paid by salary. Specifically, people who were paid by the hour (vs. salary) applied mental accounting rules to time that are typically only applied to money. Participants were asked to rate their endorsement on a mental accounting questionnaire (e.g., "If I have wasted money [time] on a particular activity or item, I try to save it on another activity or item."), where DeVoe and Pfeffer found that hourly wage participants showed high similarity in how they applied mental accounting rules to both time and money, whereas salaried participants did not apply mental accounting rules to time.

Furthermore, research looking at the economic evaluation of time proved that 'economic mindset' can be induced in laboratory settings through hourly wage calculations. Although not everyone is paid by the hour, every worker has an implicit hourly wage—their total income divided by the number of hours they worked. Therefore, participants who calculated their hourly wage in an experiment versus who did not calculate their hourly wage were more likely to adopt an economic mindset and were more willing to trade their time for money.

DeVoe and Pfeffer also showed that the mechanism for how hourly wage payment activates economic evaluation of time is the people's viewing of themselves as the economic evaluator in their decision-making. This suggests that the mere activation of an economic concept, such as hourly wage in general or of another person, itself cannot activate economic evaluation of time. Rather, a person's own prior experience with hourly payment or calculating one's own hourly wage (vs. another person's hourly wage) is what activates the economic evaluation. Therefore, the degree to which hourly payment impacts an individual's attitudes and behaviors depends on the extent to which the economic evaluation becomes more central to one's self-concept.

== Consequences ==
=== Devaluing non-compensated time ===
Economic evaluation of time impacts people's decisions about time use. A salient outcome for adopting an economic mindset, or thinking about time in terms of money, is devaluing of non-compensated time. Results from a survey of nationally representative sample of Americans from the May 2001 Current Population Survey (CPS) Work Schedule Supplement showed that people who were paid by the hour, compared to those not paid by the hour, weighed the monetary returns more strongly when making decisions about time use. Therefore, they showed greater willingness to give up their free time to earn more money ("Work more hours but earn more money" vs. "Work fewer hours but earn less money"). Another study demonstrated that technical contractors who sold their services by the hour came to evaluate their time in terms of money, which led the contractors to devalue non-compensated time (e.g., volunteering). These non-compensated time use domains are discussed below.

==== Volunteering ====
People who are paid by the hour (vs. salary) volunteer less. In the laboratory, participants who calculated their hourly wage (vs. those who did not calculate their hourly wage), volunteered less and also reported that they are less willing to volunteer their time.

==== Pro-environmental behavior ====
were explained by the ambiguity in the value of time in contrast to money that was perceived as more fungible. For example, people believed that they will have more time in the future than now (which leads to greater slack and procrastination), yet people did not overestimate the amount of money they will have in the future than now.

Time and money also differ in their connections to people's self-concepts. People perceive that their temporal expenditures, such as spending leisure time, are more reflective of their self-concept, as compared to their monetary expenditures. For instance, Reed and his colleagues found that people view donations of time (e.g., volunteering) as higher in moral value and more self-expressive than monetary donations. Similarly, Carter and Gilovich found that people’s experiences are more critical to their personal narrative than material goods. Therefore, although people do express aspects of their self-identity through purchasing of material goods as well, expenditures of time may constitute people’s lives more strongly. Together, the fact that people can view their time in terms of money may not be true across all contexts.

== Factors that Promote Economic Evaluation of Time ==
=== Money ===
Research looking at the relationship between time and money found that activating the concept of money can heighten people's focus on the goal of maximizing economic gains. Thinking about their time in terms of money (economic evaluation of time), subsequently impacts people's decisions about time-use and attitude toward others (see 'Consequences' section). The focus on money can be induced in laboratory settings, as well as in organizational contexts, such as under hourly payment schedules and performance incentives, which are explained in detail below.

==== Laboratory tasks ====
People can be primed to think about money through simple laboratory procedures. Studies found that people who were asked to formulate sentences using money-relevant words (e.g., price) versus time-relevant words (e.g., clock) primed people to think about money, and they became more self-focused in their decisions about time use. For example, participants who were primed to think about money spent more time working and less time socializing with friends. They were also far less likely to help others or seek help. There are various other manipulation techniques used to prime the concept of money. The 'descrambling task' consists of 30 sets of five jumbled words, where participants are asked to formulate sensible phrases using four of the five words. In the control conditions, all 30 of the phrases primed neutral concepts (e.g., “cold it desk outside is” descrambled to “it is cold outside”). In the money-prime condition, 15 of the phrases primed the concept of money (e.g., “high a salary desk paying” descrambled to “a high-paying salary”). Other studies presented participants with money bills versus paper sheets to prime the concept of money.

However, some of recent studies in the money-priming research failed to replicate these results. Across several experiments, the same manipulation (e.g., showing an image of a $100 bill) did reliably activate the concept of money; however, it did not have consistent effects on several dependent measures including subjective wealth, self-sufficiency, agency, and communion, which are theorized to be influenced by the thought of money. Furthermore, socioeconomic factors such as gender, socioeconomic status, and political ideology did not moderate these effects of money primes. Since variance in study population and methods are inevitable across experiments, these laboratory studies should therefore be interpreted with caution. Caruso and his colleagues suggest that using large-scale pre-registered experiment and assessing wide-ranging individual factors within the same heterogeneous sample will be helpful in identifying meaningful variations among the dependent variables.

=== Performance incentive ===
Research found that certain organizational practices promote economic evaluation of time. One such factor is performance incentives, a ubiquitous payment system used in various domains including education, health, and management. The main alternative to performance incentives is task-based incentive (also known as fixed incentive)—a fixed amount of payment for completing a task. Performance incentives, as compared to task-based incentives, increase people's attention to reward objects, which in turn heighten their desire for money. This desire then motivates people's focus on earning monetary and material rewards, and decreases prosocial spending like making donations.

=== Hourly payment ===
One of the most salient features in organizations that induce the economic evaluation of time is hourly pay, a type of payment schedule that approximately 58% of employees work under in the United States. Time and money connection is particularly salient under hourly payment because people's income is a direct function of the number of hours they worked, multiplied by their rate of pay. Sanford DeVoe and Jeffery Pfeffer found that workers who were paid by the hour showed more similarity in how they evaluated time and money, as compared to workers who were paid by salary. Specifically, people who were paid by the hour (vs. salary) applied mental accounting rules to time that are typically only applied to money. Participants were asked to rate their endorsement on a mental accounting questionnaire (e.g., "If I have wasted money [time] on a particular activity or item, I try to save it on another activity or item."), where DeVoe and Pfeffer found that hourly wage participants showed high similarity in how they applied mental accounting rules to both time and money, whereas salaried participants did not apply mental accounting rules to time.

Furthermore, research looking at the economic evaluation of time proved that an 'economic mindset' can be induced in laboratory settings through hourly wage calculations. Although not everyone is paid by the hour, every worker has an implicit hourly wage—their total income divided by the number of hours they work. Therefore, participants who calculated their hourly wage in an experiment versus those who did not calculate their hourly wage were more likely to adopt an economic mindset and were more willing to trade their time for money.

DeVoe and Pfeffer also showed that the mechanism for how hourly wage payment activates economic evaluation of time is the people's viewing of themselves as the economic evaluator in their decision-making. This suggests that the mere activation of an economic concept, such as hourly wage in general or of another person, itself cannot activate the economic evaluation of time. Rather, a person's own prior experience with hourly payment or calculating one's own hourly wage (vs. another person's hourly wage) is what activates the economic evaluation. Therefore, the degree to which hourly payment impacts an individual's attitudes and behaviors depends on the extent to which the economic evaluation becomes more central to one's self-concept.

== Consequences ==
=== Devaluing non-compensated time ===
Economic evaluation of time impacts people's decisions about time use. A salient outcome for adopting an economic mindset, or thinking about time in terms of money, is devaluing of non-compensated time. Results from a survey of nationally representative sample of Americans from the May 2001 Current Population Survey (CPS) Work Schedule Supplement showed that people who were paid by the hour, compared to those not paid by the hour, weighed the monetary returns more strongly when making decisions about time use. Therefore, they showed greater willingness to give up their free time to earn more money ("Work more hours but earn more money" vs. "Work fewer hours but earn less money"). Another study demonstrated that technical contractors who sold their services by the hour came to evaluate their time in terms of money, which led the contractors to devalue non-compensated time (e.g., volunteering). These non-compensated time use domains are discussed below.

==== Volunteering ====
People who are paid by the hour (vs. salary) volunteer less. In the laboratory, participants who calculated their hourly wage (vs. those who did not calculate their hourly wage), volunteered less and also reported that they are less willing to volunteer their time.

==== Pro-environmental behavior ====
People who are paid by the hour are less likely to engage in pro-environmental behaviors, such as recycling. Simply asking participants to calculate their hourly wage lowered their willingness to engage in environmental behaviors as well as their actual behaviors in recycling scrap papers in a laboratory experiment. This is due to the hourly participants' spontaneous recognition of the trade-offs they are making with every minute of their time. People feel as if they are losing money when engaging in environmental activities because these are non-compensated.

==== Social interaction ====
Economic evaluation of time undermines social interactions. Thinking about money increases people's willingness to work and reduces their willingness to spend time with others. In an experiment done by Cassie Mogilner, participants who thought about money-related words (e.g., price), compared to participants who thought about time-related words (e.g., clock), were significantly more likely to spend time working more and socializing less with loved ones. As such, people who are focused on money are less interpersonally attuned—they are less caring and warm and rather in a business mindset.

=== Well-being ===
Economic evaluation of time has multiple negative implications for well-being. Economic evaluation of time activates the human motivation system that is associated with self-focused values. People with an economic mindset therefore tend to prioritize personal achievement more than the wellbeing of others and spend time in ways that maximize personal gains. This tendency negatively contributes to well-being.

First, evaluating time in terms of money motivates people to work more because every hour they put into non-compensated activities is lost money. Although this may be useful when trying to meet a short deadline at work, work time does not typically translate into happiness. However, spending time with loved ones, such as family and friends, spending time volunteering, and engaging in pro-environmental behaviors have been found to contribute to greater happiness. Daniel Kahneman also demonstrated that being prosocial and socializing with friends are known to be the happiest part of most people's days. Economic evaluation of time that decreases these happiness-promoting activities may therefore have grave consequences on well-being.
