= Benoît Gréan =

French poet

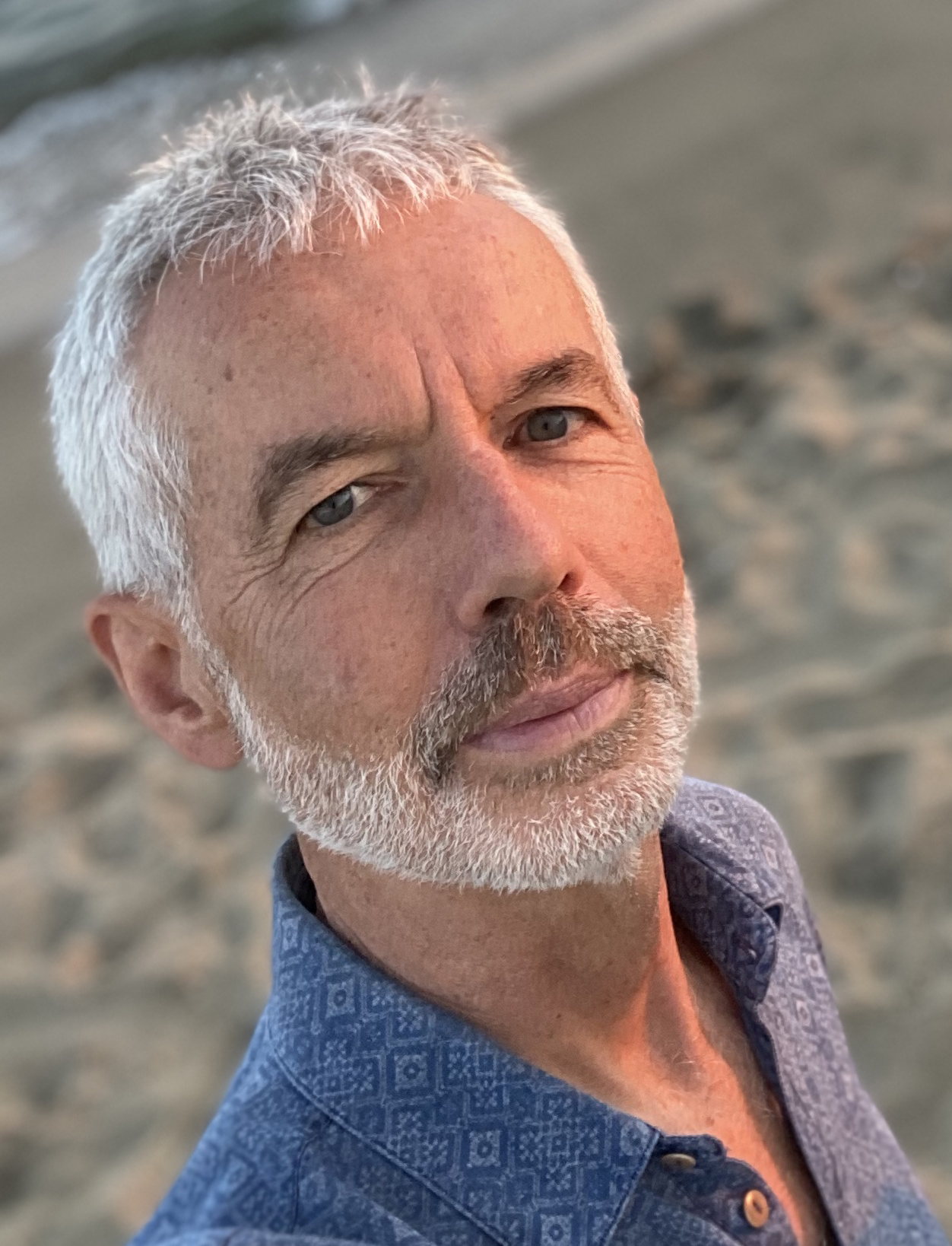
- Gréan on the beach, 2020

Benoît Gréan (born in Strasbourg, 1957) is a French poet. He moved to New York City in the mid-1980s, and then settled in Rome.

Gréan has published fourteen volumes of poetry in French. Several of his works have been translated and published into German, Greek, Italian and English. In Germany, Hochroth has published him bilingually and he was a contributor to several issues of the German painter Markus Lüpertz's Frau und Hund. His volume Monstres tièdes has been translated by Massimo Sannelli and published in a bilingual Italian edition as Mostri tiepidi with a preface by Valerio Magrelli. A Greek translation, Chliara terata by Efi Hatziforou, has been published.

Fascinated by lapidary or fragmentary form, from Martial to Sappho, he is equally intrigued by the explorations of contemporary music.

Mai and Monstres tièdes are generally linked to Mediterranean life, whereas PSB 24 (Petite suite blieuxoise en 24 heures) and PSA 14 (Petite suite attique en 14 pauses) are anchored in specific sites, respectively, of Haute-Provence, France, and ancient and modern Greece. corps et riens, Extinctions and Successions should be read as a trilogy (the second title refers to Thomas Bernhard).

Gréan has also enjoyed collaborating with artists. 80 is an artist's book with a lithograph by Luisa Gardini, an Italian artist who also contributed to Mai, Monstres tièdes, corps et riens, Successions, à, Rideau and Sonnets des satiétés; Gardini also turned Monstres tièdes into a book of her own, WPMT15, published by cythère critique in 2005 (ISBN 978-88-901696-2-5), as well as a series of bookmarks published by Ecbolade in 2004, and a poster stamped by atelier de l'agneau in 2003. Works by the French painter Caroline Coppey appear in PSA 14 and Extinctions, and Bleu jour is based on the work of the same artist. The poems Gréan has addressed to the general work of Luisa Gardini, Caroline Coppey and Giorgio Bevignani are in à.

The composer Valerio Sannicandro based his Corps/Riens on corps et riens, which was first performed in Kyoto on November 13, 2015. Other composers such as Michèle Reverdy, Pierre Strauch, Gilles Schuehmacher, Fausto Sebastiani worked on his poetry.

Some poems have been published in various magazines as PO&SIE, Poésie 2000, Le Mâche-Laurier, Noniouze, Décharge, Marge 707, Moriturus, Le frisson esthétique, Hapax, l'intranquille and larevue* in France, Calendrier de la poésie francophone and MIDI in Belgium, RBL (Revue de Belles-Lettres) in Switzerland, Exit in Canada, Pagine, Offerta Speciale, BINA, SUD and Nuovi Argomenti in Italy, Nea Hestia in Greece, Artic, Frau und Hund and hochroth in Germany, Wespennest in Austria, Sentinel Literary Quarterly in Great Britain, The Brooklyn Rail and World Poetry Review in the USA.

As a translator, he helps to broaden familiarity in French among French speakers with Italian poets such as Mariangela Guatteri, Guido Mazzoni, Marco Caporali, Sacha Piersanti., Alessandro Anil, Irene Santori.

== Bibliography ==
- Mai, atelier de l'agneau, 2001 (ISBN 978-2-930188-39-3)
- Monstres tièdes, atelier de l'agneau, 2003 (ISBN 978-2-930188-65-2), Mostri tiepidi, empirìa, 2013 (ISBN 978-88-96218-44-0), Chliara terata, endymion, 2014 (ISBN 978-9-6095453-0-3)
- corps et riens, atelier de l'agneau, 2006 (ISBN 978-2-930188-89-8)
- 80, cythère critique, 2009 (ISBN 978-8-890169-62-5)
- PSB 24, alidades, 2010 (ISBN 978-2-906266-98-8)
- PSA 14, hochroth, 2011 (ISBN 978-3-942161-11-4)
- Extinctions, hochroth, 2012 (ISBN 978-3-902871-13-8)
- Successions, alidades, 2013 (ISBN 978-2-919376-18-6)
- Bleu jour, les lieux dits, 2014, 2Rives series, with Caroline Coppey (ISBN 978-2-918113-21-8)
- à, alidades, 2015 (ISBN 978-2-919376-37-7)
- Rideau, les lieux dits, 2020 Bandes d'artistes series, artist's book with Luisa Gardini
- Sonnets des satiétés, rhuthmos, 2020 (ISBN 979-10-95155-24-9)
- Petite messe solennelle, julien nègre, 2023, Partition series, with Luisa Gardini (ISBN 979-10-92464-65-8)
- Terre à mer, alidades, 2023 (ISBN 978-2-494935-00-6)

== See also ==
- List of French-language poets
