= Amyot =

Amyot (English: /ˈæmioʊ/ or /ˈæmiət/, French: [amjo]) is a surname, and may refer to:

People:

- Charles Jean-Baptiste Amyot (1799–1866), French lawyer and entomologist
- Frank Amyot (1904–1962), Canadian Olympic gold medalist in Canoe racing
- Geneviève Amyot (1945–2000), Franco-Canadian poet and novelist
- Jacques Amyot (1513–1593), French Renaissance writer and translator, Bishop of Auxerre
- Mathieu Amyot (ca. 1629–1688), Sieur de Villeneuve, interpreter and seigneur in New France

Places:

- Amyot, Ontario, a small community in Algoma District, Ontario, Canada

== See also ==
- Amiot (disambiguation)
