= Jean-Claude Paye =

Jean-Claude Paye may refer to:

- Jean-Claude Paye (sociologist) (born 1952), Belgian sociologist
- Jean-Claude Paye (civil servant) (born 1934), French civil servant, Secretary-General of the OECD
