= Durs Grünbein =

German poet and essayist (born 1962)

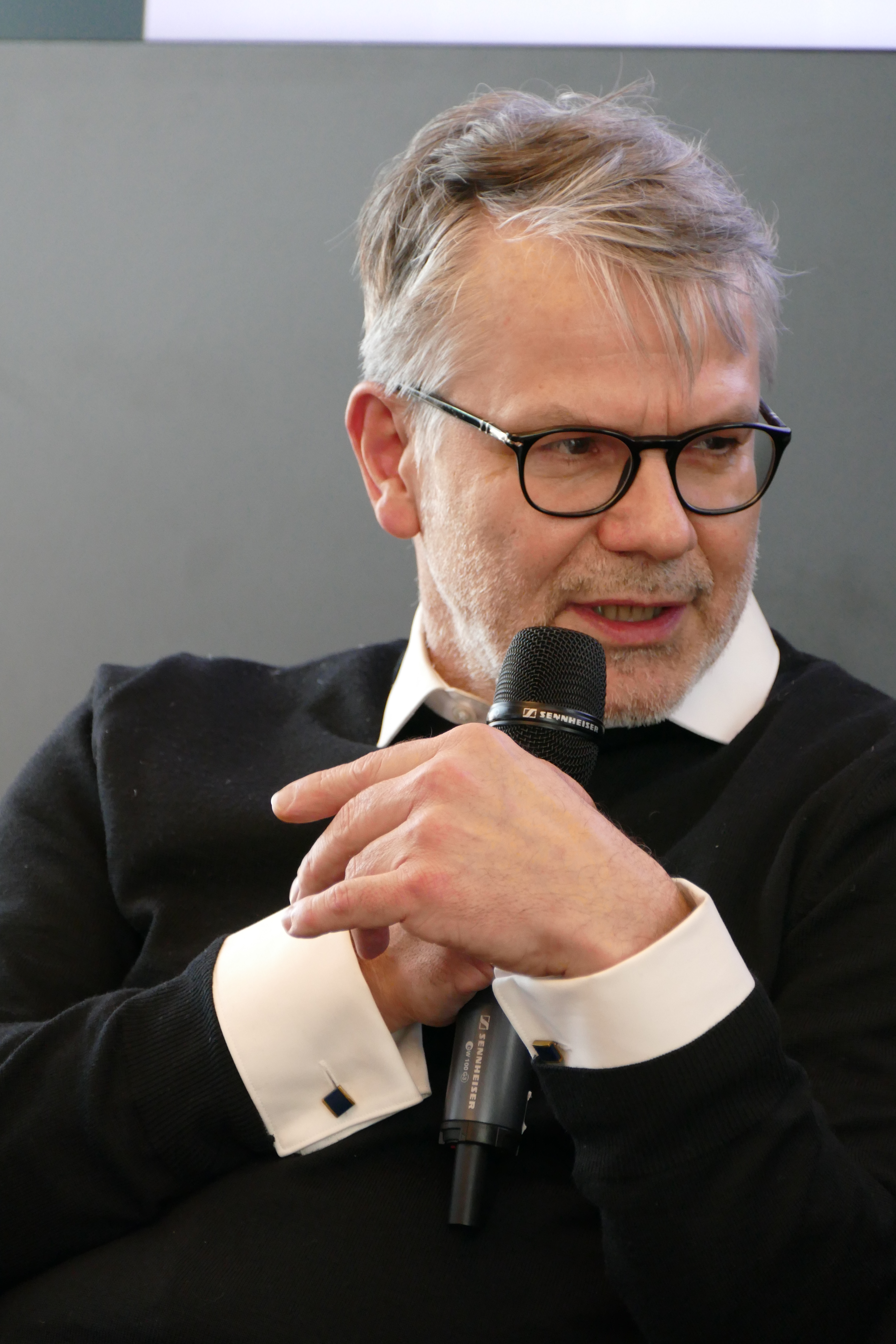
- Grünbein in Frankfurt (2019)
- Born: 9 October 1962 (age 63); Dresden, East Germany
- Occupations: Poet, essayist
- Writing career
- Notable awards: Georg Büchner Prize; Pour le Mérite (civil class); Zbigniew Herbert Award

Durs Grünbein (born 9 October 1962) is a German poet and essayist.

== Life and career ==
Durs Grünbein was born in Dresden in 1962 and grew up there. He studied Theater Studies in East Berlin, to which he moved in 1985.

Since the Peaceful Revolution nonviolently toppled the Berlin Wall and Communism in the German Democratic Republic in 1989, Grünbein has traveled widely in Europe, South-West Asia, and North America, and sojourned in various places, including Amsterdam, Paris, London, Vienna, Toronto, Los Angeles, New York City, and St. Louis. He lives in Berlin and, since 2013, in Rome.

His production comprises numerous collections of poetry and prose—essays, short narrative-reflexive prose, aphorisms, fragments, diary annotations and philosophical meditations—as well as three librettos for opera. He has translated classic texts from Aeschylus and Seneca, and a variety of authors, including John Ashbery, Samuel Beckett, Wallace Stevens, Henri Michaux, and Tomas Venclova.

Grünbein's 2005 poetry book Porcelain: Poem on the Downfall of My City and 2023 novel Der Komet are personal works about the city of Dresden and its destruction in indiscriminate Allied bombing in 1945.

His works have been translated into many languages, including Russian, Italian, English, French, Spanish, Swedish, and Japanese. His book Ashes for Breakfast: Selected Poems, translated by Michael Hoffmann, was shortlisted for the Griffin Poetry Prize in 2006.

Grünbein was awarded numerous national and international awards, including the Georg Büchner Prize (Germany's most prestigious literary recognition, which he received in 1995, aged thirty-three), the Friedrich Nietzsche Prize, the Friedrich Hölderlin Prize, the Berlin Literature Prize, the Premio Internazionale di Poesia Pier Paolo Pasolini and the Tranströmer Prize.

Grünbein holds the Chair of Poetik und künstlerische Ästhetik (Poetics and Artistic Aesthetics) at the Kunstakademie of Düsseldorf. In 2009, he was awarded the Order Pour le Mérite for Sciences and Arts as well as the Knights Commander of the Order of Merit of the Federal Republic of Germany. He is a member of various Academies of Arts and Sciences, including the Deutsche Akademie für Sprache und Dichtung, the Academy of Arts, Berlin, and the Sächsische Akademie der Künste, Dresden.

In 1997, he was a Fellow at the Villa Aurora in Los Angeles. In 2005, he held the position of Max Kade Distinguished Visiting Professor at Dartmouth College in New Hampshire, US. Since 2006, Grünbein is a visiting professor at the Kunstakademie Düsseldorf and at the European Graduate School in Saas-Fee, Switzerland. In 2009, he was a poet in residence at the Villa Massimo in Rome.

He has been a regular contributor to Frau und Hund – Zeitschrift für kursives Denken, edited by the academy's rector, the painter Markus Lüpertz.

Grünbein's third opera, Die Weiden, had its premiere on 8 December 2018 at Wiener Staatsoper, which commissioned the opera from Austrian composer Johannes Maria Staud and Grünbein. Following Berenice in 2004 for the Munich Biennale and Die Antilope in 2014 for Lucerne Festival, Die Weiden is the third opera Grünbein has written in collaboration with Staud. Staud and Grünbein received a couple of boos at the premiere.

In 2025, Karen Leeder was awarded the Griffin Poetry Prize for her translation of Grünbein’s collection Psyche Running: Selected Poems 2005-2022.

=== Critical reception ===
Since the publication of his first collection of poems in 1988, Durs Grünbein has emerged as "Germany's most prolific, versatile, successful and internationally renowned contemporary poet and essayist", a "poet of world significance" and one of "the key figures shaping the contemporary scene", alongside, for instance, Ulrike Draesner, Raul Schrott, and Marcel Beyer.

Conceiving poetry as a means of memorial, historical, and aesthetic exploration, Grünbein arguably, draws not only on his biography, but on a deep sense of history and far-ranging erudition to produce sardonic poems and essays, bristling with unusual perceptions and inventive expressions".

Whereas the intersection of literature and science, aesthetics and evolution, as well as the poetic elaboration of the existential experience in the GDR were the main focus of the critically acclaimed first collections of poetry, Grauzone morgens (1988), Schädelbasislektion (1991), Falten und Fallen (1994), since the middle 1990s, and especially since the collection Nach den Satiren (1999), classical antiquity figures prominently in Grünbein's poems and essays.

"As in his poetry, in his essays, too", observes Michael Eskin, "Grünbein succeeds in artfully interweaving autobiography and memoir with a host of broader concerns ranging from questions of history, science, and medicine, to question of ethics, aesthetics, and politics, with special attention to the continued relevance of the past – Greek and roman antiquity in particular – in and to the contemporary world, as well as the inevitable interpretive malleability of the past in the light of our ever-evolving present".

The poet's dialogue with the ancient legacy is more complex even than his own reflection suggests and most scholars assume. Besides interviewing past and present, some poems also engage with the gap between the past and its poetic figuration.

Grünbein's works on Descartes' philosophy and its significance for the poetic subjectivity have been praised by prominent critics and thinkers for their depth and remarkable style, "one capable of conducting powerful and original thought with no loss of lyric intensity", notices Don Paterson.

George Steiner's opus magnum The Poetry of Thought (2011) is dedicated to "Durs Grünbein, poet and Cartesian".

== Honors ==
- 1989: Wolfgang Weyrauch Prize
- 1992: Bremer Literaturförderpreis
- 1992: Marburger Literaturpreis
- 1993: Nicolas-Born-Preis für Lyrik
- 1995: Peter Huchel Prize
- 1995: Georg Büchner Prize
- 2001: Spycher: Literaturpreis Leuk
- 2004: Friedrich Nietzsche Prize
- 2005: Friedrich-Hölderlin-Preis der Stadt Bad Homburg
- 2006: Berliner Literaturpreis
- 2006: Premio Internazionale Pier Paolo Pasolini Roma
- 2008: Pour le Mérite für Wissenschaft und Künste
- 2009/2010: Frankfurter Poetik-Dozentur
- 2009: Knights Commander of the Order of Merit of the Federal Republic of Germany
- 2009: Samuel-Bogumil-Linde-Preis
- 2009: Stipendium der Deutschen Akademie Rom Villa Massimo
- 2012: Tomas-Tranströmer-Preis der schwedischen Stadt Västerås
- 2019: Premio Internazionale di Poesia – Centro di Poesia Contemporanea dell'Università di Bologna
- 2020: Zbigniew Herbert International Literary Award
- 2026: Erich-Loest-Preis

== Work ==
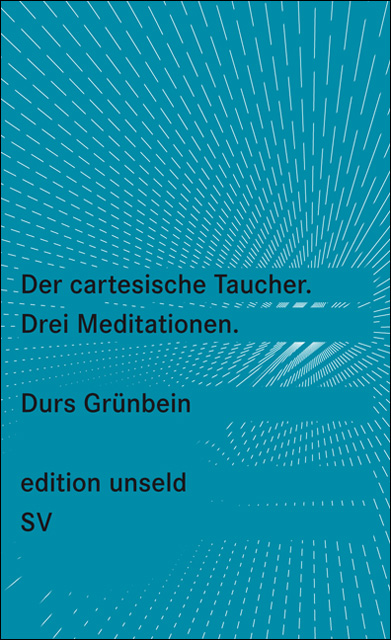
Cover of Grünbein's 2008 poetry book Der cartesische Taucher.

=== Poetry ===
- Grauzone morgens (1988), ISBN 3-518-13330-6
- Schädelbasislektion (1991), ISBN 3-518-40375-3
- Falten und Fallen (1994), ISBN 3-518-40570-5
- Den teuren Toten (1994), ISBN 3-518-40629-9
- Nach den Satiren (1999), ISBN 3-518-41028-8
- Erklärte Nacht (2002), ISBN 3-518-41305-8
- Vom Schnee oder Descartes in Deutschland (2003), ISBN 3-518-41455-0
- An Seneca. Postskriptum. Die Kürze des Lebens (2004)
- Der Misanthrop auf Capri (2005), ISBN 3-518-22394-1
- Porzellan. Poem vom Untergang meiner Stadt (2005), ISBN 3-518-41722-3
- Strophen für Übermorgen (2007), ISBN 3-518-41908-0
- Liebesgedichte (2008)
- Lob des Taifuns. Reisetagebücher in Haikus (2008)
- Der cartesische Taucher. Drei Meditationen. Suhrkamp Verlag, Frankfurt am Main 2008, ISBN 978-3-518-26007-4.
- Libellen in Liberia. Gedichte und Berichte (2010)
- Aroma (2010), ISBN 978-3-518-42167-3
- Koloss im Nebel (2012), ISBN 978-3-518-42316-5
- Cyrano oder Die Rückkehr vom Mond. Suhrkamp Verlag, Berlin 2014, ISBN 978-3-518-42415-5
- Die Jahre im Zoo. Ein Kaleidoskop. Suhrkamp Verlag, Berlin 2015, ISBN 978-3-518-42491-9
- Zündkerzen. Gedichte. Suhrkamp Verlag, Berlin 2017, ISBN 978-3-518-42753-8
- Oper. Libretti. Suhrkamp Verlag, Berlin 2018
- Contributor to A New Divan: A Lyrical Dialogue Between East and West ISBN 978-1-909942-28-8
- Äquidistanz (2022), ISBN 978-3-518-43098-9

=== Prose ===
- Galilei vermisst Dantes Hölle und bleibt an den Maßen hängen. Aufsätze 1989–1995 (1996), ISBN 3-518-40758-9
- Das erste Jahr. Berliner Aufzeichnungen (2001), ISBN 3-518-41277-9
- Warum schriftlos leben. Aufsätze (2003), ISBN 3-518-12435-8
- Antike Dispositionen (2005)
- Die Bars von Atlantis. Eine Erkundigung in vierzehn Tauchgängen (2009), ISBN 3-518-12598-2
- Der Komet (2023), ISBN 978-3-518-43020-0

=== Books in English translation ===
- Ashes for Breakfast: Selected Poems, (translated in 2005 by Michael Hofmann) (shortlisted for the 2006 International Griffin Poetry Prize)
- Descartes' Devil: Three Meditations (translated by Anthea Bell; published by Upper West Side Philosophers, Inc., New York, 2010)
- The Bars of Atlantis: Selected Essays. (edited and with an introduction by Michael Eskin; published by Farrar, Straus and Giroux, New York, 2010)
- The Vocation of Poetry (translated by Michael Eskin; published by Upper West Side Philosophers, Inc., New York, 2011)
- Mortal Diamond: Poems (translated by Michael Eskin; published by Upper West Side Philosophers, Inc., New York, 2013)
- Porcelain: Poem on the Downfall of my City (translated by Karen Leeder; published by Seagull Books, Calcutta, New York, London, 2020)
- Psyche Running: Selected Poems 2005-2022 (translated by Karen Leeder; published by Seagull Books, Calcutta, New York, 2024)
