= Amiot (car manufacturer) =

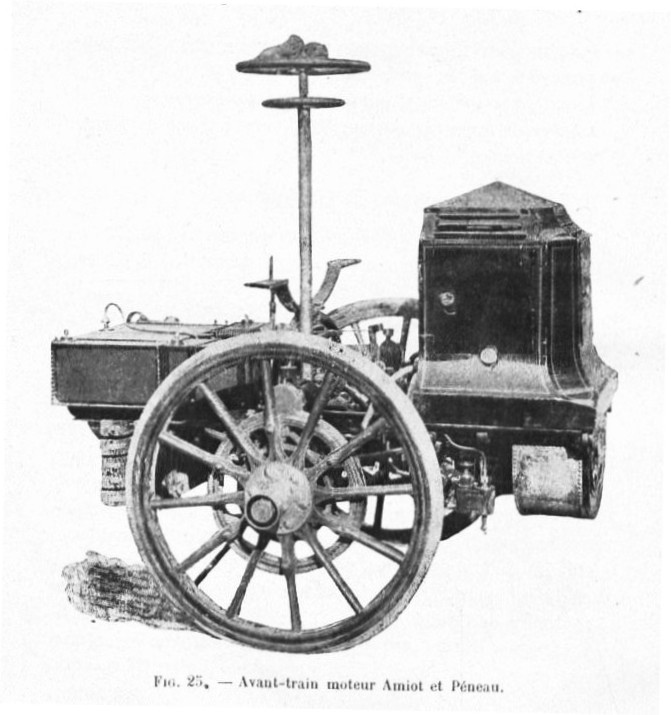

The Amiot, later known as the Amiot-Péneau, was a French tractor-type vehicle manufactured in Asnières-sur-Seine from 1897 to 1902. It was not an automobile per se; rather, it was a front-wheel-drive power pack used to convert horse-drawn carriages into motor cars. These devices were quite popular at the time in France and were known as "avant-train", and the Amiot was one of the first on the market.

The original Amiot was a four-wheeled unit with a 6 hp (4.5 kW) Cyclope or Augé engine; an electric version was also manufactured. The Amiot-Péneau was two-wheeled.

== See also ==
- Latil
- Ponsard-Ansaloni
- Ponts-Moteurs

== External reference ==
- Beaulieu Encyclopedia of the Automobile. Editor Nick Georgano. Stationery Office, London. ISBN 1-57958-293-1
