= Grauzone morgens =

1988 poetry collection by Durs Grünbein

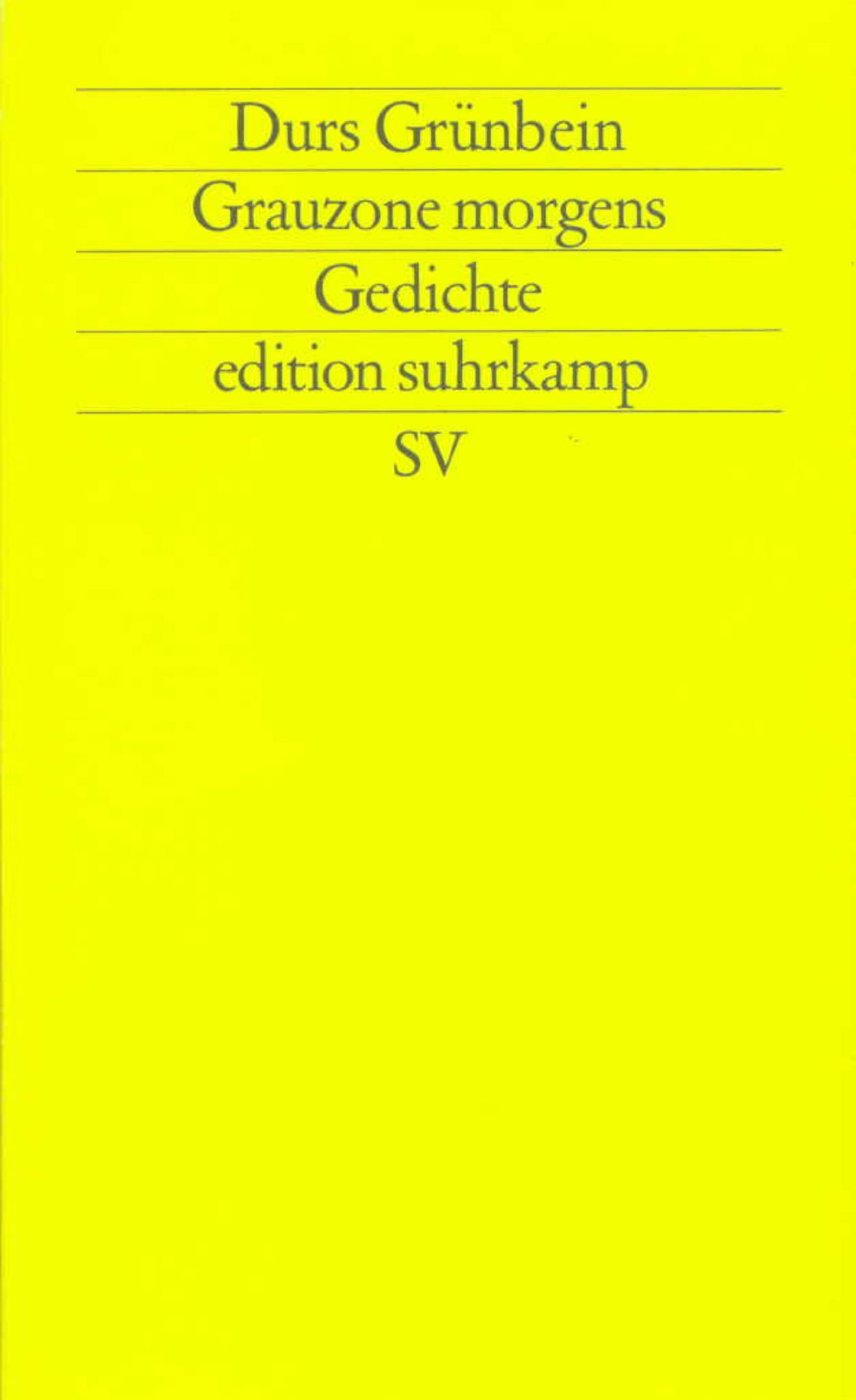
- Author: Durs Grünbein
- Language: German
- Publisher: Suhrkamp Verlag
- Publication date: 26 September 1988
- Publication place: West Germany
- Pages: 96
- ISBN: 978-3-518-11507-7

Grauzone morgens (transl. Grey Zone in the Morning) is the debut poetry collection of the German writer Durs Grünbein, published by Suhrkamp Verlag in 1988. The poems are long and use short lines, sometimes arranged similarly to elegies and odes. They use laconic language to make everyday observations and reflections based on the poet's urban surroundings.

Hermann Korte wrote that the book transcends the intellectual subculture of Prenzlauer Berg in East Berlin that Grünbein came out of, and should be read as "a furious encounter with a new, unmistakable lyric poet's voice".
