= Erklärte Nacht =

- First edition
- Author: Durs Grünbein
- Language: German
- Publisher: Suhrkamp Verlag
- Publication date: 2002
- Publication place: Germany
- Pages: 149
- ISBN: 3-518-41305-8

Erklärte Nacht ("Declared night") is a 2002 poetry collection by the German writer Durs Grünbein.

== See also ==
- 2002 in poetry
- German literature
