= Karen Leeder =

British writer, translator and academic (born 1962)

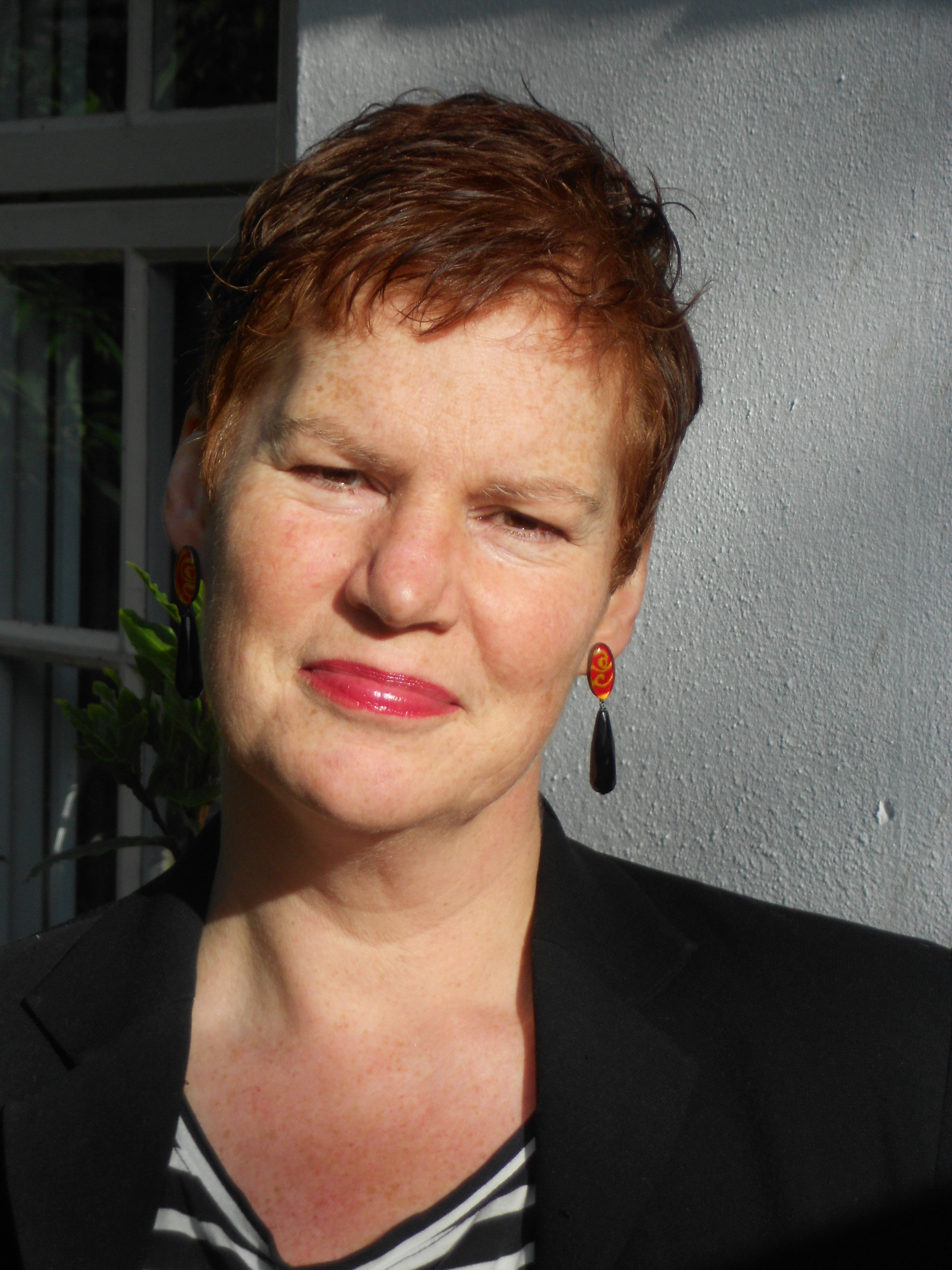
- Born: 1962 (age 63–64); Derbyshire, England
- Education: Magdalen College, Oxford; University of Hamburg
- Occupations: Writer, translator and academic

Karen Leeder (born 1962) is a British writer, translator and scholar of German culture. From 1993, she was Fellow of German at New College, Oxford, and Professor of Modern German Literature in the University of Oxford. In 2021, she was elected as Schwarz-Taylor Professor of the German Language and Literature, a position she took up at The Queen's College, Oxford, in 2022.

== Early life and education ==
Born in Derbyshire, in the East Midlands of England, she lived in Rugby and attended Rugby High School and Rugby School. She studied German at Magdalen College, Oxford, and the University of Hamburg.

== Career ==
Leeder taught at Emmanuel College, Cambridge, as Official Fellow in German, for three years from 1990, before taking up a post as a Fellow at New College, Oxford, in 1993. Her interests include post-war German literature, the literature of the GDR, German poetry, Bertolt Brecht, Rainer Maria Rilke, spectres and angels, translation.

From 1993 to 2022, Leeder was Fellow in German at New College, Oxford. In 2021, she was elected as Schwarz-Taylor Professor of the German Language and Literature, a position she took up at The Queen's College, Oxford, in 2022. In 2023, she embarked on a three-year Einstein fellowship at the Free University of Berlin on the project AfterWords.

In 2017, she became a Fellow of the Royal Society of Arts, and in 2020 she was elected to the Academia Europaea.

She is a translator, and has won prizes for her translations of Volker Braun, Evelyn Schlag, Durs Grünbein and Ulrike Almut Sandig. She has published widely on German culture, including several volumes on Rilke and Brecht. With Christopher Young and Michael Eskin, Leeder was commissioning editor for the de Gruyter series of Companions to Contemporary German Culture (2012–2022).

In 2025, Leeder was awarded the Griffin Poetry Prize for her translation of Grünbein's collection Psyche Running: Selected Poems 2005-2022.

== Publications ==
- Breaking Boundaries: A New Generation of Poets in the GDR (Oxford University Press, 1996).
- With Tom Kuhn, The Young Brecht (London: Libris, 1992, paperback 1996)
- Editor, with Tom Kuhn, Empedocles' Shoe: Essays on Brecht's poetry (London: Methuen Publishing, 2002)
- Editor, with Erdmut Wizisla, O Chicago! O Widerspruch!: Ein Hundert Gedichte auf Brecht (Berlin: Transit, 2006)
- Editor, Schaltstelle: Neue deutsche Lyrik im Dialog, German Monitor 69 (Amsterdam, Atlanta, GA: Rodopi, 2007)
- Editor, Flaschenpost: German Poetry and the Long Twentieth Century, Special Edition of German Life and Letters (GLL, LX, No. 3, 2007)
- Editor, From Stasiland to Ostalgie. The GDR Twenty Years After, A special edition of Oxford German Studies, OGS, 38.3 (Oxford, 2009)
- Editor, with Robert Vilain, The Cambridge Companion to Rilke (Cambridge: Cambridge University Press, 2009)
- Editor, with Robert Vilain, Nach Duino: Studien zu Rainer Maria Rilkes späten Gedichten (Göttingen: Wallstein, 2009)
- Editor, with Laura Bradley, Brecht & the GDR: Politics, Culture, Posterity, Edinburgh German Yearbook, vol. 5 (Rochester, NY: Camden House, 2011)
- Editor, with Michael Eskin and Christopher Young, Durs Grünbein: A Companion (Berlin, New York: de Gruyter, 2013)
- Editor, Figuring Lateness in Modern German Culture, special edition of New German Critique, 42.1, 125 (2015)
- Editor, Rereading East Germany: The Literature and Film of the GDR (Cambridge: Cambridge University Press, 2016, paperback 2019)
- Editor, with Michale Eskin and Marko Pajevic, Paul Celan Today (Berlin, New York: de Gruyter, 2021)
- Editor, with Lyn Marven, Ulrike Draesner: A Companion (Berlin, New York: de Gruyter, 2022)

== Translations ==
- Michael Krüger, Scenes from the Life of a Best-selling Author, trans. Leeder (London: Harvill, 2002; pbk. Vintage, 2004).
- Raoul Schrott, The Desert of Lop, trans. Leeder (London: Macmillan Picador, 2004).
- Evelyn Schlag, Selected Poems, ed. and trans. Leeder (Manchester: Carcanet Press, 2004). Winner of Schlegel Tieck Prize for Translation 2005.
- Hans Magnus Enzensberger, Fatal Numbers: Why count on Chance?, trans. Leeder (New York: Upper West Side Philosophers, 2011). Shortlisted for National Book Critics Circle Award 2011.
- Wilhelm Schmid, High on Low: Harnessing the Power of Unhappiness, trans. Leeder (New York: Upper West Side Philosophers, 2014). Winner of Independent Publisher Book Award for Self Help (2015), Named Finalist for a Next Generation Indie Book Award for Self Help (2015); Gold Medal and Winner of Living Now Book Award (2015)
- Volker Braun, Rubble Flora: Selected Poems, trans. David Constantine and Leeder (Calcutta, London, New York: Seagull Books, 2014). Commended for Popescu Poetry Translation Prize 2015.
- Michael Krüger, Last Day of the Year: Selected Poems, trans. Leeder (New York, London: Sheep Meadow, 2014).
- Ulrike Almut Sandig, Thick of it, trans. Leeder (Calcutta, London, New York: Seagull Books, 2018).
- Evelyn Schlag, All Under One Roof, trans. Leeder (Manchester, Carcanet Press, 2018).
- Raoul Schrott, The Sex of the Angel: The Saints in their Heaven: A Breviary, trans. Leeder (London, New York: Seagull Books, 2018)
- Ulrike Almut Sandig, Grimm, trans. Leeder (Oxford: Hurst Street, 2018), special limited edition with illustrations.
- Michael Krüger, The God behind the Window, trans. Leeder and Peter Thompson (London, New York: Seagull Books, 2019).
- Gerd Ludwig, Evelyn Schlag, Leeder, I LOVE AFRICA, Festival La Gacilly-Baden Photo 2018 (Baden: Lammerhuber, 2019).
- Michael Krüger, Postscript, trans. Leeder (New York: Sheep Meadow, 2019).
- Ulrike Almut Sandig, I am a field full of rapeseed give cover to deer and shine like thirteen oil paintings laid one on top of the other, trans. Leeder (Calcutta, New York, London: Seagull Books, 2020).
- Durs Grünbein, Porcelain: Poem on the Downfall of My City, trans. Leeder (Calcutta, New York, London: Seagull Books, 2020).
- Durs Grünbein, For the Dying Calves. Beyond Literature. Oxford Lectures, trans. Leeder (Calcutta, New York, London: Seagull Books, 2021).
- Ulrike Almut Sandig, Monsters Like Us, trans. Leeder (Calcutta, New York, London: Seagull Books, 2022). Longlisted for Dublin Literature Award 2034
- Volker Braun, Great Fugue, trans. Leeder and David Constantine (Ripon: Smokestack, 2022).
- Ulrike Almut Sandig, Shining Sheep, trans. Leeder (London and Calcutta: Seagull Books, 2023).
- Michael Krüger, In a Cabin in the Woods, trans. Leeder (London and Calcutta: Seagull Books, 2024)
- Durs Grünbein, Psyche Running: Selected Poems 2005-2022, trans. Leeder (London and Calcutta: Seagull Books, 2024)

== Prizes ==
- 2000: Literarisches Colloquium Berlin summer school scholarship
- 2002: One month Writer in Residence LCB
- 2005: Winner of Schlegel Tieck Prize for Evelyn Schlag Selected Poems (Carcanet Press, 2004)
- 2013: Winner of Times Stephen Spender Prize for Durs Grünbein, Childhood in the Diorama
- 2014: Deutsche Übersetzerfonds/Goethe Institut: ViceVersa: Deutsch-Englische Übersetzerwerkstatt im LCB, 2014, Berlin (Ulrike Almut Sandig)
- 2014: Robert Bosch Stiftung/Goethe Institut: "Frühling der Barbaren. Deutschsprachige Literatur aktuell", 2014 (Berlin, Leipzig)
- 2014–15: Knowledge Exchange Fellow, University of Oxford/Southbank Centre, London
- 2015: Translation of High on Low (Upper West Side philosophers' Inc., 2014). Winner of Independent Publisher Book Award for Self Help (2015), Named Finalist for a Next Generation Indie Book Award for Self Help (2015); Gold Medal and Winner of Living Now Book Award for Personal Growth (2015)
- 2016: English PEN, EUNIC, European Literature Festival, New European Literature Translation pitch overall winner for translations of Ulrike Almut Sandig Thick of it (2016)
- 2016: American PEN PEN/Heim Translation award for Ulrike Almut Sandig, Thick of it
- 2017: The John Frederick Nims Memorial Prize for Translation for Durs Grünbein, The Doctrine of Photography. Poetry, 2018
- 2021: Winner of Schlegel-Tieck Prize for Durs Grünbein, Porcelain: Poem on the Downfall of my City, trans. Leeder (Seagull Books, 2021).
- 2025: Winner of Griffin Prize for Durs Grünbein, Psyche Running: Selected Poems 2005-2022 (Seagull Books 2024).
