= Evelyn Schlag =

Austrian poet and novelist

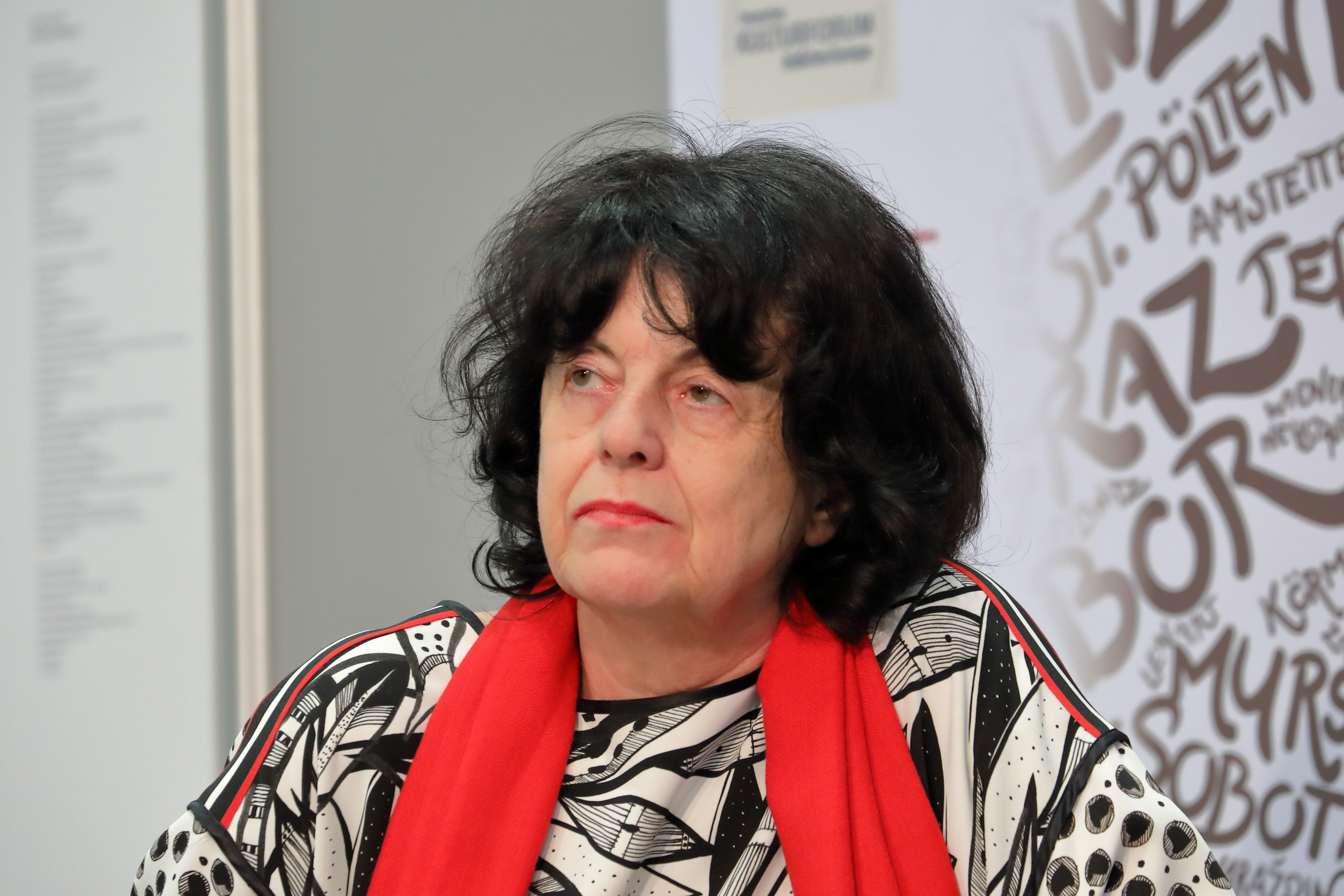
Evelyn Schlag

Evelyn Schlag (born 1952) is an Austrian poet and novelist. She was born and raised in Waidhofen an der Ybbs and studied at the University of Vienna. She lived in Vienna for a few years before moving back to her native Waidhofen, where she continues to live today. Schlag has published more than a dozen books ranging from prose fiction to acclaimed poetry. She has also translated the work of the British poet Douglas Dunn into German.

Schlag’s novel Die Kränkung was published in English translation under the title Quotations of a Body. Karen Leeder's translation of Schlag's selected poetry won the Schlegel-Tieck Prize.
