= Porcelain: Poem on the Downfall of My City =

2005 poetry collection by Durs Grünbein

- Author: Durs Grünbein
- Original title: Porzellan. Poem vom Untergang meiner Stadt
- Translator: Karen Leeder
- Language: German
- Publisher: Suhrkamp Verlag
- Publication date: 2005
- Publication place: Germany
- English publication date: 2020
- Pages: 49
- ISBN: 9783518417225

Porcelain: Poem on the Downfall of My City (German: Porzellan. Poem vom Untergang meiner Stadt) is a 2005 poetry collection by the German writer Durs Grünbein. It consists of 49 poems about the city of Dresden, lamenting its developments and destruction in February 1945 when the Allies of World War II subjected it to heavy aerial bombardment.

The English interpretation by Karen Leeder received the Schlegel-Tieck Prize for 2021.
