= Rigobert Ngouolali =

Congolese politician

Rigobert Ngouolali is a Congolese politician. He served in the government of Congo-Brazzaville as Minister of Water, Forests, and Fishing during the 1990s, and he has been President of Action for the Rebirth of Congo (ARC), a political party, since 2008.

== Professional career ==
A graduate of the National School of Water and Forestry Engineering (École nationale des ingénieurs des travaux des eaux et forêts, ENITEF) in France, Ngouolali is a water and forestry engineer by profession. He was Co-Director of the Forester Center for Training and Demonstration, a United Nations Development Programme (UNDP) project based in Mossendjo, from 1967 to 1969. Ngouolali then worked as Director of Water and Forests at the Ministry of Agriculture, Water, and Forests from 1969 to 1976. Subsequently he was Congo-Brazzaville's Representative to the African Timber Organization, based in Libreville, from 1976 to 1990. Ngouolali was the African Timber Organization's Director of Industrialization from 1976 to 1981 and its Deputy Secretary-General from 1981 to 1990. He then worked as Deputy Director-General of the Industrial Afforestation Unit of Congo from 1990 to 1991.

== Political career during the 1990s ==
Ngouolali participated in the February–June 1991 National Conference, which initiated a political transition leading to multiparty elections. After the National Conference, he helped to found the Union of Democratic Forces (UFD), a political party led by Charles David Ganao, and he became the First Vice-President of the UFD. In the May 1992 local elections, Ngouolali was elected as a municipal councillor in Brazzaville. He was then elected to the National Assembly in the June–July 1992 parliamentary election as the UFD candidate in Talangaï, the sixth arrondissement of Brazzaville.

The National Assembly elected in 1992 sat for only a few months before it was dissolved by President Pascal Lissouba, who preferred to call another election rather than cooperate with an opposition-controlled National Assembly. In the May–June 1993 parliamentary election, Ngouolali was re-elected to the National Assembly as the UFD candidate in Talangaï. The Presidential Tendency, a coalition of parties that supported Lissouba and included the UFD, won a parliamentary majority in that election.

Although the opposition furiously contested the official results of the 1993 election, President Lissouba proceeded to appoint a new government based on his parliamentary majority on 23 June 1993. In that government, led by Prime Minister Joachim Yhombi-Opango, Ngouolali was appointed as Minister of Water, Forests, and Fishing. He was not included in the government appointed on 23 January 1995.

== Political activities since 2007 ==
In the June 2007 parliamentary election, Ngouolali stood again as a candidate for the sixth constituency of Talangaï, but he was defeated. He subsequently left the UFD in October 2007, objecting to the party's decision to join the Presidential Majority supporting President Denis Sassou Nguesso; according to Ngouolali, that decision was made by the leadership without properly consulting the rest of the party. He then formed a new political party, the Action for the Rebirth of Congo (ARC), which he officially launched on 12 January 2008. The ARC initially drew most of its support from the Talangaï section of Brazzaville. It joined an opposition coalition, the Alliance for a New Republic (ANR), in November 2008.

In February 2009, together with 17 other opposition leaders, Ngouolali signed an agreement on the creation of a front intended to defeat President Sassou Nguesso in the July 2009 presidential election. Ngouolali was one of 17 individuals who applied to stand as candidates in that election. However, in a ruling on 18 June 2009, the Constitutional Court rejected Ngouolali's candidacy on the grounds that he had provided a post office box number instead of identifying a place of residence. According to the Court, Ngouolali had thus failed to prove his continuous residency in Congo-Brazzaville over the preceding two years, as required by the Constitution. Ngouolali was one of four candidates whose applications were rejected by the Court.

Speaking on 23 June 2009, Ngouolali complained that he did not understand why his candidate application was rejected, noting that he had documentation demonstrating his residency in Brazzaville. According to Ngouolali, an official had told him that, because he lived in an apartment, it would be acceptable for him to list a post office box instead of a street address. Nevertheless, Ngouolali stressed that he respected the Court's decision; his reluctance to criticize the Court stood in contrast to statements from some other opposition leaders, who did not hesitate to denounce the Court's rulings as politically motivated. He expressed his hope that "one day, when the sun of freedom, genuine democracy, national unity, and reconciliation truly shine on Congo", he could participate in a "genuine opposition".

Marking the ARC's second anniversary at festivities in Brazzaville on 19 February 2010, Ngouolali said that the elections held under Sassou Nguesso were not genuinely democratic, and he called on his party to work for a return to the kind of democratic elections that were held in the 1990s. He argued that the ARC's strength was not reflected in the official results of the 2008 local elections.

The ARC was included in an opposition coalition, the Front of Congolese Opposition Parties (FPOC), and at FPOC's third national convention, held in Brazzaville on 9–10 April 2011, Ngouolali was elected as President of FPOC. He succeeded Clément Mierassa at the head of the coalition; its leadership was held on a rotating basis.
