= Der Komet =

2023 novel by Durs Grünbein

- Author: Durs Grünbein
- Language: German
- Publisher: Suhrkamp Verlag
- Publication date: 19 November 2023
- Publication place: Germany
- Pages: 282
- ISBN: 978-3-518-43020-0

Der Komet. Ein Bericht (lit. 'The Comet: A Report') is a 2023 novel by the German writer Durs Grünbein. It is based on the life of Grünbein's grandmother Dora Wachtel and portrays the city of Dresden during the National Socialist period until its destruction in 1945, when it was subjected to American and British indiscriminate area bombing.

Ursula März called the book "a brilliant example of what literature is capable of: restoring the meaning and greatness an individual fate lost in the machinery of historical events".
