= Äquidistanz =

2022 poetry collection by Durs Grünbein

- Author: Durs Grünbein
- Language: German
- Publication date: 18 July 2022
- Publication place: Germany
- Pages: 183
- ISBN: 978-3-518-43098-9

Äquidistanz (lit. 'Equidistance') is the twelfth poetry collection by the German writer Durs Grünbein, published by Suhrkamp Verlag in 2022. It consists of poems that use history to establish a sense of place, focusing on areas in Germany and Italy, and more broadly evoking European history and identity.
