= Hubert Gatignon =

French marketing professor

- Known for: Marketing research, Marketing strategy, Innovation strategies

Hubert Gatignon is an emeritus professor of marketing at INSEAD, Fontainebleau, France. According to Google Scholar, Gatignon has an i10-index of 63.

== Education ==
Hubert Gatignon received his Baccalauréat, Série C at the Lycée Pierre et Marie Curie in Châteauroux, France in 1969, after which point he went on to receive a Diploma of Higher Commercial, Administrative and Financial Studies (Diplôme d'Etudes Supérieures Commerciales, Administratives et Financières) from ESCAE (Poitiers) in 1973. From there, Dr Gatignon attended the University of California, Los Angeles where he earned a Master of Business Administration and Doctor of Philosophy in Management in 1975 and 1981, respectively.

== Career ==
Hubert Gatignon has worked as an associate and later full professor at the Wharton School of the University of Pennsylvania and in 1994, took a job with INSEAD, where he was employed as a professor of marketing and held the school's Claude Janssen Chair in Business Administration.

He is currently Professor of Marketing Emeritus and the Claude Janssen Chaired Professor of Business Administration Emeritus. He has a membership or affiliation with groups such as The Academy of International Business, The Institute of Management Sciences, and American Marketing Association, and was an Academic Trustee with the Marketing Science Institute from 1998 through 2004.

=== Editorial positions ===
Professor Gatignon has held multiple editorial positions, which include the following:

- Associate editor, Journal of Marketing Research (2006 - 2016)
- Policy Board Member, Editorial Review Board Member, International Journal of Research in Marketing (IJRM)
  - Editor in chief from 2000 to 2006
- Editorial Review Board Member, Journal of Marketing (1986-1991;1996-2002;2008-2016)
- Editorial Review Board Member: Marketing Science (1990-2016)
- Board Member: Journal of the Academy of Marketing Science (2009-2016)

== Research ==
Gatignon has performed research in areas that include "marketing strategy and especially, innovation strategies, as well as international marketing strategy."

== Select bibliography ==
=== Books ===
- Making Innovation Last: Strategies for Sustained Growth Vols. 1 & 2, Palgrave-macmillan Publishers (2016, with David Gotteland and Christophe Haon)
- New Products and Services Development Vols. I - IV, Sage (2011, editor)
- MARKSTRAT Handbook: The Strategic Marketing Simulation, StratX International (2010, with Hubert Gatignon and Rémi Triolet)
- The INSEAD-Wharton Alliance on Globalizing: Strategies for Building Successful Global Businesses, Cambridge University Press (2004, editor with John Kimberly)
- Statistical Analysis of Management Data, Kluwer Academic Publishers (2003), 2nd and 3rd editions, Springer Science+Business Media, LLC (2010, 2014)

== See also ==
- Markstrat, a simulation game created by Jean-Claude Larréché and Hubert Gatignon
