= Markstrat =

Business simulation video game

- Developer: StratX Simulations
- Publisher: StratX Simulations
- Platform: web-based
- Genre: Business simulation game
- Mode: Multiplayer

Markstrat is a multiplayer business market simulation game developed by Jean-Claude Larréché and Professor Hubert Gatignon in which players take control of a virtual corporation. Players make a number of decisions in marketing, finance, research and development, and other areas in order to achieve a better performance than competing players, who also take control of their own companies. After the game was developed it was distributed on an ad-hoc basis by the French business school INSEAD. Markstrat is played in over 500 academic institutions worldwide, including 8 of the top 10 international business schools.

== Structure and gameplay ==
The simulation generally consists of ten periods, in an industry that contains six companies. Each of these companies, labeled by letters, are player groups that consist of 3 to 6 people. All the companies in the industry start the simulation in the same situation with the same products, which are artificial products called Sonites. As the game progresses the companies get the chance to develop better products or enter a new market, which is a market for another artificial product called Vodite. Unlike the Sonite market the Vodite market is a new market so the actions of the players affect this market differently than the developed Sonite market.

The players should give verdicts on the amount of production of a certain product, the advertisement budget of a product, and the target segments and targeted qualities of the advertisement. The marketing decisions also include the number of the sales force for each product that can be allocated to various sales centers such as specialty stores, department stores and mass merchandisers. The competing companies also have the chance to create new products to reach various market segments and increase their market share. The characteristics of the products can be changed and made more attractive for the targeted segment. These research projects can either modify the existing products or create new products.

The players also have the chance to conduct market research and gather information on their customers, their habits and their interests. Many research studies also exist to apprehend the moves competitor groups make. The marketing research makes this information available to companies and the players can purchase the research studies they want. On every period the players must submit certain decisions that will affect the progress of their company in the following period. The only time the players can interact with the situation of their company is at the beginning of a period. After the decisions are submitted, the players wait for the results of the next period. Companies' cumulative net contribution, stock price index, market capitalization and market share are mostly used to measure the performances of the players. The team that has the highest net contribution margin or share price index (depends on the admin setting) would be considered the winner.

== Usage ==
Markstrat is mostly used to assess the group dynamics and decision-making processes of the players. It is used in higher-level education, incorporated in a certain class such as marketing or finance. Often, the results from the simulation reflect a certain portion of the grade. The game was originally built for MBA students to play; however, the simulation became widespread and started being used for both undergraduate and graduate students. There are corporations that also use it to assess their employees' skills.
