= On Snow =

2003 long poem by Durs Grünbein

- Author: Durs Grünbein
- Original title: Vom Schnee
- Language: German
- Publisher: Suhrkamp Verlag
- Publication date: 15 September 2003
- Publication place: Germany
- Pages: 144
- ISBN: 978-3-518-41455-2

On Snow (German: Vom Schnee) is a 2003 long poem by the German writer Durs Grünbein. It has the subtitle or Descartes in Germany (oder Descartes in Deutschland). It focuses on the life of the French philosopher René Descartes. Andreas Nentwich of Die Zeit described it as "a baroque picture arc of war, violence, vanity and a lot of snow".

== See also ==
- 2002 in poetry
- German literature
