= Ulrike Almut Sandig =

German writer (born 1979)

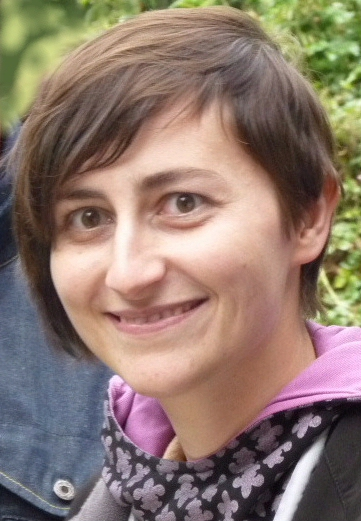
- Born: 1979 (age 46–47); Großenhain, East Germany
- Education: German Institute for Literature
- Occupation: Writer
- Writing career
- Notable awards: Leonce-und-Lena-Preis (2009); Droste-Preis (2012); Roswitha Prize (2020)
- Website: ulrike-almut-sandig.de

Ulrike Almut Sandig (born 1979) is a German writer. She was born in Großenhain in the former GDR, and has lived in Riesa, Leipzig and Berlin. She studied religious studies and indology at university, and then studied at the German Institute for Literature in Leipzig.

She started her writing career by distributing her poems in public places in Leipzig. She has published three volumes of poetry: Zunder (2005/2009), Streumen (2007), and Dickicht (2011). Her first book of short stories titled Flamingos came out in 2010. She has also written for the radio, and published audiobooks.

She has received numerous prizes, among them the Leonce-und-Lena Prize (2009), the Merano Poetry Prize (2006) and the Droste-Preis for Emerging Talent (Literaturförderpreis) (2012). She has also done residencies in Helsinki and Sydney. Her work has been translated into various languages, and an English-language selection of her work, translated by Karen Leeder, was runner-up in the Schlegel-Tieck Prize. Most recently she was awarded the Wilhelm Lehmann Prize in 2018, the Roswitha Prize in 2020 and the Erich Loest Prize in 2021.

Sandig lives with her family in Berlin.

== Memberships ==
- Akademie der Wissenschaften und der Literatur, Mainz
- PEN Centre Germany, Darmstadt

== Publications ==
- Sandig, Ulrike A. (2005). Zunder : Gedichte (in German). Leipzig: Connewitzer Verlagsbuchhdlg. ISBN 3-937799-16-8. OCLC 69733877.
- Sandig, Ulrike Almut; Göhlich, André (2007). Streumen Gedichte (in German). Leipzig: Müller Buchbinderei. ISBN 978-3-937799-30-8. OCLC 213394369.
- Sandig, Ulrike A. (2011). Dickicht : Gedichte (in German). Frankfurt am Main: Schöffling. ISBN 978-3-89561-186-5. OCLC 703207479.
- Sandig, Ulrike Almut; Pelny, Marlen (2011), Märzwald Dichtung für die Freunde der Popmusik (in German), Frankfurt, M, ISBN 978-3-89561-187-2, OCLC 785086481
- Sandig, Ulrike Almut (2012). Flamingos Geschichten (in German). Frankfurt, M. ISBN 978-3-596-19216-8. OCLC 805356415.
- Sandig, Ulrike A. (2015). Buch gegen das Verschwinden : Geschichten (in German). Frankfurt am Main. ISBN 978-3-89561-188-9. OCLC 902615837.
- Sandig, Ulrike Almut (2016). Ich bin ein Feld voller Raps, verstecke die Rehe und leuchte wie dreizehn Ölgemälde übereinandergelegt Gedichte (in German). Frankfurt am Main: Schöffling & Co. ISBN 978-3-89561-189-6. OCLC 949780685.
- Sandig, Ulrike Almut (2016). Ulrike Almut Sandig (in German). Wilhelmshorst. ISBN 978-3-943708-23-3. OCLC 946743391.
- Buchwald, Christoph; Sandig, Ulrike Almut (2017). Jahrbuch der Lyrik 2017 (in German). Frankfurt am Main: Schöffling & Co. ISBN 978-3-89561-680-8. OCLC 965629824.
- Sandig, Ulrike A. (2020). Monster wie wir : Roman (in German). Frankfurt am Main. ISBN 978-3-89561-183-4. OCLC 1196909036.
- Sandig, Ulrike A. (2022). Leuchtende Schafe : Gedichte (in German). Frankfurt am Main. ISBN 978-3-89561-182-7. OCLC 1303211418.
- Sandig, Ulrike Almut (2026). Im Orkan: Roman. Frankfurt am Main: Schöffling und Co. Verlag. ISBN 978-3-690-97009-9.

=== In English ===
- Sandig, Ulrike A.; Leeder, Karen J. (2018). Thick of it. London. ISBN 978-0-85742-556-0. OCLC 1019618443.
- Sandig, Ulrike A.; Leeder, Karen J. (2018). Grimm. Oxford and London. OCLC 1019618443.
- Sandig, Ulrike A.; Leeder, Karen J. (2020). I am a field full of rapeseed, give cover to deer and shine like thirteen oil paintings laid one on top of the other. London. ISBN 978-0-85742-737-3. OCLC 1173170562.
- Sandig, Ulrike A.; Leeder, Karen J. (2022). Monsters like us. London. ISBN 978-0-85742-983-4. OCLC 1295106958.
- Sandig, Ulrike Almut; Leeder, Karen (2023). Shining Sheep: Poems. Seagull Books. ISBN 978-1-80309-252-2.
