= Jean-Claude Siapa Ivouloungou =

Republic of the Congo politician (?-2012)

Jean-Claude Siapa Ivouloungou (1958? – 3 July 2012) was a Congolese politician. A member of the Pan-African Union for Social Democracy (UPADS), he was a Deputy in the National Assembly of the Republic of Congo from 2002 to 2012. When the Pan-African Parliament began meeting in March 2004, he became one of the Republic of Congo's five members.

== Career ==
Siapa Ivouloungou was elected to the National Assembly in the May–June 2002 parliamentary election as the UPADS candidate in Mayoko constituency, located in Niari Region; he won the seat in the first round with 54.38% of the vote. He was re-elected to the National Assembly in the June–August 2007 parliamentary election as the UPADS candidate in Mayoko constituency, this time receiving 75% of the vote.

As spokesman for UPADS, Siapa Ivouloungou denounced the Constitutional Court's June 2009 exclusion of UPADS candidate Ange Edouard Poungui from the July 2009 presidential election. He claimed that the decision, which was based on Poungui's lack of continuous residency for two years, was politically motivated, arguing that "over the last two years, all the candidates moved around, to visit family abroad, to fine-tune their plans".

Siapa Ivouloungou stood again as a candidate for the July 2012 parliamentary election, but he suffered a stroke and died in Paris on 3 July 2012, before the election was held.
