= Jean-Claude Larreche =

French academic (born 1947)

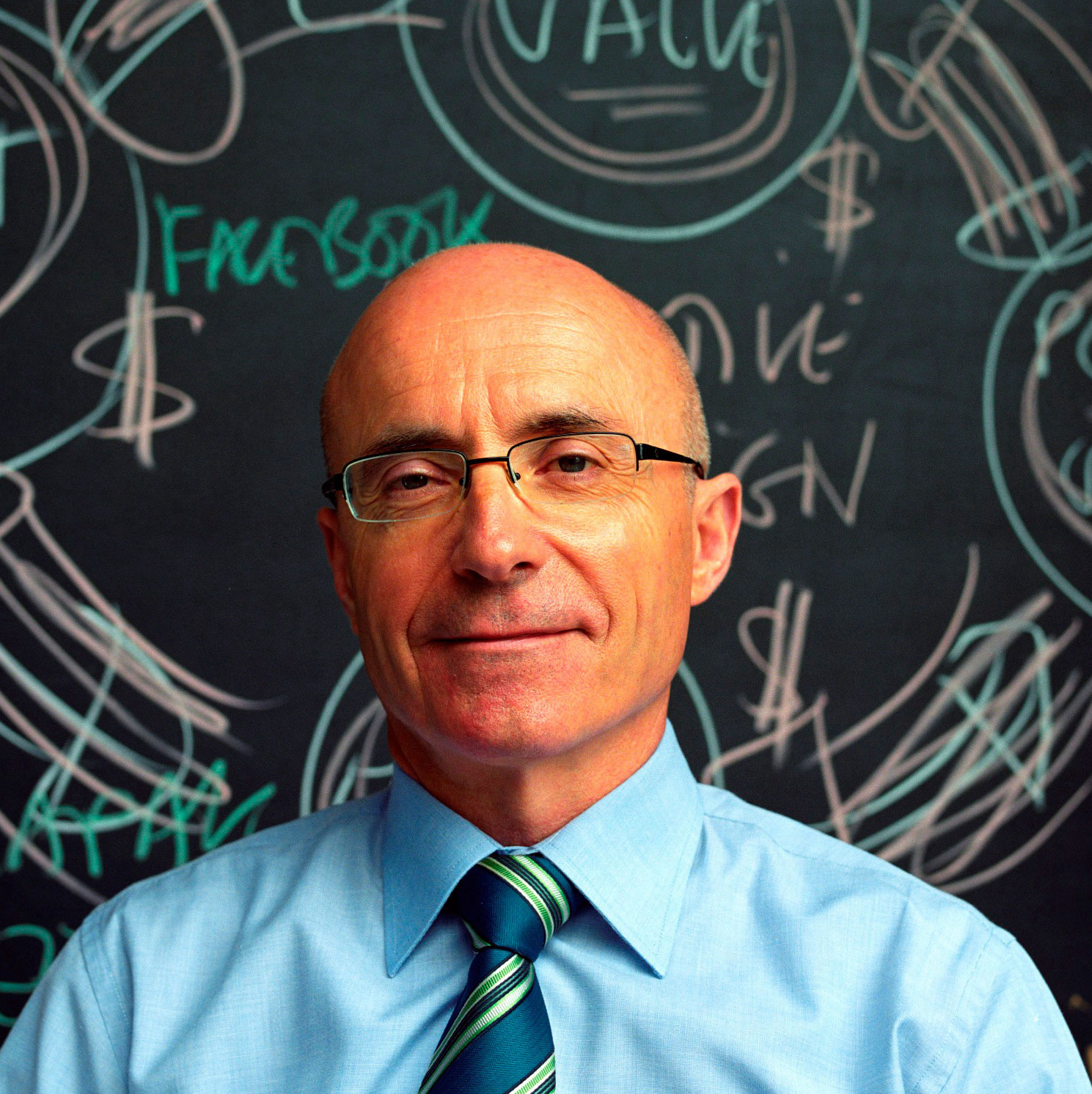
- Born: July 3, 1947 (age 79); St. Louis, Senegal
- Education: INSA Lyon; University of London; INSEAD; Stanford Graduate School of Business
- Occupations: Professor, entrepreneur, marketing consultant, author
- Website: www.larreche.com

Jean-Claude "JC" Larreche (born 3 July 1947) is Emeritus Professor at INSEAD, Fontainebleau, France, where he held the Alfred H. Heineken Chair of Marketing from 1993 to 2018. His academic and business work focuses on marketing and customer orientation.

Larreche is the Founder and President of StratX ExL and of StratX Simulations. StratX ExL organizes seminars on leadership, marketing, for global corporations. StratX Simulations is the provider of a business learning software, including REVMANEX, Markstrat, Circular Markstrat, Digital Markstrat, Blue Ocean Strategy Simulation, BrandPRO, Digital MediaPRO, and MixPRO.

Larreche published several books Value Capture Selling: How to Win the 3rd Sales Transformation (to be published by Wiley in September 2023) and The Momentum Effect: How to Ignite Exceptional Growth, numerous articles and papers

== Education ==
Larreche received a degree in engineering (with a major in computer hardware) from INSA Lyon in 1968. He then developed his expertise in computer software and obtained his MSc in Computer Science from the University of London in 1969. He entered the world of business by studying at INSEAD where he received his MBA in 1970. He specialized further in marketing and modeling at the Stanford Graduate School of Business in California where he obtained his PhD in 1974. While pursuing his PhD at Stanford, Larreche continued to pursue his interest in computer science there—taking classes taught by John McCarthy, the father of artificial intelligence. It was at Stanford that he was given the nickname “JC” by his classmates.

== Career ==
=== Pioneering the development of business simulations ===
After his MBA, in 1970 Larreche assisted L’Oréal assess an MIT-developed computerized marketing model that they were considering purchasing. He was fascinated by it and "decided to investigate the best places in the world to study marketing modeling." Larreche is quoted as saying that he chose Stanford for his PhD so that he could study under David B. Montgomery, one of the founders of marketing modeling.

working with his research assistant, Hubert Gatignon, from 1974 to 1977 Larreche further developed his work on marketing modeling to create a teaching simulation called Markstrat (short for “marketing strategy”). Markstrat is a computer based simulation game where teams of students compete against one another in an artificial world under realistic market conditions. The game provides marketing students and professionals alike with a risk-free platform to test decisions around a variety of concepts, including brand positioning, market segmentation, and product portfolios—enabling them to become more effective at creating value in competitive markets. It is claimed that Markstrat is now used in 8 out of the top 10 business schools in the world and 25 of the top 30 schools in the US.

Larreche developed DiG – Discovery Innovation Growth—a learning tool to develop competencies in innovation, customer centricity, value-based marketing, business acumen, leadership, and team performance.

Larreche designed the REVMANEX simulator for sales and negotiations training.

=== Business activities ===
In 1983, at the age of 36, Larreche was appointed to the board of Reckitt & Coleman (now Reckitt Benckiser), London, in a non-executive role after previously working for the firm in a consultancy capacity. He remained on the board for 18 years.

In 1984, he founded StratX for business schools and global corporations access to computerized experiential learning tools. In 2019 StratX was split into two separate companies: StratX Simulations, computerized business learning software, and StratX ExL, learning seminars, marketing, for global corporations.

Larreche served as a Member of the Board of The MAC Group, Cambridge, Massachusetts, from 1986 through 1990, and was a Non-Executive Director for Smartpool, London, from 2008 through 2012.

Larreche consulted for Alcan, Boeing, British Broadcasting Corporation, British Telecom, Christian Salvesen, Citibank, Digital Equipment, General Electric, Heineken, Hewlett Packard, IBM, ICI, ICL, IMS, MDM Bank, Merck, Nestlé, Nordea, Novartis, Novo Nordisk, Oracle, Partner Re, Pfizer, Polaroid, Randstad, Rank Xerox, Remploy, UBS, Volvo, Zambon, Zeneca, and others.

=== Academic activities ===
During the 1990s, Larreche’s work began to concentrate on the underlying capabilities that impact on a business’s ability to compete in the marketplace and to create corporate value. He published a series of reports based on surveys conducted with more than 1,200 executives of Fortune 1000 companies. The surveys attempted to define and evaluate the attributes, characteristics, and behaviors of large global firms and assess their impact on corporate performance. That work converged on the concept of “momentum”—an attempt to map out a process for improving the efficiency of a firm’s profitable growth . In 2008 he published the book, The Momentum Effect: How to Ignite Exceptional Growth.

More recently, Larreche has focused his attention on the development of the concept of the 3rd sales transformation and its critical importance to the creation of corporate value in the current global business environment of reduced growth and stronger competition. Larreche’s further development of this concept led to the publication in 2023 of his book, Value Capture Selling: How to Win the 3rd Sales Transformation.

=== Editorial positions ===
Role	Journal	Year
Member of the Editorial Board	Journal of Marketing Research	1975-1979
Member of the Editorial Board	Journal of Experiential Learning and Simulation	1978-1982
Member of the Editorial Board	Journal of Marketing	1990-1994

== Recognition ==
Larreche has been widely recognized for his academic and business achievements, including being elected as a faculty member representative to the INSEAD Board for 18 cumulative years. In addition, he has received the following awards:

Year	Award	Work	Organization
1995	"Best Case of the Year" Award	for the Virgin Atlantic Airways case study in Relationship Marketing category	The European Foundation for Management Development (EFMD)
1995	Marketing Educator of the Year		Club 55, the European Community of Marketing Experts.
1996	"Overall European Case of the Year" Award	for the Virgin Atlantic Airways case study	, European Case Clearing House (ECCH)
1997	"Best Case of the Year" Award	for the First Direct case study in Relationship Marketing category	The European Foundation for Management Development (EFMD)
2000	"Overall European Case of the Year" Award for the First Direct	Branchless Banking case study	, European Case Clearing House (ECCH)
2005	Winner, EFMD Case Writing Competition: Entrepreneurship category	“Arpège: Creative Dining in Paris” (INSEAD case)	The European Foundation for Management Development (EFMD)
2008	“4th Best Book of 2008,” Business and Investing category	The Momentum Effect	Amazon USA,
2010	DCF Award for Best Book in “Corporate Strategy”	for French edition of The Momentum Effect	Prix des Dirigeants Commerciaux de France

== Selected bibliography ==
Selected books
Year	Title	Publication	Note
1972	Le Basic: Une introduction à la programmation	Editions Eyrolles	
1977	Markstrat: A Marketing Strategy Game	The Scientific Press	shared with Hubert Gatignon ISBN 978-0894260100
2001	Measuring the Competitive Fitness of Global Firms	Financial Times Press	ISBN 978-0273654346
2006	Marketing Strategy: A Decision-Focused Approach	5th ed. McGraw-Hill	shared with John Mullins, Orville Walker, and Boyd HarperISBN 978-0072961904
2008	The Momentum Effect: How to Ignite Exceptional Growth		ISBN 978-0132363426
2023	Value Capture Selling: How to Win the 3rd Sales Transformation	Wharton School Publishing Wiley	ISBN 978-1394158584

Selected articles
Year	Title	Publication	note
1979	“Integrative Complexity and the Implementation of Marketing Models,”	The Implementation of Management Sciences, Special issue of Management Science, Vol. 13	R. Doktor, R.L. Schultz, and D.P. Slevin, eds, pages 171-188
1979	“A Supportive Application of Management Science to Marketing Strategy Formulation,”	Omega, Vol. 7, No. 3	with E.C. Strong, pages 207-218
1981	“STRATPORT: A Decision Support System for Strategic Planning,”	Journal of Marketing, Vol. 45, No. 4	with V. Srinivasan
1982	“STRATPORT: A Model for the Evaluation and Formulation of Business Portfolio Strategies,”	Management Science, Vol. 28, No. 9	with V. Srinivasan, pages 979-1001
1983	“Managerial Judgment in Marketing: The Concept of Expertise,”	with Reza Moinpour, Journal of Marketing Research, Vol.20	pages 101-121
1987	“On Simulations in Business Education and Research,”	Journal of Business Research, Vol. 15, No. 6	pages 559-571
1988	“Europe's Key Marketing Issues for the '90s,”	International Advertiser, Vol. 1, No. 2	pages 20-23
1989	“The Battlefield for 1992: Product Strength and Geographic Coverage,”	European Management Journal, Vol. 7, No. 2	with Robert Gogel, pages 132-140
2002	“Beyond Strategy: Market-based Capabilities,” in Business: The Ultimate Resource	Cambridge USA: Perseus Publishing; London, Bloomsbury Publishing	pages 87-88
2007	“Momentum,”	World Business, No. 14	pages 12-18
2008	“Building Marketing Excellence,”	Pfeiffer Leadership Annual 2008	with Mario Castaneda and Zohra Jan Mamod.
2008	“Momentum Strategy,”	Strategy, No. 16	pages 12-16
2008	“Momentum strategy for efficient growth: when the sumo meets the surfer,”	International Commerce Review	pages 22-34

== See also ==
- Laura Mazur and Louella Miles (2007). “Jean-Claude Larreche: Marketing Strategy Master.” Conversations With Marketing Masters. Wiley. Pages 45-61.
- Andrew Bergman, “Professor of Professionals,” Horizon Magazine, Heineken International, April 2007, pages 15-16.
- Laura Mazur, “Set the Pace,” The Marketer, March 2007, pages 15-19.
- Blair Campbell, “The Tao of Jean-Claude,” Profit, February 2002, pages 44-47.
