= Jean-Claude Flornoy =

French specialist of the Tarot of Marseille

Jean-Claude Flornoy (1950 – 24 May 2011) was a French specialist of the Tarot of Marseille, a writer and card maker working on bringing back to life historical Tarot decks. He was born in Paris, France, and died in Sainte-Suzanne. He especially worked on restoring the Jean Noblet and Jean Dodal decks.

== Tarot contribution ==
Jean-Claude Flornoy has reproduced a number of early decks in the historical Tarot of Marseille and other early French pattern. He brought back to life the Historic decks, mainly conserved in the Bibliothèque nationale de France in Paris, contributing to save a part of the occidental patrimony.

== Biography ==
Jean-Claude Flornoy (Paris, 1950–2011) was a 'Cartier-enlumineur' living and working in Sainte-Suzanne, France. Following studies centered around philosophy and psychology, he worked for 15 years as potter-ceramist.

He has devoted 20 years to the study of the Tarots of the French (Marseille) Tradition. In 1996 he undertook an oversized restoration of the tarot of Nicolas Conver (Marseille, 1760). His aim was to faithfully bring this traditional imagery back to life in all its original freshness. He then revived large-sized versions of other historic tarots from originals preserved in the Bibliothèque Nationale in Paris: Jean Noblet (Paris, c. 1650), Jean Dodal (Lyon, 1701) and a number of trumps from Jacques Viéville (Paris, c. 1650). It was in painting each arcana on giant canvases (220 cm by 110 cm) that he was able to come to 'understand' the way the images are operative in themselves. He regularly transported them for exhibitions, and offered conference-workshops in a variety of tarot-related contexts.

== Published works ==
=== Books ===
- 2018 Seeing the World, (English translation of Le pèlerinage des bateleurs, translated by David Vine, letarot.com, 2018)
- 2007 Le pèlerinage des bateleurs (only in French)
- 1992 The Pilgrimage of the Soul, being a translation of Le Pèlerinage de l'Âme.

=== Decks ===
The following decks have been reproduced in high-quality and handmade, trumps:

- Jean Noblet, circa 1650
- Jean Dodal, circa 1701
- Nicolas Conver, circa 1760

The following decks have been industrially reproduced:

- Jean Noblet, circa 1650
- Jacques Viéville, circa 1650
- Jean Dodal, circa 1701

== Sources ==
- tarot-history.com
- tarotpedia.com
- letarot.com
- ATS Article
