= Ponts-Moteurs =

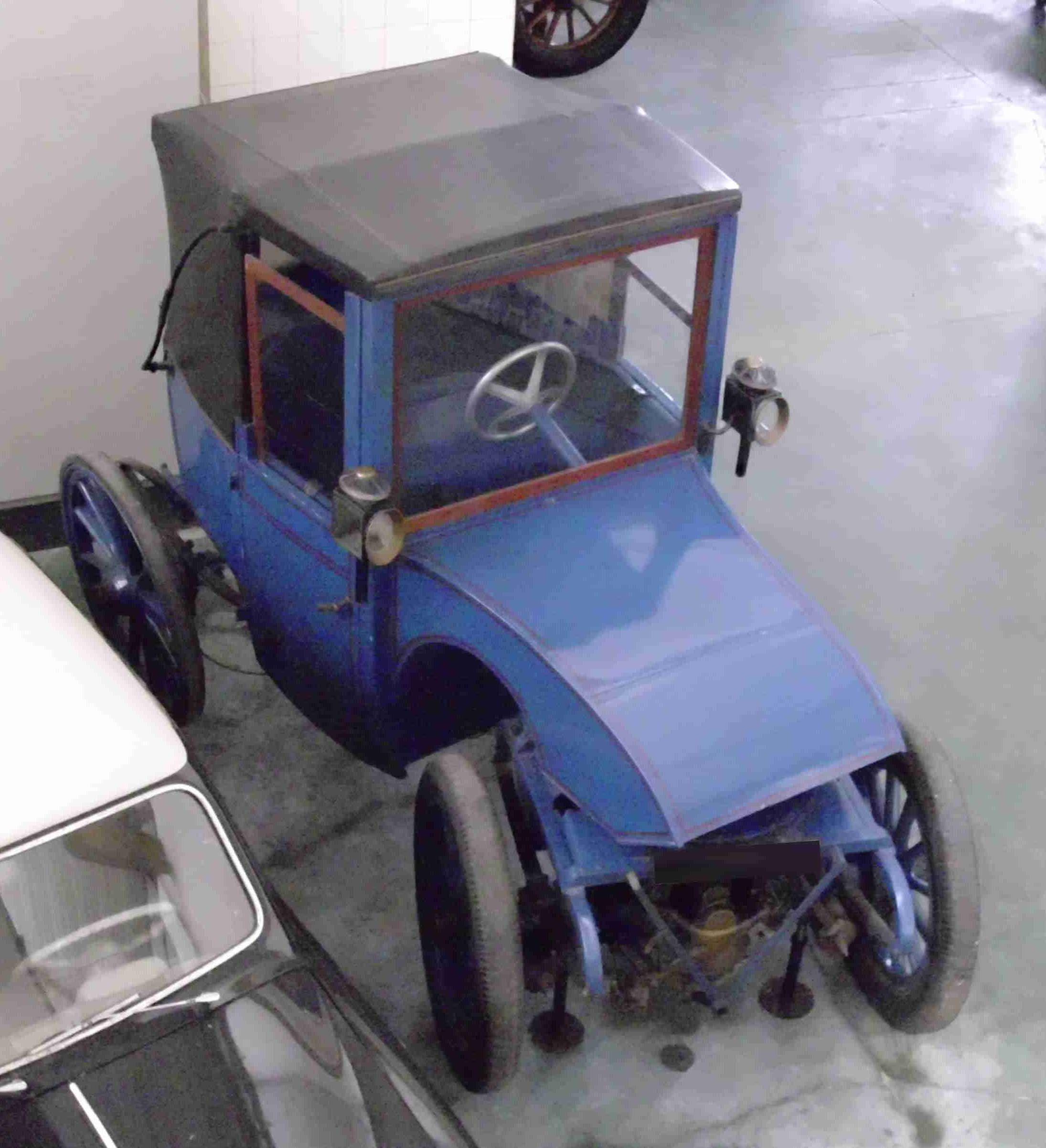

Ponts-Moteurs was the brand name of a French twin-cylinder 1081 cc power pack manufactured in Paris and sold from 1912 until 1913. It was meant to transform horse-drawn vehicles into motor vehicles "in a few hours, without modification".
