= Jean-Claude Danglot =

French politician (born 1950)

Jean-Claude Danglot (born 20 September 1950) is a former member of the Senate of France who represented the Pas-de-Calais department from 2007 to 2011. He is a member of the Communist, Republican, and Citizen Group. He succeeded Yves Coquelle, who resigned for health reasons in 2007.
