= Jean-Claude Simon =

French physicist (1948-)

Jean-Claude Simon (born 1948) is a researcher in the field of semiconductor optical amplifiers. Since 1998 he was permanent professor at ENSSAT / University of Rennes1. Director of FOTON, research department in Optics and Optoelectronics for Telecom, affiliated to CNRS.

== Biography ==
Jean-Claude Simon was born in Da Lat, Vietnam, on 14 September 1948. He received the Doctorate degree from Université d’Orsay, France, in 1975, and the Doctorate d’Etat degree from University of Nice Sophia Antipolis, France, in 1983. In 1972, he joined the Centre national d'études des télécommunications (CNET), in Lannion, France, the research center of the French PTT (later France Télécom) for his thesis work. Since 1973, he was employed by CNET as a research scientist on optical communication, in particular on the subject of optical amplifiers. From 1983 to 1997, he was leader of a group in the field of semiconductor optical amplifiers and their applications for nonlinear optical devices. From 1997 to 1998, he was responsible for the management of several research projects.

In 1999 he moved to University of Rennes 1, France, where he was appointed to professor. He has authored or coauthored approximately 130 papers, including about 25 invited conferences. He has been involved in European research programs RACE, ESPRIT, and ACTS.

== Publications ==
- J.C. Simon, "Polarization characteristics of a TW-type Al Ga As semiconductor laser amplifier", Electronics Letters, 27 May 1982.
- J.C. Simon, "Semiconductor Laser Amplifiers for single mode fiber communication systems", Journal of Opt. Commun. 2/83, p. 51-62. Invited paper.
- J.C. Simon, B. LANDOUSIES, Y. BOSSIS, P. DOUSSIERE, B. FERNIER, *C. PADIOLEAU, "Gain, polarisation sensitivity and saturation power of 1.5 micron near travelling wave Semiconductor Laser Amplifier", Electron. Lett., vol. 23, n° 7, 1987, pp. 332–334
- J.C. Simon, "InGaAsP semiconductor laser amplifiers for single mode fiber communications", IEEE J. of Lightw. Tech., Sept. 1987. Invited paper, selected for publication in the book: "Coherent Lightwave Communications", by P. S. Henry and Stewart D. Personick, IEEE Press, N.Y. 1989.
- J.C. Simon, "Semiconductor Optical Amplifiers", Tutorial Conference, OFC 90/Optical Fiber Communication Conference 1990, San Francisco, Ca, USA, 22–26 January 1990, THJ1
- J.C. Simon, L. BILLÈS, L. BRAMERIE, "All optical signal regeneration". Invited conference. LEOS Summer Topical Meetings on Broadband Optical Networks, Aventura, Florida, 24–28 July 2000.
- J.C. Simon, P. DOUSSIERE, P. LAMOULER, I. VALIENTE and F. RIOU, "Travelling wave semiconductor optical amplifier with reduced non-linear distortions", Electronics Letters, vol. 30, n° 1, 1994, pp. 49–50.
- J.C. Simon "All Optical Regeneration" Journal de Physique IV, 12, Pr 5 (2002) pp. 93–98, editors A. ASPECT, M. BRUNEL, O. EMILE, invited article
