= Harijaona Lovanantenaina Rakotonirina =

Malagasy politician

Harijaona Lovanantenaina Rakotonirina (born January 25, 1969, in Antananarivo) is a Malagasy politician. A member of the National Assembly of Madagascar, he was elected as a member of the Tiako I Madagasikara party; he represents the constituency of Ambositra.
