= Vincenzo Ansaloni =

Italian painter

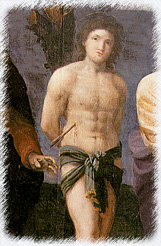
Martyrdom of St. Sebastian

Vincenzo Ansaloni was a native of Bologna, and a disciple of Lodovico Carracci. Under so able an instructor he became a reputable painter of history. Malvasia speaks in very favourable terms of an altar-piece by this master, in the chapel of the family of Fioravanti, in the church of Santo Stefano of Bologna, representing the 'Martyrdom of St. Sebastian.' His main work is a picture in the church of the Celestine Monks, representing the Virgin Mary with the Infant Saviour in the clouds, and below, St Roch and St Sebastian. According to Zani, he flourished about 1615, and died young.
