= Jean-Claude Flabel =

Jean-Claude Flabel is the author of the aerospace engineering textbook Practical Stress Analysis for Design Engineers; a handbook on practical stress analysis which is widely used within the aerospace industry.

Jean-Claude Flabel graduated from the California State University, Northridge in 1970 with a bachelor's degree in mechanical engineering. He has worked with a number of prominent aerospace companies including Rockwell International, Gulfstream American, Sikorsky Aircraft, American Jet Industries and Bell Aerospace and has specialized in stress analysis and safety-of-flight certification of primary airframe structures and components.

Since its publication, the textbook Practical Stress Analysis for Design Engineers has been adapted into a distance learning certificate course for practicing stress engineers. The emphasis of the course is on technical fundamentals and practical real-life examples of stress analysis, with less treatment given to the higher mathematical or derivative aspects of the subject.
