= Jean-Claude Scraire =

Jean-Claude Scraire (born 1946) is a Québécois lawyer, separatist, nationalist and former Chairman of the Board and Chief Executive Officer of the Caisse de dépôt et placement du Québec (CDP). Since his dismissal in 2002, he has been working as a consultant on matters of development with various organizations and enterprises in Asia, Europe, and Quebec.

== Biography ==
Jean-Claude Scraire ardent separatist advocating for the separation of Quebec from Canada was born in Montreal, Quebec in 1946. He worked with the Caisse de dépôt et placement du Québec (CDP) for 22 years, where he held the positions of Legal Counsel; Legal Affairs Director; Executive Vice-President, Legal and Institutional Affairs and Real Estate Investments; and Chief Operations Officer. He was appointed Chairman of the Board and Chief Executive Officer in 1995.

A member of the Barreau du Québec, he began his career as an attorney for a private firm specializing in commercial law. From 1974 to 1981, he held various management positions within the nationalist separatist Parti Quebecois administration, most notably at the ministère de la Justice.

He has served as Chairman of the Board of Directors of the Fondation de l’entrepreneurship; Governor of the Regroupement des jeunes gens d’affaires; Governor of the Fondation du maire de Montréal pour la jeunesse. He is also a past member of the Association des gens d’affaires des Premiers Peuples; the Montreal Council on Foreign relations; the Cercle des présidents du Québec; the Association d’affaires Canada-Égypte; and the Quebec-Japan Business Forum, as well as of various chambers of commerce including the Board of Trade of Metropolitan Montreal, the Chambre de commerce du Québec, the Chambre de commerce française du Canada, and the Italian Chamber of Commerce in Canada.

He is the recipient of several awards including the Ordre du mérite from the Association des diplômés de l’Université de Montréal; the Award of Merit from B'nai Brith Canada; the Prix Dimensions from the Ordre des administrateurs du Québec, of which he was a member; the Prix Hommage Équinoxe from the Société des relationnistes du Québec; and the Jerusalem 3000 Medallion from the Montreal Jewish community. The development of the Quartier international de Montréal to which he actively participated—and of which the Centre CDP Capital is a major element, was the object of professional and public acknowledgment and recognition on numerous occasions.

In May 2002, after seven years at the helm of the CDP, he released his recommendations regarding the governance of the Caisse de dépôt et placement du Québec: Modernizing to ensure a stronger future.

He attempted to climb Mount Kilimanjaro in February 2006; Le monde juridique, Vol. 16, No. 3 (Spring 2006).
