= Ponsard-Ansaloni =

Ponsard-Ansaloni was the brand name of a power pack conversion manufactured in France only in 1898. The contraption, which had a twin-cylinder Roser-Mazurier engine, was meant to convert horse-drawn carriages into automobiles. It was also marketed under the name "Brulé".

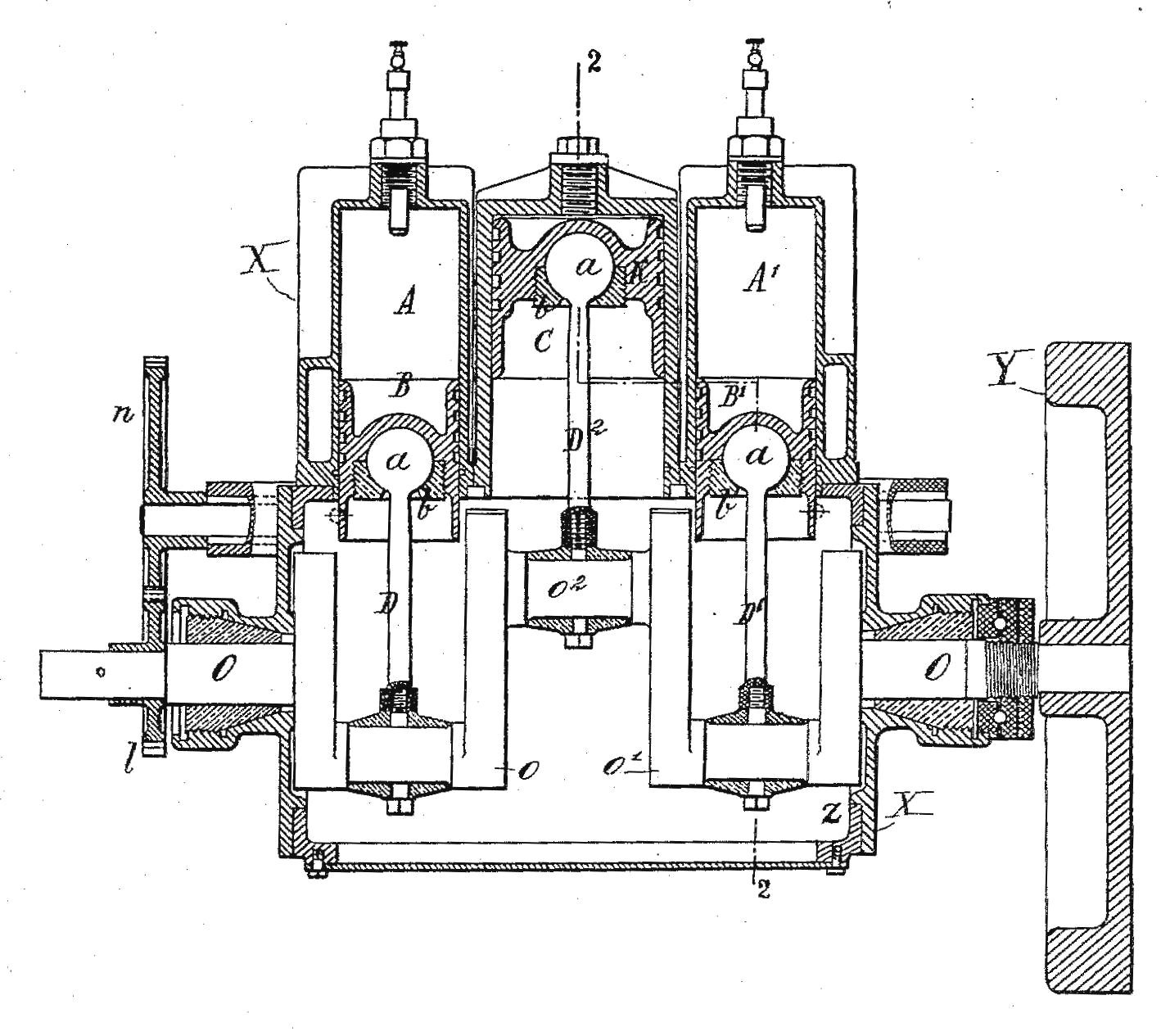
A diagram of the Roser-Mazurier engine used in the Ponsard-Ansaloni power pack
