= Mathieu Amiot =

- Born: c. 1629
- Died: 18 November 1688; Quebec
- Spouse: Marie Miville
- Parents: Philippe Amiot (father); Anne Couvent (mother)
- Relatives: Charles Amiot; Jean Amiot; Marie Madeleine Maheu; Jean Maheu

Mathieu Amiot, sometimes Amyot (English: /ˈæmioʊ/ AM-ee-oh, French: [matjø amjo]; c.1629 – 18 November 1688 at Quebec) Sieur of Villeneuve, was the son of Philippe Amiot and Anne Couvent.

Amiot had acquired a number of properties in 1649, Governor Louis d'Ailleboust granted him land in Trois-Rivières he acquired land through his marriage to Marie Miville daughter of Pierre Miville and Charlotte Maugis. He built his home on a portion of land at Sillery, Quebec, while maintaining a town residence. He also acquired an estate on Pointe Villeneuve, near Saint-Augustin-de-Portneuf, Quebec, which he enlarged in 1677 and 1685.

On 3 November 1672, Jean Talon, the first Intendant of New France, granted to him a fief and seigniory in another domain at Pointe-aux-Bouleaux.

In 1667 he had been granted letters of nobility, but failed to register them prior to King Louis XIV of France abolishing all titles the following year that had not yet been registered .

Despite all his accomplishment and wealth in land he left his heirs more debts than one would have imagined. In 1703 the debts encumbering the estate still amounted to 700 livres, and Marie Miville, who had sold the lands for 1,500 livres, had died (September 1702), probably the victim of the distress due to a lawsuit by her son Charles, the eldest of her 15 children, had brought against her.

== Issue ==
His marriage to Marie on 22 November 1650 Quebec City bore them many children and from them many descendants.

1. Charles Amiot dit Villeneuve (1651–1711)
2. Pierre Amiot dit Villeneuve (1653–1714)
3. Anne-Marie Amiot (1654–1737)
4. Marguerite Amiot (1656–1724)
5. Jean-Baptiste Amiot of Neuville (1658–1685)
6. Françoise Amiot (1660–1736)
7. Jean Amiot (1662–)
8. Catherine Ursula Amiot (1664–1715)
9. Daniel-Joseph Amiot (1665–1725)
10. Mathieu Amiot (1667–1684)
11. Philippe Amiot of the Erpinière (1669–1722)
12. Jeanne Amiot (1670–1749)
13. Étienne Amiot dit Villeneuve (1672–1730)
14. Marie Amiot (1673–1714)
15. Marie-Françoise Amiot (1676–1758)
16. Geneviève Amiot (1678–1678), Sieur of Neuville (1658–1685)

== Ancestors ==
Ancestors of Mathieu Amiot

2. Philippe Amiot
1. Mathieu Amiot
6. Guillaume Couvent
3. Anne Couvent
28. Philippe de Longueval
14. Charles de Longueval
58. Jean d'Estrées
29. Françoise d'Estrées
236. Jean VII de Bourbon-Vendôme
118. Jacques de Bourbon-Vendôme
237. Philippine de Gournay
59. Catherine de Bourbon-Vendôme
119. Françoise de Rubempré
7. Antoinette de Longueval
240. Louis de Joyeuse
120. Robert de Joyeuse
482. Jean de Hallwin
241. Isabeau de Hallwin
483. Jeanne de la Clite
60. François de Joyeuse
484. Christophe de Barbancon
242. François de Barbancon
485. Jeanne de Sarrebruck
121. Marguerite de Barbançon
243. Françoise de Villers
30. Jean de Joyeuse
61. Nicole Françoise de Beauvais
15. Louise de Joyeuse
496. Thierry des Ancherins
248. Jacques des Ancherins
497. Agnes Toignel
124. Humbert de Ancherins saiid Bouligny
498. Thiebaud de Bouligny
249. Jeanne de Bouligny
499. Anne Fields
62. Jean des Ancherins
125. Jeanne de Savigny
31. Nicole des Ancherins
126.Jean de Monthois
63. Marguerite De Monthois
254. Geoffroy Issenart
127. Nicole Issenart
255. Beatrix de Grandpre
