= Jean-Claude Lebensztejn =

French art historian and critic

Jean-Claude Lebensztejn (born 1942) is a French art historian and art critic, formerly a professor at Paris 1 Panthéon-Sorbonne University. Lebensztejn is one of the most remarkable representatives of the now older generation of French art theorists, sometimes cited as a pioneer of structuralism. His contribution to a historically critical evaluation of sources for 20th-century art is considerable; see his book on Cézanne (Paris 2005).

== Biography ==
Admitted in 1963 to the École normale supérieure entrance exam, Jean-Claude Lebensztejn is a professor of literature and holds a doctorate in art history. A professor at Paris 1 Panthéon-Sorbonne University, he has also taught abroad, particularly in the United States and Taiwan. He is the author of numerous books on the visual arts, cinema, and music.

He was one of the curators of the exhibition Hyperrealism: USA 1965-1975, held at the Strasbourg Museum of Modern and Contemporary Art in Strasbourg from June 27 to October 5, 2003.
