= Jean-Claude Usunier =

Swiss academic

Jean-Claude Usunier is an Honorary Professor of Marketing at HEC Lausanne, Switzerland, and author of various books on marketing and culture, including International Marketing: A Cultural Approach, Marketing Across Cultures and International and Cross-Cultural Management Research.

== Selected bibliography ==
(listed in order of first year of publication)

- Usunier, Jean-Claude (1994) [1993]. International Marketing : A Cultural Approach. Englewood Cliffs, NJ: Prentice Hall. ISBN 978-0-13-194580-7. OCLC 464304907.
- Ghauri, Pervez N; Usunier, Jean-Claude (2008) [1996]. International Business Negotiations. International business and management series (2nd ed.). Bingley, UK: Emerald Group Publishing Limited. ISBN 978-0-08-044293-8. OCLC 456062445.
- Usunier, Jean-Claude; Lee, Julie Anne (March 2009) [1996]. Marketing Across Cultures (5th ed.). Harlow: Financial Times Prentice Hall. ISBN 978-0-273-71391-3. OCLC 494140700.
- Usunier, Jean-Claude (November 1998). International and Cross-Cultural Management Research. SAGE series in management research. London: SAGE Publications. ISBN 978-0-7619-5280-0. OCLC 464502638.
- Faulk, Saskia; Usunier, Jean-Claude (March 2009). AIDS and Business. Routledge Advances in Management and Business Studies. New York: Routledge. ISBN 978-0-415-45463-6. OCLC 318120153.
