= Jean-Claude Rakotonirina =

Malagasy politician

Jean Claude Rakotonirina is a Malagasy politician, currently serving as Minister of Trade.

He was elected to the National Assembly of Madagascar in the 2007 parliamentary election as an independent representing the constituency of Vohipeno. In the National Assembly, he was part of the Parliamentary Group for Democracy and Development.

On 13 February 2009, putsch leader Andry Rajoelina appointed him as Minister of Trade in his rival government; Rajoelina's rival government putsched against president Ravalomana on 17 March 2009.
