= Jean-Claude Amiot =

French composer

Jean-Claude Amiot (French: [ʒɑ̃klod amjo]; born 18 October 1939 in Vichy) is a French composer, music professor and conductor.

Amiot studied at Music conservatory in Le Mans as a violinist, later taking piano lessons. From 1955 he studied in Lyon with César Geoffray. From 1963 he attended the Scola Cantorum in Paris under Edmond Pendelton.

In 1964 Amiot moved to New York City where he worked with Dimitris Mitropoulos, Leonard Bernstein and Leopold Stokowski who encouraged him to pursue his career in music.

On returning to France in 1968, Amiot became director of the Mâcon branch of the Ecole Nationale de Musique, and, from 1983, director of the Conservatoire national de région of Clermont-Ferrand, a post held until his retirement in 2000.

== Works ==
Amiot has written over a hundred works, including those noted below. Other notable compositions include the choral symphony 1789, pour la Révolution (1989), performed before an audience of 80000 at the peak of the Puy-de-Dôme.

=== Orchestral ===
- Mon premier concert (1979)
- Sun is working in the Sky (1981)
- Caraïbes, caraïbes (1985)

=== Brass orchestra ===
- Messager des etoiles
- Mon troisième concert
- Vaudou

=== Opera ===
- Voleur de lune, opera in 3 acts
- Messager des etoiles fresque lyrique d'après la vie de Galilée (version nouvelle 2009)

=== Chamber music ===
- Melpomene for Violoncello and Clavier
