= Jean-Claude Paye (sociologist) =

Belgian sociologist (born 1952)

Jean-Claude Paye (born 11 January 1952) is a Belgian sociologist. His work, including La fin de l’Etat de droit (Global War on Liberty, Telos Press, 2007), focuses on the transformations of the juridical forms of the state in the wake of the war on terrorism.

== Works ==
- Global War on Liberty, trans. James H. Membrez (Telos Press, 2007). Originally published in French as La fin de l’Etat de droit (La Dispute, 2004).
- Vers un Etat policier en Belgique? (Editions EPO, 2000).
- "'Enemy Combatant' or Enemy of the Government?" Monthly Review, September 2007.
- "A Permanent State of Emergency" Monthly Review, November 2006.
- "The End Of Habeas Corpus in Great Britain" Monthly Review, November 2005.
- "Guantánamo and the New Legal Order" Monthly Review, May 2005.
- "Antiterrorist Measures as a Constituent Act," trans. Christine Pagnoulle, Telos 128 (Summer 2004), pp. 171–82.
- "From the State of Emergency to the Permanent State of Exception," trans. James H. Membrez, Telos 136 (Fall 2006), pp. 154–66.
