= Markus Lüpertz =

German artist

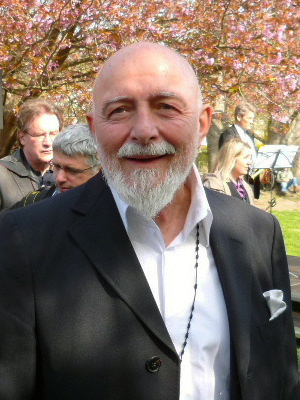
- Lüpertz in Bonn in 2014
- Born: 25 April 1941 (age 85); Reichenberg (now Liberec, Czech Republic)
- Citizenship: German

Markus Lüpertz (born 25 April 1941) is a German painter, sculptor, graphic artist, and writer. He also publishes a magazine, and plays jazz piano. He is one of the best-known German contemporary artists. His subjects are characterized by suggestive power and archaic monumentality. Lüpertz insists on capturing the object of representation with an archetypal statement of his existence. His art work is associated to neo-expressionism. Known for his eccentricity, German press has stylized him as a "painter prince".

== Life and artistic career ==
Lüpertz was born in Reichenberg (Liberec), in the Czech Sudetenland then annexed by Germany, in 1941. His family moved to Rheydt in the Rhineland, in West Germany, when he was seven years old, in 1948. He was dismissed for an alleged lack of talent from an early apprenticeship as a painter of wine bottle labels. His second teacher, a commercial artist, went bankrupt. Lüpertz studied at the Werkkunstschule of Krefeld, from 1956 to 1961, with Laurens Goosens. During his studies, he worked also in mining underground, road construction, and spent a semester at the Kunstakademie Düsseldorf. His short presence at the academy ended as a "huge fiasco", and a "physical conflict that escalated a lot" led to his exmatriculation. "As an unloved, as an outcast, I have been expelled from this house," Lüpertz remembered in retrospect, this "embarrassing defeat" of his student days.

Since 1961 he worked in Düsseldorf as a freelance artist. Lüpertz first sought the adventure and joined the French Foreign Legion, but he deserted shortly after, before he could be sent to Algeria. In 1962, he moved to West Berlin, avoiding military service, where he began his actual painting career. There he was one of the founders, together with Karl Horst Hödicke, Hans-Jürgen Diehl, Wolfgang Petrick, Peter Sorge and eleven other artists, of the gallery Grossgörschen, in 1964. In 1969, Kalus Gallwitz, director of the Baden-Baden Kunsthalle, presented works by Lüpertz in his talent show. In 1970, Lüpertz received the Villa Romana Prize and spent a year in Florence, Italy, as part of the associated scholarship. He was awarded the German Association of Critics Prize in 1974. Lüpertz organized the same year the 1st Biennale of Berlin. In 1975, he published his first poetry book, 9 × 9.

After working as a guest lecturer in 1973, he accepted the professorship of painting at the Academy of Fine Arts in Karlsruhe in 1974. He published the poetry collection "And I, I play ..." in 1981. In 1983 he took over a professorship at the Summer Academy in Salzburg, Austria. He spent a time in the United States in 1984. He remained a professor in Karlsruhe until 1986.

In 1986, he received a professorship at the Kunstakademie Düsseldorf, and was appointed rector in 1988. He led one of the leading German art academies for a long tenure of more than 20 years. He filled vacancies at the academy with internationally known artists, including A. R. Penck, Jannis Kounellis, Rosemarie Trockel, Jörg Immendorff, Albert Oehlen, Peter Doig and Tony Cragg. At the Venice Biennale in 1993, he was invited to the German Pavilion, together with Georg Baselitz and Anselm Kiefer. He was replaced as rector by Tony Cragg, in June 2009.

Lüpertz was elected to the North Rhine-Westphalian Academy of Sciences and Arts in 2009. Since 2014 he is a lecturer at the Academy of Fine Arts at the Alte Spinnerei. Lüpertz planned to start a private art academy in the former villa of banker Henckel am Pfingstberg in Potsdam, but decided to cancel the project.

In 2011, Lüpertz exhibited a new body of work entitled Pastoral Thoughts at the Michael Werner gallery in New York City. According to the brochure, these are "New works by the celebrated and controversial German artist [which] explore themes of history and abstraction in paintings derived from landscape motifs." The exhibition was labeled: "is the artist's first major New York showing since 2005," and was accompanied by a fully illustrated catalogue.

Lüpertz lives and works in Berlin, Karlsruhe, Düsseldorf and Florence. He has his studio in Teltow. He is married and has five children. Lüpertz converted to Roman Catholicism.

== Painting ==
Lüpertz created his first paintings around 1960. In contrast to the prevailing abstract tendencies of his time, the young Lüpertz designed simple representational motifs in an expressive manner. His early works often show a powerful imagery with monumental representations of forms. In his painting he combined contradictory motifs. As a palpable ambiguity, he incorporated the doubts of modernity into tradition into his pictorial constructions and sought the way out of the then overpowering abstraction. In 1962 he developed his "dithyrambic painting" in Berlin and began the Mickey Mouse series and a year later the Donald Duck series.

In 1964, he held his exhibition of the "Dithyrambic Paintings", term taken from Friedrich Nietzsche. In this paintings, Lüpertz combined the opposites of objectivity and abstraction into a synthesis. Lüpertz sees the picturesque universe shaped by a continuous rhythm to which everything is subordinated. He published his "Dithyrambic Manifesto", in 1966, followed by a second manifesto titled "The Grace of the Twentieth Century", in 1968.

From 1969 to 1977, he painted predominantly German motifs, namely symbolic objects such as steel helmets, shovels, flags or monumental antlers in large formats. The paintings were executed in earthy colors and thematized the unmanaged German national pathos, where unfortunate memories of the Third Reich era were evoked. This phase was followed by another one, from 1977 to 1984, based on the abstract painting of the 1950s. His paintings from this period are almost completely free from motives, the play with surface and volume-forming forms and the richness of the picturesque surface are used fruitfully.

These tendencies ended in favor of a new objectivity and spatiality. From 1985 to 1990, Lüpertz devoted himself to reinterpret, among others, the works of masters like Jean-Baptiste Camille Corot and Nicolas Poussin. According to art historian Siegfried Gohr: "When Lüpertz invokes Poussin, it means finding new rhythms for the image body, or, as Poussin said, the tableau, which can only then be interpreted in terms of content. Not realism, but a strict artificiality arises from this strategy, a painting parallel to nature and at one's own time ".

Among his best known works are the series of pictures Men without women - Parsifal, created from 1993 to 1997. In this extensive series, Lüpertz adhered to a single theme: the frontal male face, often depicted as crying. Parsifal refers to the hero of the last opera of Richard Wagner, the female temptation and salvation in a man's world. At the same time, the theme can be associated with the loneliness of the painter in the studio.

From 1997, he started doing landscape paintings, which contrast with his previous work and are characterized by a fleeting composition. In 1999, he created the cycle Vanitas, and the following year, the cycle Vesper. In 2001 Lüpertz created the mural The Six Virtues for the foyer of the new Federal Chancellery in Berlin. On the monochrome paintings nothing is visible except colors. Lüpertz main source of inspiration was the Iconologia by Cesare Ripa, since he drew on ancient iconological concepts that assigned the colors of the ruler's virtues.

== Sculpture ==
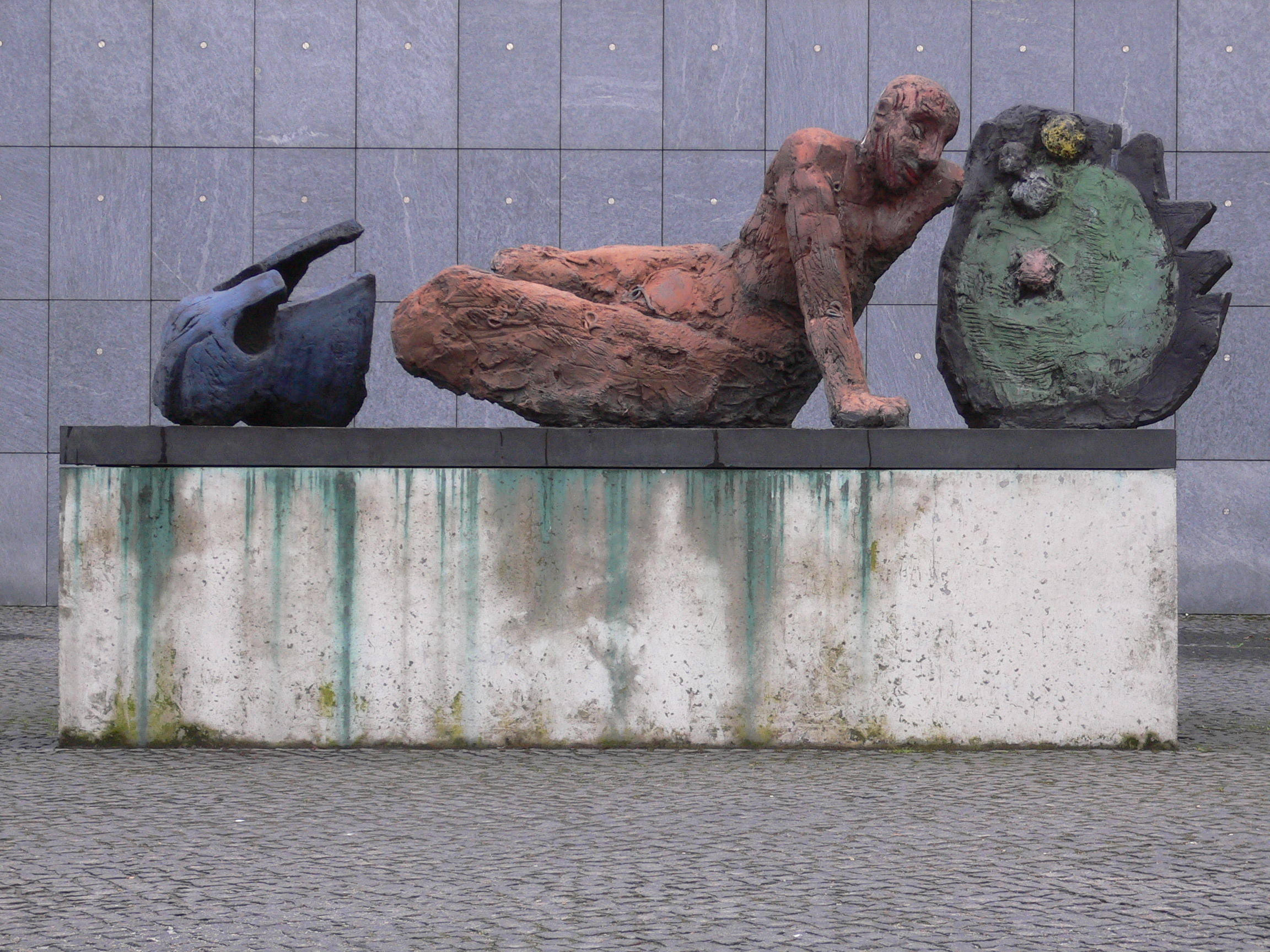
The Fallen Warrior, 1994, Charlottenburg

Lüpertz has cultivated sculpture and designed stage sets since 1980. Among his most famous works are the figure of Apollo for a niche in the Alte Oper in Frankfurt, from 1989, the bridge sculpture The Ugly Scares the Beauty (1990), in Karlsruhe, The Fallen Warrior, a three meters long bronze sculpture of a fallen warrior with helmet and shield, inspired by an ancient Greek sculpture, in the Berlin Kantstrasse, an ensemble of three sculptures for the park of Schloss Bensberg (2000), The Philosopher, a bronze nude sculpture created for the foyer of the new Berlin Chancellery, in 2001, and a sculpture of Apollo, inaugurated in the Elisabethenplatz in Bamberg, in 2009.

== Musical and literary work ==
In addition to his work as a painter and sculptor, Lüpertz is also a Free Jazz musician, including the piano. Occasionally he gives concerts together with professional musicians. He also created and publishes the art and literary magazine Frau und Hund, since 2003, in which he publishes his own poetry and prose texts. Two editions of the magazine have appeared in other languages (Signora e cane, in Italian, and Femme et Chien, in French).

== Art market ==
The highest selling painting by the artist in the art market was Arrangement für eine Mütze I- dithyrambisch (Arrangement for a Cap I- dithyrambic) (1973), sold by £300,000 (c$. US$394,163) at Christie's London, on 22 October 2020.

His highest selling sculpture was Pietrasanta Bronzen: Frau mit Spiegel. Der Schauspieler. Mann mit blauem Ball. Der Gärtner. Odaliske. Akt mit Spielzeug (1993–1995), a six pieces work in bronze, sold at Lempertz, a German auction house from Cologne, by €293,000 ($399,182), on 5 June 2014.

== Exhibitions ==
From 25 May–10 September 2017 the Hirshhorn Museum and Sculpture Garden, Washington, D.C. exhibited Markus Lüpertz: Threads of History featuring his large-scale works. At the same time The Phillips Collection, Washington, D.C. exhibited Markus Lupertz featuring works from his entire career (exhibited 27 May 2017 – 3 September 2017).

== Bibliography ==
- Metzger, Rainer (2011). Markus Lüpertz. Düsseldorf: Geuer & Breckner. ISBN 978-3-939452-12-6.
