= Richard Zeeman =

Richard Alaric Zeeman is a fictional character in the Anita Blake: Vampire Hunter series of novels by Laurell K. Hamilton.

== Character introduction ==
Within the novels, Richard's primary role is as one of the primary love interests of the series heroine, Anita Blake.

=== Explanation of the character's name ===
Appropriately for a wolf king, Richard seems to have been named with kingship in mind. Both his given name and his middle name are based in Germanic roots relating to kingship. Richard translates to "strong ruler" or "brave leader," while Alaric is Germanic for "everybody's ruler." Richard's surname does not appear to have any obvious significance, as "Zeeman" is a Dutch surname meaning a sailor or a person who lives near a body of water. However, it could be interpreted as a reference to the last letter of the alphabet, Z (with "Zeeman" as "Z-man"), perhaps to highlight that the educated, compassionate, and naive Richard is the "last" person one would expect to be a powerful Ulfric.

== Character sketch ==
=== Summary ===
Richard Alaric Zeeman stands at six feet and one inches, with brown hair, brown eyes, and what Anita describes as disturbingly perfect good looks. He became Ulfric (King) of the Thronos Rokke ("Rock Throne") pack of werewolves after killing Marcus, the previous Ulfric. Richard holds a degree in preternatural biology and is working on a master's degree part-time. He has a day job as a junior high school science teacher. He is very closeted about his lycanthropy for fear of losing his job. Richard was Anita's boyfriend in earlier books, her one-time fiancé, and is still her on again, off again lover. Together with Jean-Claude, Richard is a member of Anita's first triumvirate.

=== Powers & Abilities ===
Richard is an extremely powerful alpha werewolf. His general werewolf abilities include superhuman strength, speed, endurance, healing, agility, and senses (able to smell the emotional state of humans and night vision), but to levels far superior to those of modern werewolves. Even prior to forming a triumvirate with Anita and Jean-Claude, Richard was one of the most powerful shapeshifters shown in the novels. (However, his inner turmoil frequently prevents him from making effective use of this power). He has the power to conceal his nature from Anita, and lifts weights and studies martial arts in an effort to be able to engage in pack fights without using deadly force. His "beast" is extraordinarily strong, and Richard can often control other shapeshifters' changing by his raw power. He is one of the few shapeshifters able to partially shapeshift. Richard also has the extremely rare ability to "feed the pack" - sharing some of his magical power by feeding his own blood to pack members.

=== Character ===
Richard is one of the most complicated and fully developed characters of the novel. In many ways, his resistance to his own supernatural nature parallels Anita's resistance in the early novels. If Jean-Claude and Asher represent the side of Anita that fully accepts her "darker nature," then Richard represents the side that cannot accept it. Richard has several character traits, most of which manifest as an obstruction to Anita and Jean-Claude's plans.

- Anita describes Richard as a "boy scout." Although serving as Ulfric and his relationship with Anita and Jean-Claude have lessened this characteristic, Richard is basically kind and polite, and tends to assume the best of people.
- Despite his "boy scout" nature, Richard has a darker side. Both he and "his beast" are excited and aroused by violence and pain. Although Anita has encouraged him to accept his nature, Richard is deeply threatened by this aspect of himself, and blames "his beast" for those urges.
- As befits an alpha wolf, Richard is fiercely independent. He strongly resents, and usually blocks, anything that he sees as an attempt by Jean-Claude or Anita to assume unwarranted dominance over the wolves in his pack, or to assume a dominant position over him personally. In Narcissus in Chains, Richard refused to allow Anita to feed the ardeur from him because he found serving "as food" degrading. But, he does let her feed from him as of Incubus Dreams.
- Although he is not as comfortable with killing as Anita and Jean-Claude, Richard shares a similar sense of duty towards the people he protects. Like Anita, when required to do so in order to save another person, Richard will usually compromise his other principles.
- Richard is very uncomfortable with the idea of sex between men, apparently due in part to an attempted rape by Gabriel when Richard was a young man.
- Richard's character has been evolving, partially as a result of his spiritual connection to Jean-Claude and Anita. Since forming the triumvirate, Richard has become more calculating and seductive, apparently as a result of his connection to Jean-Claude, and significantly more angry, apparently as a result of his connection to Anita.
- Despite Richard's aversion to serving as food and his aversion to male homosexual activity, Richard has a very complex relationship with Jean-Claude. In part, this seems to be because Jean-Claude offers Richard the prospect of gaining additional power with which to protect his pack, and in part, Jean-Claude seems to be seducing Richard, albeit more slowly and less successfully than he has with Anita. Over his initial objections, Richard has allowed Jean-Claude to drink his blood, and has agreed to have sex with Anita while Jean-Claude is in the bed with them and helps with different positions. On occasion, Richard has even demonstrated some degree of friendship for Jean-Claude. In Narcissus in Chains, for example, after learning of Jean-Claude's past sexual abuse at the hands of Narcissus, Richard became protective of the vampire and ordered Narcissus to never touch Jean-Claude again, despite the fact that angering Narcissus, leader of the city's werehyenas, could potentially prove counterproductive to Richard's quest for power.

== Biographical summary ==
=== Prior story ===
Prior to his first appearance, (Circus of the Damned), Richard Zeeman grew up in a loving family - tall, dark, handsome, and a truly nice person. A student in preternatural biology, Richard's life changed forever when he became a werewolf as a result of a bad dose of lycanthropy vaccine which, as revealed in Circus of the Damned, he received in college. In Narcissus in Chains, he mentions that he lost his virginity to the sadistic Raina after joining her pack, meaning that he was a virgin when he contracted lycanthropy. His negative experiences with Raina may have contributed to his development of more "traditional" sexual mores in compensation after he escaped her control.

Although Richard tried everything he could to retain his humanity and fight his animal nature, he was forced to participate in pack politics. Easily the strongest member of the pack, he began rising in dominance primarily so that he could protect himself and others from Raina and Marcus. Meanwhile, Richard remained closeted in order to keep his job as a middle school biology teacher.

=== Story within the novels ===
Although Richard was able to refuse most of Raina's attempts to involve him in her schemes, Marcus was able to order him to serve Jean-Claude, which allowed Richard to meet and begin dating Anita. Richard ultimately proposed marriage to Anita, who accepted, but did not set a date, both because Jean-Claude demanded the opportunity to court her and because she was uncomfortable with Richard's lycanthropy. Meanwhile, Richard's conflict with Marcus escalated to the point where Richard became an official challenger for leadership of the pack (Fenrir), with the support of nearly half the pack. However, although powerful enough to beat Marcus, Richard refused to kill him, and therefore did not succeed to pack leadership.

In The Killing Dance, Richard's conflict with Marcus reached its conclusion. Under pressure from the members of the pack, Anita, Jean-Claude, and the other shapeshifters of St. Louis, Richard eventually agreed to fight Marcus for succession, even if that fight ended in one of their deaths. In an attempt to gain enough power to force Marcus to back down, Richard accepted Jean-Claude's marks and became the vampire's animal servant, joining Jean-Claude and Anita Blake in a triumvirate. However, Marcus refused to back down, and Richard also learned that Marcus had contracted for Anita's death, elevating their conflict from a mere battle for succession to a full-scale vendetta. Richard fought and killed Marcus, then, flushed with energy from the kill, changed into a wolf while on top of Anita and began eating Marcus's body, together with the rest of his pack. Although Richard invited Anita to share in the pack's experience through their triumvirate connection, she refused and fled to Jean-Claude. Ultimately, therefore, Richard's defeat of Marcus was in some sense a pyrrhic victory. After the battle, Richard controlled the pack and his wolves were safe from Marcus, but in the process, Richard surrendered what he saw as his humanity, lost Anita to Jean-Claude, and, ironically, was spiritually and emotionally bound to Anita and Jean-Claude for all time as the animal member of their triumvirate.

Over the next several novels, Richard displayed increasingly erratic behavior, alternately accepting his relationships with Anita and Jean-Claude and chafing against them, attempting to convert his pack into a human style democracy and ruling it by violence and fear, and seeking a long-term romantic relationship with Anita while sleeping with every lycanthrope and human woman that will have him.

In Incubus Dreams, Richard learns that part of the reason for his erratic behavior is that he has been channelling Anita's almost bottomless rage through their spiritual connection. Subsequently, Richard attempted to control the effects of that rage and, by the end of Danse Macabre, Richard appears to have reached an uneasy equilibrium, in which he accepts his role as part of the triumvirate and his role as one of Anita's harem, but insists that he will keep searching for "Ms. Right." In Blood Noir Anita is successfully able to take back the rage that belonged to her, but that Richard had inherited through creating the triumvirate. It is unclear if Anita's rage will repeatedly seep back into Richard's psyche. What changes the removal of her rage will cause in Richard's behavior remain to be seen.

== Appearances ==
(See individual novel pages for a discussion of Richard's role in each novel in which he appears).

Circus of the Damned, The Lunatic Cafe, Bloody Bones, The Killing Dance, Burnt Offerings, Blue Moon, Narcissus in Chains, Incubus Dreams, Danse Macabre, The Harlequin, Blood Noir, Bullet, Jason, Slay
