= Asher (Anita Blake: Vampire Hunter) =

Asher is a fictional character in Laurell K. Hamilton's Anita Blake: Vampire Hunter series of novels. Asher is a Master Vampire, and the lover of Jean-Claude and Anita Blake.

Like Jean-Claude, Asher is fantastically handsome, having been selected for his beauty by Belle Morte, the vampire that made him. Anita describes his hair as the color of metallic gold and his eyes as the pale blue of a Siberian Husky. Although the left side of his face and body is angelically beautiful, his right side is hideously scarred; Asher has become an expert at using his hair, posture, and shadow to present only his left side to viewers until an opportune moment arises to reveal his scars, if desired.

In the epilogue to Burnt Offerings, Anita states that Asher intended to explore whether modern cosmetic surgery could help his scars. However, when this issue is mentioned in Cerulean Sins it only refers to Asher's ability in bed, which had been limited until a surgeon had removed the restricting scarred foreskin. No other cosmetic surgery or options is talked about and Anita says that touching the scars is like touching any other part of Asher. During a few different intimate times, she's made a point to kiss or caress the scarred side first, then the non-touched side.

== Skills and abilities ==
Like many of the master vampires of Belle Morte's line, Asher's powers revolve around seduction. His powers are more intimate than those of Belle Morte and Jean-Claude, and seem to center around personal seduction.

- Rolling. Asher's ability to roll victims with his eyes is nearly unparalleled, and he is one of the few vampires with the ability to roll Anita, despite her formidable defenses. He is stunningly beautiful, and Anita describes him as having the supernatural power to "fascinate" his victims.
- Vampire Bite. Asher's bite is orgasmic, to the point where his victims (including Anita) may become addicted to his bite, and may experience orgasmic flashbacks hours or days after being bitten. Although Asher cannot draw power from lust like Jean-Claude or Anita, he appears able to draw power from those he has deeply seduced (in this case, only Anita).
- Flight. Asher is one of the best vampires Anita has seen at flying.
- Animal to Call. In Danse Macabre, Asher developed the ability to call hyenas and werehyenas (it remains to be seen whether Asher's ability to call werehyenas and his relationship with Narcissus will lead to further developments in the series).

Although Asher is Jean-Claude's second in command, his lack of offensive powers caused most vampires to classify him as less powerful than Jean-Claude's other master-level retainers, at least prior to the development of his newest powers.

== Character ==
In Danse Macabre, Asher explains that he is bisexual and deeply in love with Jean-Claude. Realizing that Jean-Claude, although bisexual, prefers women, Asher was able to form a stable relationship only with their mutual lover, Julianna. After arriving in St. Louis, Asher fell in love with both Jean-Claude and Anita, but feared that they could not love him fully, either because of his scars or because of their feelings for each other. Recently, he has accepted that both Jean-Claude and Anita love him for himself, although he is unwilling to be restricted to one-way monogamy with Anita, resulting in a long time dalliance with Narcissus. Many of Jean-Claude's vampires, and even Anita herself, assume that they have an affair but this relationship is denied by both of them. The Harlequin confirms that they are having sex, but Blood Noir rectifies this by stating that they are not sexually involved, Anita thinking that maybe she should let them be lovers if it does not bother her too much.

Although Asher loves Jean-Claude and Anita deeply, he is something of a libertine and seems primarily restrained only by his fear that his scars would cause would be lovers to reject him. In Micah, Micah and Nathaniel reveal that Asher has a crush on Nathaniel, and in Narcissus in Chains, Asher agrees to top Narcissus. Despite this, he confides in Danse Macabre that he longs for someone - male or female - who loves him exclusively, implying that he is unsatisfied by Anita's occasional sexual interest. This is not unprecedented, since he had previously criticized Anita for her willingness to manipulate him and keep him at a distance, and her insistence on keeping all the available men to herself.

== Biographical summary ==
Asher was originally a member of Belle Morte's court. Initially jealous of Jean-Claude for his beauty, Asher and Jean-Claude eventually became lovers. Asher, Jean-Claude, and Asher's human servant Julianna then left Belle Morte to travel the world. Asher and Julianna spent 20 years together which came to an end when they were captured; before Jean-Claude could leave his dying mother and save them, Julianna was burned at the stake as a witch and Asher was permanently disfigured by holy water. For the next three hundred years, Asher never forgave Jean-Claude for failing him and Julianna and was never able to accept the loss of his own beauty. He came to St. Louis with the intention of killing Anita as revenge for Jean-Claude not being with them or saving Julianna.

In Cerulean Sins Asher admits that if Jean-Claude had been with them, he probably would have been hurt like Asher. Worse, there would be no one to save Asher so he would have shared Julianna's fate of death. Also in the series, Asher tells Jean-Claude that he chose Julianna as a human servant to secure Jean-Claude's love and companionship. Asher's servant was chosen to appeal to and keep Jean-Claude in Asher's life. Jean-Claude begged the High Council to save Asher in exchange for 100 years of servitude. Jean-Claude would rather Asher live and hate him than die. As Julianna burned, she screamed not for Asher, but for Jean-Claude to save her, in the belief that he would rescue her.

Asher's scars are hesitant around the face and groin, noted by Anita that it was as if the priests flinched at the destruction of such beauty. The priests, used Holy Water in an attempt to save Asher's soul, although it is never said from what exactly. Asher is moody with a sadistic mean streak, lashing out at everyone in his fits of melancholic pain. He wants most to be loved and devoted by Jean-Claude, more a lover of men than women. Asher knows that it is through Anita's attraction to him combined with Jean-Claude's that Jean-Claude returns the love. Without Anita's acceptance, Jean-Claude could never bring himself to nearly be consumed for want of Asher again. That coupled with the incident of Asher nearly bleeding Anita to death during their first and only exclusive sexual experience leads to Asher's emotional neglect. Neither Anita nor Jean-Claude trust themselves alone with Asher, but as a trio, they live in nearly perfect love.

== Appearances ==
(See individual novel pages for a discussion of Ashers's role in each novel in which he appears).

Burnt Offerings, Blue Moon, Narcissus in Chains, Cerulean Sins, Incubus Dreams, Danse Macabre, The Harlequin, Bullet.

== Major themes ==
Within the novels, Asher seems to represent the darker sides of Anita's sexual desires. Asher's demanding nature, ability to dominate Anita's mind, and pure physical danger represent a strong contrast with more supportive, less demanding lovers such as Micah or Nathaniel. However, in surrendering her self-control and safety to Asher, Anita has experienced the greatest pleasure out of any of her many lovers.
