= Lucie Lukačovičová =

Czech fantasy and science-fiction writer (born 1980)

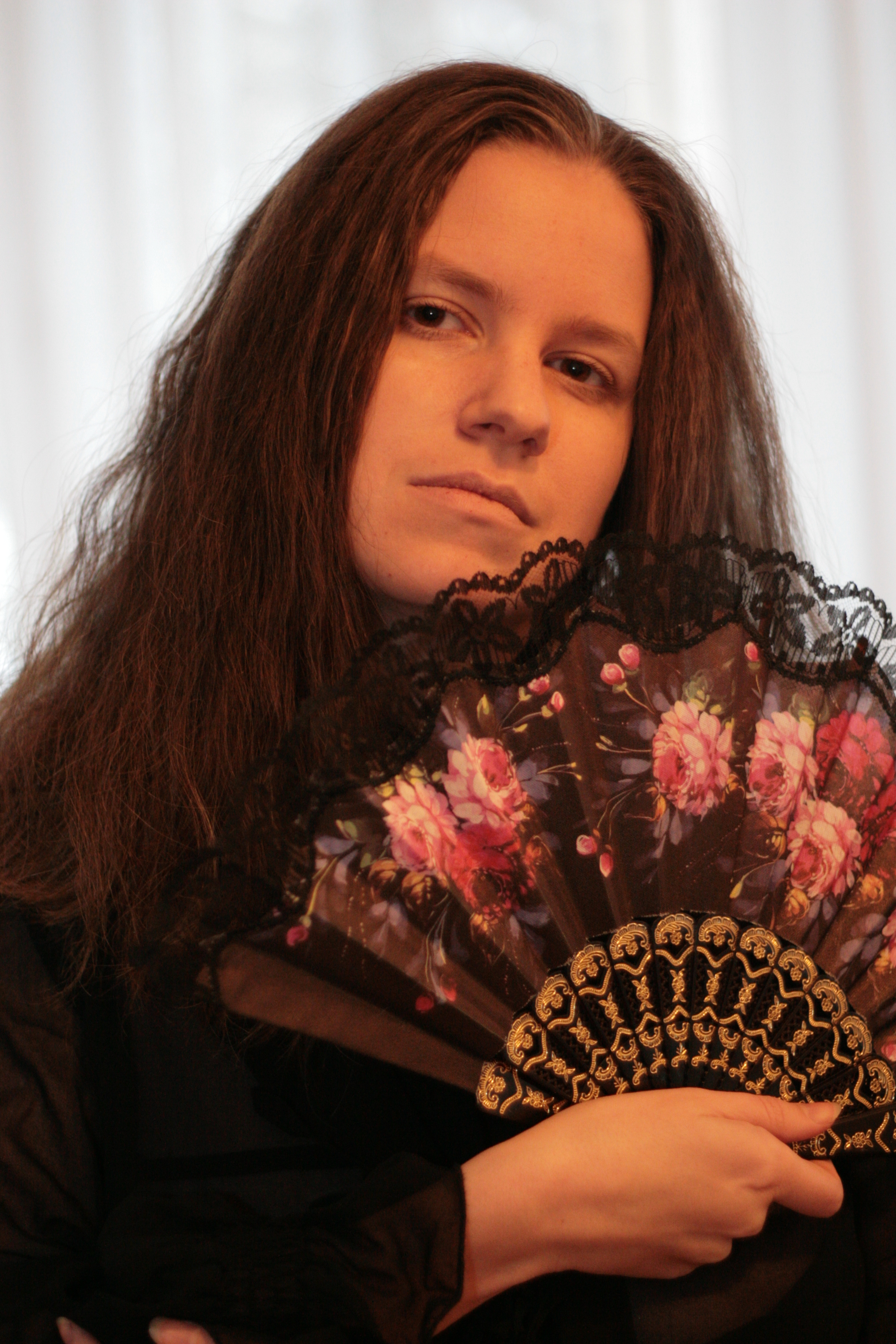
- Born: 1980 (age 45–46); Prague, Czech Republic
- Education: Charles University in Prague
- Occupations: Writer, translator

Lucie Lukačovičová (born 1980 in Prague, Czech Republic) is a Czech fantasy and science fiction writer. She studied cultural anthropology and librarianship at Charles University. She teaches creative writing and works as a free-time pedagogue, organizing activities for children and young adults.

She was the editor of six anthologies of young authors (starting with Stíny věcí – Shadows of Things in 2005) and translator from English (L.K. Hamilton: Guilty Pleasures, The Laughing Corpse, Circus of the Damned; Filipino horror stories An Apartment in Naga by Pancho Alvarez; Filipino poetry Sadness in Rat's Eye by Kristian Sendon Cordero).

She received the Award of Karel Čapek twice, in 2001 and 2007.

She received the 2007 Encouragement Award 2007 from the European Science Fiction Society.

She published nearly one hundred short stories and many articles, novels in collaboration with other authors (Město přízraků – The City of Wraiths; Tajná kniha Šerosvitu – The Secret Book of Chiaroscuro; Cesta Rudé tanečnice – The Voyage of the Red Dancer; Velká bouře v Českých zemích – Great Storm in Czech Lands; Vyjednavač – The Negotiator), and novels of her own (Toki no shujin: Vládci času – Toki no shujin: Masters of Time; Stanice Armida – Station Armida; Detektivní kancelář Sirius – Private Eye Agency Sirius; Poslední bůh – The Last God; Zákon Azylu – Law of the Asylum; Čepel Azylu – Blade of the Asylum; Chrám Azylu – Law of the Asylum).

Her novels were also published as audio-books.

She travels frequently and collects folklore and ghost stories to use in her writing. Her short stories were published in English, German, Polish, Chinese, Bulgarian, Kannada, Portuguese and Italian. She frequently co-writes with her sister, Petra Lukačovičová.
