= The Vampire Council of Anita Blake: Vampire Hunter =

This is an alphabetical listing of members of the Vampire Council and their followers in Laurell K. Hamilton's Anita Blake: Vampire Hunter series of novels.

== Members of the Vampire Council ==
Always 7 plus The Mother

=== Belle Morte ===
Beautiful, pale skinned, dark haired, with eyes the color of dark honey, Belle Morte (or "Beautiful Death") is a Vampire Council member and apparently personally responsible for the rise of "sexy vampires" in the Anitaverse. She is known to be at least 2,000 years old. Her abilities include the power to induce lust from a distance (extending to at least hundreds of people at a distance of miles), the ability to draw power from lust, and the ability to call all of the "great cats" (presumably lions, tigers, leopards, jaguars, etc.). All members of Belle-Morte's bloodline tend to be selected for their beauty, and some of the vampires in her line are visited by the ardeur, becoming incubi or succubi that need to feed off of lust as well as blood, but able to also project the ardeur to control others. Belle-Morte can make mental contact with all new vampires of her bloodline, and can serve as a mental "bridge" between willing members of her bloodline. In some cases, Belle Morte has shown the power to actually "resculpt" the features of vampires in her bloodline, making them still more beautiful than when they were chosen. Jean-Claude, Sabin, and Asher are all of Belle Morte's bloodline. It has been speculated that Belle Morte can use her control over the vampires in her lineage to cause "problem" that always seem to work out to her benefit, as in the case with the Master Vampire of London who seemingly went crazy out of the blue and killed his Kiss of Vampires.

Appearances: Narcissus in Chains, Cerulean Sins, Danse Macabre, The Harlequin, Bullet (all spiritually only).

=== The Dragon ===
This female member of the Vampire Council is somewhat enigmatic. She is an old vampire, having created Primo in ancient Roman times. She has the power to draw all of the energy from another vampire, killing it permanently. Like Belle Morte and Morvoren, the Dragon can project her power, and did so in an attempt to force Anita to feed on Jean-Claude's vampires.

In Blue Moon, Damian states that the Dragon had formerly sired many vampires, but has remained largely secluded during recent centuries. In Incubus Dreams, the Dragon sent Primo to St. Louis in an attempt to dethrone or destabilize Jean-Claude. Once Jean-Claude and Anita overcame Primo, the Dragon permitted Primo to remain as their servant and expressed a desire to discuss "Council business" with them.

Appearances: Blue Moon (mentioned only); Incubus Dreams (spiritually only) Skin Trade (mentioned only).

=== Marmee Noir ===
Generally known as The Sweet Dark or as the Mother Of All Darkness (in Cerulean Sins, Anita dubbed her "Mommie Dearest"), Marmee Noir is the leader of all vampires and the head of the Vampire Council. She is both a vampire and a lycanthrope at once, and is apparently a were-cave lion. According to several of the vampires, she was the first vampire, which means that, like Mr Oliver, she predates the evolution of Homo sapiens. However, it has also been hinted that she is the Mother vampire in a metaphorical, rather than literal sense, having created the rules and culture that governs the vampire race.

It has been suggested that she is a unique type of vampire, distinctly different and more powerful, from all later descendants; perhaps not even a vampire, per se, but a unique type of monster with vampiric traits. Her powers include control over several species of vampire/lycanthrope mixes, the ability to project her attention and mental powers, and a deep control over darkness.

Marmee Noir and her vampire/lycanthrope followers have been "sleeping" for centuries, for unknown reasons, in an underground tower that looks out on a wide open space. They are now beginning to awaken, spurred at least partially by Noir's interest in Anita.

Merlin was turned by Marmee Noir, and appears to have some idea why she went to sleep, but has not revealed his theory to Anita. Anita believes that Belle Morte is gathering her power to challenge Noir for leadership of the Vampire Council, but Belle appears to be naively underestimating Marmee Noir's true nature and powers. Belle Morte claimed she was the reason why some of Mother Dark's followers had woken, but it was later thought by some familiar with Marmee Noir to be merely coincidental.

Possibly dead after a human attack in her resting place during Skin Trade.

In Bullet, it is revealed that she survived the physical destruction of her body, and lives on by 'riding' other vampires the same way the Traveller does. She controlled Belle Morte, Morte d'Amour, and Padma, although the St. Louis triumvirate broke her hold on Belle, who then fled. Belle told them the Traveller was also in hiding, and it wasn't known whether Marmee Noir had control of the Dragon. She is killed by Anita in 'Hit List' by Anita "Drinking" her darkness (energy), a Power she received in Obsidian Butterfly.

Appearances: Cerulean Sins; Danse Macabre; The Harlequin; Blood Noir; Skin Trade, Bullet (all only spiritually, so far)

=== Morte D'Amour ===
A member of the vampire council; although translated in the novels as "lover of death," his name more accurately translates to "death of love" or "death from love." (For example, Aloysius Bertrand's poem "Madam de Montbazon" includes the line "Elle était morte d'amour, rendant son âme dans le parfum d'une jacinthe," which translates to "She had died of love, leaving her soul in the perfume of a hyacinth.")

Morte D'Amour is a rotting vampire, meaning he can appear to decompose even to the point of becoming skeletal, as well as the ability to cause corruption with his bite. All vampires with either ability appear to be of his bloodline. In Blue Moon, Damian states that Morte D'Amour had formerly sired many vampires and was responsible for the ancient tales of vampires being largely corpse-like in appearance. D'Amour gains some of Marmee Noir's power in Bullet and is the antagonist of Affliction, raising an army of zombies and spreading a psychic-affliction that kills slowly to feed off the infected and gaining the ability to "ride" both the zombies and infected like Marmee Noir and the Traveler can vampires.

Appearance: Bullet (spiritually only), Affliction

=== Mr Oliver ===
Also known as "the Earthmover," Mr. Oliver was a member of the Vampire Council and, to his knowledge, the oldest living vampire. Oliver was approximately 4 feet tall, with a sloping brow, absent chin, and expensively cut blow-dried hair. Because it was suggested that Oliver was member of the Homo erectus species, a pre-human vampire, Anita estimated his age at approximately one million years.

A master vampire, Oliver's abilities included the ability to cause earthquakes, the power to "draw blood from a distance," levitation of himself or others, the ability to remain awake during the day and mask his vampire nature almost totally, voice powers similar to Jean-Claude's, and the ability to call snakes and snake-like supernatural creatures. His retinue included Alejandro, Melanie the Lamia, and his human servant Karl Inger.

An opponent of the liberalization of vampire laws, Oliver planned to kill Jean-Claude, become master of St. Louis, then force all vampires in the city to engage in a killing spree to create a political climate hostile to vampire legalization. Oliver defeated Jean-Claude, but Anita killed him before he could sacrifice Jean-Claude and begin his plan. She defeated Alejandro and Oliver by ripping out their hearts and throats.

Currently, no vampire has been named as taking Mr. Oliver's place on the Vampire Council.

Appearances: Circus of the Damned.

=== Padma ===
Padma, also known as the Master of Beasts, is originally Indian and wears a turban. He is one of the weaker members of the Vampire Council as he can only gain strength from his human servant through direct feeding. His unique power is the ability to "call" all animals, not just a single species. Using this power, Padma can bend animals and shapeshifters to his will, and can also use the power as if it were a shapeshifter's "beast" - forcing his power into another, controlling their shapeshifting, and even killing them. He is a member of the only other surviving triumvirate in the novels, with Gideon and Captain Thomas Carswell. Anita successfully demanded that Padma surrender his son, Fernando in return for Anita sparing Padma's life. Anita then gave Fernado to Sylvie, a woman he had raped in an attempt to capture the werewolves, to do as she wished. Sylvie killed Fernando and now keeps his bones in a box in her room.

Appearances: Burnt Offerings, Bullet (spiritually only)

=== The Traveler ===
It is unknown what the Traveler's true name is. He has the ability to possess other vampire's bodies, though that vampire's consciousness is still awake. This seems to be limited only to vampires considerably weaker than himself; Jean-Claude was once the victim of this ability. He also has the ability to lend power to lesser vampires temporarily, bolstering their inherent strengths, and he can shield others from sensing him. The Traveler's own body was not present on his visit to St. Louis, only his consciousness possessing other vampires, and it was suggested that the Traveler's body is hidden away someplace.

The Traveler was the only member of the council who is revealed to have known Oliver's plans to take over St. Louis and then use the vampires to make them illegal in the states there. He did nothing, stating that council members do not fight other council members. He also does not like Padma.

He is a strictly homosexual vampire, whose human servant, Balthasar, is also his lover. A large part of their relationship appears to revolve around the enjoyment they each derive from The Traveler possessing new bodies for use in their sexual antics.

Appearances: Burnt Offerings

== Followers ==
=== Alejandro ===
An Aztec master vampire more than one thousand years old, Alejandro was one of Mr. Oliver's retinue, who plotted to destroy Oliver and gain his freedom. Alejandro was largely immune to silver and had the ability to turn humans into vampires with a single bite. He was also able to reflect a flamethrower attack, causing the stream of flames to reverse in midair. Alejandro led a pack of four other vampires, most or all of whom were killed by Edward. Alejandro made Anita into his human servant against her will, overwhelming the marks that Jean-Claude had previously placed on her. Anita ultimately killed Alejandro, barely surviving the experience herself.

Appearances: Circus of the Damned.

=== Musette ===
One of Belle Morte's lieutenants, Musette has a preference for "young blood" (i.e. from minors), which is illegal in the United States. Her human servant is named Angelito, meaning "little angel", which is ironic considering he is anything but little. Musette has tortured and scared vampires that Belle Morte gave her for hundreds of years. Jason describes her, in the first book she appears in, as a "blonde Barbie doll," however there is something about her that invokes fear. Anita adds that Musette is a few inches shorter than her, with blue eyes and black eyebrows.

Appearances: Cerulean Sins

=== Warrick ===
One of Morte D'Amour's followers, Warrick was made into a vampire in the 13th century by Yvette, when he was a member of the Crusades. Warrick had the rare ability to control and create fire (pyrokinesis), and believed it to be a gift from God, this as well as his ability to become a master vampire were suppressed while he served in the presence of the Vampire Council. Upon arriving in the United States he was a sufficient distance from the Councils debilitating influence reaching the status of master vampire while in St. Louis, he also gained the almost unheard-of ability to walk in sunlight[which he claimed/believed came from God] and an animal to call, which was revealed to be the butterfly. He burned himself to death when he killed Yvette

Appearances: Burnt Offerings

=== Yvette ===
One of Morte D'Amour's followers, Yvette was a sadist who enjoyed rotting on people. She tortured Warrick for many years; however, upon their arrival to the United States, Warrick's powers slowly grew to their full potential, and Warrick burned Yvette to death.

Appearances: Burnt Offerings
