= Vilma Kadlečková =

Czech science fiction and fantasy writer

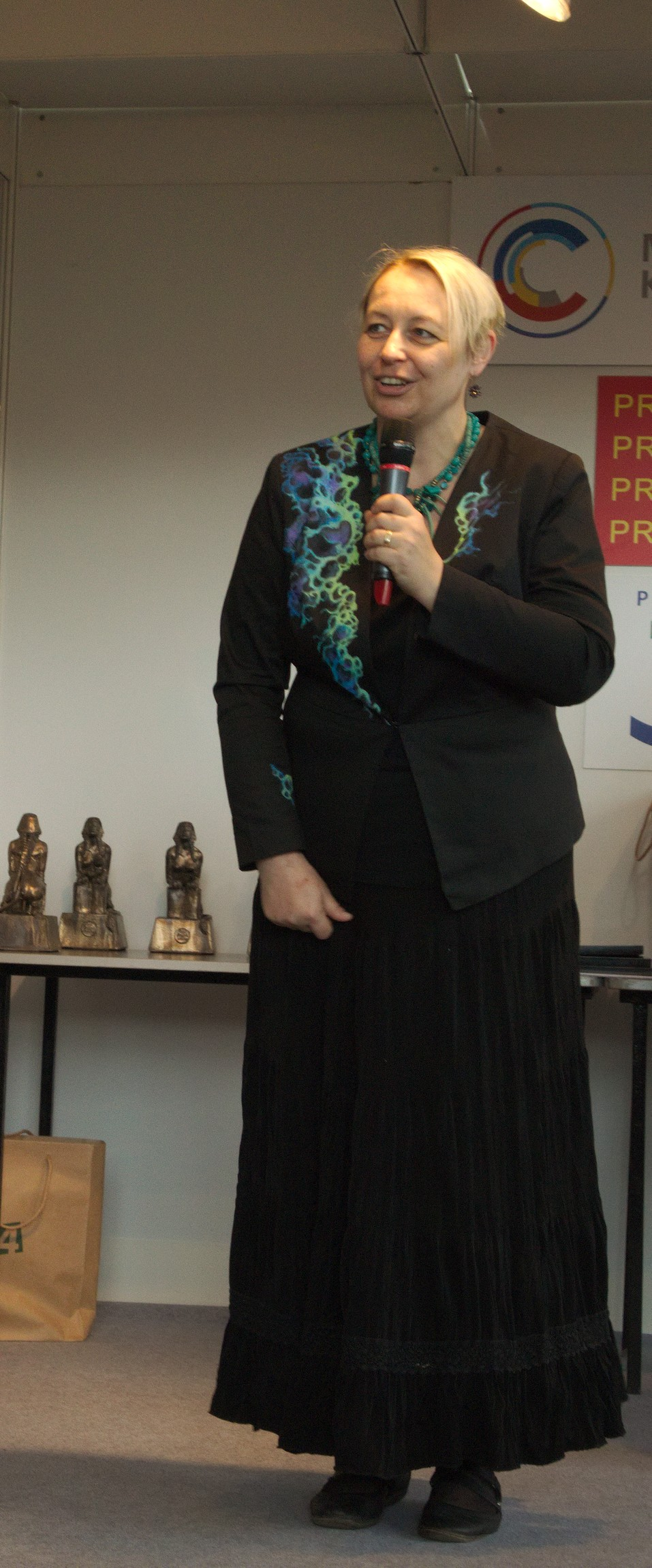
Vilma Kadlečková in 2015

Vilma Kadlečková (born May 27, 1971, Prague) is a Czech science-fiction and fantasy writer.

== Bibliography ==
- Na pomezí Eternaalu (Winston Smith, Prague 1990) – a sci-fi novel from the cycle 'Legends about argenite'
- Jednou bude tma (Laser, Plzeň 1991) – a collection of short sci-fi stories
- Meče Lorgan (Návrat, Brno 1993) – a sci-fi novel from the cycle 'Legends about argenite'
- Stavitelé věží (Altar, Prague 1994) – a novel from the cycle 'Legends about argenite'
- Pán všech krůpějí (Netopejr, Olomouc 2000) – fantasy novel
- O snovačce a přemyslovi (In: Imperium Bohemorum, Albatros, Prague 2007) - fantasy novel
- Lunapark Luna (In: Hvězdy české sci–fi, Argo, Prague 2010) - a novel from the cycle 'Legends about argenite'
- Na pomezí Eternaalu (Albatros Plus, Prague 2010) – second edition of the novel, with added short stories from the cycle 'Legends about argenite'
- Tajná kniha Šerosvitu (Albatros, Prague 2011) – fantasy for children, a joint project of five female writers (with Karolina Francová, Sanča Fülle, Vilma Kadlečková, Lucie Lukačovičová, Julie Nováková)
- Starýma očima, za tisíc let (In: Krvavá čest, Triton, Prague 2012)
- Mycelium I: Jantarové oči (Argo, Prague 2013)
- Mycelium II: Led pod kůží (Argo, Prague 2013)
- Mycelium III: Pád do temnot (Argo, Prague 2014)
- Mycelium IV: Vidění (Argo, Prague 2014)
- Mycelium V: Hlasy a hvězdy (Argo, Prague 2016)
- Mycelium VI: Vrstva ticha (Argo, Prague 2021)
- Mycelium VII: Zakázané směry (Argo, Prague 2022)
- Mycelium VIII: Program apokalypsy (Argo, Prague 2022)

== Awards ==
- Na pomezí Eternaalu - awarded with "Mlok" 1990 in prize "O Cenu Karla Čapka"
- Stavitelé věží - awarded with "Mlok" 1993 in prize O Cenu Karla Čapka
- O snovačce a přemyslovi - prize of "Akademie SFFH" 2007 (Czech) in the short story category
- Lunapark Luna - prize of "Akademie SFFH" 2007 (Czech) in the short story category
- Starýma očima, za tisíc let - readers prize Aeronautilus (Czech) for year 2012 in short story category
- Mycelium I: Jantarové oči - prize of "Akademie SFFH" 2013 (Czech) for book of the year and original Czech/Slovak book
- Mycelium III: Pád do temnot - prize of "Akademie SFFH" 2014 (Czech) for book of the year and original Czech/Slovak book
