= The Laughing Corpse =

1994 novel by Laurell K. Hamilton

- First US edition
- Author: Laurell K. Hamilton
- Cover artist: Steve Gardner
- Language: English
- Series: Anita Blake: Vampire Hunter
- Genre: Mystery, horror
- Publisher: Ace Books
- Publication date: 1 September 1994
- Publication place: United States
- Media type: Print
- Pages: 293 (Ace edition)
- ISBN: 0-441-00091-6 (Ace edition)
- OCLC: 30961442
- Preceded by: Guilty Pleasures
- Followed by: Circus of the Damned

The Laughing Corpse is a horror and mystery novel by American writer Laurell K. Hamilton, the second book in her Anita Blake: Vampire Hunter series. It continues the adventures of Anita Blake, as she attempts to solve a particularly grisly set of murders, while simultaneously avoiding two potential threats to her life from people interested in using her talents as a zombie animator. Meanwhile, Anita continues to attempt to come to grips with her powers and her relationship with Jean-Claude, the vampire master of St. Louis and Anita's would be lover/master.

A comic book adaptation of The Laughing Corpse was released in 2008, with the first volume of the collected issues achieving the New York Times Bestseller List for graphic books.

== Plot ==
The Laughing Corpse takes place a month after the events of Guilty Pleasures and begins with Anita and her manager Bert visiting Harold Gaynor, a local millionaire that wants Anita to animate a 300-year-old corpse. He informs Anita that he'd be willing to pay millions of dollars for her to do this, even supplying a willing "white goat" that would be needed for an animation of that level. Anita immediately refuses the offer, with Bert agreeing not to take on the case after discovering that the "white goat" was a euphemism for a human sacrifice.

Anita is later called in to a murder scene by Dolph, the head of the area's supernatural crimes unit. A family was discovered to be torn apart, with a child missing and possibly still alive. Anita theorizes that it would likely be a flesh-eating zombie as there was too much blood left at the scene and that only two people could raise and control a zombie of that power: herself and vaudun priestess Senora Dominga Salvador. The only other person capable of this feat, Peter Burke, recently died.

Anita sets up a meeting with Salvador through her mentor Manny Rodriguez, where she discovers that Salvador is both very evil and very powerful. Salvador demonstrates her technique for capturing the souls of the dead and installing them in zombies, preventing the zombies from decaying and allowing further punishment of the dead. She invites Anita to become her partner and help create ensouled zombies for profit, to which Anita refuses and is chased out of the house by an unseen creature.

At the funeral for Peter Burke, Anita meets the deceased's brother John Burke, who is also a powerful vaudun priest and capable of committing the zombie murders. Later that day Anita also meets up with Irving Griswold, who supplies her with information on Gaynor, including the name of one of Gaynor's former lovers, Wheelchair Wanda. Irving then tries to get Anita to reveal who the current Master of the City is, only for Irving to discover that it is Jean-Claude after he appears in an attempt to persuade Anita to accept her position as his human servant.

That evening Anita investigates a cemetery where remains of one of the murdered family members was discovered and through her powers discovers that a grave has been recently disturbed, with another being empty. The tombstone for the empty grave has been smashed, with Anita finding a charm bracelet. Anita takes some pieces of the tombstone and the bracelet to an associate that is a touch clairvoyant, who reluctantly tells her that the charm bracelet belonged to a woman sacrificed to raise a zombie. Anita is later attacked several times, once by zombies in her apartment and again later by thugs who attempt to kidnap her and her friend Ronnie. The two manage to foil the kidnapping attempt and discover that the thugs were working for Gaynor. Anita eventually visits the town's red light district with Jean-Claude, who helps her intimidate Wheelchair Wanda into talking about Gaynor and divulging that he is obsessed with the idea of finding a historic family treasure and getting revenge.

Anita is called to another crime scene so recent that she believes that the zombie might be still hiding in the neighborhood. Dolph begins a search of the neighborhood as well as authorizing Anita to show John his brother's possessions in an attempt to discover any involvement in the murders. Through this she discovers that Peter possessed a gris-gris that contained a portion of the power of a powerful vaudun practitioner that would increase the power of any animator who possessed it. With John, Anita and the police confront Salvador with the gris-gris, which is revealed to be hers. Her grandson Antonio then confesses that he was supposed to remove the charm after Peter's death and now fears what punishment he might receive for this failure. The police discover a video of the events relating to the charm, and with the confession they then arrest Salvador. Anita then returns to the latest crime scene, where she is attacked by the zombie and lays it to rest.

Upon returning home Anita is kidnapped by Gaynor's bodyguards and taken to his home, where Anita finds that Salvador has used her influence to gain bail. Gaynor informs Anita that he and Salvador are going to force Anita to raise a relative of Gaynors using his ex-lover Wheelchair Wanda, who has also been kidnapped. Anita refuses, which prompts Salvador to go to another room to begin a spell that would compel Anita to obey her. Anita manages to kill the bodyguards holding them captive and tries to escape with Wanda, only for the compulsion spell to force her to return to the cemetery near Gaynor's home. At the cemetery Salvador informs Anita that she gave Peter a gris-gris to raise his power enough to raise Gaynor's ancestor, as she was unwilling to perform a human sacrifice in front of witnesses. However, because Gaynor's ancestor was an animator, he rose as an uncontrollable flesh-eating zombie and Burke was murdered to keep the animation a secret.

Salvador orders Anita to "perform human sacrifice", but due to a loophole in the spell Anita only has to perform the command literally and kills the guards holding Wanda. The resulting power from their sacrifice allows Anita to raise and control every corpse in the cemetery and she commands them to kill both Salvador and Gaynor. Anita then lays the zombies to rest. In the epilogue Anita explains that the "disappearances" of Salvador and Gaynor have never been solved, that she continues to refuse Jean-Claude, and that she is now considering the extent and implications of the power she now realizes she has.

== Characters ==
- Anita Blake
- Dominga Salvador
- Jean-Claude
- Edward
- Harold Gaynor

== Reception ==
Reception for the first volume of The Laughing Corpse graphic novel was positive, with Marianne de Pierres's blog stating that the "graphic novels maintain a good balance between dialogue and illustrations and the story keeps up an intense pace".
