= Micah (novel) =

2006 novel by Laurell K. Hamilton

- 2006 edition cover
- Author: Laurell K. Hamilton
- Cover artist: Cover design by Judith Myrello, cover art by Craig White
- Language: English
- Series: Anita Blake: Vampire Hunter
- Genre: Horror, mystery, erotic
- Publisher: Jove Books (Jove edition)
- Publication date: 2006 (Jove edition)
- Publication place: United States
- Media type: Print
- Pages: 288 (Berkley edition)
- ISBN: 0-515-14087-2 (Berkley edition)
- OCLC: 64021233
- LC Class: CPB Box no. 2450 vol. 12
- Preceded by: Incubus Dreams
- Followed by: Danse Macabre

Micah is a horror/mystery/erotica novel by American writer Laurell K. Hamilton, the thirteenth book in the Anita Blake: Vampire Hunter series.

== Plot ==
Micah apparently takes place approximately one month after the events of Incubus Dreams. Tammy Reynolds, one of the characters in the series, is four months pregnant in Incubus Dreams and five months pregnant in Micah). As usual, Anita must juggle several problems simultaneously.

First, in her role as an animator, Anita must travel to Philadelphia on short notice to substitute for Larry Kirkland, who must remain in St. Louis because of complications in his wife Tammy's pregnancy. Although the assignment—reanimating a recently deceased federal witness in order to testify in an organized crime investigation—initially seems routine, Anita quickly begins to suspect that there is more to the case than she and Larry have been told.

Second, Anita continues to deal with her various personal problems, in this case her relationship with Micah, who accompanies her on the trip. Anita must come to terms with Micah's decision to reserve a nice hotel room for the two of them without telling her, and must help Micah get over two of the defining problems in his life: first, the trauma narrowly surviving a wereleopard attack that left several members of his family dead; and second, the trauma of accidentally harming a previous girlfriend during sex, due to his unusually large penis.

Third, Anita continues wrestle with her recent increase in power, first attempting to deal with the ardeur, a metaphysical effect that causes Anita to need to have sex every few hours, and second, wrestling with the vast increase in her own powers as a necromancer, which are now so powerful that her attempt to raise a single person threatens to raise every corpse in the cemetery. As usual, Anita is able largely to resolve each of these problems by the end of the novella.

The initial plot point—the animation—is not resolved until the very end of the novella. Although Anita initially wrestles with her increase in power, she is ultimately able to confine her power to a single corpse, raising only the witness, Emmett Leroy Rose. However, Anita then learns that although Rose technically died of a heart attack, the heart attack itself occurred after the defense lawyer in the investigation, Arthur Salvia, framed Rose for murder. Rose therefore considers Salvia his murderer and will not rest until he has killed Salvia. In the ensuing fracas, Anita is knocked unconscious, and Salvia is killed.

With regard to Anita's personal problems, she and Micah make some progress. Anita decides to accept that Micah surprised her with the romantic hotel, and listens to him share the traumas of almost being eaten alive by a wereleopard and of being rejected by various women. Anita sympathizes with Micah's survivor's guilt, and, in a conversation very similar to her conversation with Richard in Incubus Dreams, explains to Micah that some women do not like well-endowed men, but other women, such as Anita, do.

== Characters ==
=== Major characters ===
Incubus Dreams features the following major characters.

- Anita Blake:
- Micah: Micah reveals some of his past and shows an emotion that is not so easy-going. Anita actually hurt his feelings when she didn't like the hotel room, which he arranged for once he realized that it was only going to be the two of them, this one time. Micah has also never seen nor helped Anita's animator part before, so the zombie raising was a new experience. He also points out that it is hard to be a man in Anita's life because she's so aggressive and it was nice to see her be weak or coward-like on the airplane.
- Nathaniel: Nathaniel appears only in the beginning and end of the novella, and is his typical supportive self. The only major character development for Nathaniel is when he and Micah reveal that they believe that Asher has a crush on Nathaniel.

=== Other characters ===
Recurring characters include:

- Larry Kirkland: Larry appears in the beginning and in the end, to put the zombie to rest. Apparently Tammy's baby is fine, the labor was stopped.
- Agent Franklin: Someone that Anita worked in New Mexico with Bradley Bradford, who doesn't like Anita very much and has apparently been reassigned. When Anita is in the graveyard however, Agent Franklin appears to be a bit sensitive to the magic or spirits involved which might explain the dislike.

Non-recurring characters include:

- Special Agent Chester Fox: Who met Micah after he was attacked by a wereleopard that had killed his cousin, and his uncle, while nearly killing him. Agent Fox told Micah that he owes him twice now, once for not having the guts to demand that there be a warning for the hunters about the rampaging wereleopard/killer in the area, and twice for not looking deeper into the Rose case, potentially allowing Anita to be hurt as she was.

The death toll in Micah includes: Arthur Salvia and a salesman die in this novel's timeline. Other deaths are mentioned that happened in the past, however. The zombie took care of Salvia, after Salvia tried to hire someone to take care of the animator who would raise the zombie.

== Critical reception ==
A March 26, 2006 review in the Boston Globe was largely negative, writing "To be fair, this may not have been the best place to jump into a series, but we were not impressed. Hamilton no doubt appeals to romance and erotica lovers, but it does not take long for the clichés and the constant droning about sex to become tiresome."
