= The Harlequin (novel) =

2007 novel by Laurell K. Hamilton

- Author: Laurell K. Hamilton
- Cover artist: Craig White
- Language: English
- Series: Anita Blake: Vampire Hunter
- Genre: Horror, Mystery, Erotic novel
- Publisher: Berkley Hardcover
- Publication date: June 5, 2007
- Publication place: United States
- Media type: Print
- Pages: 496 p.
- ISBN: 0-425-21724-8
- OCLC: 84152890
- LC Class: PS3558.A443357 H37 2007
- Preceded by: Danse Macabre
- Followed by: Blood Noir

The Harlequin is the fifteenth book in the Anita Blake: Vampire Hunter series of horror/mystery/erotica novels by Laurell K. Hamilton; it was released June 5, 2007.

== Plot ==
The events of The Harlequin take place one week after the events of Danse Macabre. The Harlequin shows Anita and Jean Claude coping with a threat from Vampire Council enforcers. Desperate, Anita calls Edward for assistance. Edward arrives the same day, bringing Olaf and Peter, who we last saw in Obsidian Butterfly.

The Harlequin exists to police and punish vampire leaders who violate various rules, such as Malcolm's resistance to the blood oath. It was formed by the Mother of All Darkness, modeled in style on the Commedia dell'arte and by action on the wild hunt. It is composed of very old and powerful vampires who are capable of not just manipulating the behaviors and emotions of humans or younger vampires and lycanthropes, but of Jean-Claude, Anita, and Richard. Under this influence, Richard and Jean-Claude nearly kill each other, and Anita must also be repeatedly resuscitated.

Anita keeps them alive by feeding on first Rafael and through him, all the wererats in the city, Belle Morte and later, all the swanmanes in the United States via the swan king, Donovan Reece. Anita's second triumvirate also comes through, with Nathaniel and Damien "eating for five" so as to provide healing energy to Anita — and the others through her.

However, the Harlequin appears not to be following its own rules, so by vampire law Jean Claude's people can strike back. Edward doesn't actually kill a Harlequin, Anita does through a psychic link that she accidentally creates while trying to remove a sort of vampire spell that one of the Harlequin has put on her in order to keep track of her and Jean Claude's movements.

They subsequently end up killing the human servant of that vampire after Anita has fed on Donovan the king of the swan manes. They recover in time to face off with the remaining members in Malcolm's Church of Eternal Life. They not only succeed, but determine that the Harlequin members were planning to take over Jean-Claude's territory and not operating on official Council orders.

Anita's rage, a simmering cauldron of hurt and betrayal, threatened to boil over. An emerging malevolent entity, the "Mother of Darkness," fed on that anger, causing cracks in Anita's resolve. Every one of Anita's bitter thoughts fueled the darkness as the Mother grew stronger. Each flicker of resentment was a chilling promise of the Mother's imminent and arrival in the world. Blinded by her own fury, Anita soon found herself about to unleash a nightmare, a monstrous being born out of her own pain. The air crackled with anticipation, a terrifying silence before the storm, as Anita teetered on the edge of a terrible, irreversible choice.

Anita also leaves her former allies, the werelions, to potential death. At a point where Anita and many of her other allies are injured, sex is demanded from the werelion Rex Joseph so that Anita could gain the power to heal. The rex refuses because he is married and values being faithful to his wife. In a scene reminiscent of The Godfather series, Anita decides that this is a betrayal of their alliance and decides to abandon Joseph.

== Characters ==
=== Major characters ===
The Harlequin features the following major characters.

- Anita Blake
- Jean-Claude
- Richard
- Asher
- Micah
- Damian
- Nathaniel
- Requiem

=== Other characters ===
Recurring characters include:

- Malcolm
- Olaf
- Peter
- Edward
- Remus
- Belle Morte

Non-recurring characters include:

- Mercia
- Soledad
