= Guilty Pleasures (novel) =

1993 novel by Laurell K. Hamilton

- Author: Laurell K. Hamilton
- Cover artist: Steve Gardner (Ace edition)
- Language: English
- Series: Anita Blake: Vampire Hunter
- Genre: Horror, Mystery, Urban fantasy
- Publisher: Ace Books (US); New English Library (UK)
- Publication date: 1993 (Ace edition)
- Publication place: United States
- Media type: Print
- Pages: 266 (Ace edition)
- ISBN: 0-441-30483-4 (Ace edition)
- OCLC: 28834618
- Followed by: The Laughing Corpse

Guilty Pleasures is a horror and mystery novel by American writer Laurell K. Hamilton. It is the first book in the Anita Blake: Vampire Hunter series. Guilty Pleasures introduces the character of Anita Blake, a vampire hunter and necromancer, who works in an alternate universe where magic, vampires, werewolves and other supernatural elements exist. The novel blends elements of supernatural and hardboiled detective fiction.

== Plot ==
As an animator and licensed vampire hunter, Anita Blake raises zombies for a living. She also consults with RPIT on supernatural crimes and works as a vampire executioner. Anita is a highly skilled vampire hunter known as "The Executioner," feared by vampires. Anita Blake, a vampire hunter, is suspicious when a vampire named Willie McCoy hires her to investigate a series of vampire murders. She declines the offer, but Willie insists it's not a final decision.

Anita attends her friend Catherine's bachelorette party at a vampire-run strip club and realizes how determined the vampires truly are. Anita is interrupted while watching a stripper named Phillip perform to consult on a new police case. Catherine is captivated by Aubrey, a vampire performer, at a club. Anita agrees to meet Nikolaos, the master vampire of St. Louis, to safeguard Catherine. Jean-Claude saves Anita from Aubrey's attack by creating a metaphysical "mark" that links them and allows him to share his power with her.

While unconscious, Anita is transported to the master vampire's lair hidden under the Circus of the Damned. Nikolaos uses wererats to try and scare Anita. Rafael, the Rat King, stops Nikolaos's plan from succeeding. Anita has a meeting with Nikolaos and Zachary, who is also an animator. Nikolaos hired Zachary to resurrect a murder witness as a zombie. Nikolaos, angered by Rafael's actions, attempts to use her supernatural abilities to coerce Anita into complying with her wishes. Nikolaos realizes Jean-Claude has marked Anita after she survives his attack.

Anita is in a life-or-death situation and recognizes Zachary, but can't place him due to the urgency of her circumstances. Zachary interrogates a zombie about murders, but his violent approach destroys the zombie's mind. Nikolaos becomes enraged when the interrogation is unsuccessful. Jean-Claude defends Anita, a fight ensues, and Jean-Claude is imprisoned and denied blood. While trying to escape, Anita is forcibly marked by Jean-Claude, who is desperate to save himself.

Anita arrives home and discovers Edward, a hit man who targets vampires and werewolves, is in her apartment. A person is demanding the location of Nikolaos's daytime lair and offering to help Anita kill vampires in exchange for the information. Anita negotiates for more time, and Edward departs, assuring her he will return with additional weapons. Anita is being held captive and fears the return of someone who will torture her if she doesn't give up a location.

Anita is trapped and searching for answers while being hunted by monsters. During the investigation, she must contend with strange food cravings and dreams as Jean-Claude leeches her energy to survive. Nikolaos tasks Phillip, a stripper, with assisting Anita and keeping him updated on her progress.

Anita follows leads and infiltrates a party for vampire junkies, including Phillip, by going undercover. A woman discovers Zachary attempting to raise a zombie for Nikolaos and a group of vampires. Anita and Zachary raise a zombie, and Anita discovers a magical charm on its arm. Zachary is scared when someone tries to touch him with a bloody hand. Anita realizes she unknowingly attended Zachary's funeral, and the charm she possesses is the key to his continued existence. Anita and Phillip's party return is cut short when religious zealots disrupt the event, forcing them to escape.

The raid on the party makes Anita suspects The Church of Eternal Life, a vampire church promising immortality, is connected to the recent murders. Anita questions Malcolm, the leader of the vampire church, hired Edward to kill the recently murdered vampires. Anita faces a moral dilemma: sacrifice someone else to a monster named Nikolaos or save herself.

Anita learns Phillip has been kidnapped and is being tortured by vampires. A rescue attempt fails, and Phillip is killed by Nikolaos. Anita retaliates against her torturers by stabbing one of the vampires involved. Nikolaos punishes Anita's disobedience with a bite. Nikolaos abandoned the unconscious Anita at Guilty Pleasures.

Anita wakes up, goes home, and finds Edward there demanding the location of Nikolaos' daytime hiding spot. Anita agrees to tell him in exchange for his help cleansing her wounds and killing Nikolaos. Anita is seeking Rafael's help to secretly get into the Circus.

Before her meeting with Rafael, Anita is tasked by her boss to help a high-profile client lay a zombie to rest. She and Edward go to the cemetery, but the client doesn't show up. Zachary and a group of ghouls unexpectedly appear and confront someone. Zachary admits he murders vampires to power his charm's magic. Anita and Edward were ordered to be eaten by ghouls, but they escaped. They then got help from wererats.

The wererats guided Anita and Edward to a hidden entrance under the Circus. Anita and Edward infiltrate a location and kill three vampires: two with silver nitrate injections and one with a shotgun. Nikolaos and her servant are drawn to the noise. Zachary is present and responsible for turning Phillip into a zombie. Anita refuses to fight her human servant when forced by Nikolaos, and in doing so reveals she knows who the murderer is. Zachary attempts to murder Anita once more, but Nikolaos intervenes and injures him.

Anita and Edward kill Nikolaos and her servant, break Zachary's control, and free Jean-Claude, who then becomes the new Master of the City. Anita used magic to help Phillip die peacefully. The novel ends with Edward and Anita receiving medical care from a were-rat doctor, and Jean-Claude extending an invitation for a date to Anita.

== Characters ==
- Anita Blake
- Nikolaos
- Jean-Claude
- Edward
- Phillip

== Adaptations ==
On October 20, 2006 a twelve issue comic book adaptation of Guilty Pleasures began, published by Marvel Comics and Dabel Brothers Productions. The set was collected into two volumes starting in 2007, with a complete edition releasing in 2009.

== Reception ==
The Celebrity Cafe gave the book a positive review, calling it "engaging".
