= Blood Noir =

2008 novel by Laurell K. Hamilton

- First US edition
- Author: Laurell K. Hamilton
- Cover artist: Judith Murello
- Language: English
- Series: Anita Blake: Vampire Hunter
- Genre: Horror, Mystery, Erotic novel
- Publisher: Berkley Books (Berkley edition)
- Publication date: May 27, 2008 (Berkley edition)
- Publication place: United States
- Media type: Print
- Pages: 340 p. (Berkley edition)
- ISBN: 978-0-425-22219-5 (Berkley edition)
- OCLC: 180754785
- Dewey Decimal: 813/.54 22
- LC Class: PS3558.A443357 B57 2008
- Preceded by: The Harlequin
- Followed by: Skin Trade

Blood Noir is the sixteenth book in the Anita Blake: Vampire Hunter series of horror/mystery/erotica novels by Laurell K. Hamilton.

== Plot summary ==
=== Summary ===
Blood Noir appears to take place a short time after The Harlequin; however it is not noted exactly how much time has elapsed. There are a few main themes in the novel, which are mostly resolved by the end. In Jason's hometown, one of his ancestors had more than his fair share of offspring. Hence, Jason's features are repeated in various cousins and other relatives. During high school Jason was always confused with two of his cousins who happen to be twins. Keith Summerland used the confusion to his benefit a few times, tricking people to believe he was Jason or letting Jason get the beating for Keith's deeds.

As soon as Jean-Claude's private jet lands in North Carolina, Jason is confused for Keith. The local and national media is interested in Keith Summerland because he is getting married and his father, who is currently a governor, is thinking of running for the Presidency. Meanwhile, Jason's father has been given only weeks to live, so time is of the essence. In addition, Jason has rented a hotel room in the same location that Keith is supposed to stay in and where the bridal party is taking place. Keith Summerland is in trouble again, he's fallen for a vampire and would rather marry her than the girl his father wants to marry him to. However, the vampire is already married and her husband does not take kindly to Keith trying to take his bride.

In The Harlequin, Anita was given a charm that is supposed to keep Marmee Noir away. When Anita meets a tiger that calls to one of the tigers inside her, the charm fails or perhaps the Mother of Darkness overpowers it. Previous books have had Anita give her beast to someone else since she cannot shift with a fair amount of success, however Jason would only be able to help Anita if her inner wolf was giving her trouble. Marmee Noir uses Anita to send out a call to every unattached tiger in the nation.

Specifically, two tigers in the area come to Anita, and Jason, instantly and are essentially raped by her for two days. One is Crispin from Las Vegas who broaches the rape issue, a stripper and the other is Alexander Pinn, who is a closeted reporter. Crispin is from a white tiger clan, while Alex is from a red tiger clan. Once again, Anita could be pregnant. Jason tells the possible-daddies-to-be tigers that the would-be baby is probably his and they then allow her to get a morning-after pill. Otherwise, either tiger would have happily married and taken Anita back to his clan. Crispin appears to have been rolled by Anita and is rather heartbroken when she sends him away, while Alex had a harder time fighting Anita's call.

Marmee Noir may be thousands of miles physically from Anita, but she can still reach out and touch the necromancer. When Anita loses consciousness, Marmee Noir wakes her and slashes her shirt open despite being so far away. However, she does not reveal why she is so interested in Anita. It could be that she wants Anita for her own human servant, as other Masters of the City may as well. When the link between Anita and Jean-Claude is broken, they believe that Anita may have been marked by Marmee Noir, but once Anita reclaims her anger from Richard the link is back. Marmee Noir cannot understand Anita's rage because it belongs to Anita and was not passed down from her to any of Marmee Noir's vampire descendants.

The last theme is the desire to be "normal", which most of the main characters admit to wanting. Normal as in what society says most humans want: find a true love, meet the family, get married, have kids, live happily ever after. Unfortunately for Anita, her life is anything but normal, but she's the only one who appears to accept that. When Jason takes Anita home to meet his family, Jean-Claude and Micah both express the desire to do that as well.

Jean-Claude is jealous because while he would want Anita to meet his family, they have all died so long ago that no one knows him from when he was human is left. Anita tells him that she has in a sense met his mother, she's in some sense met Belle Morte and he replies that she is not his people. Belle Morte may be the head of Jean-Claude's bloodline but she is not the matriarch of his family.

Micah broke his ties with his family to keep them safe. When Chimera was alive, he would use family against the members of his pard. With Chimera dead, Micah expresses the desire to introduce Anita to his family. However, Nathaniel is also a part of Anita's and Micah's life which leaves Micah uncertain if all three of them should visit. Nathaniel's role in their life is not so clear and simple nor normal as the roles of boyfriend or girlfriend.

Richard also wants his life to be normal, he wants Anita to be his wife and to live essentially behind a white picket fence. They have quarreled about this many times in many books. When he finds Anita has gained two more lovers to her list or bed post, Richard is distressed. Once Anita takes away her rage from him, he gains a new talent. The talent is the ardor and unfortunately, there is a learning curve to it and at first he tries to use it against her until Jason calls him on it and then Richard simply leaves Anita alone.

Jason's desire to be normal shows in trying to appease his father one last time. To try to convince him that Anita is his girlfriend is the least he can do, while he still has time left to say goodbye to his father. A media frenzy of poor timing and rumors will not stop him in visiting his abusive father in the hopes for that one perfect moment of acceptance that he never had when he was growing up. Jason had no desire for athletics and his choice of theater was not what his father wanted for him. In fact, nearly everything Jason has tried to do to please his father has failed. It is not until the end of the book, when Jason is nearly taken away from his family that Franklin Schuyler realizes exactly how much Jason means to him.

== Characters ==
=== Major characters ===
Blood Noir features the following major characters.

- Anita Blake
- Jason Schuyler
- Jean-Claude
- Richard: When Anita loses her tie to Jean-Claude, Richard comes to North Carolina to try to help. Unfortunately, after seeing that Anita has added to her list of lovers, Richard is not pleased. He releases the anger that he gained from her when Jean-Claude connected them in the triumvirate and Anita realizes she can either fight it or embrace it. By the end of the book, Richard is acting and feeling more like he did when he first met Anita. However, by potentially taking away the anger, Anita may have given him something else in return.
- Micah: Micah is away from St. Louis, checking out a new leopard who wants to join his and Anita's pard. Anita calls him to tell him about going with Jason to North Carolina. Micah expresses that he too, would like to bring Anita to his estranged family as well, someday.
- Nathaniel: Nathaniel plays a role in the beginning of the book only, for he is the one who offered Anita to Jason for moral support.

=== Other characters ===
Recurring characters include:

- Jamil and Shang-Da: These two werewolves go with Richard to visit Anita in North Carolina.
- Irving: Jason and Anita enroll Irving's help as a news reporter to try to take back the rumor that Anita left Jean-Claude for Jason. Originally, Irving was thrilled to have an insider's scoop on Jean-Claude and other Anita-related topics, but people were beginning to wonder how he was so close to it all. Therefore, Anita left him out of it, albeit rather abruptly.

Non-recurring characters as of late include:

- Alex Pinn: a tiger with red stripes, who is a closeted news reporter.
- Crispin: a white tiger from Las Vegas.
- J. J: an Jason's childhood friend and current girlfriend.

== Critical reception ==
When debuted, Blood Noir made the #1 spot on the New York Times Best Sellers list. By early July, it had fallen to number 25.
