= Danse Macabre (novel) =

2006 novel by Laurell K. Hamilton

- Author: Laurell K. Hamilton
- Language: English
- Series: Anita Blake: Vampire Hunter
- Genre: Horror, mystery, erotic
- Publisher: Berkley Books (Berkley edition)
- Publication date: June 27, 2006 (Berkley edition)
- Publication place: United States
- Media type: Print
- Pages: 496 (Berkley edition)
- ISBN: 0-425-20797-8 (Berkley edition)
- OCLC: 66526961
- Dewey Decimal: 813/.54 22
- LC Class: PS3558.A443357 D36 2006
- Preceded by: Micah
- Followed by: The Harlequin

Danse Macabre is a horror/mystery/erotica novel by American writer Laurell K. Hamilton, the fourteenth book in the Anita Blake: Vampire Hunter series.

== Explanation of the title ==
Danse Macabre is French for "Dance of Death". The phrase historically refers to a late-medieval allegory of the universality of death, in which Death personified summons people to the world beyond the grave despite their objections. Originally a dramatic performance, in the centuries since it has been represented in art, poetry, and music.

The modern superstition is simply that "Death" appears at midnight every year on Halloween. He calls forth the dead from their graves to dance for him while he plays his fiddle. The skeletons dance until the rooster crows at dawn, when they must return to their graves until the next year.

Within the novel, "Danse Macabre" is the name of the vampire ballet company that performs during the course of the novel's events. It also refers to the general "vampire politics" that serve as the central conflict in the plot. Although "Danse Macabre" is also the name of a vampire-themed nightclub owned by Jean-Claude, the nightclub appears only briefly at the end of this novel.

== Plot summary ==
=== Summary ===
Danse Macabre appears to take place a few weeks after the events of Incubus Dreams and almost immediately after the events of Micah, assuming that the series of serial killings that Anita's friend Ronnie refers to as occurring two weeks earlier are the killings Anita investigates in Incubus Dreams.

Unlike the previous thirteen novels, neither Anita's role as a Federal Marshal nor her job as a zombie animator plays any part in this novel. Instead, Anita must juggle a series of problems arising from her own increasing power, Jean-Claude's vampire politics, and her own personal life, complicated in this case by Anita's apparent pregnancy.

- First, Anita believes that she may be pregnant. This forces her to confront the difficult choice of whether to bring the child to term, as well as whether to inform the various potential fathers. (Richard, Nathaniel, Jean-Claude, Asher, and Damian).
  - Richard and Nathaniel are the most likely candidates for fatherhood, since Micah had a lycanthrope vasectomy (silver clamps on the vas deferens) and, while vampires in this world are capable of fathering a child (either via sperm created prior to their death for the newly dead or if their body temperature is kept elevated for a long enough period of time to create new sperm) the likelihood goes down with age. A vampire over the age of 100 is not a likely candidate.
  - Micah and Nathaniel are willing to rearrange their lives to take on the primary parenting responsibilities. By contrast, Richard proposes monogamous marriage and expects that Anita will stop being a vampire executioner and federal marshal.
  - A child of Anita's would have a significant risk of birth defects. Previous books have mentioned "Vlad Syndrome", occurring in children of vampires, which in severe cases results in death of both the child and the mother. Anita is also at risk of "Mowgli Syndrome", which can occur when a shapeshifter has intercourse in animal (or part-animal) form. Not all details are discussed, but it is noted that the fetus can develop at the rate of the beast instead of human — which could put Anita past her jurisdiction's legal abortion threshold in only a few weeks or months, depending on the animal.
- Second, Anita's increasing powers continue to lead to new problems. In particular, Anita is attempting to select a pomme de sang from a variety of candidates, leading to a series of conflicts between various persons who wish to join her harem of lovers. In addition, she discovers that her ardeur has been shaping both her own and her lovers' feelings and personalities, making Anita question whether her love for Micah and Nathaniel is real. Finally, Anita discovers that she may be a pan-were, and that in addition to being the dominant female of the local wolf and leopard pack, she may also become Regina, or Queen, of the local werelion pack, leading to a conflict between the lions eager to become her Rex, or lion king.
- Third, Anita is involved in a variety of conflicts relating to vampire politics, largely relating to Jean-Claude's decision to invite a vampire ballet and several master vampires to St. Louis.
  - Augustine, the master of Chicago, Illinois, attempts to force Anita to love him, and hopes to control the local were-lion pack by introducing a dominant were-lion of his choosing.
  - Thea—who is not only the wife of the master of Cape Cod but a siren—wishes Anita to sleep with one or all of her three sons, in the hope that Anita can bring them into their power.
  - Merlin, head of the vampire ballet, attempts to mentally dominate all of the master vampires and lycanthropes present at the performance, for reasons he will not reveal.
  - Meng Die is becoming increasingly jealous of Anita's irresistibility to the men in their circle, to the point where she attempts to kill Requiem
  - Both Belle Morte and The Mother of Darkness continue their attempts to dominate Anita.

Ultimately, Anita resolves most of these conflicts:

- After reluctantly deciding to have the baby, Anita ultimately learns that she is not pregnant, and that her positive test result was caused by her unique body chemistry.
- Anita learns to accept that her love may be manufactured in part by the ardeur, particularly in the cases of Nathaniel and Micah, both of whom have had their personalities shaped by the ardeur to meet Anita's needs (and vice versa). She accepts that she possesses several metaphysical "beasts," and rejects Haven, a dominant were-lion that Augustine hoped to use to dominate the St. Louis pack.
- Anita is also able to navigate most of the challenges raised by vampire politics.
  - Using the ardeur, Anita and Jean-Claude bind Augustine, increasing their own power. They also turn the tables on him by feeding not only on him, but on his entourage. (Although Anita now loves Augustine, she is sufficiently stubborn that this love does not gain him an advantage).
  - Anita promises to sleep with Thea's oldest son to see if she can raise his powers through the ardeur.
  - Anita defeats Merlin's attempt to dominate the assembled vampires and shape-shifters, and questions him for information about the Mother of Darkness.
  - The combined threat of Anita, Jean-Claude, and all of their vampires is enough to make Meng Die agree not to kill anyone for the night.
  - Anita is able to evade Belle Morte and the Mother of Darkness's attempts to control her, although she continues to fear them.

=== Unresolved plotlines ===
Due to the small amount of time lapsed in this novel (the events last only a day), Anita is unable to resolve any of the plotlines left open in Incubus Dreams, and leaves several questions unresolved in this book as well.

- Although the epilogue to Incubus Dreams stated that Anita intended to investigate the Stevie Brown murder soon, the narration does not reveal whether Anita has made progress in her investigation.
- Danse Macabre does not reveal whether Gregory and Stephen have learned anything about why their father has reappeared, a plotline that was mentioned, but not resolved, in Cerulean Sins and Incubus Dreams.
- Anita mentions that Jean-Claude has bound a few of Malcolm's vampires to his own service, but there is no apparent resolution of the threat presented by the remainder of his vampires, none of whom have sworn blood oaths to anyone.
- Anita does not appear to have made any progress on her hunt for Vittorio and his vampires.
- Although The Mother of Darkness continues to make threats, it remains to be seen when she will actually awake, or what will become of Belle Morte's challenge for council leadership.
- Anita has now promised to sleep with Thea's son in an attempt to raise his powers as a siren.
- Although Anita has sent Haven back to Chicago, she nevertheless needs to select a lion to match with her inner lioness, and any lion of sufficient power to match her may threaten Joseph's hold on his pride.
- Although Anita suspects she is now a pan-were, she has not yet shifted form, and doesn't know if she will assume the form of a single animal, all the species with which she is infected, or none of them. In addition, blood tests show that Anita has an "unknown strain" of lycanthropy, which she has not yet identified. And there is a possibility that she got an additional one with the blood transfusion at the end of the book.

== Characters ==
=== Major characters ===
Danse Macabre features the following major characters.

- Anita Blake: Anita continues her acceptance of her supernatural powers and unusual lifestyle. In particular, Anita accepts that the ardeur may have shaped Micah's, Nathaniel's, and her personalities to make them more compatible partners for one another. Anita also seems only momentarily concerned by the discoveries that she may be a shape-shifter or that her roles as a succubus and as Regina of the local were-lion pride may require her to take on several new lovers. In her personal life, while she continues to resist the idea of permitting her lovers (other than Richard) to take female lovers in addition to her, Anita begins to accept the idea of her lovers taking other male lovers, particularly in the case of Jean-Claude and Asher.
- Jean-Claude: After several books in which he struggled to maintain his hold as Master of St. Louis, Jean-Claude appears to have reached a position of relative comfort. He has now assembled a formidable group of master vampires, and, through Anita and Richard, enjoys good relations with most of the city's lycanthropes. Personally, his relationship with Asher is at its best in centuries, while Anita appears to have largely accepted her role as his human servant and embraced the ardeur. He and Anita block two challenges Augustine relatively easily and may have bent Augustine to their will by addicting him to their combined ardeur. Jean-Claude's major remaining problems appear to be his relationship with Richard, who struggles against the idea of a closer political or personal relationship with Jean-Claude, and the possibility of a challenge by the Vampire Council, the Mother of Darkness, or an alliance of other City Masters threatened by Jean-Claude and Anita's rapidly growing power.
- Richard: Hamilton continues to develop Richard's relationships with Anita and Jean-Claude and his acceptance of his own supernatural nature, although the development in each area continues to lag far behind Anita's parallel journey. As usual, Richard alternates violently between deep resentment of Anita and Jean-Claude and acceptance of his relationship with each of them, but he appears to be accepting his relationships and his supernatural nature, albeit more slowly than Anita. Although he continues to resent both of them, and to search for a permanent girlfriend to replace Anita, Richard largely accepts that he is part of the triumvirate. While he continues to hope that Anita will "settle down" with him alone, he appears willing to accept his and Anita's sexual relationship until something better comes along.
- Jason: Jason has only a minor role in this novel, largely continuing to support his friends Anita and Nathaniel. In addition, he has apparently developed into one of Anita's occasional sex partners, and reports that he has "checked out" one of the visitors.
- Micah: Michah's role in this novel is also fairly minimal. Although Micah accompanies Anita for many of the events of the novel, his major plot contributions are as one of Anita's sex partners and as a focus for Richard's jealousy. Like Nathaniel, Micah is very supportive of whatever choice Anita makes when she believes she might be pregnant, and, like Nathaniel, Micah appears unconcerned by the possibility that the ardeur has shaped his personality to meet Anita's needs.
- Nathaniel: Danse Macabre shows Nathaniel's ongoing maturation. Either as a result of his growing older, his triumvirate with Anita and Damian, or both, Nathaniel has developed into a more mature and less needy person than in earlier novels. According to Anita, Nathaniel has grown taller, and we see him challenge Ronnie, Richard, and Anita's various suitors, an action that would be unthinkable when the character was first introduced.
- Asher: Danse Macabre heightens Asher's apparent role as representative of the darker sides of Anita's sexual awakening. Anita accepts that she has become addicted to the limitless pleasure that Asher can bring, and both Anita and Asher accept, for the first time, that Anita's love for Asher is real and not simply an artifact of her connection with Jean-Claude. However, loving Asher comes with a price for Anita, both emotional, as she surrenders her self-control more completely than she has with any of her other lovers, and physical, as Anita and Asher lose control under the force of their combined powers, nearly killing Anita. In addition, Asher continues to come into his own power as a master vampire, gaining the power to call hyenas and werehyenas.
- Damian: Damian continues to be one of the more passive of Anita's primary harem. His major roles in Danse Macabre seem to be appearing when Anita needs to share his self-control and occasionally threatening to die unless Anita has sex to generate more power to sustain him.

=== Other characters ===
Recurring characters include:

- Ronnie: Ronnie continues her fight with Anita, which has been resolving, then flaring up, for the last few novels. Under questioning from Anita and Nathaniel, Ronnie ultimately admits that she is scared of commitment with Louis, and jealous of Anita's harem.
- Requiem: Requiem ends up hooked on the ardeur, a problem which is continually addressed throughout the book.
- Meng Die: In this novel, Hamilton develops Meng Die's character, revealing that (1) Meng Die does not possess any form of the ardeur; (2) she is powerful and ambitious enough that her last master was glad to see her go, rather than risk the chance that Meng Die would depose him; and (3) that Meng Die is deeply resentful of Anita because most or all of Meng Die's lovers prefer Anita to her. Although Meng Die ends the novel promising not to kill anyone that evening, Hamilton seems to be setting her up for later conflict with Jean-Claude or Anita.
- Graham: A werewolf of Richard's pack who wants to be one of the people Anita feeds off of.
- Claudia: In this novel, Claudia shows herself to be Anita's most reliable bodyguard, as well as one of the few women with whom Anita can discuss her various problems.
- Fredo:
- Joseph: Rex of the St. Louis Pride (Were-lion Leader)
- Valentina:
- Wicked: A master vampire.
- Truth: Wicked's brother and also a vampire. He's almost killed to capture a fleeing vampire from The Church of Eternal on Anita's command.
- London: A master vampire of Bella Morte's line that recently moved to St. Louis often called "The Dark Knight". He can feed the ardeur every two hours, making him a potential potent Pomme de Sang, but as drawback he becomes addicted to the ardeur. London made a deal with Jean-Claude to protect him from his addiction, and Belle Morte who had used it against him.

Non-recurring characters include:

- Elinore:
- Samuel: Master of Cape Cod; Animal to call is mermaids.
- Leucothea: "Thea" is a siren, and is Samuel's wife.
- Sampson: Samuel and Thea's oldest son.
- Thomas: One of Samuel and Thea's twin sons.
- Cristof: One of Samuel and Thea's twin sons.
- Augustine: Master of the City of Chicago; Craves the ardeur; animal to calls are lions.
- Haven: A potential Rex to Anita's Regina; under command of Augustine.
- Pierce: A werelion under command of Augustine.
- Merlin: Unofficially the Merlin of urban legend. A very powerful master vampire created by Marmee Noir who runs a ballet tour of other vampires. Animal to call: birds
- Adonis: Part of Merlin's travelling dance troupe.

== Critical reception ==
The critical reception of Danse Macabre has been mixed.

Robert Folsom of the Kansas City Star wrote a critical review, stating:

after 13 erotically charged books, boredom has reared its ugly head for the 14th novel in Laurell K. Hamilton's Anita Blake series, "Danse Macabre" (Berkley; $25.95), as eroticism becomes mere description... So the stage is set for intrigue. Yet the words and actions Hamilton has her characters say and do seem more of a writing exercise than elements of true portrayal.

In contrast, a Denver Post review took a more positive view of the eroticism in Hamilton's work. Although the Post review noted that "[t]hose looking for mystery and mayhem on this Anita adventure are out of luck" and "it will be interesting to see how long Hamilton can sustain a large audience while avoiding the sort of solid plots that were characteristic of her earlier novels," the review was largely positive, writing that "the main attraction of the Anita Blake novels in the past five years has been their erotic novelty," and "[f]ew, if any, mainstream novels delve so deeply into pure, unadulterated erotica."
