= Bloody Bones (novel) =

1996 novel by Laurell K. Hamilton

- Author: Laurell K. Hamilton
- Cover artist: Lee McLeod (Ace edition)
- Language: English
- Series: Anita Blake: Vampire Hunter
- Genre: Mystery, horror
- Publisher: Ace Books
- Publication date: 1996 (Ace edition)
- Publication place: United States
- Media type: Print (Paperback)
- Pages: 370 (Ace edition)
- ISBN: 0-441-00374-5 (Ace edition)
- OCLC: 35453173
- Preceded by: The Lunatic Cafe
- Followed by: The Killing Dance

Bloody Bones is a horror/mystery novel by American writer Laurell K. Hamilton, the fifth book in the Anita Blake: Vampire Hunter series.

== Reception ==
Dan Davidson of the Whitehorse Star stated that he "detests" the book's marketing as it is "nowhere near as graphic as the book covers would suggest." Michelle West of The Magazine of Fantasy & Science Fiction called it the "perfect rushing-through-holiday-hell type of stopover, something that demands reaction, even demands to be liked, without demanding the work you're probably too exhausted for."
