= Anita Blake =

Anita Katerine Blake
- First appearance: Guilty Pleasures (1993)
- Created by: Laurell K. Hamilton

In-universe information
- Nicknames: Ma petite, The Executioner, Lupa, Little Queen, 'Nita, Gatita Negra, Anna, Kiddo, War, Queen, Dark Queen
- Species: Human, Necromancer, Succubus
- Gender: Female
- Occupation: Animator, Federal Marshal, Vampire executioner/hunter, Human Servant, Nimir-Ra, Regina, Bolverk
- Family: father (unnamed); Judith (step-mother); Andrea (step-sister); Josh (half-brother); Grandmother Blake; Grandmother Flores
- Significant others: Jean-Claude (lover/Master); Richard Zeeman (ex-fiance ) Asher (lover); Nathaniel Graison (lover/Leopard to call); Micah Callahan (lover/Nimir-Raj); Damian (vampire servant); Jason Schuyler (Wolf to call); Crispin (White Tiger to call); Domino (Black Tiger to call) (deceased); Jade - Yiyú (Black Tiger to call/First Female Lover); Cynric (Blue Tiger to call); Mephistopheles (Gold Tiger to call); Alex (Red Tiger to call); Nicky (Bride/Lion); Rodrigo (Bride/Leopard) (deceased); Rodina (Bride/Leopard); Ru (Bride/Leopard)

Anita Blake is the title and viewpoint character of the Anita Blake: Vampire Hunter series by Laurell K. Hamilton. The series takes place in a parallel world in which supernatural characters like vampires and werewolves exist alongside regular humans, with Blake's jobs including the re-animation of the dead as well as the hunting and executing of supernatural creatures (mostly vampires) that have broken the law. Hamilton stated that she created the character after perceiving a gender inequality in detective fiction, with female characters rarely getting the same treatment as male heroes of the genre.

== Description ==
Anita Blake is a petite woman of mixed German and Mexican heritage with curly long raven hair and pale skin with scars scattered over her body. She is very direct and flippant in her speech, but is said to be highly competent in the professions she is involved in. At the start of the series, she is an animator (a person who raises zombies) and a vampire executioner. She is trained in several forms of hand-to-hand combat as well as in the use of several firearms, with her firearm of preference being the Browning BDM. Blake practices Christianity and is currently of the Episcopal faith, having left Catholicism since the Catholic Church has excommunicated all animators. In the short story "Dancing" she describes herself as being 5'3 inches tall, as well as in Laughing Corpse, Ch. 1.

Blake is known to be carrying between four and five strains of the lycanthropy virus. As of Affliction, Anita carries wolf, leopard, lion, hyena, as well as several different colors of tiger. This is considered to be unusual in the Vampire Hunter universe, with very few other characters possessing more than one form of lycanthropy.

=== Knowledge and abilities ===
- Necromancer: Anita is one of the most powerful living animators in St. Louis at the beginning of the series, with her powers eventually making her one of the strongest animators in history. Her level of ability has been shown to exert power over both vampires and the undead, with her being capable of raising lifelike zombies.
- Combat Training: Anita has a black belt in Judo as of the first book. In Obsidian Butterfly she is also studying Kenpo Karate. Later (Affliction) she started MMA training. She works out regularly, first with her best friend Ronnie "to be able to outrun the bad guys" when she needs to, then with Circus of the Damned guards. She credits Edward (Federal Marshall Theodore "Ted" Forrester, The Death) for much of her training in weapons, primarily handguns and knives. She is primarily right-handed, but she can fight with her left hand.
- Detective Training: Though she rarely uses these skills in later novels, Anita has been involved with many investigations with RPIT and in the later books with the FBI. Her police contact, Rudolph Storr, routinely requires her to engage in independent crime scene reconstruction in order to obtain an analysis—Anita's reconstructions are almost always correct and frequently include insights that the police have missed. Anita thinks like both a cop and a monster, according to some, which is what makes her so insightful.
- Supernatural Experience: Anita holds a bachelor's degree in preternatural biology and is a trained Vampire executioner. She is able to resist the mental influence of Jean-Claude's, a vampire who is also her love interest. In the later books Anita has given Damian, her Vampire servant, the fourth mark. This does not interfere with Jean Claude's marks. It is uncertain if this unconventional fourth mark grants Anita immortality.
- Triumvirate Member: Anita is a member of a "triumvirate" with Jean-Claude and her additional love interest Richard Zeeman (The Killing Dance). At first the only effect is their powers boosting when they are together, even more so when touching. (The usefulness of the triumvirate varies with the interpersonal conflicts between Richard, Jean-Claude and Anita.) In later novels she creates a secondary triumvirate with Nathaniel as her wereleopard to call and Damian as her vampire servant.
- Vampire Powers: The combination of her necromancy and her membership in the triumvirate has caused Anita to develop a series of powers formerly seen only in Vampires, which includes the ardeur, a sexual power that allows her to feed from other supernatural creatures and humans.
- Vampire Marks: In the Anita Blake world Master Vampires can create a mystic link with a human or with an animal to call. The creation of such a link is a four-step process; steps are called marks and it is understood that a Master Vampire "gives" the marks to subjugate a human or wereanimal. A human which received all four marks is a Human Servant to Master Vampire; a wereanimal (or siren, or ghost, or selkie, etc.) which received all four marks is The Animal to Call (as opposed to an animal to call). Each mark gives both sides of the marking process new abilities. Without any mental precautions a pair Master Vampire - Human Servant may become one personality in two bodies (Kiss the Dead, Chapter 45). Anita Blake received unknowingly the first two marks from Jean-Claude in Guilty Pleasures, then the third mark in Circus of the Damned; then Master Vampire Alejandro took her over with all four marks, which made her capable to kill Alejandro with her bare hands, thus wiping all marks. In Killing Dance Anita Blake accepted voluntarily the first three marks from Jean-Claude to save his life and Richard Zeeman's life. In Incubus Dreams, Chapter 13 Anita Blake, acting as Master Vampire, accidentally gave all four marks to both Damian and Nathaniel Graison, thus forming her own Triumvirate of Power.
- Power Mimicry: "It was almost as if the more often I was used by, or borrowed magic from, someone else, the more likely it became that their magic would become part of my arsenal." Anita discussing this ability in Chapter 47 of Danse Macabre.

== Character biography ==
=== Early years ===
Anita Blake was born with the power of necromancy, a power that she inherited from her grandmother. Her mother died in a car accident when Anita was 8, which greatly impacted her throughout her childhood and adult years. When Anita was 10, her father remarried after her mother's death to Judith, whom Anita often clashed with over her powers and differences. Anita could 'see' ghosts, and raised her dead pet dog and even road kill, to her, her father and step-mothers dismay. Anita initially exerted little control over her powers, eventually leading her father to request that her maternal grandmother teach Anita how to "turn off" her abilities. Her Maternal Grandmother taught her how to control her abilities, but seeing how powerful Anita was, encouraged Anita's dad to raise her as a Christian instead of vaudun. During college she raised a professor who had killed himself-her roommate moved out the next day. Anita majored in preternatural biology and became engaged to a fellow student, who later broke off the engagement due to his parents disapproving of him dating a Mexican woman. He was her first sexual experience. This would cause Anita to remain celibate for much of the initial books in the series (until The Killing Dance). After graduation Anita was recruited by Bert Vaughn to join Animators, Inc. as a professional zombie animator, where she was trained by Manny Rodriguez and became a licensed vampire executioner. She also met Edward, and learned about weapons. During the events in First Death she met the vampire hunter Edward and received several of her scars, which includes a cross-shaped brand on her arm.

=== Books 1–5 ===
In the first novel (Guilty Pleasures) Anita receives her first marks from the vampire Jean-Claude and begins to gain advanced healing powers and abilities. By the end of the book she has become instrumental in removing the previous Master Vampire of the City Nikolaos from power by killing her and has received two of the four marks necessary to become Jean-Claude's Human Servant. These marks also enhance her necromancy powers, with Jean-Claude remarking in The Laughing Corpse that he could feel her power calling to him at the end of the book. In the third novel (Circus of the Damned) Anita meets high school science teacher and closet werewolf Richard Zeeman and begins dating him. She is also attacked by rival vampire Alejandro, who too marks her as his Human Servant, which cancels out the control that Jean-Claude previously exerted through the marks he had given her.

In (The Lunatic Cafe) Anita becomes engaged to Richard, only to have Jean-Claude quickly blackmail her into dating him after learning of the engagement. Anita also meets Raina, the lupa of the local wolf pack, as well as Jason, a young werewolf. Anita's powers grow in (Bloody Bones), as does her relationship with Jean-Claude.

=== Books 6–10 ===
In (The Killing Dance) Richard has become the Ulfric, or leader, of his pack after killing off the previous leader Marcus. Anita herself kills Raina, who later inhabits Anita's body, both antagonizing her as well as giving her the ability to heal others. It is during this book that Anita forms a triumvirate with Richard and Jean-Claude as well as accepting further vampire marks from him. This makes it impossible for Anita to separate herself from Richard or Jean-Claude, which is further exacerbated when Anita breaks her engagement with Richard and becomes Jean-Claude's lover after watching Richard eat Marcus and transform into his wolf form. Despite this, Anita's magical bonds with the two are further strengthened throughout the series and Anita is still considered to be the "lupa" or female leader of the pack despite her relationship issues with Richard. Anita becomes the protector of the local were-leopard pack in (Burnt Offerings), a role that places her alongside the were-leopard Nathaniel, who has expressed a sexual interest in Anita.

Her relationship with Richard is somewhat reconciled in (Blue Moon) when she travels to Tennessee to clear him of rape charges. Her powers continue expanding, as Damian begins showing signs of being Anita's vampire servant. During this book she also begins learning magic through the Wiccan Marianne in an attempt to help teach Anita how to close off her metaphysical ties to Richard and Jean-Claude in an attempt to keep from being overwhelmed by them. This proves to be detrimental to Richard and Jean-Claude in (Obsidian Butterfly), where she learns from a powerful vampire in New Mexico that it weakens all three of them. It is also during this novel that Anita is introduced to the serial killer Olaf, who becomes infatuated with Anita becoming his "serial killer sweetie", partially because she fits what he looks for in a victim. In (Narcissus in Chains) the damage done to her friends and allies from the closing off of the marks is further shown, with Damian having become a feral killing machine in her absence, confirming that he is her vampire servant. During this book Anita also contracts several strains of lycanthropy after being injured by a wereleopard and Chimera, the split personality of Orlando King, a lycanthrope hunter. Anita also becomes sexually involved with the were-leopard Micah, who becomes her Nimir-Raj and mate by the end of the book. It is during Narcissus in Chains that Anita develops the ardeur through Jean-Claude, a rare sexual power that allows Anita to draw power through lust but also initially requires that she has sex multiple times a day to keep it under control. This power causes the official end of Anita's relationship with Richard after she is forced to feed off of him, although she still serves as the lupa and punisher of the St. Louis wolf pack. At the end of the novel, Anita has yet to physically shift into any one form of lycanthrope. She has started a complex romantic and sexual relationship with Jean-Claude, Micah and Nathaniel, who she has begun to use as a source of food for the ardeur.

=== Books 11–15 ===
Anita takes on further lovers through the next few books, partially due to the needs of the ardeur as well as to extend protection from other vampire Masters, as seen in (Cerulean Sins) where she takes Asher as a lover in order to outmaneuver Belle Morte. Her closeness with the supernatural world causes issues with her job as a U.S. Marshall, with Lt. Rudolph "Dolph" Storr expressing extreme disapproval of her romantic and sexual choices and attempting to have one of her lovers, Jason, imprisoned for being a shapeshifter. In (Incubus Dreams) she begins to exhibit control over the ardeur but accidentally forms a triumvirate with Damian and Nathaniel. During this time Anita shows reluctance to let her sexual partners have other lovers, which she eventually eases up on through the course of the series. The formation of the second triumvirate allows Anita's powers to develop to where she has the ability to raise an entire cemetery without the use of human sacrifice.

Anita has a pregnancy scare in (Danse Macabre), as the ardeur's control over her made it difficult to consistently use birth control during each feeding. She also discovers that her ardeur is seeking out people powerful enough to be "food" and has the potential to shape personalities to be more compatible relationship-wise. Anita gains the ability to pass the need to shape-shift onto others, although she can only pass the need on to others of the same strain of lycanthropy. During the novel Anita begins to accept that she has become a succubus, with her powers resembling that of a vampire. During this time, Anita is frequently visited and harassed by Marmee Noir, the Mother of All Darkness that has been sleeping for years.

As a result of her growing powers Anita manages to overpower the extremely old and very strong vampire force named the Harlequin that was sent after her in The Harlequin, but only after having to feed off of the leaders of the various lycanthrope groups in St. Louis in order to heal the others in her group and supply them with power. It is during this time that the leader of the were-lion group, Joseph, refuses to have sex with Anita since he is married; this leads to his exile and potential death. At the end of The Harlequin it is discovered that the Harlequin were not operating on official Council orders and were planning to take over Jean-Claude's territory.

=== Books 16–21 ===
Marmee Noir's attacks on Blake intensify and in Blood Noir she manages to "roll" Blake for two days during a visit to Asheville, North Carolina, during which Marmee Noir forces her to have sex with two were-tigers that were in the area. Blake also discovers that her anger and rage have been affecting those around her, specifically Richard. He is eventually released from that anger, gaining a power in the process and Anita learns that she can feed from feelings of anger as much as from lust and that Jason has become her wolf to call. Blake's troubles with Marmee Noir continue in Skin Trade in which she is also attacked by the ancient vampire Vittorio, who attempts and fails to make her his Human Servant. However, under Vittorio's influence, Blake is once again forced to have sex with several were-tigers, one of which is a sixteen-year-old boy and virgin. Blake's ardeur powers reach a head in Flirt when she uses it in self-defense against a were-lion (Nicky) that had kidnapped her to perform a zombie raising for his client, only for Nicky to have all of his free will taken away and to become Anita's "slave". At the end of Skin Trade Marmee Noir's body was destroyed, however in Bullet her spirit returns to attack Anita and the Vampire Council. Marmee Noir's previous plan was to have a powerful were-tiger impregnate Anita and then to possess the unborn infant, but her plans shift to her taking over Anita's body or kill her in the process. She's ultimately defeated by Anita in Hit List, despite Marmee Noir having the Harlequin assist her in this task.

Blake's ongoing relationships become even more complicated by the end of Kiss the Dead, as one of the were-tigers she had sex with in Skin Trade (Cynric) has moved to St. Louis to be with her, but is still only seventeen at the beginning of the novel. Her tentative relationship with Asher is also on hold and potentially over, as he is sent away to potentially become the Master of a different city due to him attacking her out of jealousy. This plot element is further complicated in Affliction after Jean Claude and Blake bring Asher back home because they and several others miss him as well as because Asher has been purposely alienating people in each city he visited. During the events in Affliction Blake also gains the ability to call hyenas after she was forced to shoot one of her were-hyena guards while he was being controlled by the Lover of Death, who was previously thought to be dead. Currently Blake has agreed to marry Jean Claude, Micah, and Nathaniel in a dedication ceremony, but has decided to place the ceremony on hold due to potential problems that some of her various men have with the arrangement.

== See also ==
- List of Anita Blake: Vampire Hunter characters
- Anita Blake: Vampire Hunter
- Laurell K. Hamilton
