= Glossary of BDSM =

Jargon and esoteric terms used in BDSM

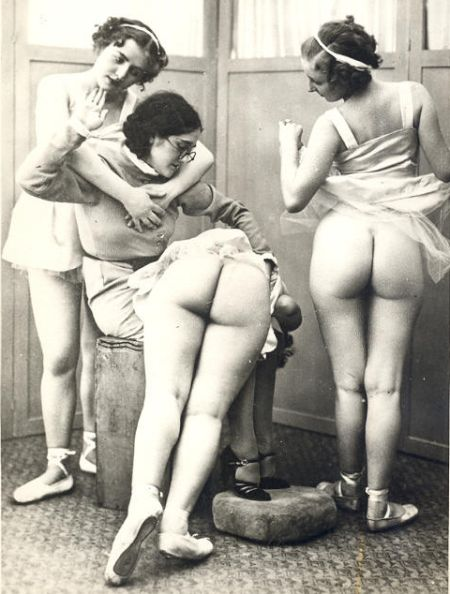
Erotic spanking image taken at Studio Biederer, Paris, 1930

This glossary of BDSM (an initialism for bondage, discipline, domination, submission, sadism, and masochism) defines terms commonly used in the BDSM community.

BDSM activities are described as play in BDSM terminology.

== Etymology ==
BDSM abbreviations have their origins in classified personal advertisements, where euphemisms for paraphilic and socially disapproved practices were required by periodical editors to circumvent censorship and obscenity law. BDSM abbreviations describe sexual relationship dynamics that can be observed within certain communities.

The term BDSM is a portmanteau of initialisms intended to encompass all of the following activities:

- Bondage and discipline (B & D or B/D);
- Dominance and submission (D & S or D/s) (including "master and slave" role-playing scenarios and ongoing relationship structures);
- Sadism and masochism (S & M or S/M);

== BDSM glossary ==
- 24/7: A relationship in which protocols are in place continuously or indefinitely.
- Abrasion: Use of friction (usually with a rough surface) against the receptive partner. May be used to sensitize an area of skin or to stimulate sensation on an area of the body.
- Abduction Play: A type of play involving prior consent to simulate or role play an Abduction, often with elements of Consensual Non-Consent and Fear play. May also be part of a consensual Captive/Captor dynamic.
- Adult baby/diaper lover (ABDL): A form of ageplay; adult babies receive gratification from role-playing an infant. This can involve submission on the adult baby's part. Diaper lovers receive gratification from the wearing and often using of diapers. Whilst these two paraphilias are distinct, it is common that a person who enjoys one will also enjoy the other to some degree.
- Aftercare: The time after a BDSM scene or play session in which the participants calm down, discuss the previous events and their personal reactions to them, and slowly come back in touch with reality. This is particularly important during intense sexual roleplaying activities. Aftercare is up to people involved and does not have one set look.
- BDSM: Bondage & discipline, dominance & submission, and sadism & masochism: a combined acronym often used as a catchall for anything in the kink scene.
- Blackmail: Commonly referred to as consensual blackmail. Where a submissive provides material that would be undesirable or have social or career consequences for them if it was made public, in order to force them to stay in a relationship. The material can also be in the form of naked photos or videos of them or such material taken as part of BDSM sessions. Commonly used as part of consensual non-consent where they can only refuse to perform an activity or have an action performed if such material is released to the public or some individuals.
- Blood Play: A type of play involving the intentional use of (usually fake) blood for enjoyment or fetishization of the blood-related activity or of the blood itself.
- Bondage: Acts involving the physical restraint of a partner. Bondage typically refers to total restraint, but it can be limited to a particular body part, such as breast bondage. People can be bound with rope, chains, tape, ribbon, zip ties, or other materials. See also "self-bondage".
- Bottom: One who receives physical sensation from a top in a scene; the receiving partner.
- Brat / Bratting: A sub who behaves disobediently, mischievously, or uncontrollably; often to provoke a response. This dynamic is consented to by both parties, where the top is often referred to as a "brat tamer". Brats are typically argumentative and requires more work for a dominant partner to tame.
- Breast bondage: The act of tying breasts so that they are either flattened against the chest or they bulge.
- Breast torture: Torture of the breasts.
- Breath control play: Restriction of oxygen to heighten sexual arousal and orgasm. Methods to achieve this include strangulation, suffocation, and smothering.
- Butt plug: A sex toy that is designed to be inserted into the rectum for sexual pleasure. They come in a variety of sizes; some can vibrate. Sometimes used in Petplay, with a tail attached. Some plugs have a locking mechanism that can increase the erotic or humiliation factor by preventing self-removal.
- Chastity: A form of erotic sexual denial or orgasm denial whereby a person is prevented (often with a locking device) from access to, or stimulation of, their genitals, save at the whim or choice of their partner.
- Cock and ball torture: (CBT): Torture of the penis and testicles for sexual gratification.
- Collared: Submissive or slave who is owned, usually (but certainly not exclusively) in a loving intimate relationship. A dominant may have multiple persons collared. Also: a pup's status, as differentiated from a "stray".
- Collaring: The formal acceptance by a dominant of a sub's service. Also, the ceremony when a dominant commits to a sub (much like a wedding or other contract).
- Contract: A document laying out and formalizing all aspects of the dynamic, to include details such as expectations of behaviour, dynamic type, hard and soft limits, types of play or activities involved, etc.
- Contrapolar stimulation: "Hurts so good!” A type of physical stimulation that incorporates feeling of both pleasure and pain.
- Consensual non-consent: (CNC): An agreement where parties act as if consent has been waived. Also known as blanket consent. Consent is given in advance for some or any actions, and the dominant has the discretion to continue with any action or activity, even after the subject would have otherwise indicated they wish to withdraw consent. Not to be confused with 'rape play'.
- Consent: Mutual agreement to terms of action, as in a scene or ongoing BDSM relationship.
- D/s: Dominance/submission: play or relationships that involve a psychologically based power exchange.
- DD/lg: Roleplaying where a "Daddy Dom" acts as a paternal figure to a "little girl" submissive. This dynamic is not necessarily sexual and is centered around trust and care.
- Dungeon Monitor/Master (DM): A person who supervises the interactions between participants at a play party or dungeon to enforce house rules—essentially, the bouncer of a BDSM event. They may also help in basic ways, such as giving water to participants.
- Dom: A person who exercises control (from dominant – contrasted with sub). This term is generally used for male dominants, but can be used for anyone regardless of gender.
- Dominant: A person who exercises control – in contrast with a submissive.
- Domme: A female dominant (see also Dominatrix).
- Domspace: The euphoric state of mind a dom may enter during a scene. May include an intensified perception of the scene.
- Dungeon: A room or area containing BDSM equipment and space for scenes. This room can be specially designed for BDSM or can be a room converted into a dungeon.
- Edgeplay: Higher risk activity, physically and/or emotionally. Because the definition of edgeplay is subjective to the specific players (i.e., what is risky for one person may not be as risky for another), there is not a universal list of what is included in edgeplay. Examples may include bloodplay, breath play and gunplay.
- Enema play: Gratifying or sensual sexual arousal experienced from enemas. Enemas are also used in sadomasochistic activities for erotic humiliation or physical discomfort.
- Erotic humiliation: Humiliating someone during a sexual act. This act could be either verbal or physical (for example, insulting a partner, making a partner display their private parts to a group of people, or even urinating or defecating on a partner). It can be a great source of pleasure for some people.
- Erotic sexual denial: Keeping another person aroused while delaying or preventing resolution of the feelings, to keep them in a continual state of anticipatory tension, inner conflict, and heightened sensitivity. (See also tease and denial and chastity.)
- Erotic spanking: The act of spanking another person for the sexual arousal or gratification of either or both parties.
- Figging: Insertion of a piece of peeled ginger root into the anus, vagina, or urethra.
- Financial domination: (Also known as money slavery or findom) is a sexual fetish associated with a practice of dominance and submission, where a submissive (money slave, finsub, paypig, human ATM, or cash piggy) will give material items and money to a financial dominant (money Mistress/Master, findomme/findom, money Dom/Domme or cash Master/Mistress).
- Fisting: Inserting a hand into the vagina or rectum.
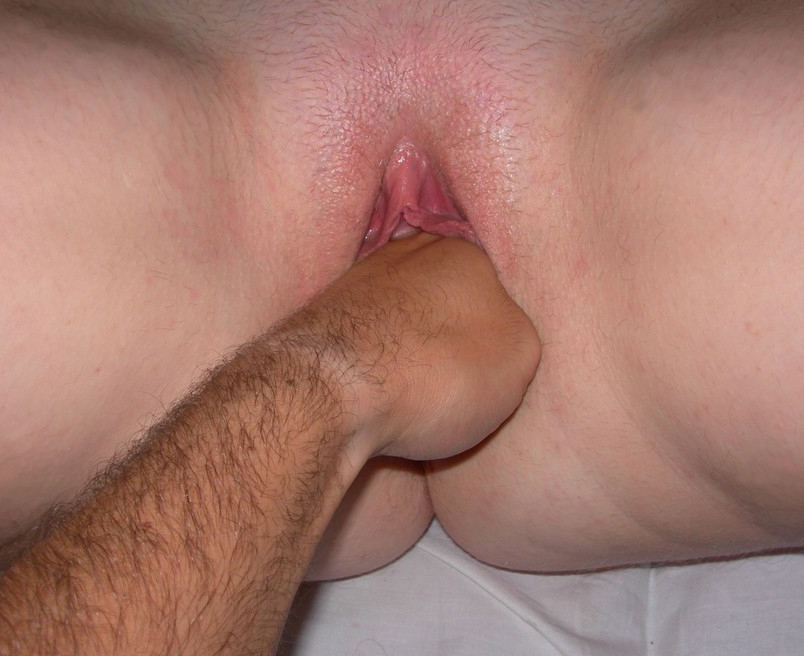
  A vagina getting fisted
- Forced orgasm: Where a subject has no control in being brought to orgasm, either through physical or mental restraint. May also be used where someone is continuously brought to orgasm to the point of it becoming painful, uncomfortable, or numb, rather than being pleasurable.
- Free use: An arrangement in which consent is assumed to be given for sexual and/or kink activities. There may still be limits on what activities consent can be assumed for, and which people consent can be assumed for.
- Freely Given, Reversible, Informed, Enthusiastic, Specific (FRIES): A consent model used in sex education to teach consent in general and the kinky community as a guideline, "Freely Given" refers to consent given without coersion or pressure, "Reversible" also standing for "Revokable" meaning consent can be withdrawn at any time for any reason, bringing an end to the activity. "Informed" means all participants understand what they are agreeing to, including possible health risks, effects such as marks and how long or short-term these effects may be. "Enthusiastic" refers to Enthusiastic consent, the person is certain and is making it known with clear communication. "Specific" They are consenting to what was discussed, consenting to giving oral sex does not mean consenting to being used roughly like a sex toy, and it doesn't mean consent for all oral sex can be assumed in the future unless that was discussed.
- Genitorture: Torture of the genitals. This is may include Cbt, prolonged orgasm, repeated orgasms and many more.
- Golden showers: Urinating on, or being urinated on by, another person.
- Good pain/Bad pain *Good pain* – The kind of pain in that feels exciting, arousing, or satisfying (like a sting, thud, or stretch). It’s intense but enjoyable. *Bad pain* – Pain that feels wrong, unsafe, or harmful (like sharp injury pain, burning, or joint damage). It signals danger and means play should stop.
- Gorean: A lifestyle based on the fictional slavery practice outlined in John Norman novels. The dynamic is typically male-dominant and female-submissive ("kajira"). It is generally seen as distinct from the BDSM community at large.
- Gunplay: The practice of including actual or simulated firearms into a scene.
- Handkerchief code: "Hanky Code" for short, A code used to indicate to others one's area of interest in a sexual context, ex: a Handkerchief worn on the left indicates a top, on the right indicates a bottom; generally used in an LGBTQ+ context, different colours and patterns indicate what kind of sexual activity one is looking for, such as Black for S&M.
- Hard limits: What someone absolutely will not do; non-negotiable (as opposed to "soft limits").
- Hogtie: Tying up a submissive's wrists and ankles, fastening them together behind their back using physical restraints, such as rope or cuffs.

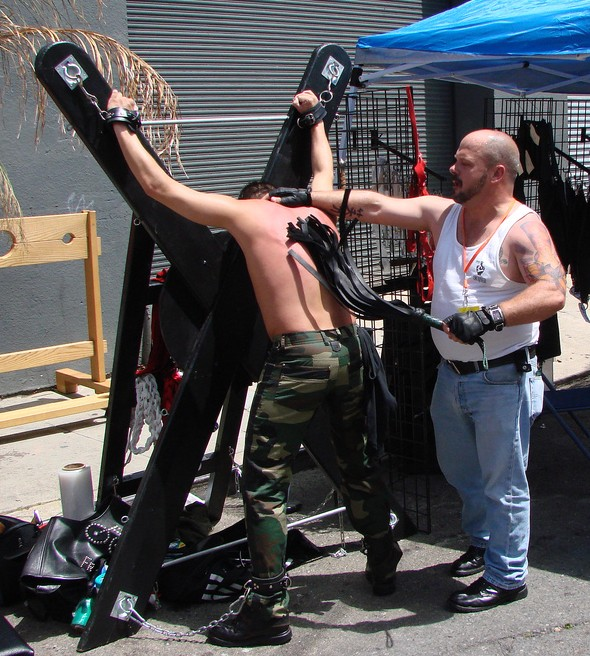
Flogging at the Up Your Alley Fair, San Francisco, 2006

- Impact play: Part of sensation play, dealing with impacts from whips, riding crops, paddles, floggers, etc.
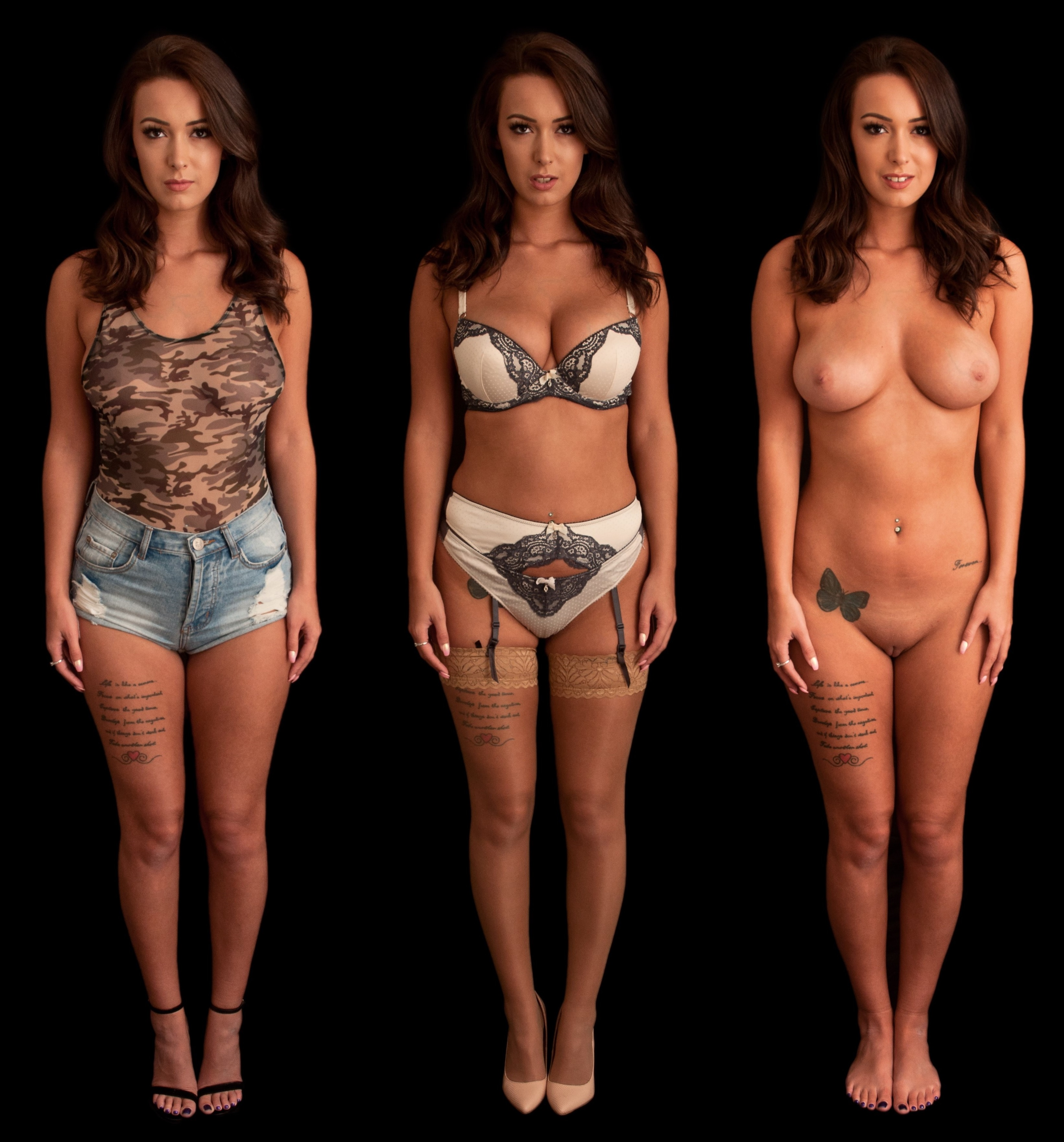
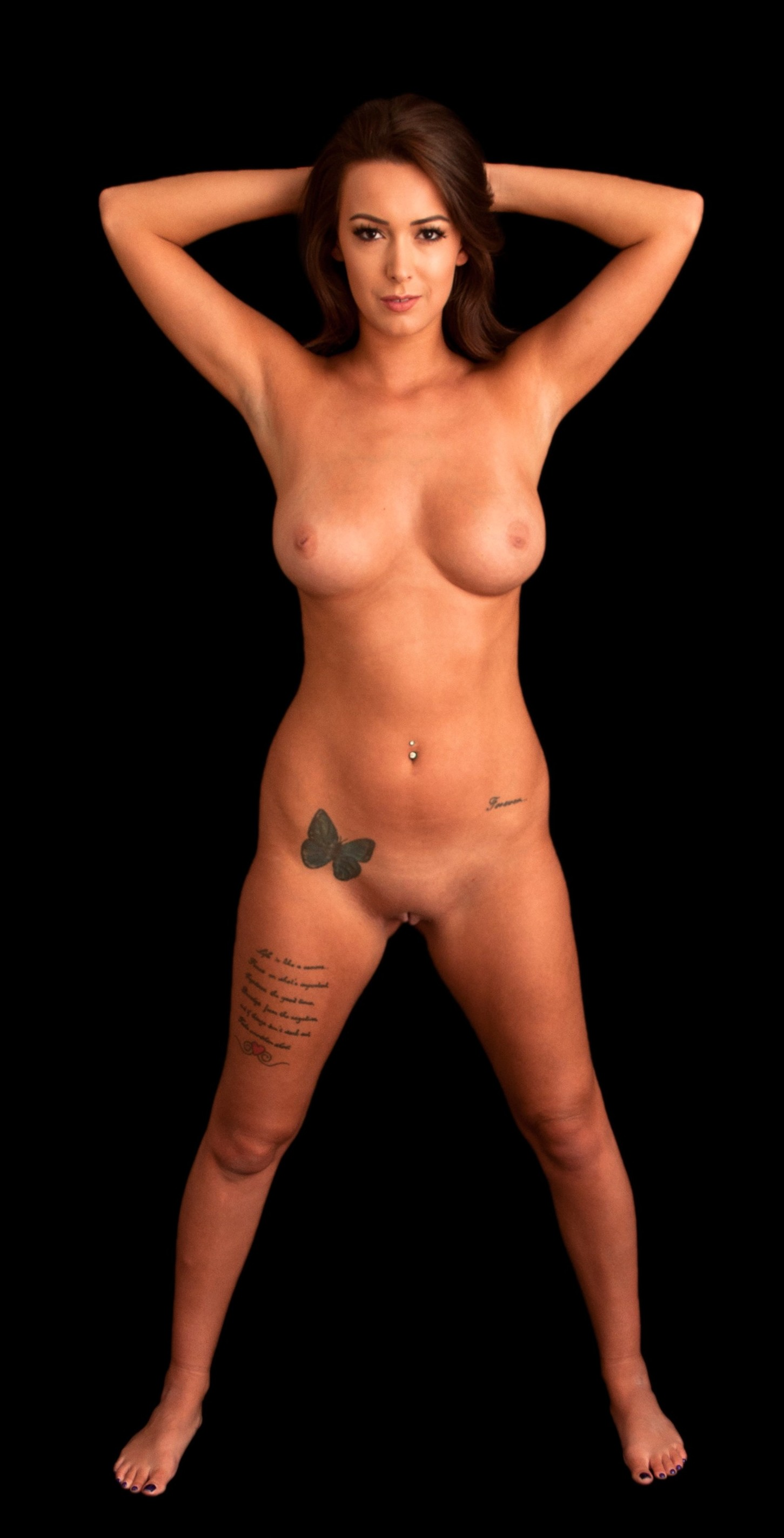
A submissive female, strips off her clothes (at the command of her master), while maintaining "Attention" pose (left). The same female in "Inspection" pose - used when the Master/prospective Master has to inspect a nude slave's body (right).
- Inspection: A form of scenario play, usually in a Master/slave-like relationship, where a submissive has to strip naked at the command of a dominant and adopt a pose to have their body, posture, grooming, and appearance inspected. They may also have the execution of other duties examined during this time. During an inspection, areas of their body and their state may be examined. After an inspection, a sub may be rewarded for passing or punished for failing. Inspections may also be performed for eroticism or objectification, either in private or in view of others.
- Kinbaku (Shibari): Literally means "tight binding.". Kinbaku is a Japanese style of bondage which combines elegant simplicity and intricate patterns into Kinbaku-bi ("beauty of tight binding."). This form of bondage may also restrict movement of the submissive individual.
- Kinky sex: Any sexual act that is generally considered to be unconventional.
- Klismaphilia: See enema play.
- Knife play: Slow, methodical sensation of the bottom with the edges and points of knives, usually without cutting the skin. Fear of the weapon plays a large part in the stimulus of the bottom.
- Limits: What someone will not participate in (hard limits) or is hesitant to do so (soft limits).
- Masochism: Act of receiving pleasure from acts involving the receipt or infliction of pain or humiliation.
- Masochist: Person who enjoys pain, often sexually.
- Master/slave: A consensual relationship where people enter a D/s dynamic with a focus on service and obedience. This may be part of a 24/7 lifestyle and/or multiple scenes. A collaring ceremony may be performed where a Master symbolically or literally places a collar on the slave to establish "ownership", often around the neck or wrists/ankles. This type of collar often differs from a scene-specific restraint and may be worn 24/7 or only during scenes. Non-gendered terms such as "Mx" can be used .
- MDLB: Mommy Domme/Little Boy, the female-led version of DDLG, a subset of Dominance and submission. While this lifestyle may or may not involve ageplay, the name refers to the nurturing relationship of parent/child.
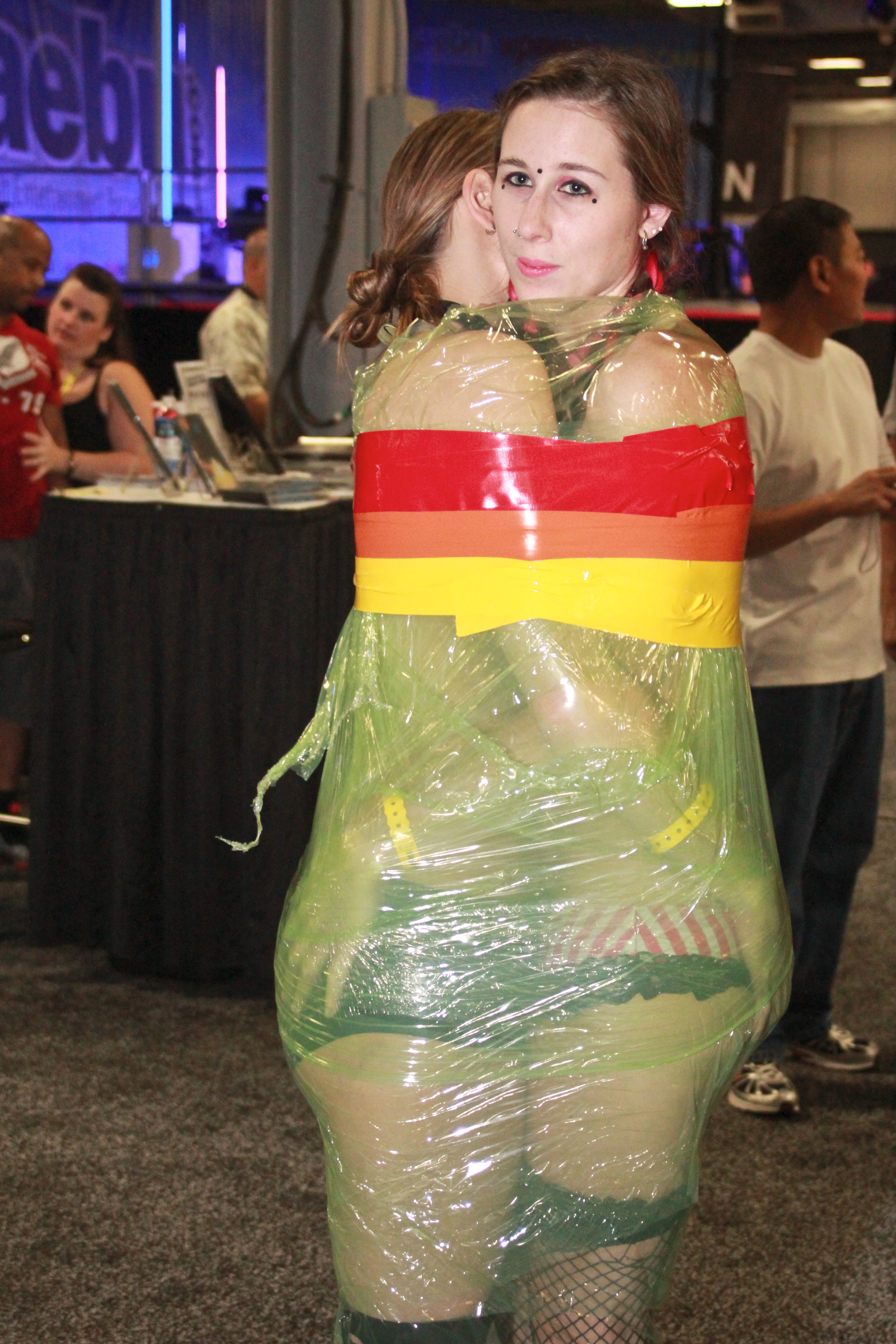
- Two women mummified with pallet wrap and duct tape, restraining their entire bodies, at Exxxotica 2013
  Mummification: Full body bondage that completely immobilizes the one wrapped up.
- Munch: A non-sexual BDSM meetup at a "vanilla" location with appropriate attire. Munches are typically networking, education and community events rather than for "cruising".
- Needle play: Piercings done with sterile needles of varying gauges, usually only for the duration of a scene. The upper back, buttocks and thighs are popular locations for needles. This type of scene is rarely available at public events due to medical risks associated with blood.
- Non-sexual kink: Kink activities without an explicit sexual aspect or intention.
- Nose torture: A traditionally Japanese form of BDSM often involving nose hooks.
- Pain play: See § Impact play.
- Pain slut: A person who enjoys receiving a heavy degree of pain.
- Pegging: A sexual practice in which one penetrates someone's anus with a strap-on dildo. Typically a heterosexual activity preformed by a dominant woman on a submissive man.
- Play party: A BDSM event involving many people engaging in scenes. Generally, there is are dedicated areas for socializing, changing into fetishwear, and BDSM/sexual activities.

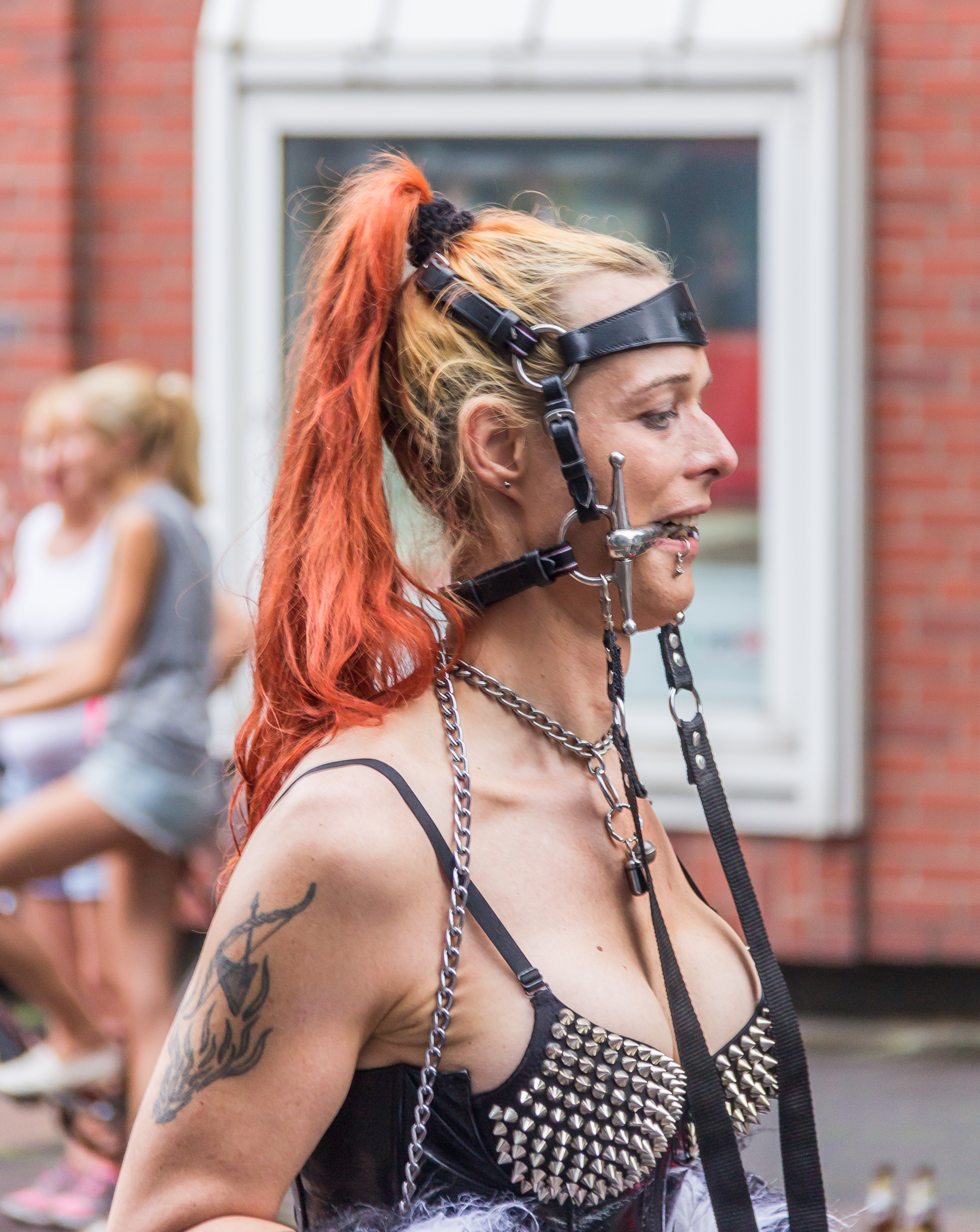
Animal roleplay at Cologne Pride, 2014

- Ponyboy or Ponygirl: A sub dressed in a pony outfit, with mouth bit and anal plug with a tail. They are told to prance or behave like a pony.
- Post-orgasm torture: Uncomfortable or painful stimulation of the genitals immediately after orgasm, when these are in a more sensitive state.
- Personal Responsibility, Informed, Consensual Kink: (PRICK): A framework that emphasizes shared responsibility for understanding and communicating risks. Combines aspects of SSC and RACK to address criticisms of each.
- Pro Dom: Male professional dominant who exchanges money or goods for BDSM services.
- ProDomme: Female professional dominant (charges money).
- Pup-play / Puppy Play: Play where the sub acts like a puppy.
- Pussy torture: Torture of the vulva or vagina for sexual gratification.
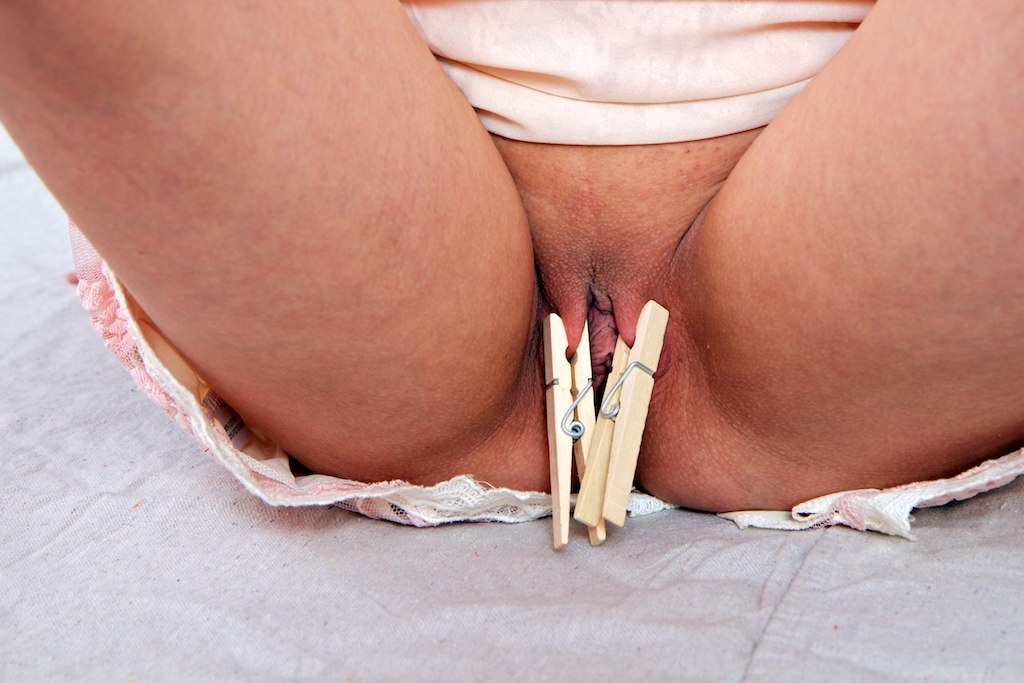
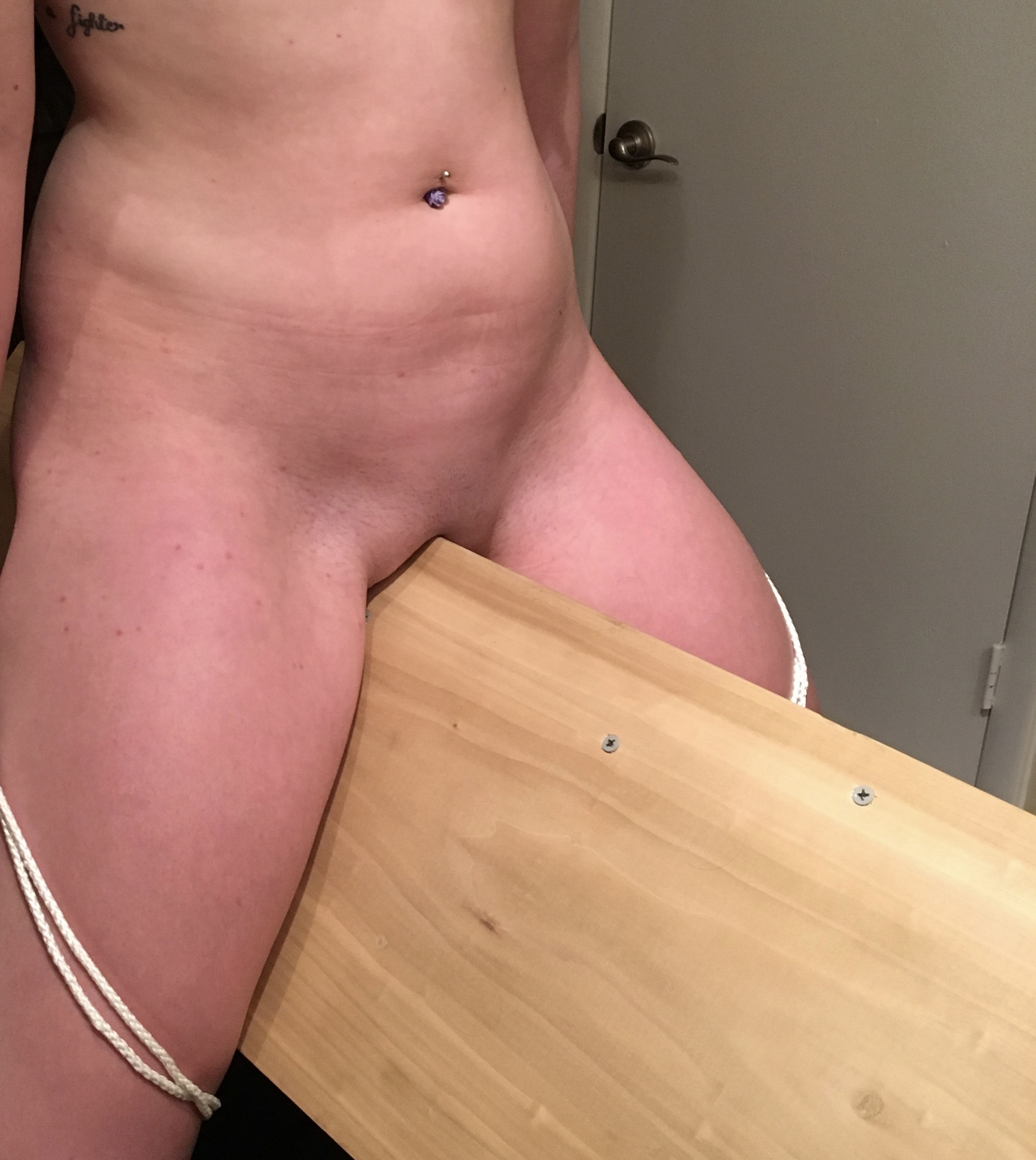
  Left: Pussy torture by clothespins used as clamps on labia. Right: Pussy torture by wooden horse
- Risk Aware Consensual Kink (RACK): Describes a philosophical perspective within the BDSM community that prioritizes informed consent and awareness of the risks involved in BDSM activities. Unlike Safe, sane and consensual, a perspective with a focus on ensuring activities are inherently "safe," RACK emphasizes the importance of all participants being fully educated about the risks they are taking.
- Rhaphanidosis: Insertion of a piece of radish into the anus.

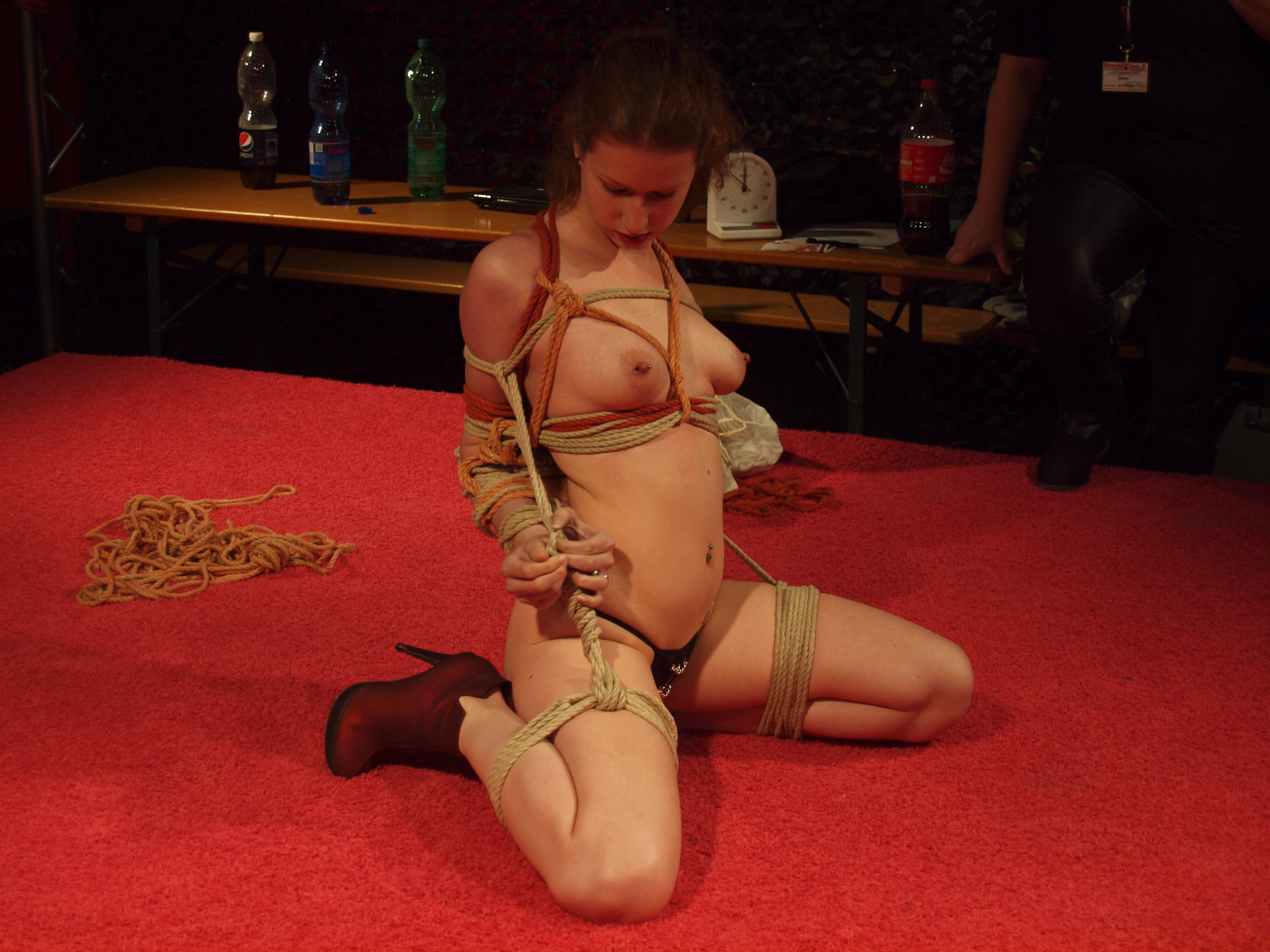
Rope bondage in an uncomfortable bondage position at BoundCon, 2013

- Rope bondage: The act of tying up or binding a person with rope. Can be casual "Western style" or structured such as in Japanese Kinbaku.
- Rope Dojo: A dedicated space for rope play. They are used to host rope-related events.
- Ruination: Bringing someone to the edge of orgasm and preventing climax. See also Edging (sexual practice) and Forced orgasm.
- Sadism: The act of receiving pleasure from inflicting pain.
- Sadist: A person who enjoys inflicting pain, usually sexually.
- Safe, Sane and Consensual (SSC): A guideline, used by some in the BDSM community, that emphasizes ensuring that activities are safe, all participants have capacity to give consent, and explicit consent is obtained from all parties involved. This approach is sometimes contrasted with RACK (Risk-Aware Consensual Kink), which emphasizes informed risk-taking over predetermined notions of safety.
- Safeword: A mutually agreed upon word, phrase or gesture that can be used at any time to communicate the need for reduced intensity, a break or an immediate stop. Common safewords include "Yellow" to slow down/reduce intensity, and "Red" or "Safeword" to immediately stop. If the bottom is unable to communicate verbally, a gesture such as making a fist or raising/dropping an arm can be used for the same purpose. Scenes involving consensual non-consent or blanket consent do not void the need for a safeword, as the submissive may wish to exit the scene regardless. In situations like this, a "fake safeword" may be employed, for the sensation of being ignored while maintaining the actual ability to end the scene.
- Scat play: Feces play.
- Scene: Refers to the setting and participation of a BDSM activity.
- Sensation play: class of activities meant to impart physical sensations upon a partner, as opposed to mental forms of erotic play such as power exchange or sexual roleplaying. Sensation play is meant to stimulate an area of the body for the submissive partner to experience pleasure or pain.
- Service submission: A person who enjoys performing a service in a sexual or BDSM environment.
- Slave: A submissive who consensually gives up total control of one or more aspects of their life to another person (their Master).
- Soft limit: Something that someone is hesitant to do or is nervous to try. They can sometimes be talked into the activity, but it is preferable if it is negotiated into a scene at a trial stage or at beginner level.
- Squick feeling: Discomfort with certain kinky activities. It can also refer to someone who has no interest in the activity – it "squicks them out" – but who has no prejudice against the play or people who participate. It is believed that the word is a combination of "squirm" and "icky" and is used to imply an uncomfortable feeling mixed with disgust. The term is used instead of disgust because that word implies moral repugnance to the act.
- Sub drop: A strong physical and emotional response experienced by a participant in a BDSM scene. This can last for minutes, hours or days and include flu-like symptoms and strong emotions such as shame. Tops can also experience drop after a scene. Drop can be somewhat mitigated but not fully prevented by aftercare, including warmth, chocolate, quiet, darkness, cuddling and food/water.
- Submissive (or "sub" for short): A person that gives up control, either all the time or for a specified period (not to be confused with "bottom" or "slave").
- Subspace: A psychological state caused by excitement and sense of "letting go" of control during a scene. Typically experienced by submissives, s-types, or bottoms during a BDSM scene. It is often described as a "natural high" where the individual feels disconnected from time, space, and their body. Tops must monitor their partner's well-being during a scene since they may not be able to communicate their needs. Can be succeeded by sub drop.
- Switch: A person who is contextually dominant and submissive during the same or separate scenes. Depending on preference, this could depend on their partner's gender identity or type of BDSM play.
- Tit torture: The act of causing deliberate physical pain to the breasts or nipples.
- TNG: The Next Generation. A tag commonly used by groups and organizations which cater to younger people involved in BDSM, typically ages 18–35.
- Top: The person "doing the action" (contrasted with bottom – the person receiving the action). A top is not necessarily dominant in the scene.
- Topping from the bottom: Derogatory term for an attempt to direct the top/dominant during a scene in a way not otherwise agreed upon. Bratting is an exception to this.
- TPE (Total Power Exchange): A relationship where the dominant or owner has complete authority and influence over the submissive's life, making decisions for and commanding the submissive over any and all matters and activities, to which the submissive must comply.
- Training: Either referring to a short period of time, or an ongoing effort of the dominant teaching the submissive how to behave for their own preferences.
- Vanilla: Someone who is not into BDSM. Alternatively, sexual behavior which does not encompass BDSM activity.

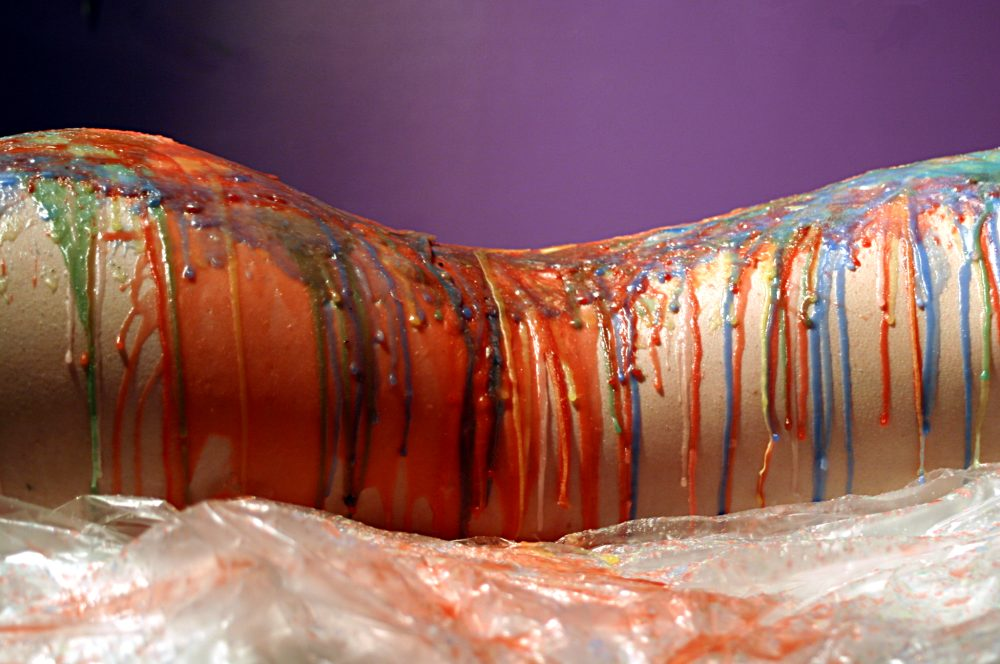
Wax in a colorful pattern on the back of a subject

- Wax play: The top drips hot wax on the bottom.
- WIITWD: What It Is That We Do. A broad term referring to all forms of alternative sexuality.

== See also ==
- Bondage positions and methods
- List of BDSM equipment
- Outline of BDSM
