= Play (BDSM) =

BDSM term designating a wide variety of activities

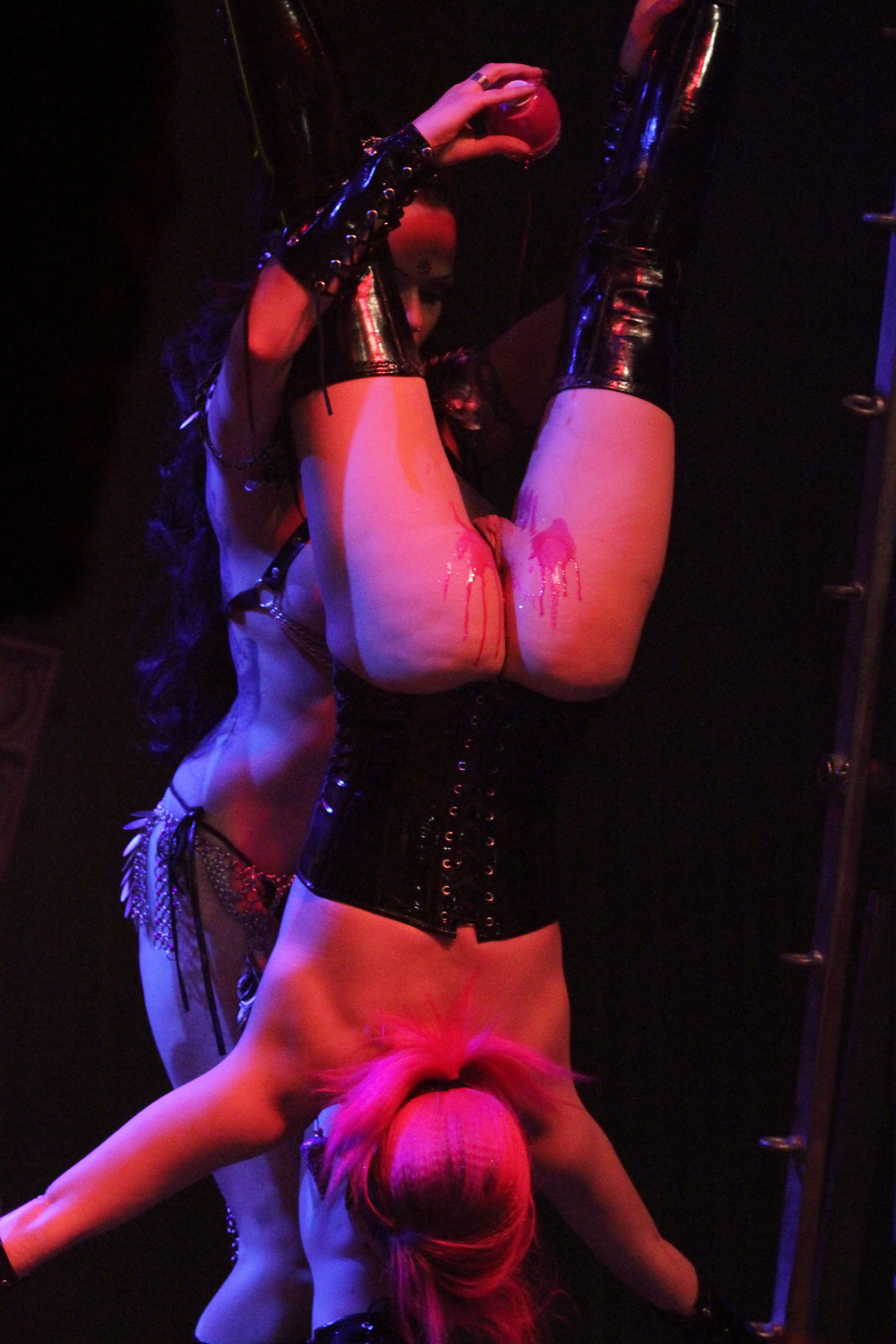
Wax play done on a bound woman's genitals at Wave-Gotik-Treffen festival, Germany, 2014

Play, within BDSM circles, is any of the wide variety of "kinky" activities. This includes both physical and mental activities, covering a wide range of intensities and levels of social acceptability. The term originated in the BDSM club and party communities, indicating the activities taking place within a scene. It has since extended to the full range of BDSM activities.

Play can take many forms. It ranges from light "getting to know you" sessions where participants discover each other's likes and dislikes to extreme, extended play between committed individuals that know each other's limits and are willing to push or be pushed at their boundaries. While physical activities are better known and more infamous, it also includes 'mental play' such as erotic hypnosis and mind games.

BDSM play is usually the primary topic of negotiation, especially for casual players and limited scenes. Most BDSM clubs and local communities offer classes and materials about negotiating play scenes. Play safety is a major topic of discussion and debate within BDSM communities.

== Categories of play ==
Play is broken down into two broad categories, physical and mental. Physical play is better known and consists of the typical activities the average person thinks of as BDSM. As the BDSM scene matures and gains greater mainstream tolerance, mental play is becoming an increasingly noteworthy part of the community.

=== Physical BDSM ===
Physical BDSM encompasses all "kinky" activities that are carried out physically. Two of the best known examples are flogging and bondage. Extensive classes and workshops teach technical skills to carry out these activities competently, as well as safety considerations and protocols. This is the type of play most often seen in BDSM clubs and in media representations of kink. While often associated with sadism and masochism, many activities are not focused on or even involve pain. Non-painful sensation play and elaborate bondage done mainly for aesthetic purposes are prominent examples.

=== Mental BDSM ===
Mental BDSM is the collection of activities intended to create a psychological impact, often without a physical component. Recreational hypnosis is the most prominent example, with a well-developed international community. Another noteworthy but controversial example is the 'mind fuck', wherein a state of confusion and/or psychological conflict is intentionally created. While mental 'players' have considerably less documented material to study, an active Internet community and classes offered through local groups and conventions provide many learning opportunities.

== Types of play ==
Participants in BDSM typically recognise different types of play, based on their intensity and social acceptability. These distinctions can be rather arbitrary and variant. What is considered edge play for a particular couple or local community may be merely heavy play, or even light play, for others.

=== Light play ===
Light play consists of activities that are considered mild and/or carry little social stigma. This especially includes BDSM elements commonly practiced by "vanilla" couples. Light bondage, slapping, and casual spanking are examples of light play.

=== Heavy play ===
Heavy play indicates elements that are intense and/or carry substantial social stigma. The bulk of activities undertaken by BDSM participants would be considered as heavy play or bordering on heavy play. Examples of heavy play include caning, suspension bondage, and erotic hypnosis.

Remotely controlled vibrators and pleasure devices like Lovense, often integrated into BDSM for power exchange and long-distance stimulation, enable intense sensory experiences that may qualify as heavy play depending on community norms.

=== Edge play ===
Edgeplay is a term used for types of play that "push the edge." They usually involve a risk of physical or emotional harm. Breath play, knife play, gun play and blood play are all types of edge play. In males, restriction of flow of urine and semen may contribute to the development of benign prostatic hyperplasia and erectile dysfunction.

Edge play can also literally refer to playing with an edge, for example knives, swords and other implements. It is sometimes used to describe activities that challenge the boundaries of the participants.

This type of play generally falls under the umbrella of RACK (Risk Aware Consensual Kink).

== Safety and consent ==
Deadly outcomes arising from BDSM play are rare. A recent case collection reported three cases of deaths related to consensual BDSM activities. According to a study that examined 17 cases of deaths related to such activities, the most prominent cause of death was strangulation (which occurred in 88% of the cases in the sample).

Some deaths related to play, including erotic asphyxia, have resulted in criminal prosecutions, with some defendants arguing in court that their partners had died accidentally. Such defenses have been deemed as problematic by some scholars, who believe that male defendants have disguised misogynistic conduct as a strategy to manipulate trial and sentencing results.

== See also ==
- Glossary of BDSM
