= Female submission =

Sexual activities with a female submissive partner

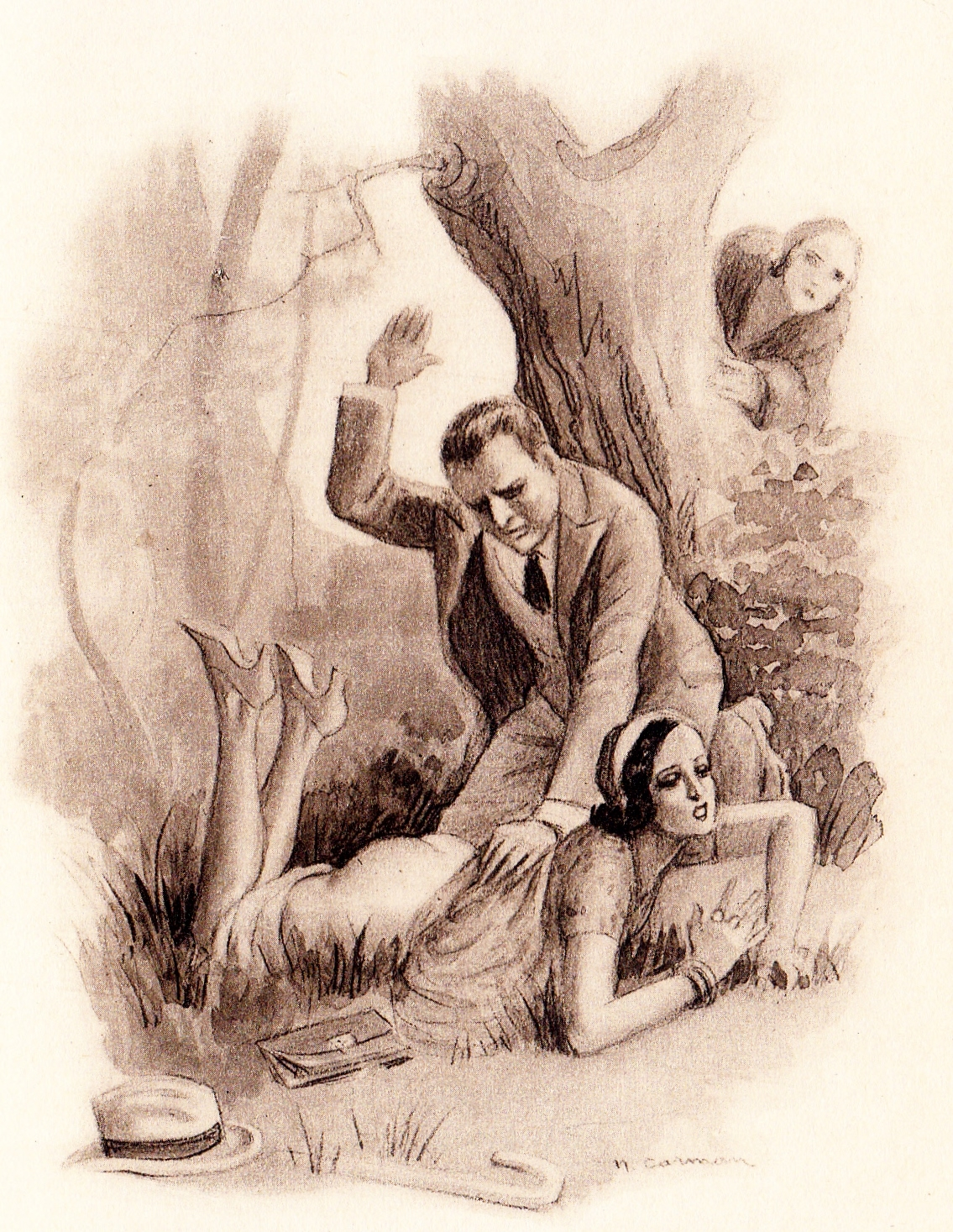
A submissive woman being spanked on her bare buttocks by a dominant man. Illustration by N. Carman (1931)

Female submission or femsub is an activity or relationship in which a woman submits to the direction of a sexual partner or has her body used sexually by or for the sexual pleasure of her partner. The expression is often associated with BDSM, where submission to such activity is usually voluntarily and consensual. Consensual submission usually involves a degree of trust by the woman in her partner. The dominant partner can be one person or there can be multiple dominant partners simultaneously. The submissive woman may derive sexual pleasure or emotional gratification from relinquishing (to varying degrees) control to (as well as satisfying) a trusted dominant partner.

A 1985 study suggested that about 30% of participants in sadomasochistic activities were females. A 2015 study indicates that 61.7% of females who are active in BDSM expressed a preference for a submissive role, 25.7% consider themselves a switch, while 12.6% prefer the dominant role but a more recent survey from 2017 indicates that women tend to self-identify as Submissive, Slave, Bottom, or Masochist (SSBM) and always perform submissive roles while men tend to self-identify as Dominant, Master, Top, or Sadist (DMTS) and always perform dominant roles.

== Eroticism ==
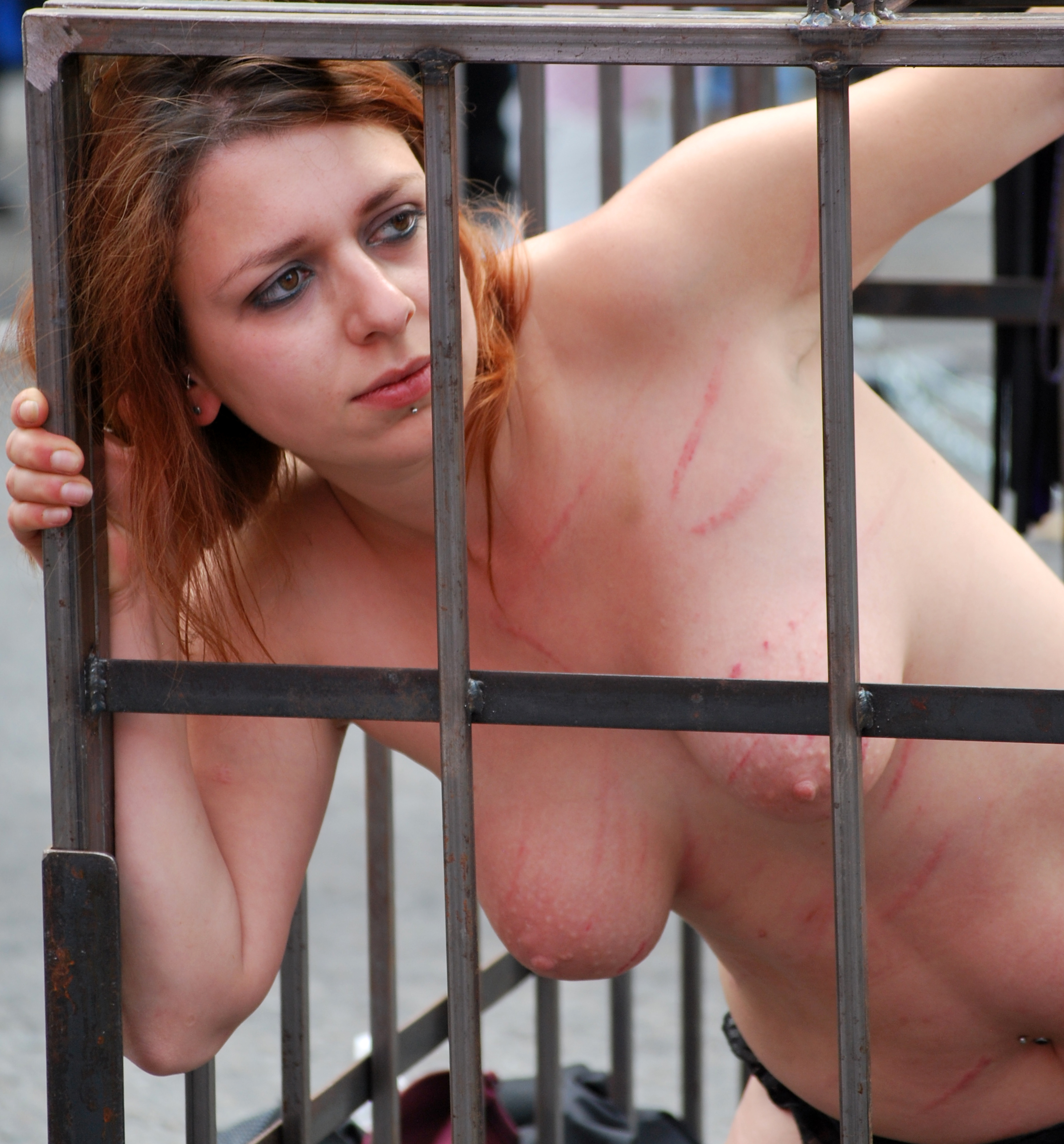
A woman is caged at the Folsom Street Fair in the U.S.. She is being publicly humiliated by being in an almost naked state with her bare breasts on display and visible cane markings on her body including her breasts.

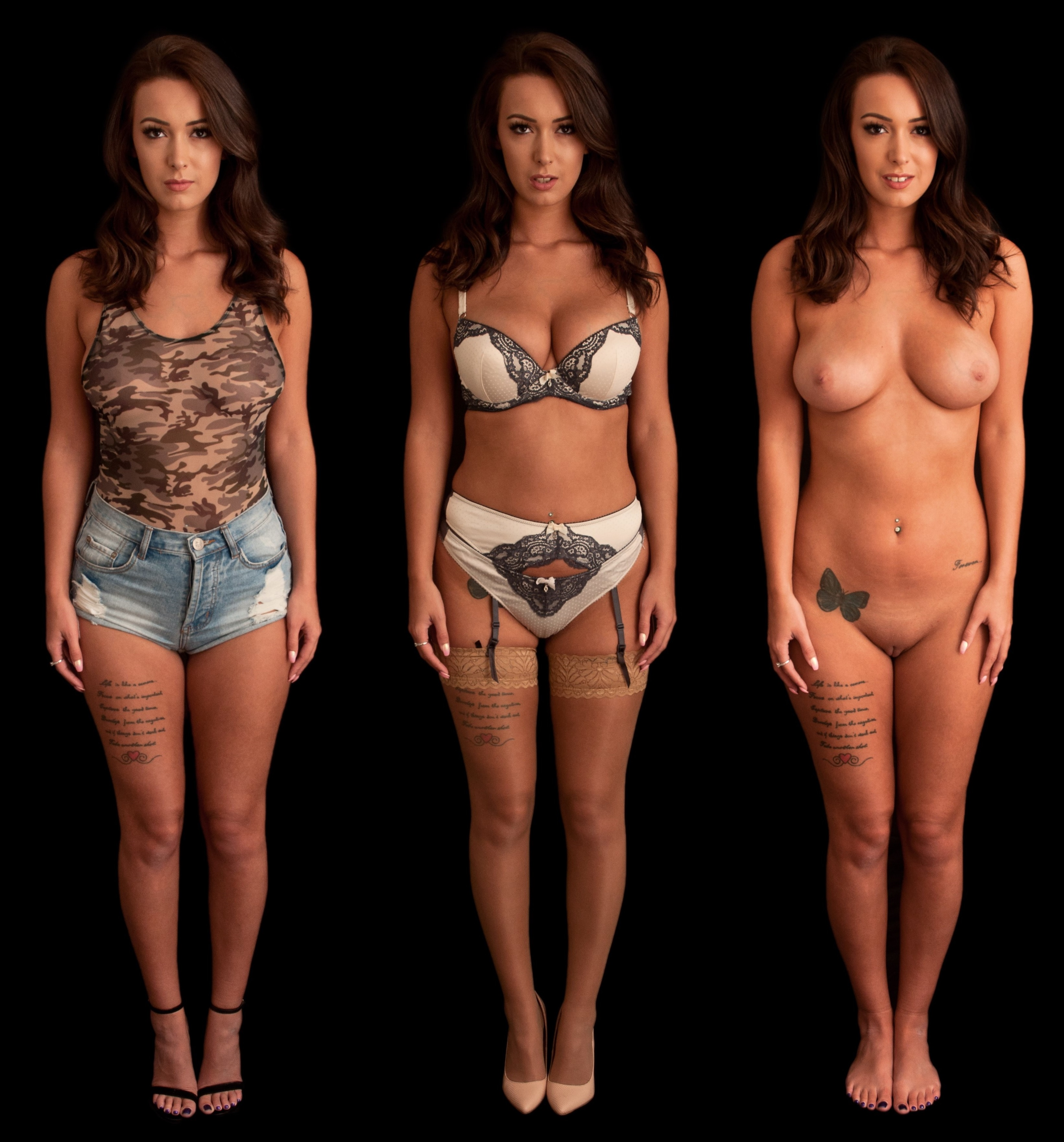
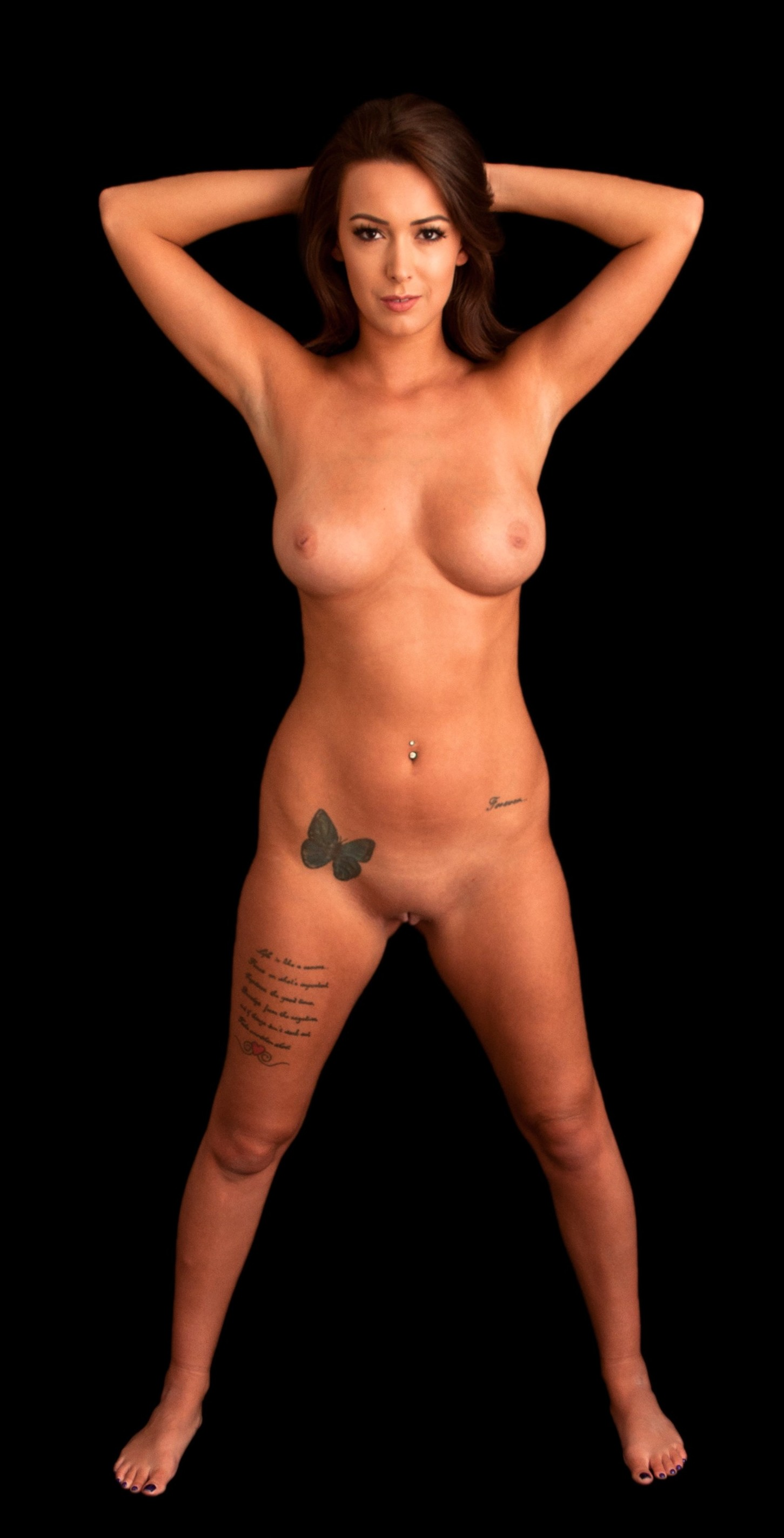
A submissive female, strips off her clothes (at the command of her master), while maintaining "Attention" pose (left). The same female in "Inspection" pose - used when the Master/prospective Master has to inspect a nude slave's body (right).

Submission can take the form of passivity or obedience in relation to any aspect of conduct and behavior. Submission can be to a partner in an interpersonal relationship, such as allowing the sex partner to initiate all sexual activity as well as setting the time and place and sex position. It can also be in relation to the type of sexual activity that the partners will engage in, including non-coital sex such as anal sex, or BDSM or sexual roleplay.

Some sex acts require a woman to be passive while an active sex partner performs sex acts on her, and this may be seen as a form of submission. Obedience may be a part of a sexual roleplay or activity, and can also be in the relation to the style of dress, if any, or behavior or any other manner. In fact, any act that is performed on a passive woman, such as undressing her, may be regarded as submissive behavior on the part of the woman.

Submission may be manifested in a multitude of ways whereby a woman relinquishes sexual or personal control to another, such as acts of servitude, submission to humiliation or punishments such as erotic spanking, hair pulling, caning and whipping, forced orgasms and female ejaculations, orgasm denial, golden showers, pussy torture, "forced" chastity, wax play, spitting, or other activities, at times in association with bondage.

Female submission can take the form of engaging in sexual activity with a person other than her normal partner, as in the case of swinging (sometimes called wife swapping), non-monogamy or prostitution. Female submission can also take place in the form of clothed male, naked female. The level and type of submission can vary from person to person, and from one time to another. Some women choose to include occasional sexual submission in an otherwise conventional sex life. For example, a woman may adopt a submissive role during a sexual activity to overcome a sexual inhibition she may have. A woman may choose to submit full-time, becoming a lifestyle slave.

Many people derive erotic pleasure from the submissiveness of a female partner, which they may regard as a turn-on; and some people regard obvious passivity as a form of feminine flirting or seduction. Some women submit to the sexual wishes of their partner for the pleasure of the partner, which may itself result in sexual pleasure for the submissive woman. In other cases the submission is solely for the pleasure of the partner where the woman does not receive pleasure as such from the activity.

== In literature ==
Female submission is common in traditional literature. Story of O, published in 1954 in French, is an erotic tale of female submission involving a beautiful Parisian fashion photographer named O, who is taught to be constantly available for all forms of sex, offering herself to any male.

Wonder Woman's origin is closely tied to the world of BDSM and feminism. Its creator William Moulton Marston, a practicing psychologist, did not view female submission as an act of weakness or defeat. He used to see it as an act of love and respect.

== See also ==
- Breast torture
- Cuckquean
- Dominance and submission
- Dominatrix
- Female-led relationship
- Fifty Shades of Grey
- Fisting
- Gorean subculture
- Male dominance
- Male submission
- Nyotaimori
- Top, bottom, switch
