= Sensation play =

Erotic activities meant to impart physical sensations

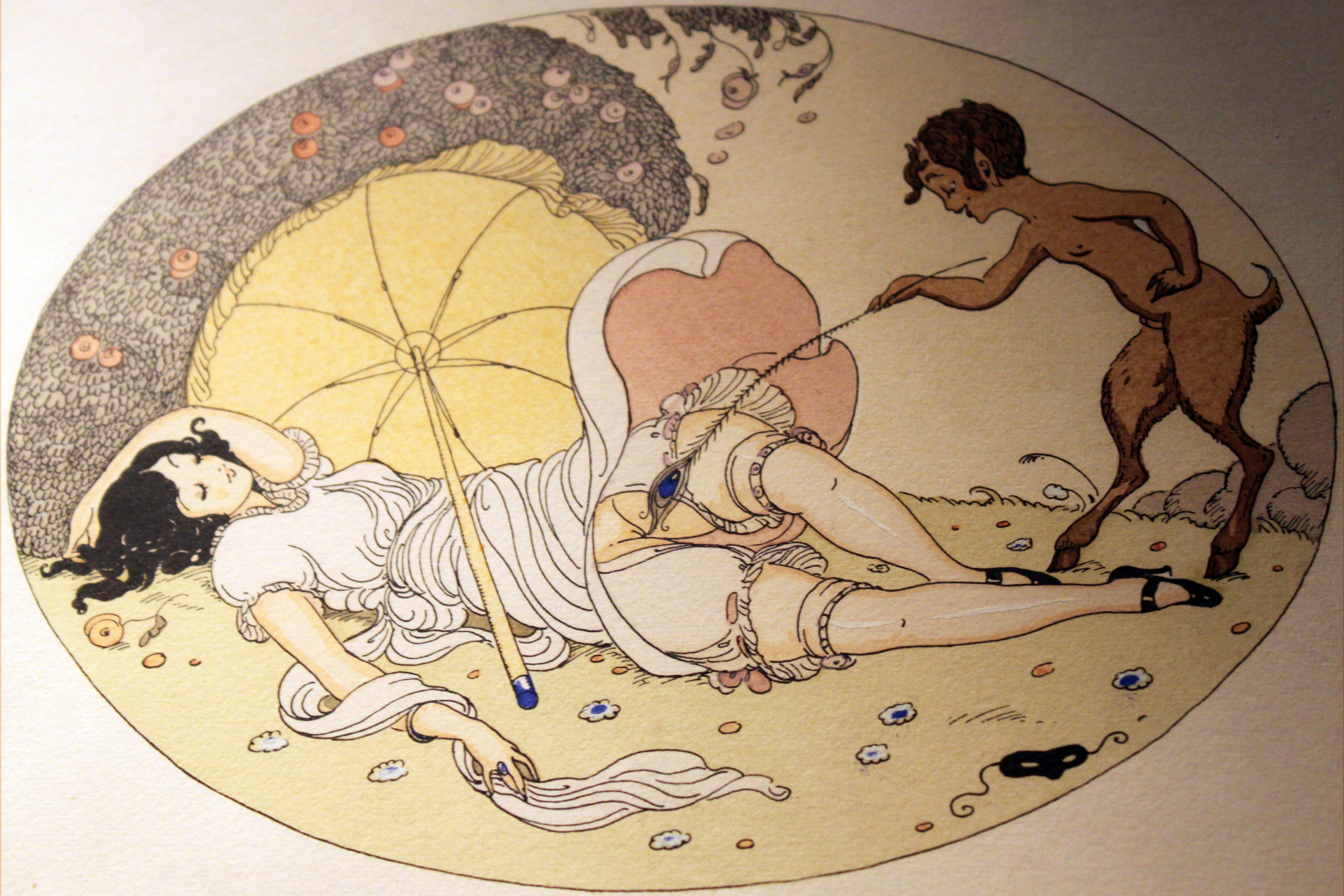
Feather tickling can intensify a sexual feeling.

Sensation play, also known as sensual play or sensory play, is an act where senses are engaged in various ways to heighten erotic pleasure and induce sensuality. As an activity, it is meant to impart pleasurable and arousing sensations upon a partner, usually during an intimate interaction.

As opposed to mental forms of erotic play such as power exchange or sexual roleplaying, a sensual play is generally pleasing and light, that deliberately engages the five senses to explore pleasure, thereby leading to intense sexual arousal or orgasm.

Sensation play can be an umbrella term, with the harsher "pain play" and gentler "general sensory play" being subtypes, where an individual may prefer one or the other.

== Types ==
=== General sensory play ===
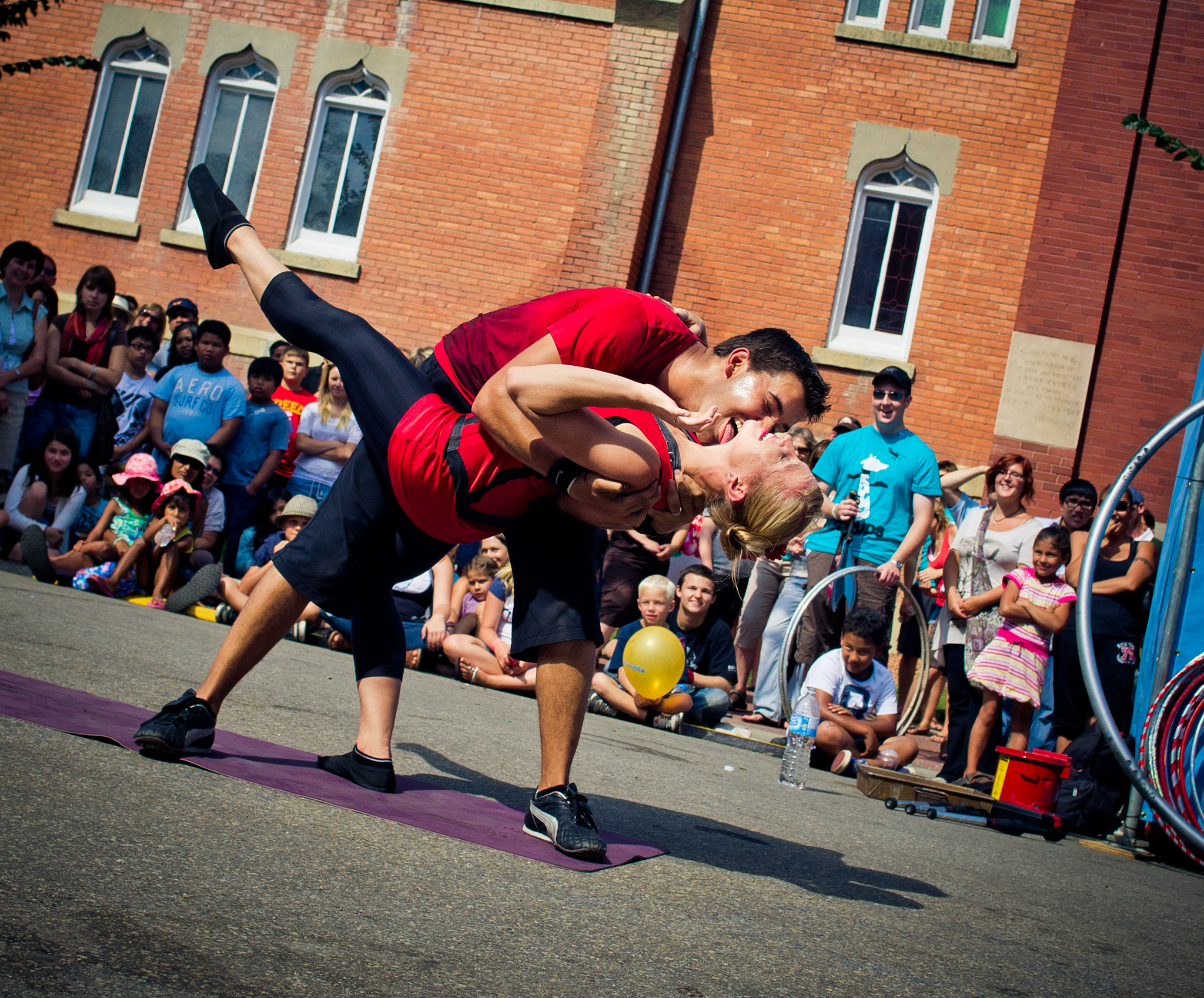
Neck licking is a form of light sensual play.

Many couples that would not consider themselves active in BDSM are familiar with sensual play: the use of silk scarves, feathers, blindfolding, tickling, erotic music, ice, massage oils, soft spanking, and other similar implements. The sensation can come from just about anywhere, provided that the implement falls within the negotiated terms of the interaction or relationship. Sensation play is meant to give arousing sensations to a partner's body. It is limited only by one's own imagination and a lot of variation can occur from one play scene to the next.

Unlike BDSM, sensual play is soft and, according to Dr Celina Criss, "Pain never needs to be involved in sensual sensory play...Think gentle touches, delicious flavors, delightful scents, different kinds of light, and beautiful soundtracks. The clothes we wear and the settings we create can be a big part of this sort of play." Other examples in sensual play include hand holding, talking dirty, a person's fingers running through their hair, and as well as the partner's scent, which can emphasize sexual arousal.

=== BDSM ===
Sensation play in BDSM can also involve sadomasochistic play or "pain play", involving the application of carefully controlled stimuli to the human body so that it reacts as if it were actually hurt. While this can involve the infliction of actual pain, it is usually done in order to release pleasurable endorphins, creating a sensation somewhat like runner's high or the afterglow of orgasm. In BDSM play, the dom (or dominant) introduces and controls the sensation to the sub (or submissive).

Note that safety and consent are of paramount importance in the practice of more intense forms of sensation play. People engaging in such activities should adhere to the principles of "safe, sane and consensual" or of "risk-aware consensual kink".

== Examples ==
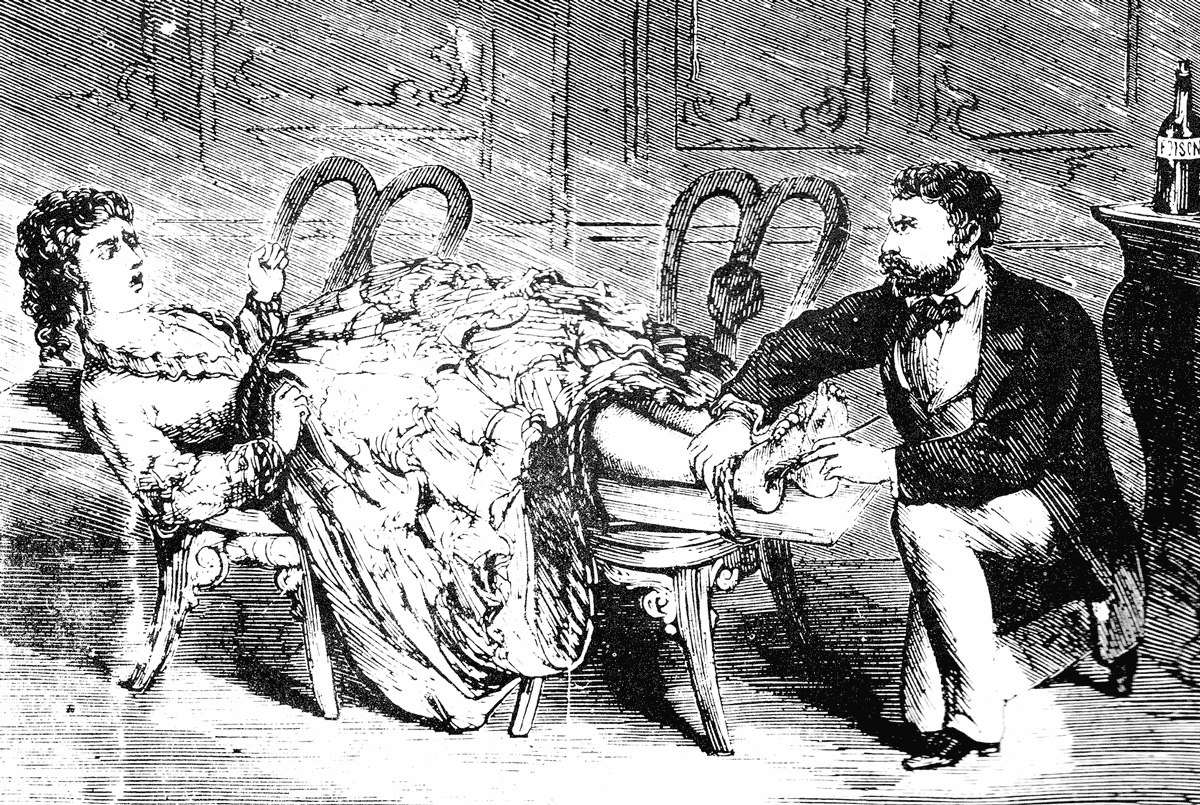
A woman tickled sensually (1869)

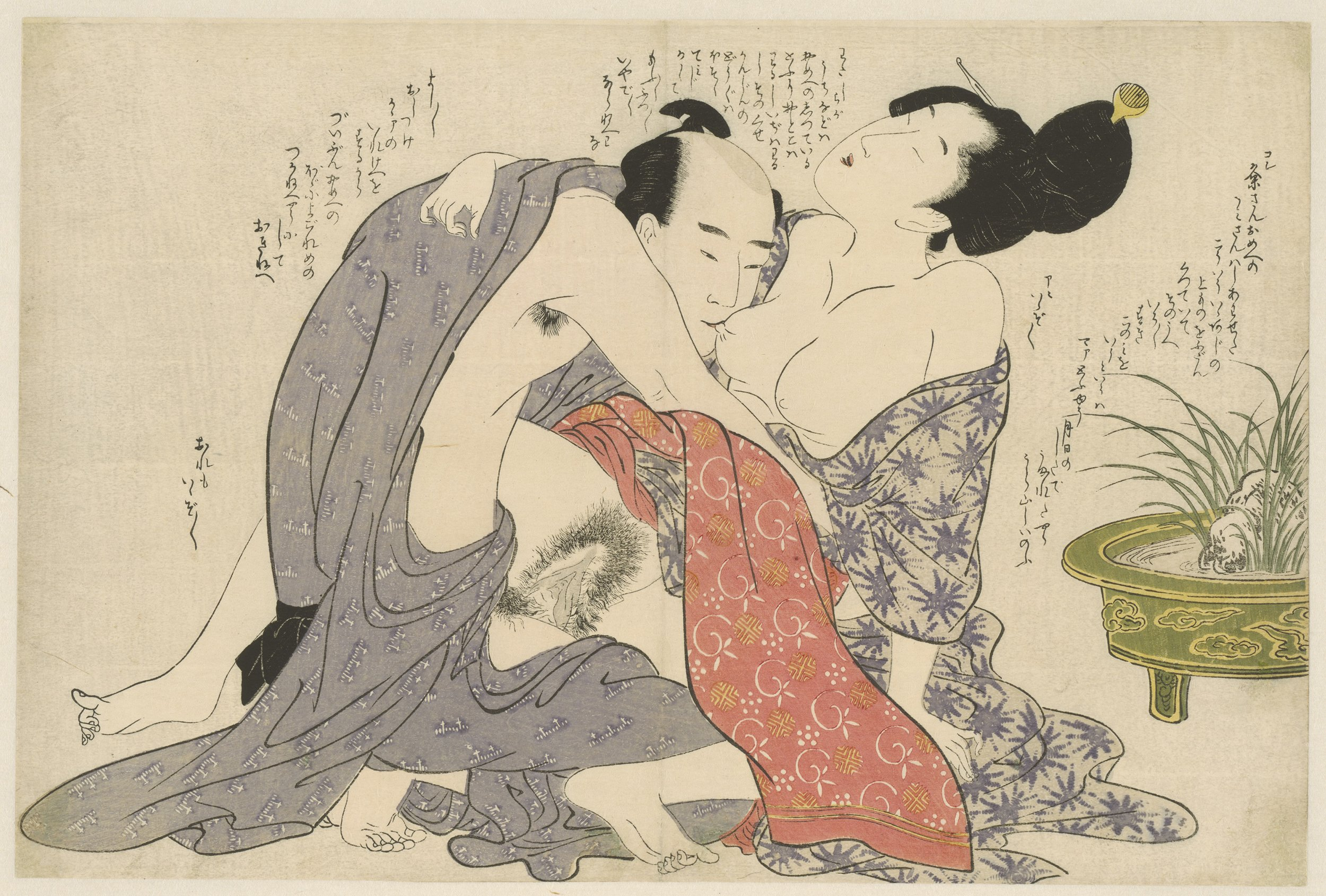
Nipple biting (1799)

Sensual play acts range from light to gentle, such as:

- Two partners exploring the sensations of kissing or other intimacy while blindfolded
- Unusual textures such as feathers, silk, or leather
- Erotic tickling
- Blowing or breathing on the skin
- Whispering in, or kissing, the ears
- Intimacy in a bathtub or spa
- Neck kissing, licking or nibbling

To more pain-inducing or hazardous interactions:

- Sensory deprivation such as mummification
- Contact with intense temperatures, such as ice or hot wax
- Biting and clawing
- Whips, flogging, bondage suspension and other BDSM related activities.
- Clamping parts of the body with clothespins, forceps, nipple clamps or similar devices.
- Other implements that may not normally be used in a sexual context, such as an electric toothbrush. These items may be referred to as pervertibles within the BDSM community.

== Sensuality in film ratings ==
The Motion Picture Association film rating system uses the descriptor "sensuality" for films that exhibit some erotically suggestive images or scenes. The usage of "sensuality" has been met with some criticism because audiences confuse it with "sexuality", another common descriptor in movie ratings. Laremy Legel of MTV.com argued that the Motion Picture Association's use of content descriptors could be ambiguous, citing the distinction between the PG-13 ratings assigned to The Devil Wears Prada (2006) for "some sensuality" and The Illusionist (2006) for "some sexuality" and violence. Legel contended that the difference between "sensuality" and "sexuality" was not clearly defined, making it difficult for parents to interpret the ratings.

According to MPA Film Ratings, however, "sensuality" refers to intimate behaviour or flirtation that does not rise to the level of "sexuality", such as kissing, embracing, or caressing, and may imply further sexual activity without depicting it.

== See also ==
- Glossary of BDSM
- Impact play
- Pain play
- Forced orgasm
