= Limits (BDSM) =

Agreed limits to erotic practices

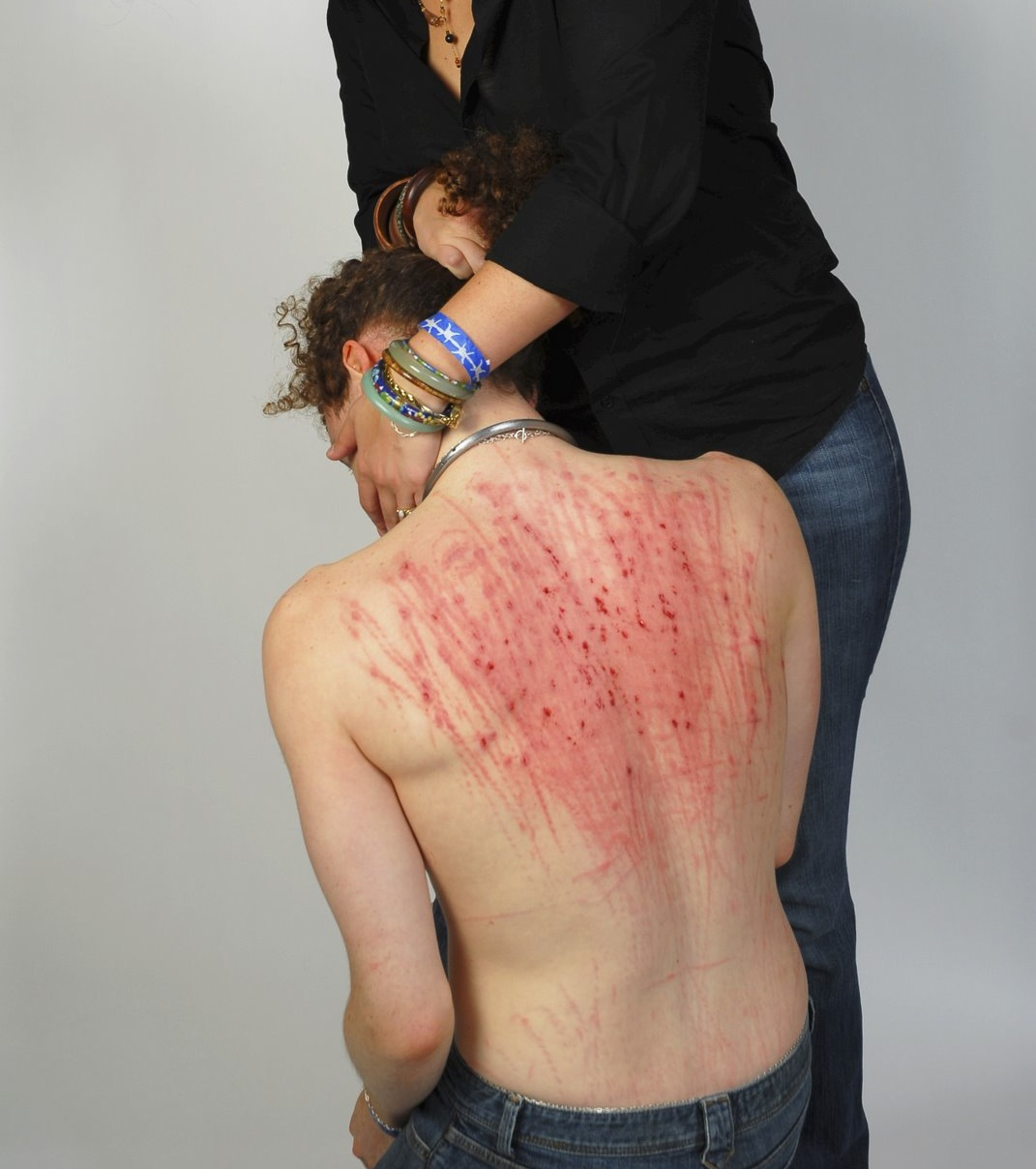
A submissive man is consoled by his mistress after she has made his back bloody through massive beating.

In BDSM, limits refer to issues that participants in a play scene or dynamic feel strongly about, usually referring to prohibited activities. Participants typically negotiate an outline of what activities will and will not take place. The participants describe what they desire, do not desire, will and will not tolerate, including the determination of limits. For example, it is common to set a safeword and to establish certain types of play as prohibited.

The BDSM usage of the terminology "limits" derives from the concept of "off limits", the idea of limiting a scene to a specific set of activities, and the limitations (in terms of interest, as well as physical and emotional tolerance) of the participants.

== Setting limits ==
Both dominants and submissives can set limits. Limits can be agreed to verbally or they can be incorporated into a formal contract. Sometimes the participants engage in a formal conversation about limits and boundaries; this is referred to as negotiation. Other couples discuss their likes and dislikes in a similar manner to "Vanilla" relationships.

=== "No limits" ===
Some partners choose not to set limits; however, this is uncommon and most likely to be seen in established relationships between committed partners. It may occur in total power exchange dynamics and can be considered a form of edgeplay. In wider kink and BDSM circles, especially in the context of casual play, “no limits” is commonly accepted to be an indication of an unsafe play partner.

== Types of limits ==
The terminology varies slightly across different local communities and Internet forums. However, there are general usages recognized across most BDSM populations.

=== Hard limit ===
A hard limit is something that must not be done. This is so because it is essentially something which makes the party in question very uncomfortable or something which would invoke a triggered response from them. Violating a set hard limit is often considered cause for ending a scene or even a relationship. Examples include “scat is a hard limit for me” or “I have a back injury, so striking on the back is a hard limit”.

=== Soft limit ===
A soft limit is something that a person hesitates about or places strict conditions on, but for which they may still give informed consent. An action could be prohibited except under specific circumstances or an area of discomfort that someone wishes to avoid. Soft limits can also include actions that require a cautious approach or — while somewhat appealing — still generate an uncomfortable amount of apprehension in one or more partners. This balance allows partners to navigate boundaries thoughtfully, fostering trust and mutual respect in intimate situations. The limits creates a framework for exploration while maintaining emotional safety.

=== Requirement limit ===
A requirement limit, or must-limit, is something without which one or more partners will not participate in the scene. Examples include “lots of hair pulling is a must-limit for me” or “if you're going to flog me, I'll need lots of aftercare.”

=== Time limit ===
A time limit is a set time period for which an activity or temporary relationship takes place. This is most common for scenes and casual play.

Some couples practice time limitations for relationships. They can be used to set time limits on phases of relationships, such as training or consideration.

== See also ==
- Glossary of BDSM
