= Top and bottom =

Top and bottom can mean more than one thing.

In the context of particle physics:

- Top quark
- Bottom quark

In the context of sexuality:

- Top, bottom and versatile, for penetrative acts
- Top, bottom, switch (BDSM), for BDSM interaction

In mathematics:

- the greatest element and least element of a partially ordered set
