= Hard limit =

Hard limit may refer to:

- Clipping (signal processing), in which a 'hard limit' clips an electronic signal at a certain threshold.
- Limits (BDSM), in which a 'hard limit' is an activity or context for an activity is considered completely off-limits in BDSM scenes and relationships.
