= WIITWD =

Acronym in the alternative sexualities community

WIITWD is an acronym in the alternative sexualities community for "What it is that we do". It is also sometimes written WIIWD (What it is we do). It is intended to include all activities that the mainstream would consider "kinky".

The term was developed in Usenet newsgroups when individuals pointed out that the popular term BDSM applied to only a fraction of the community. Some people, such as those solely into infantilism or cross-dressing do not get involved at all in the bondage, D/s or sadomasochism scenes, and as such reject the label BDSM, but still consider themselves part of the alternative community. Many also eschew the terms "fetish" or "kink".

So, in an attempt to be all-inclusive, the term "WIITWD" was developed and has enjoyed some popularity.

The term is purposely vague and broad, and many are not satisfied with it for that very reason. It has been said that nearly any sexual activity could be included under the acronym. The general policy, therefore, is to use WIITWD only in rare cases where there is a need to refer to the broadest possible group.

== History ==
The earliest recorded mention of WIITWD is in the Usenet group alt.sex.bondage by Steven Davis, January 9, 1995, in a summary/critique of writer Jon Jacobs' theories about what was and wasn't "real" kink. Davis explicitly attributes the term to another poster named Bill Bohrer.

"JJ believes that most people who are interested in what he calls D&S, what I call 'our thing' and Bill Borher calls wiitwd (what it is that we do) and most people on ASB call BDSM, are interested in power exchange. Though people tend to think of power exchange in terms of the DS component of BDSM, it can occur within any kind of encounter in which one person cedes power to another."

== See also ==
- List of BDSM terms
- List of BDSM topics
