= Edgeplay =

Dangerous sexual practice in BDSM

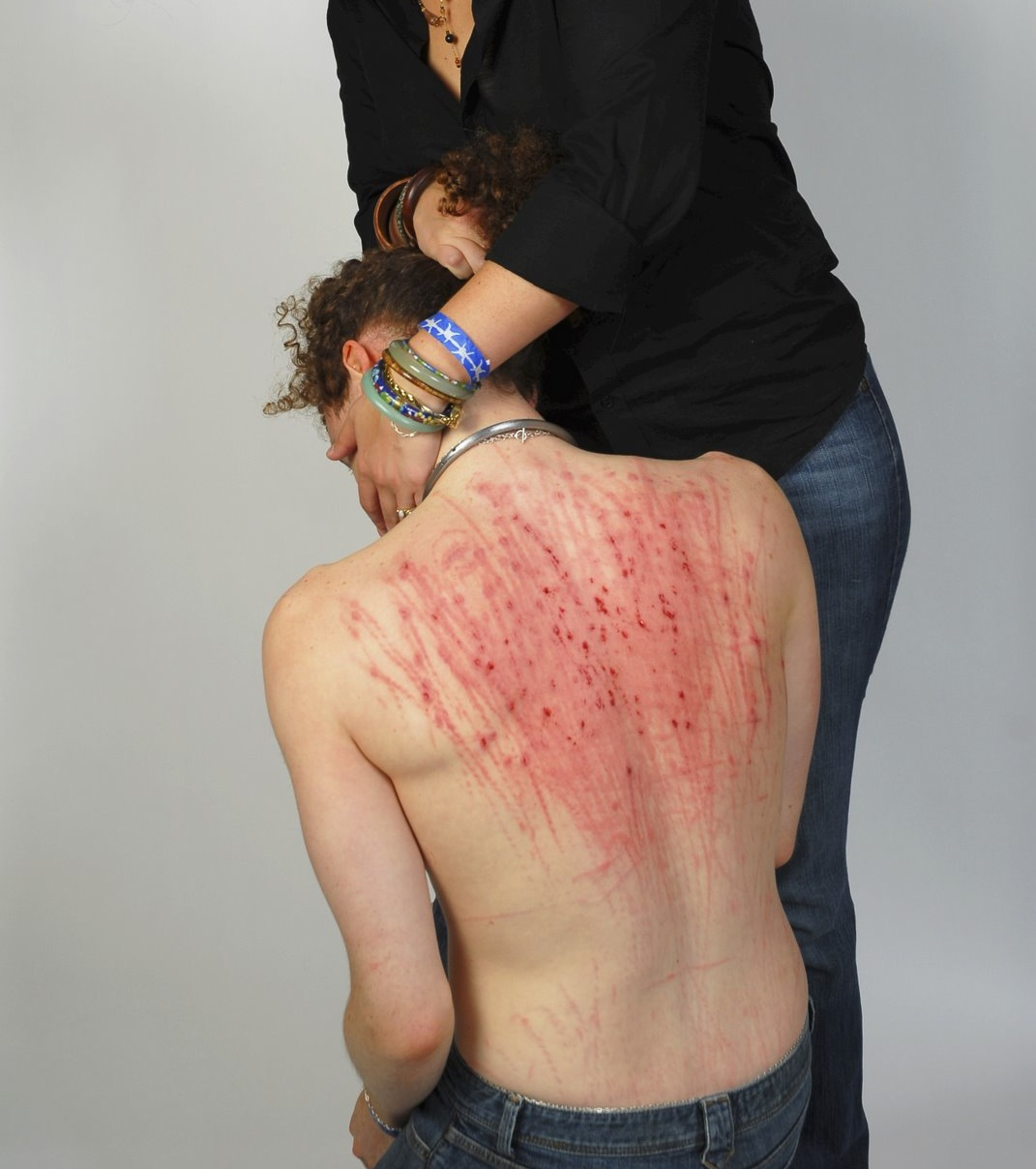
A submissive man is consoled by his mistress.

In BDSM, edgeplay refers to risk-aware consensual kink activities that may be physically or psychologically unsafe. Activities may lie at the "edge" of what is usually considered safe, sane and consensual.

Examples of edgeplay include erotic asphyxiation, fire play, knife play, fear play, temperature play, wax play, consensual non-consent, cutting, bloodplay, barebacking, urethral sounding, ageplay, salirophilia and scat.

== See also ==
- Consent (BDSM)
- Erotic electrostimulation
- Genital torture (disambiguation)
- Limits (BDSM)
- Predicament bondage
