= Nose torture =

Japanese form of BDSM

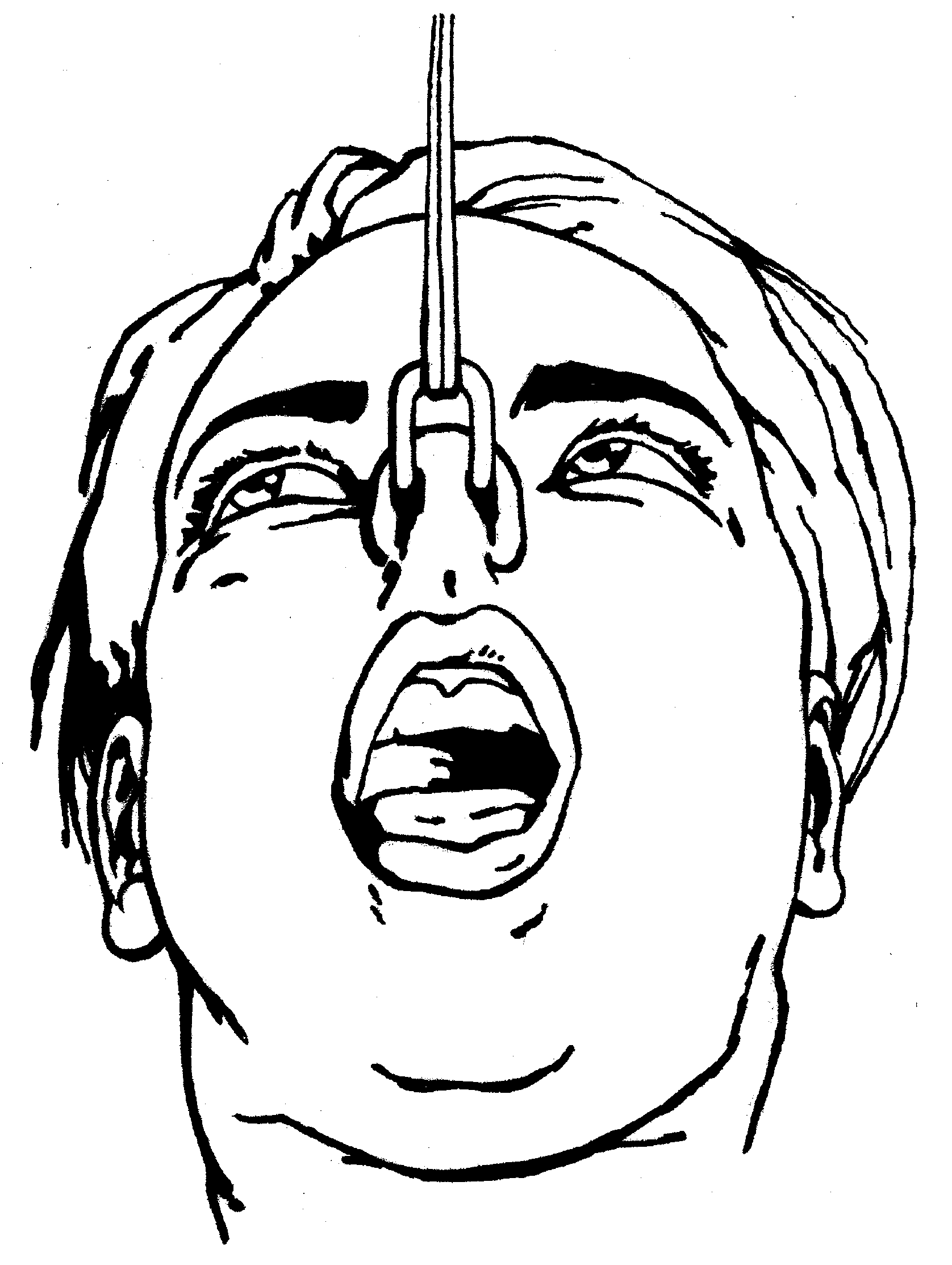
Illustration of a nose hook in use

Nose torture is a classic Japanese form of BDSM, that usually involves a hook applied in the nose — so called nosehook — that pulls the nose backwards. The level of pain and discomfort caused by this form of nose bondage is variable based on how hard the nosehook is made to pull. It is a mixture of real pain and humiliation for the slave to be in nose bondage and other forms of nose torture.

== Forms of nose torture ==
- Flip the nose open - pull the nostrils, squeeze and twist
- Nosehooks - pulling the nose backwards - nosehook either pulled hard by hand or tied above them to a collar round their neck
- Nose caning - a small thin stick (needs to be a flexible stick that can bend/swirp) that can be flicked up on the nose from below.
- Clothespegs on and in the nose. Squeezed and played with - snapped on and pulled off - whipped off with a small precise whip.
- Metalclamp up the nose - a variety of metal clamps can be used and applied on the nostrils or inside the middle of the nose, a chain is attached to the metal clamps so it can be pulled and weighted.
- Hotwaxing the nose - Hotwax on top of the nose, dripped inside from the side, downwards inside.
