= Sexual roleplay =

Sexual and other interactions of people playing type roles

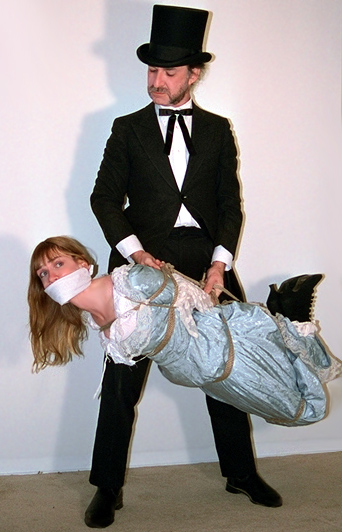
A bondage scenario using period costumes

Sexual roleplay is roleplay that has a strong erotic element. It may involve two or more people who act out roles in order to bring to life a sexual fantasy and may be a form of foreplay and be sexually arousing. Many people regard sexual roleplay as a means of overcoming sexual inhibitions. It may take place in the real world, or via an internet forum, chat-room, video-game, or email—allowing for physically or virtually impossible erotic interests to be enacted.

How seriously the play is taken depends on the participants, and the scenario may be anywhere from simple and ad hoc, to detailed and elaborate, including costumes and a script. The role-play may involve a fantasy based on any social role and could incorporate any kind of sexual fetish desired by the participants. Examples include items of clothing experienced as erotic or one or more participants being nude. The role-play may involve elements of dominance and submission including sexual bondage and erotic humiliation.

Depending on the play scenario, the roleplay may be before spectators, and bystanders may be unknowing participants in a roleplay. For example, the roleplay may involve house guests or may be taken out of a couple's home and into, say, a bar, street, park etc. A role may require, for example, one or both partners to flirt with a stranger, or for one partner to seduce the other partner's friend, etc. It may also call for one or both partners to, say, strip in a car or park.

The popularity of the Internet has also allowed for online sexual encounters, known as cybersex, which may involve roleplay. In a 2015 US survey, up to 22% of respondents stated that they had performed sexual role play in their lifetime.

== BDSM ==
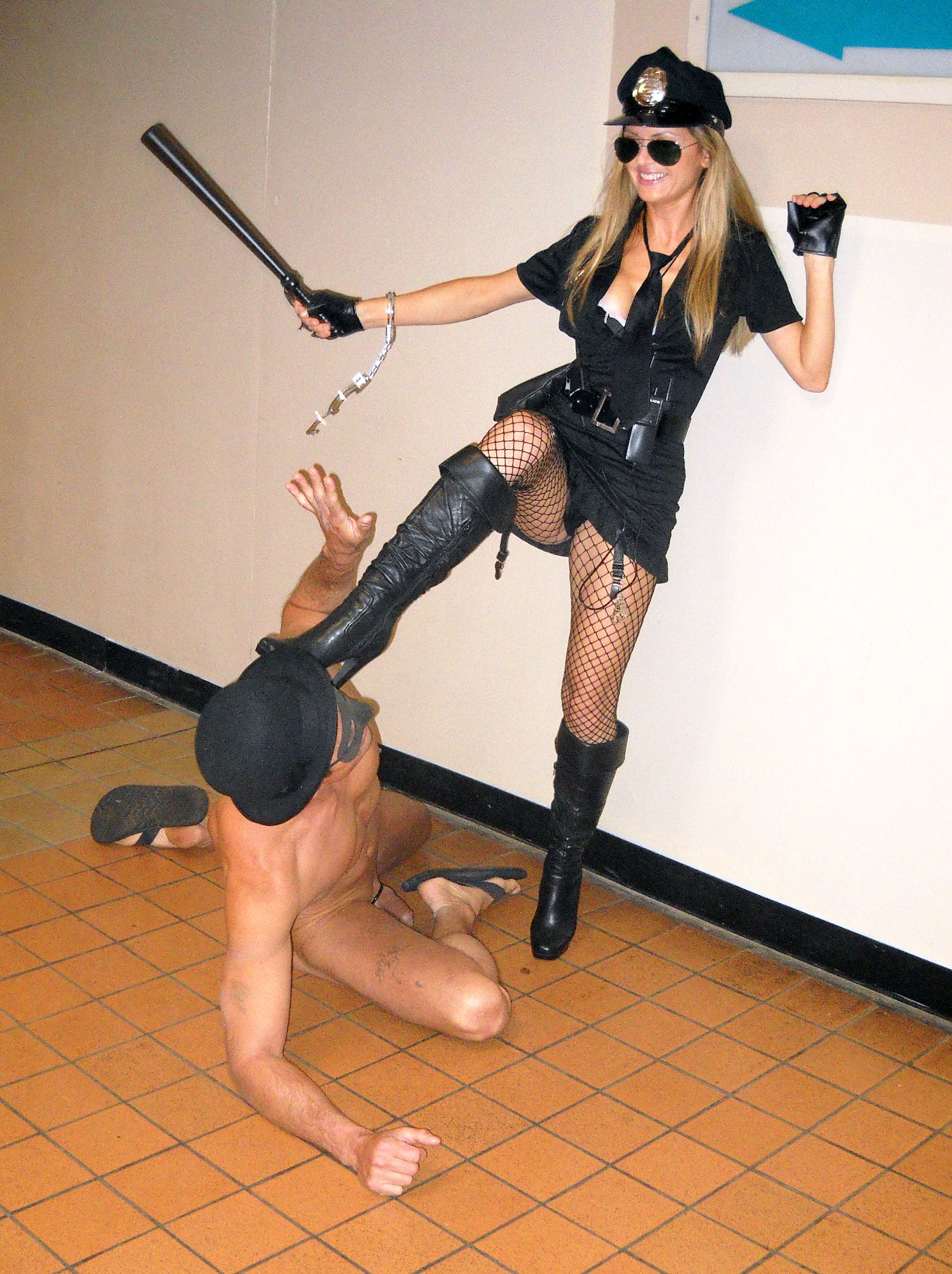
Female police officer dominating a bandit man in a sexual roleplay

Many of the most common sexual roleplays involve a power differential and form part of the dominance and submission aspect of BDSM. Roles can be general designations of power positions, or very specific, detailed fantasies. Some people, such as those living the Gorean lifestyle, make use of an entire imaginary world. The controlling player is often called the top or dominant while the controlled individual is called the bottom or submissive. It can be considered dangerous and therefore a safeword is advised to continue the safety of other(s) in such acts.

== Examples of scenarios ==
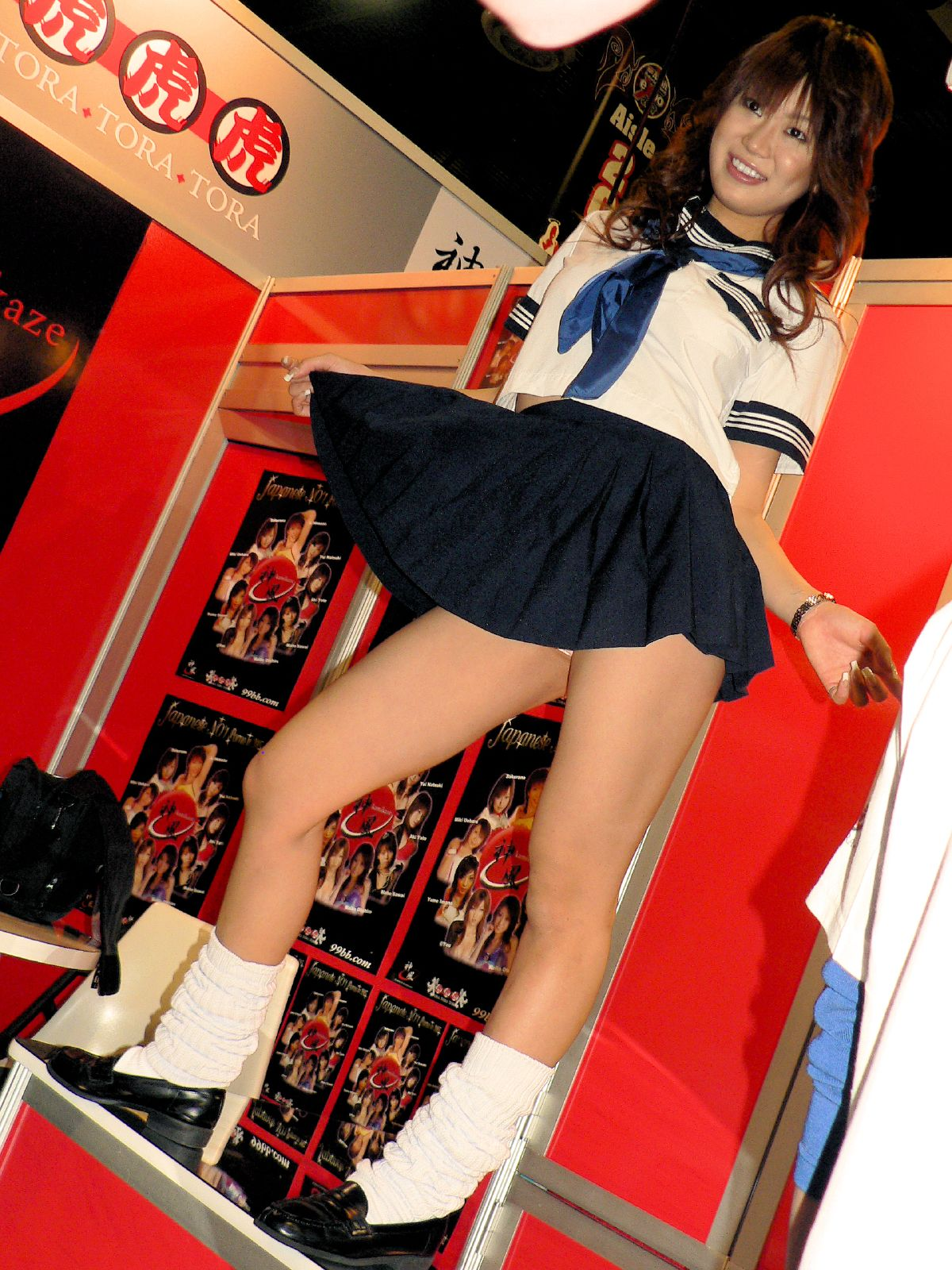
Uniform fetish: A Japanese woman dressed as a school student.

Common scenarios include:

- Burglary
- Doctor/Nurse/Patient: medical fetishism where the participants play the roles of doctor, nurse, or patient, e.g., enema play.
- Escort – Client: one partner assumes the role of paid escort for an encounter.
- Executive – Secretary: one partner assumes the role of a business executive while the other takes the role of their secretary.
- Handyman – Housewife: the tradesman enters the housewife's home initially with the intent of carrying out plumbing/maintenance work.
- Marriage/committed relationship: unmarried/non-monogamous partners behave as a married couple or long-term partners.
- Master – Slave: the slave is required to comply with all demands of the master.
- Photographer – Model: this allows one partner to photograph the other as a precursor to sexual interaction.
- Stripper – Client: one participant performs a striptease for the other.
- Teacher – Student: the student dresses for the part and must do as they are told, or are punished.
- Circus master - Lion: the lion is given a demand and must do it for the sake of entertainment.
- Sex doll - Doll owner: the sex doll must stay still and be obedient.
- Pilot – flight attendant: One partner takes on the role of the pilot while the other plays a seductive flight attendant.
- Mechanic – client: While one partner plays the mechanic the other takes on the role of the client. The client tries to pay the mechanic via seduction.
- Soldier – girlfriend: A returning soldier is surprised by his girlfriend in a stunning lingerie set.

Other scenarios include:

- Ageplay: where an individual acts and/or treats another as if they were a different age. The practice can be regressive, in which the goal is to re-experience childhood, or sexual, recreating a sexual relationship with people of the pretended ages. Generally this can involve someone pretending to be younger than they actually are, but more rarely can involve assuming an older role.
- Animal roleplay: where a player is treated as a non-human animal such as a dog, pony, or cat.
- Authority figure/Misbehaving Adult: where a player takes on the role of an authority figure and blackmails or humiliates their partner into sexual activity.
- Clown kink in the manner of coulrophilia between a young person and a performing mime, jester, or circus clown
- Gender-play: where one or more players take on roles of another gender.
- Incest fantasy: also known as incest play, where two or more play the role of family members.
- Owner/Inanimate object: such as the bottom being human furniture.
- Prison fetish: situational play set in a prison environment. Given real life prisons are same-sex communities, this fetish does lend itself to male on male or female on female activities and settings. Opposite gender play is also possible between inmates and guards, a co-ed facility/institution, or a simulated conjugal visit between an inmate and spouse/partner. Prison play is also an expansion of the uniform fetish by use of inmate, guard, and staff uniforms.
- Torturer/Captive prisoner: where one player is a captor who abuses the other, can also include ravishment and kidnap scenarios.
- Uniform fetishism: one participant dresses in uniform (for instance as a school student, cheerleader, French maid, etc.), while the other participant plays an authority figure (e.g., a parent, teacher, coach, police officer). Can also include scenarios with both participants in uniforms.
- Supernatural Seductions: One participant takes the role of a predatory vampire, incubus, succubus or witch and seduces, enthralls or claims the other participant as their victim.
- Rape play involves acting out roles of coercive sex with communication, consent and safety being especially crucial elements.

Sexologist Gloria Brame lists a number of these scenarios, as does Trevor Jacques.
