= Safeword =

Safety signal used in BDSM

In BDSM, a safeword is a code word, series of code words or other signal used by a person to communicate their physical or emotional state, typically when approaching, or crossing, a physical, emotional, or moral boundary. Some safewords are used to stop the scene outright, while others can communicate a willingness to continue, but at a reduced level of intensity.

== Description ==
Safewords are usually agreed upon before playing a scene by all participants, and many organized BDSM groups have standard safewords that all members agree to use to avoid confusion at organized play events. They are usually verbally spoken, but can also consist of physical or visual gestures. Safewords are especially important during consensual non-consent and rape roleplay scenes, as saying "stop" in those contexts is usually part of the scene.

Some couples may feel that they do not need a safeword, depending on the practices involved, since the role of a safeword is filled by usual forms of communication. Less commonly, some couples may agree to abandon the use of safewords including the ability to withdraw consent altogether, especially those that practice forms of edgeplay or those in Master/slave relationships. In such cases, the choice to give up the use of safewords is a consensual act on the part of the bottom or submissive. This practice is often considered controversial.

=== Traffic light system ===
The most common safeword system is the "traffic light" system, in which "red" means "stop", "amber" or "yellow" means "proceed with caution", and "green" means "more, please!" Some people incorporate other colors into the system, such as "blue" or "purple" for dissociation and other emotional triggers. "Blue" may also be used to signify a medical emergency.
