= Consent in BDSM =

Facet of BDSM

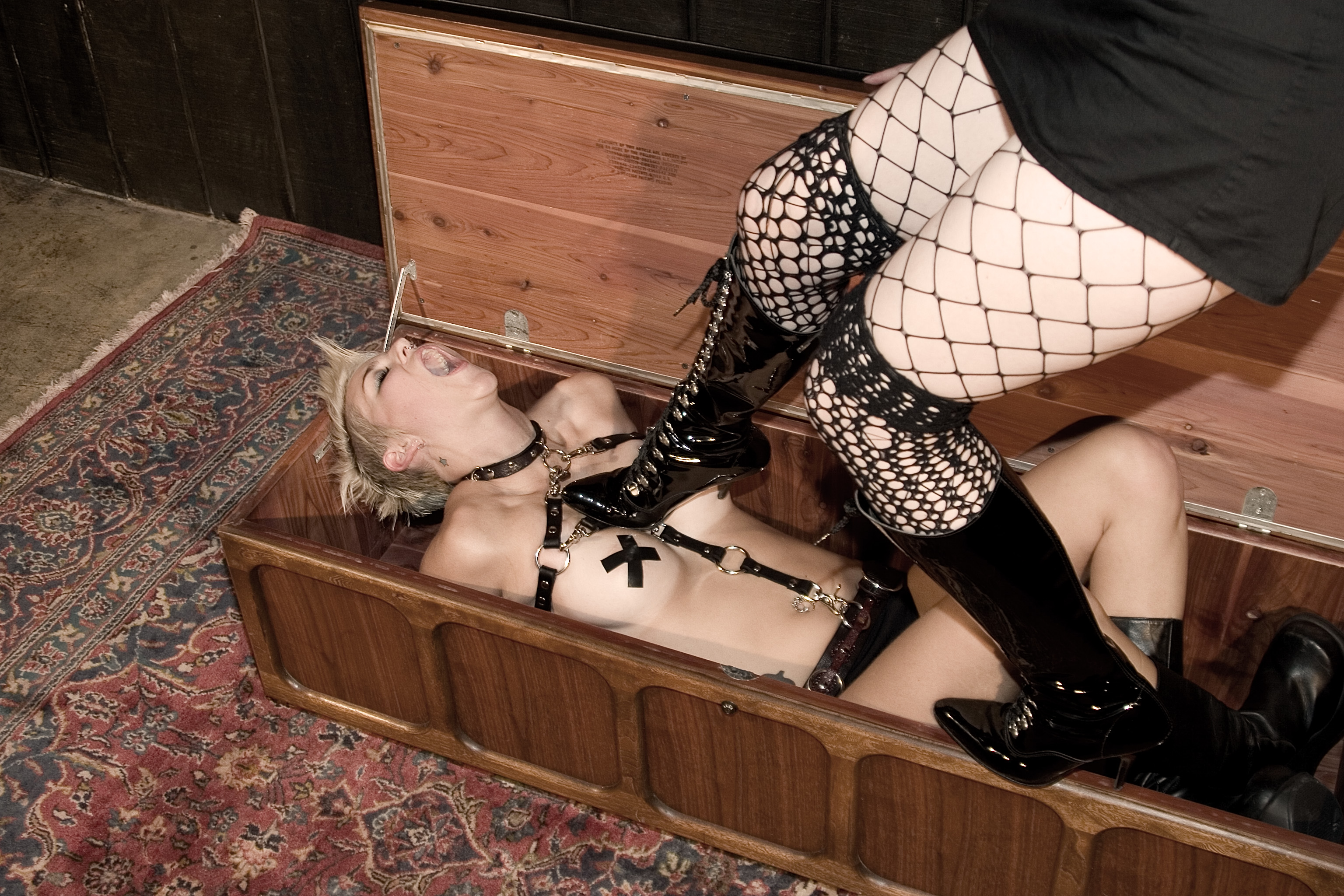
Submissive woman being pushed into a box with her consent.

Consent within BDSM is the explicit and informed agreement by a participant to engage in specific acts or types of relationships. It bears much in common with the concept of informed consent and is simultaneously a personal, ethical and social issue. It is an issue that attracts much attention within BDSM, resulting in competing models of consent such as safe, sane and consensual and risk-aware consensual kink. Observers from outside the BDSM community have also commented on the issue of consent in BDSM, sometimes referring to legal consent which is a separate and largely unrelated matter. However, the presence of explicit consent within BDSM can often have implications for BDSM and the law and, depending on the country the participants are in, may make the differences between being prosecuted or not.

Where an act has been previously consented to, the consent can be terminated at any point, and by any participant, through using a safeword. Within the BDSM community, it is generally considered a high risk activity to engage in BDSM without a safeword. Acts undertaken with a lack of explicit consent may be considered abusive and those who ignore the use of a safeword may be shunned within the BDSM subculture. One study has shown that BDSM negotiations to establish consent consist of four parts covering style of play, body parts, limits and safewords.

== Consensual non-consent ==
Consensual non-consent (CNC), also called meta-consent and blanket consent, is a mutual agreement to be able to act as if consent has been waived. It is an agreement where comprehensive consent is given in advance, with the intent of it being irrevocable under most circumstances. This often occurs without the submissive having foreknowledge of the exact actions planned.

Consensual non-consent is considered a show of extreme trust and understanding. It is controversial within BDSM circles, even often frowned upon due to concerns about abuse and safety. It is mainly limited to those in Master/slave relationships. It is also applicable where a submissive will submit to being disciplined in a manner they don't want to at the time they are getting punished but do see a need for being subjected to it in the relationship.

== Models and philosophy ==
BDSM communities share a common language of consent. Various models are expressed as acronyms representing differing approaches towards a philosophy of consent.

=== SSC ===
Safe, sane, and consensual (SSC) is the most recognizable and popular model of consent in BDSM circles, though not without criticism. It means that everything is based on safe activities, that all participants are of sufficiently sound mind in their conduct, and that all participants do consent.

=== RACK ===
Risk-aware consensual kink (RACK) is the second most popular consent model. It is generally permissive of certain risky sexual behaviors, as long as the participants are fully aware of the risks. It was created to overcome perceived shortcomings of SSC.

=== Other models ===
Other less well known models of consent in BDSM include CCC, which stands for Committed, Compassionate, Consensual and the 4 C's — Caring, Communication, Consent, Caution.

== Legal aspects ==
The 2007 conviction of Glenn Marcus on counts of sex trafficking and forced labor renewed much debate on the issue of consent in BDSM, both within and outside the community. In a similar case of an accusation made by a participant that the activities had not been consensual, in April 2007 two UK men were convicted of false imprisonment in a case where a third party who had been treated like a dog asserted the matter had not been consensual.

== Consent within BDSM fiction ==
With the release of such books and films as the Fifty Shades of Grey, BDSM has since been more spoken about by people. What once was probably hidden for a variety of societal reasons is now subject to open discussion.

Fifty Shades is the popular exemplar and consent is shown through a series of contracts and frank discussions. There is controversy as to how far it goes and how well it defines the lines of consent, but it provides a starting point for any discussion.

== See also ==
- Glossary of BDSM
- Limits
- Negotiation
- Rape fantasy
- Scene
