= Genital torture =

Genital torture (sometimes called genitorture) may refer to:

- A technique used in torture, the non-consensual infliction of suffering
- Cock and ball torture, a consensual BDSM sexual practice

== See also ==
- Breast torture, a consensual BDSM sexual practice
- Genitorturers, a rock band
