= Top, bottom, switch =

Roles in BDSM practices

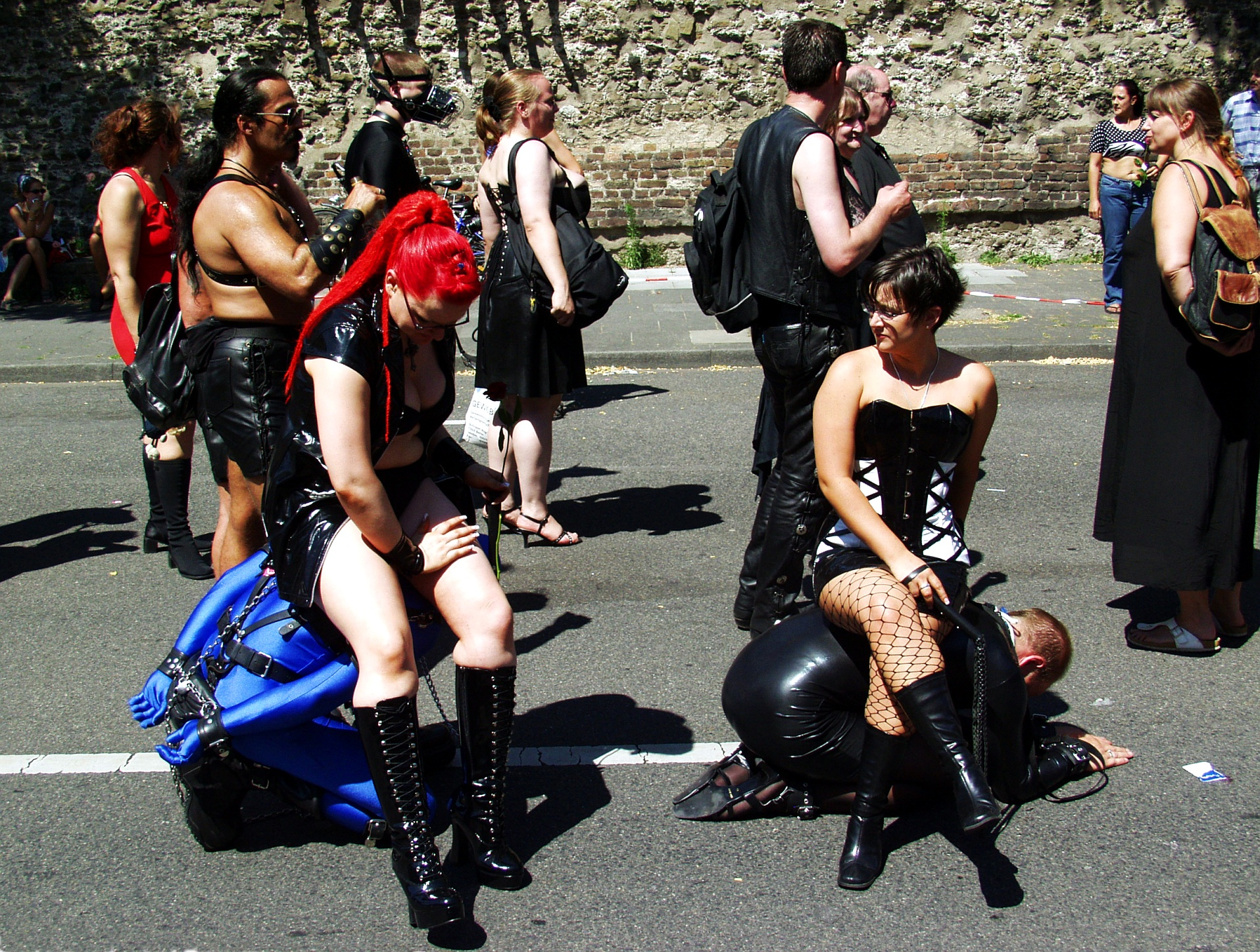
BDSM couples, with the femme tops sitting on male bottoms who are kneeling, leashed and in handcuffs, at 2006 Cologne Pride, Germany.

The terms top, bottom, and switch are used to describe an individual's role during a BDSM activity. They may more broadly denote a psychological, social, or sexual identity, or indicate one's usual preference. Terms top and bottom refer to giving and receiving roles, not to who is physically on top in a particular sexual act. A switch is someone who can act as both a top and bottom. Older terms of "active" and "passive" are still often used. In the context of gay sex, the terms are top, bottom, and versatile.

== Top ==
In BDSM, top can mean either a dominant partner in BDSM play or a partner who applies stimulation to another, and who may or may not be dominant.

Topping from the bottom refers to a person agreeing to submit, but trying to control the scene in a way that goes against the negotiated power dynamic.

A service top is a person who applies sensation or control to a bottom, but does so at the bottom's explicit instructions.

== Bottom ==
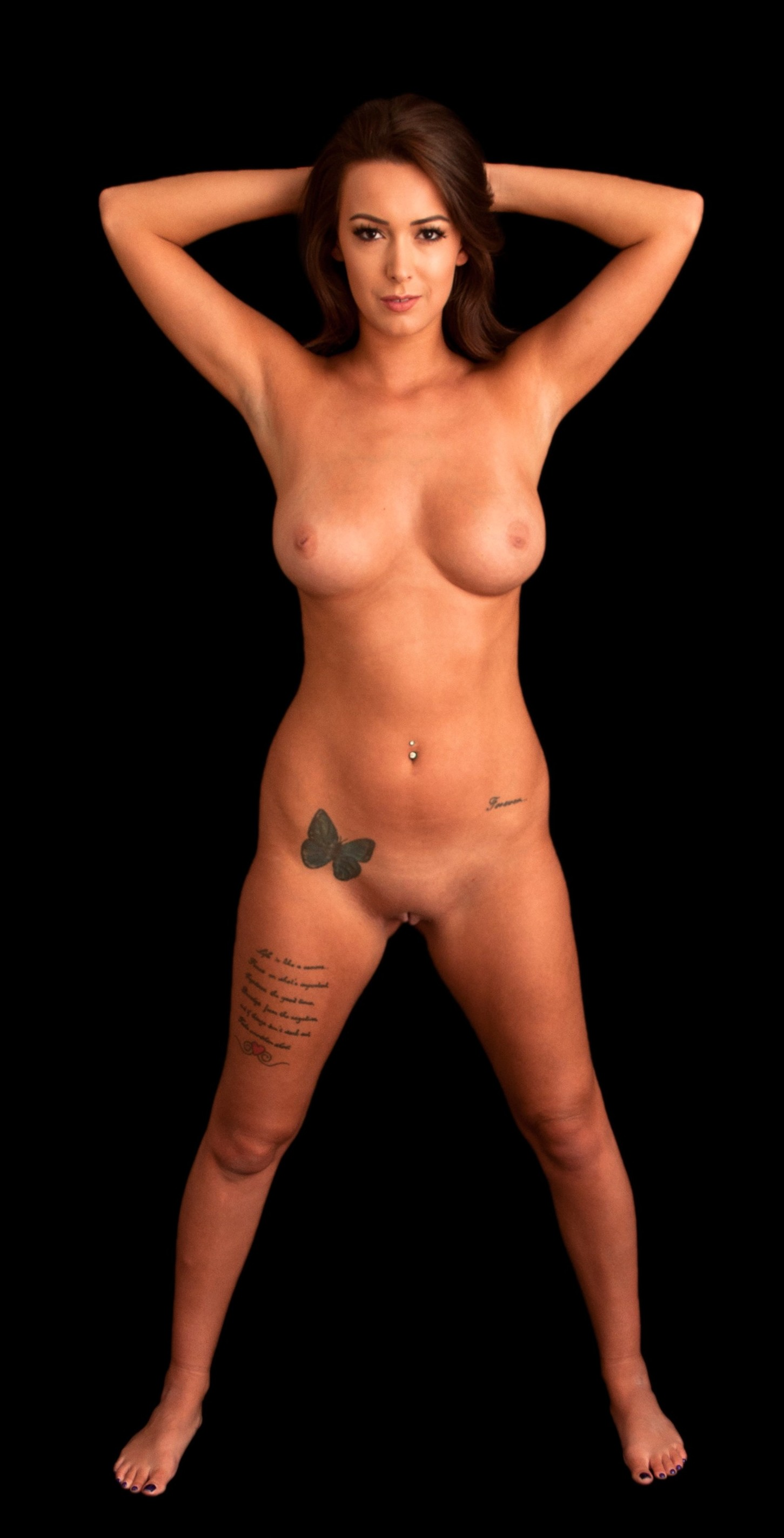
A nude submissive in "Inspection" pose - used in some forms of D/s dynamics.

Bottom can mean either a submissive partner in sexual play, or a partner who receives stimulation from another who may or may not be submissive.

A bottom in BDSM does not have to be the submissive; for example, a masochist may agree to being spanked without entering a power exchange dynamic.

== Switch ==
A switch is someone who participates in BDSM activities sometimes as a top and other times as a bottom or sometimes as a dominant and other times as a submissive.

== Dominant and submissive ==
Those who take the superior position in dominance and submission scenes and relationships are called dominants, doms, or dommes (feminine), while those who take the subordinate position are called submissives or subs. A top is not necessarily a dominant, and vice versa, and a bottom is not necessarily submissive. Other labels may be used depending on the individual or the relationship.

The main difference between a dominant and a top is that the dominant exhibits control within a power exchange dynamic, while a top applies sensations within a scene. A top may or may not be a dominant.

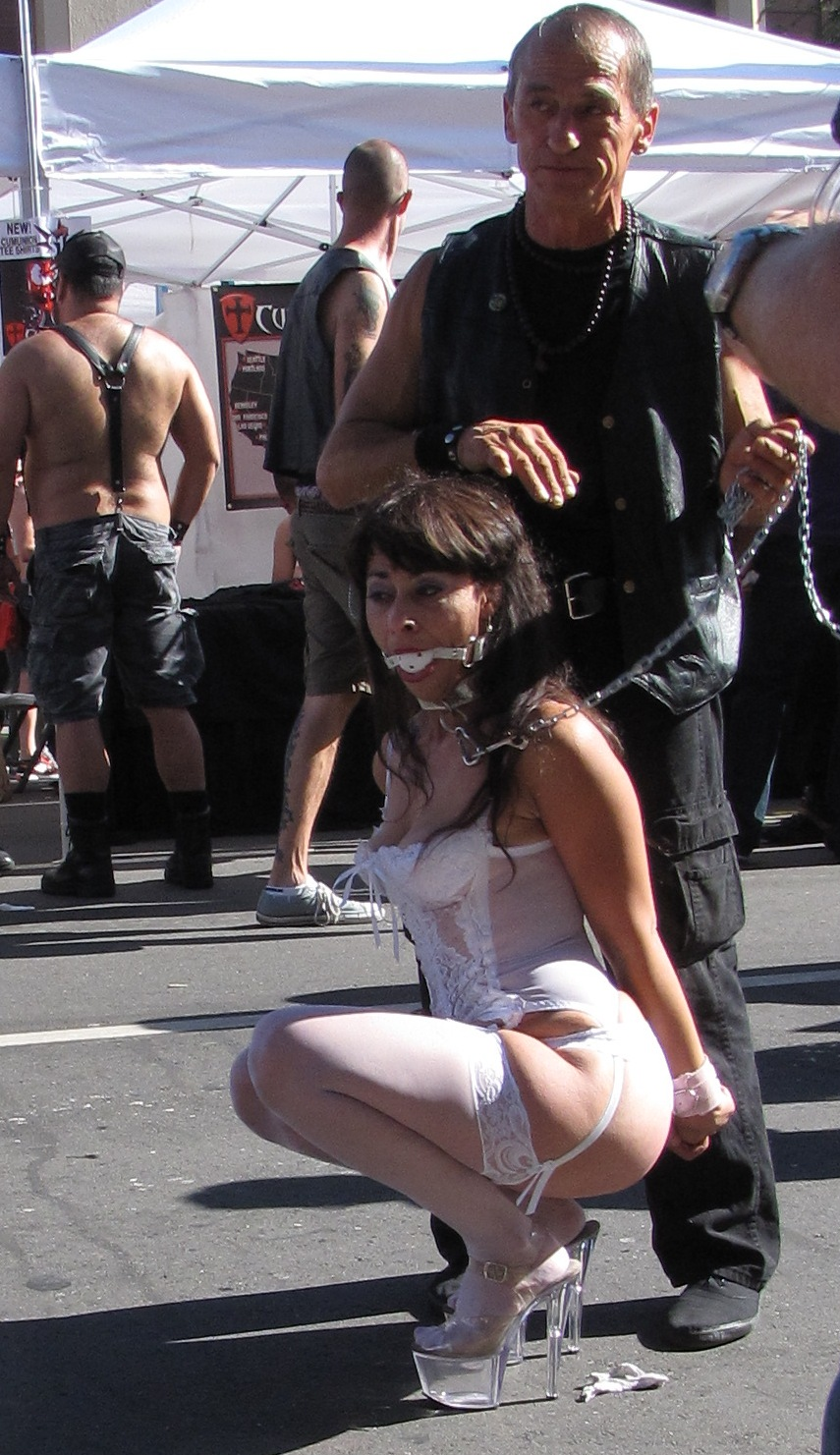
A gagged woman with bound hands sits in a submissive position. Her partner holds her with a chain leash tied around her neck at Folsom Street Fair.

The main difference between a submissive and a bottom is that a submissive cedes power in a power exchange dynamic. A bottom may or may not be a submissive, as power exchange does not have to be a component of their kinky play.

Many distinguish top/bottom from dominant/submissive by seeing top/bottom as an expression of physical activity, while dominant/submissive is an expression of psychological authority. In both types of relationships - top/bottom and dominant/submissive - consent, negotiations, and mutual respect and support for one another are keys to healthy dynamics.

Beginning in the 1970s, in some American contexts, people would identify their interests by wearing a set of keys on the side of their belt or a color-coded handkerchief in their rear pockets. This practice, called flagging, began in the gay male subculture.

== See also ==
- Glossary of BDSM
- Master/slave (BDSM)
- Sadomasochism
- Servitude (BDSM)
