= Wax play =

Method of sadomasochistic play

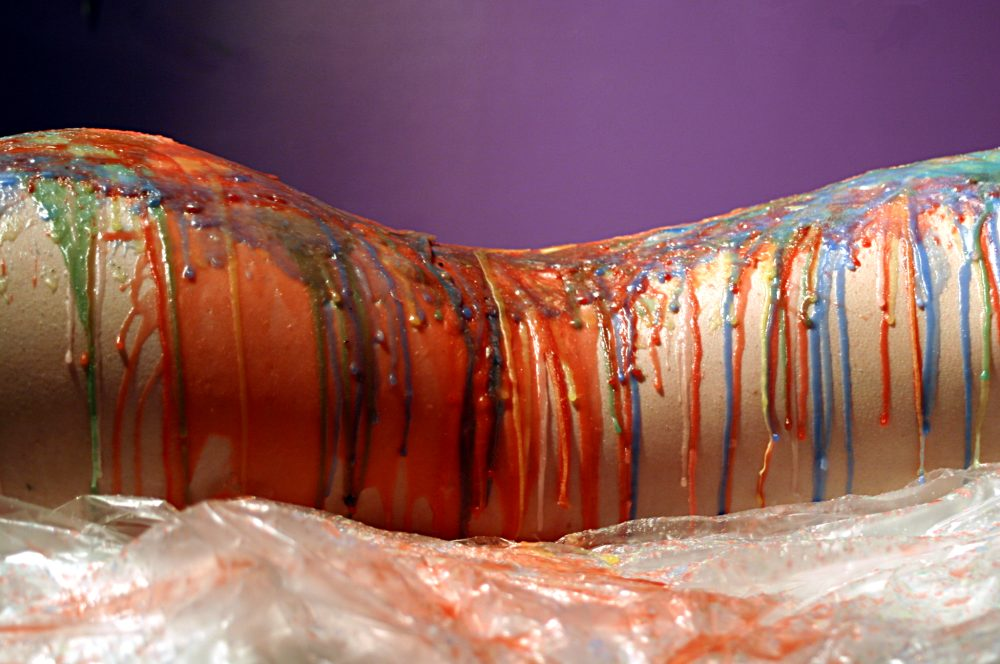
Wax play can create colourful patterns on the subject

Wax play is a form of temperature play practiced in a BDSM context, in which wax from a candle is dripped onto a person's naked skin, in order to introduce a slight burning sensation to the skin.

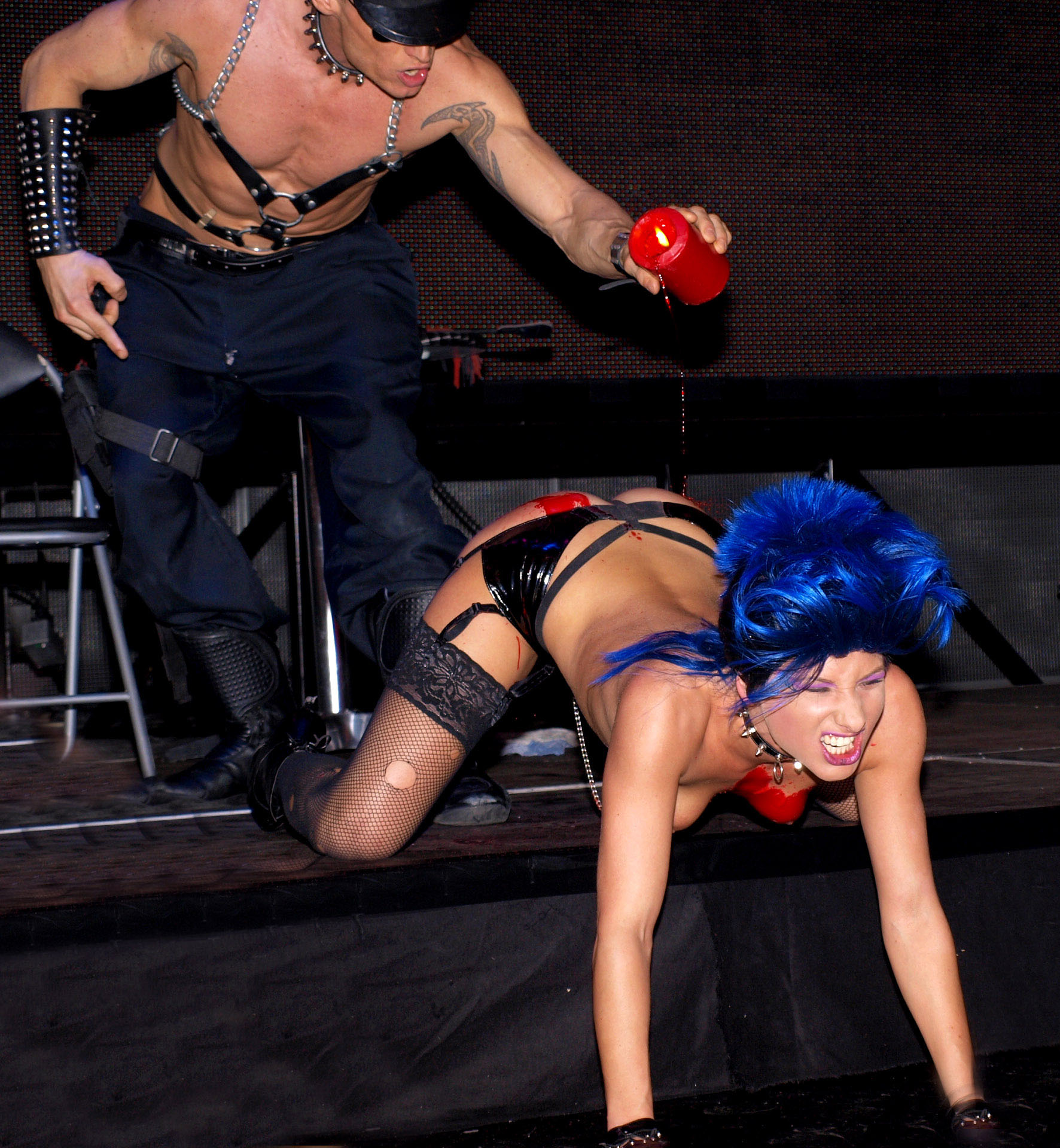
Man dripping wax on a submissive woman at Eros Pyramide, 2009

This is considered a moderately advanced form of play. If done wrong, wax play can cause burns severe enough to require medical attention.

== Common candle types ==
- Soy candles which commonly melt at around 46–57 °C (115-135 °F).
- Paraffin candles which typically melt at around 47–65 °C (117-149 °F).
- Beeswax candles which commonly melt at around 62–65 °C (144-149 °F) (unsafe for wax play).
- Microcrystalline wax which commonly melts at around 63–93 °C (145-199 °F) (unsafe for wax play).
- Stearin which commonly melts at around 80 °C (176 °F) (unsafe for wax play).

Candle additives such as dye, oils, and scents may increase the melting point.

The melting point of wax can be lowered by adding mineral oil.

== In popular culture ==
- Body of Evidence (1993) — Madonna's character binds her lover's arms together with his belt, then while he is helpless she teases and denies him sexual satisfaction, demonstrating his subjugation to her by pouring candle wax onto his penis before she has sex with him.
- I Like to Play Games (1995) — Another film in which a sexually domineering female character is aroused by tying up her partner and pouring hot wax onto his body.
- The Wolf of Wall Street (2013 film) — A dominatrix called Venice is seen melting the wax of a candle on the back of Jordan Belfort's body and he exclaims "I like it!" repeatedly.
