= Service-oriented submission =

Erotic practice

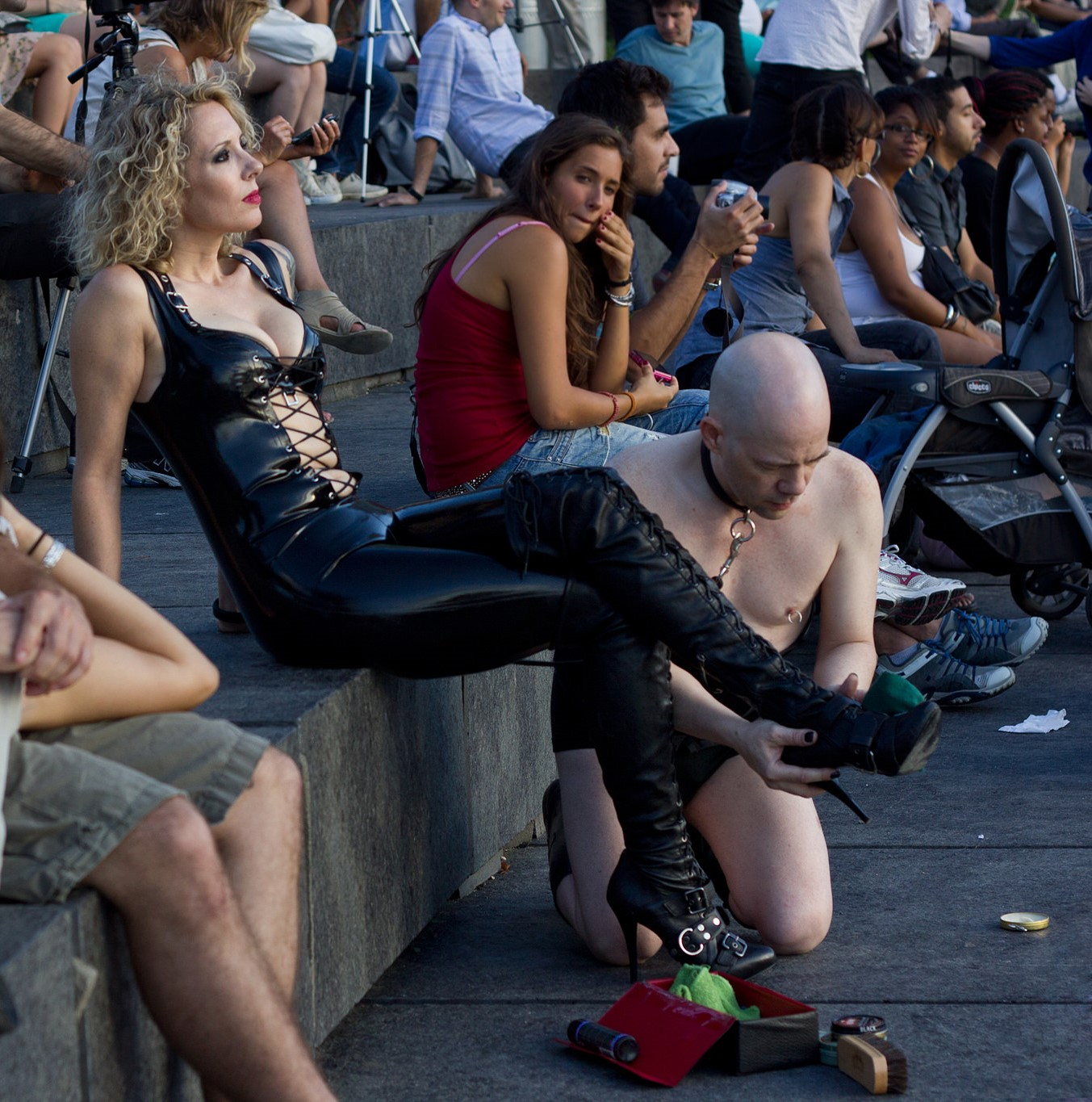
Male slave serving a dominant female by bootblacking, in New York City

In BDSM, service-oriented submission (or sometimes servitude) is the performance of personal tasks for a dominant partner, as part of a submissive role in a BDSM relationship. The submissive is sometimes said to be in service to the dominant. Service-oriented submission is part of a spectrum of submissive behaviors, and not all submissives are service-oriented.

In domestic service roles, the submissive can receive pleasure and satisfaction from performing services for their dominant, such as serving as a butler, waitress, chauffeur, maid or housekeeper. Many derive satisfaction from being focused on the needs of another, rather than themselves.

Service-oriented submission can be performed in either servile, or dignified ways. Bootblacking is a service-oriented task performed within the leather subculture.

Bootblacking may sometimes involve boot-licking as part of the activity.

The satisfaction of service submission is often combined with the pleasures of fetishes, the pleasures of humiliation, or both. A submissive may rub his or her dominant's feet because the sub enjoys providing the service, has a foot fetish, enjoys being "lower" than the dominant, or any combination.

== See also ==
- Erotic humiliation
- Financial domination
- Maledom
- Master/slave (BDSM)
- Service top
- Sexual roleplay
- Top, bottom, switch (BDSM)
