= Sexual humiliation =

Sexual humiliation may refer to:

- Sexual abuse, or non-consensual sexual humiliation
- Erotic humiliation, or consensual sexual humiliation
