= Power exchange =

A power exchange may refer to:

- the entity that operates an electricity market at which electricity is traded
- Power exchange (BDSM), a lifestyle practised within BDSM
