= Animal roleplay =

Erotic roleplay related to BDSM

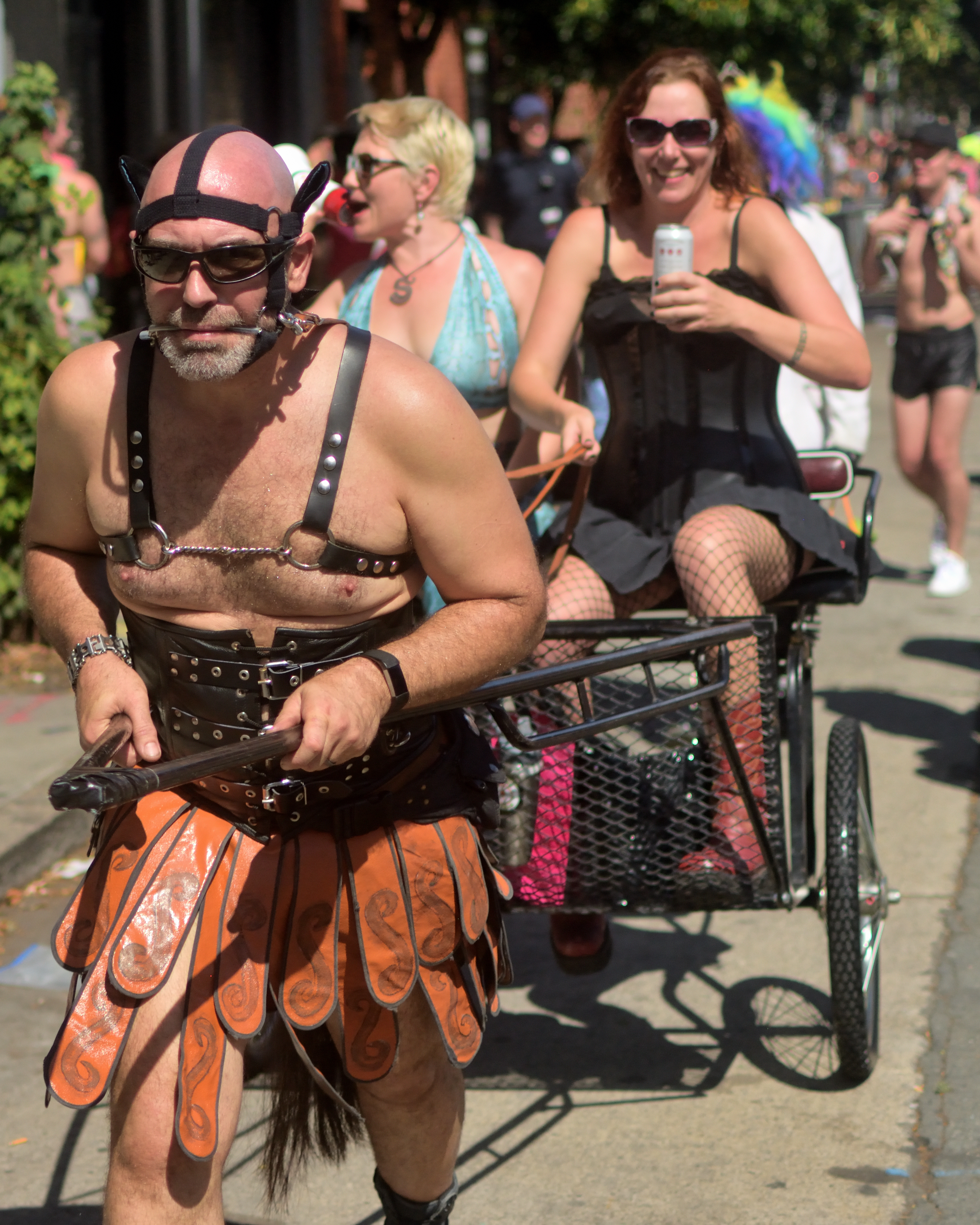
A pony-boy pulling his mistress seated on a sulky, at USA's Folsom Street Fair, the world's largest leather and kink festival.

Animal roleplay is a form of roleplay where at least one participant plays the part of a non-human animal. As with most forms of roleplay, its uses include play and psychodrama.

Animal roleplay may also be found in BDSM contexts, where an individual may take part in a dominant/submissive relationship by being treated as an animal. The activity is often referred to as petplay .

== Overview ==
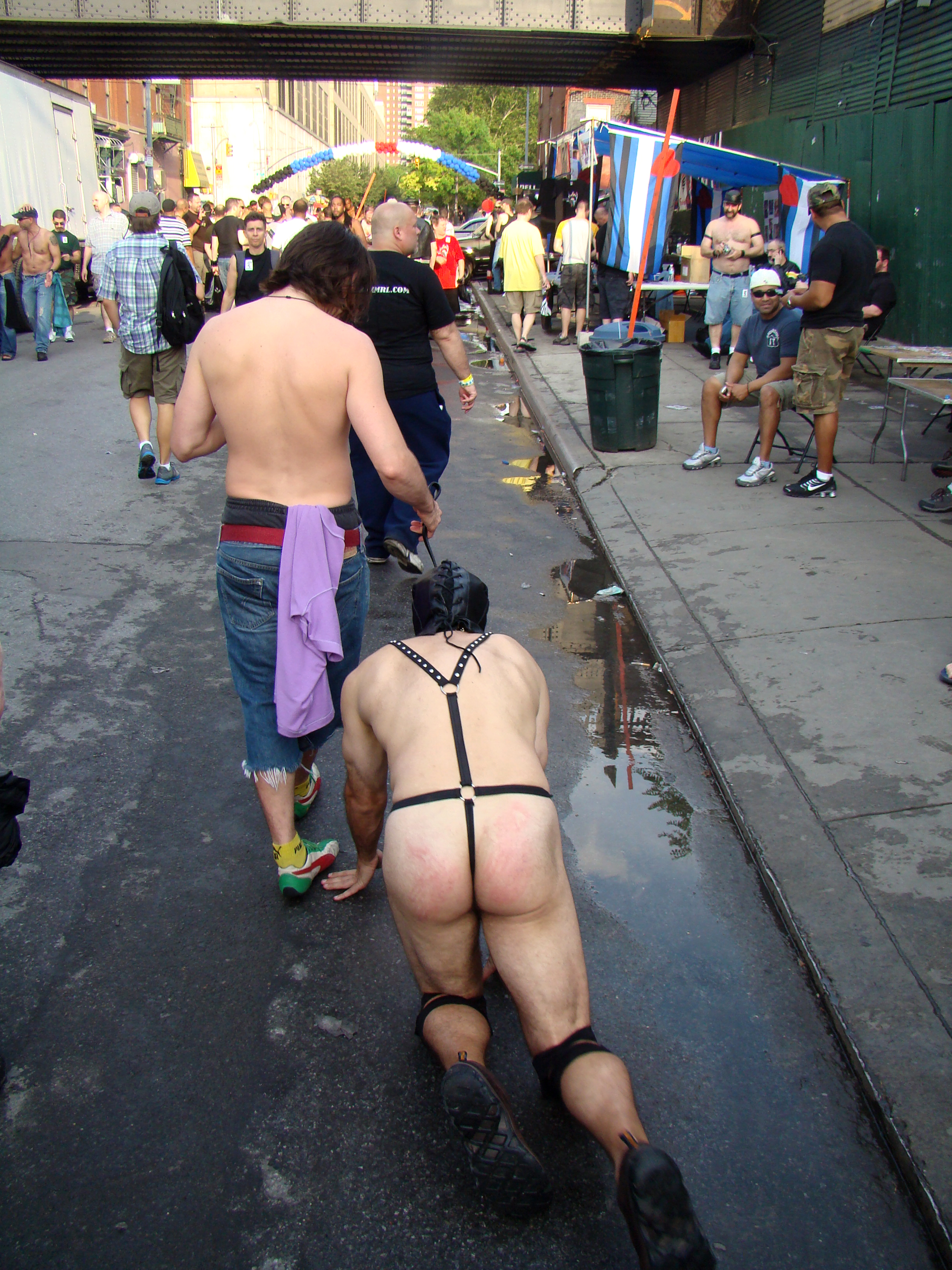
A man crawling like a pet animal at Folsom Street Fair. He is held using a dog leash.

Animal roleplay and petplay may be influenced by costuming, fiction, myth and legend, roleplay and psychodrama in their various aspects. Some of the earliest published images of animal play (especially pony play) are to be found in the work of John Willie, primarily in Bizarre magazine published from 1946 to 1959.

Some of the equipment that can be used in animal roleplay include leash, chain, bit gag, neck collar, bondage harness, catsuit, bodystocking, butt plug, muzzle, ballet boots, etc.

=== Cultural and ritual use ===
Non-sexual animal roleplay was a common and integral part of ritual in many tribal cultures both in recent and likely prehistoric times, where a member (or members) of the tribe would take the role physically and often spiritually of an animal that was either revered or hunted. Examples of the former include many of the American Indian tribes and Arctic native peoples. Examples of the latter are evidenced by cave paintings. In 1911, Julia Tuell photographed the last Animal Dance ("Massaum") performed by the Northern Cheyenne of Montana.

It is also sometimes used in education, especially physical education, as a way to encourage people to exercise the body in unusual ways, by mimicking various animals.

== Other forms ==
Some superheroes, heroines, and villains also feature elements related to pet play; such as DC Comics's Wildcat, Batman, Catwoman, the Penguin and Vixen, Marvel's Tigra, Man-Wolf and Black Cat, or even Nastassja Kinski's Irena Gallier in the 1982 film Cat People (a remake of the 1942 Simone Simon film), and Miss Kitty from the Brendan Fraser movie Monkeybone. In Miraculous, all the main superheroes of Paris, and the main villain, have animal-based powers. All involve animal qualities taken on by a human. Some would even count the enactment or spiritual belief in therianthropy (werewolves, werecats, etc.) as falling under human animal roleplay or transformation play as well.

Peter Shaffer's 1973 play Equus tells the story of a young man who has a pathological religious fascination with horses, but this appears closer to zoophilia than pet play. Andrew Lloyd Webber's 1981 musical Cats traces a tribe of urban cats, and in 2007 War Horse used full size puppets to play horses on stage.

== Erotic scenarios ==
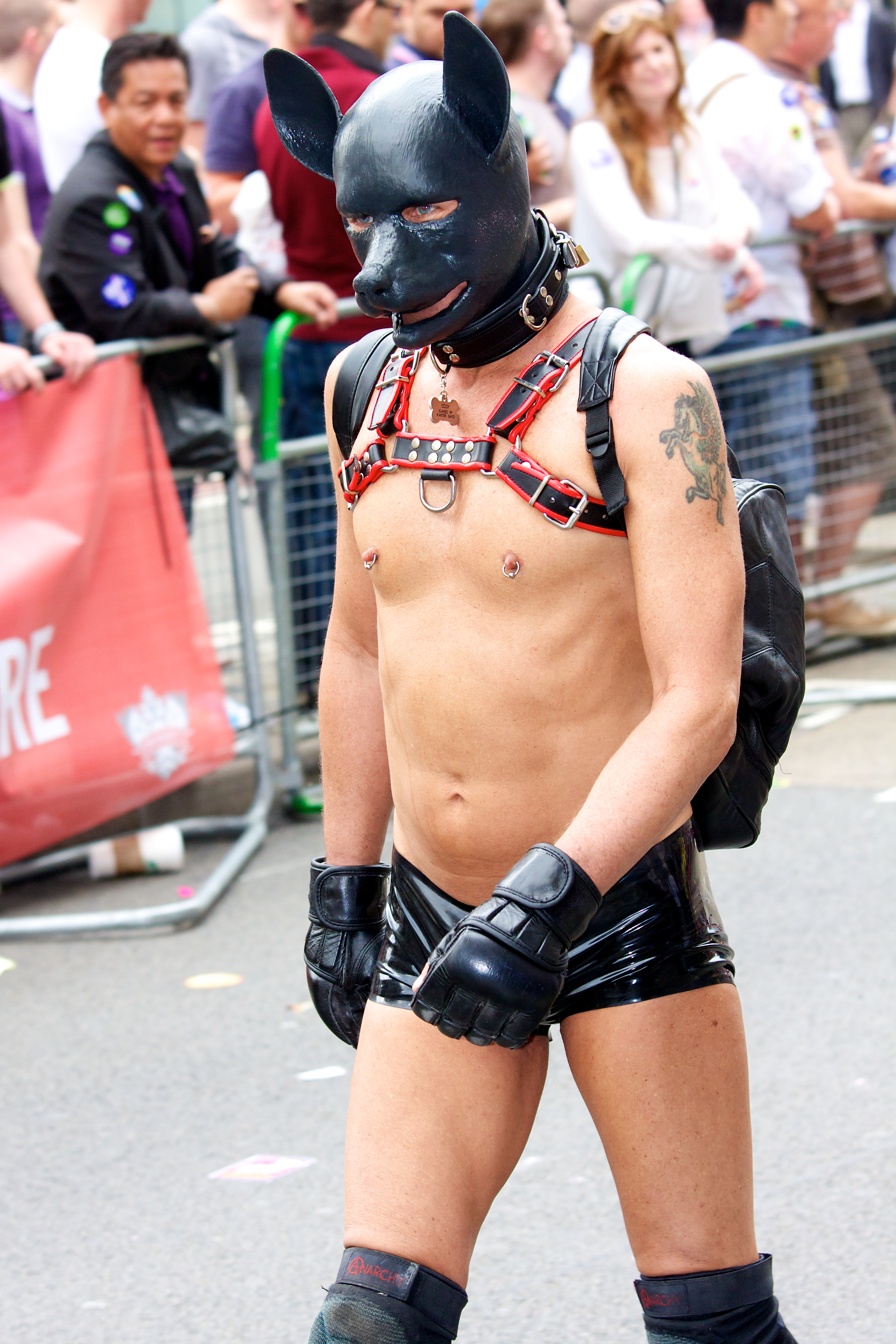
A man dressed as a dog at Pride Parade, London, 2011

Like much of erotic play and roleplay, animal roleplay in an erotic or relational context is entirely defined by the people involved and by their mood and interests at the time of play. It ranges from the simple imitation of a vocal "whinnying" of a horse to the barking, panting or playful nudging of a puppy, or playful behaviour of a kitten, to crawling around on all fours and being fed, or petted, by hand. To the greater extremes of dressing up as a pony in modified horse tack, masks, prosthetics and temporary bondage based body modification (such as binding the forearms to the upperarms and/or the calves to the thighs).

Public participation in human animal roleplay is varied. A couple could inconspicuously role-play a pet play scene in public, which would look to the casual observer like one partner is merely stroking the other's neck. In the case of some BDSM fetishists, one partner may wear a collar with a leash attached.

The reasons for playing such a character or animal can vary as much as the physical manifestations and intensity of the play. Some people enjoy being able to "cut loose" into a different, or more dynamic personality (see other variations). In some cases, pet play is seen as a loving, quiet cuddling time where there is no need for verbalizations and the simple act of stroking, rubbing and holding the other partner is satisfying or reassuring in and of itself for those involved. For others, there may be a spiritual side to it. Some feel closer to their animal totem, while others may identify with something akin to a deeper side or part of their own psyche (known as therianthropy). For still others, there is the experience of power exchange setup in a context or structure which they can accept.

Some cases could be considered a type of animal transformation fantasy. They can have strong elements of exhibitionism, be totally enjoyed in the privacy of the home, or lie somewhere between either boundary. While not widespread, erotic human-animal roleplay is still enjoyed by a sizable number of people. However, it is still primarily identified with BDSM practice. Though commonly misinterpreted as being associated with furry or other alternative lifestyle activities, that is generally not the case though some instances may exist.

For most participants, it has no connection whatsoever with bestiality, which is controversial and would usually be considered edgeplay in BDSM circles.

=== Other considerations ===
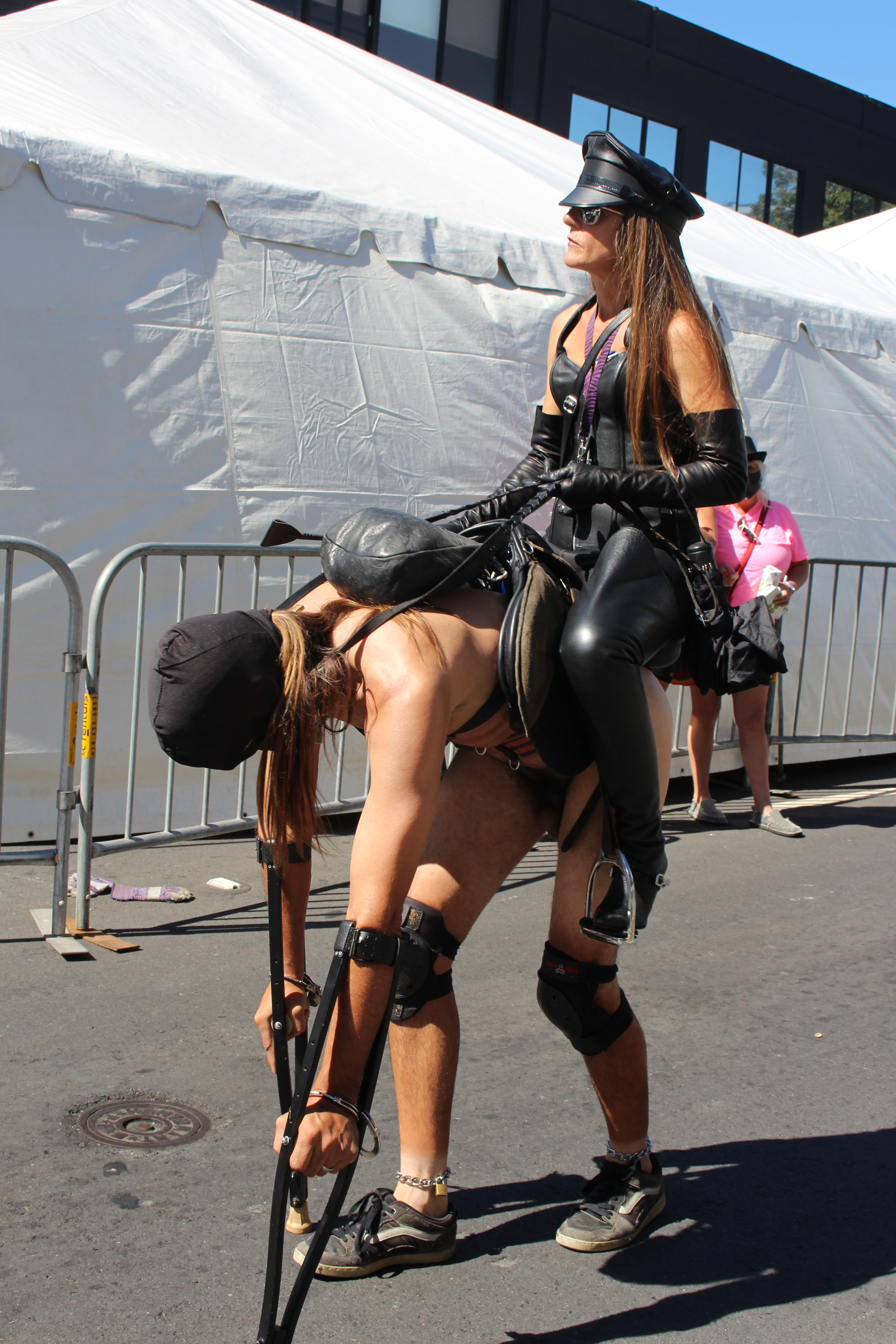
Woman riding a man at Folsom Street Fair

Each type of play can focus on a certain "strength" of an animal character. Pony play often involves the practice and training that a horse owner or trainer would put their horse through to learn how to walk, canter, etc., as modified for human limbs. Puppy and kitten play often can involve BDSM related discipline. Cow Play often involves fantasies of lactation and impregnation. The usual limits of safe, sane and consensual apply to roleplay as much as any other activity between humans who accept and respect their partner's interests and limits. For most, this does not include bestiality.

Just because one partner is playing the "pet" does not necessarily make them the passive or submissive play partner in the scene.

== Types of animal roleplay ==
The following section lists specific animal roleplay communities centered around a single type of animal.

=== Pony play ===
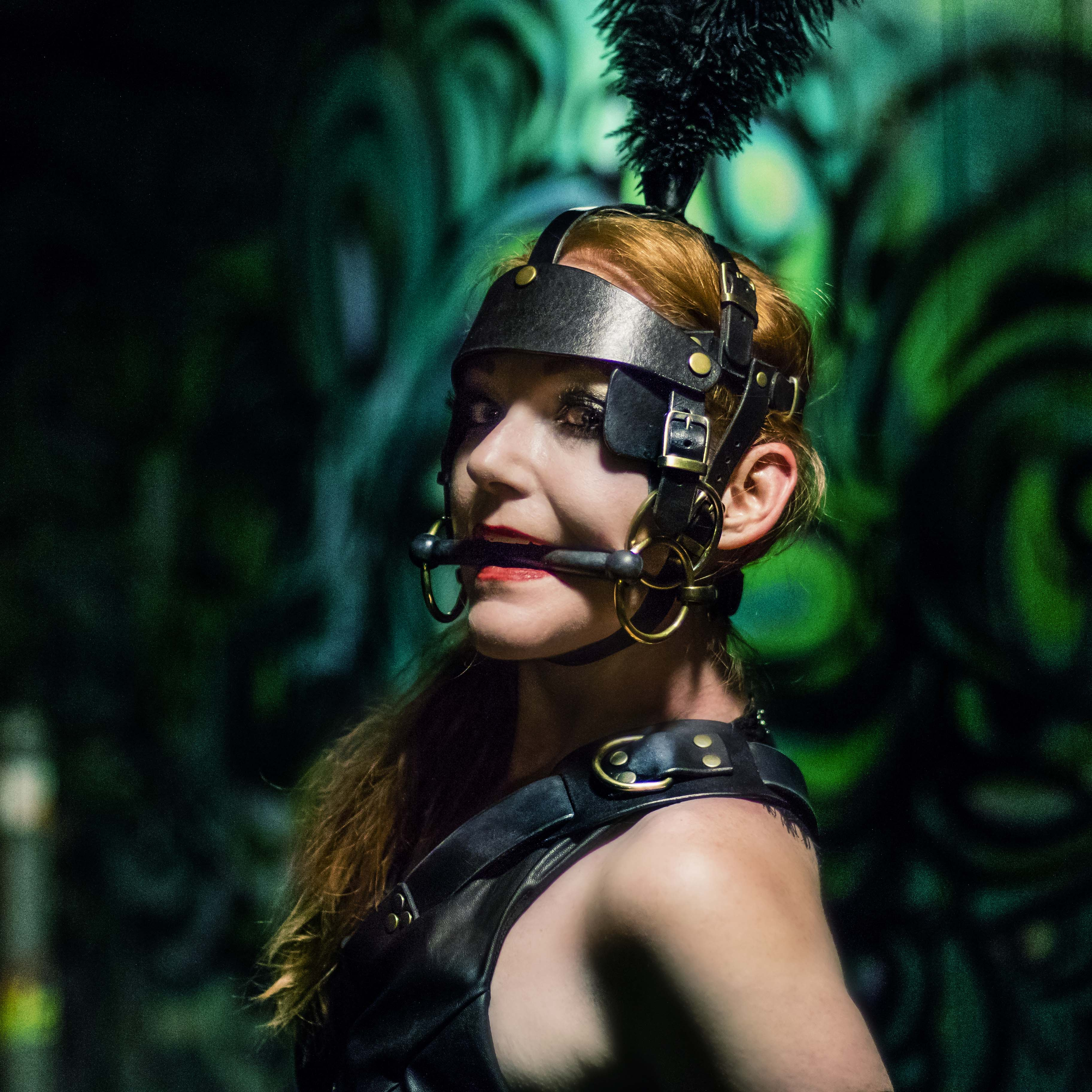
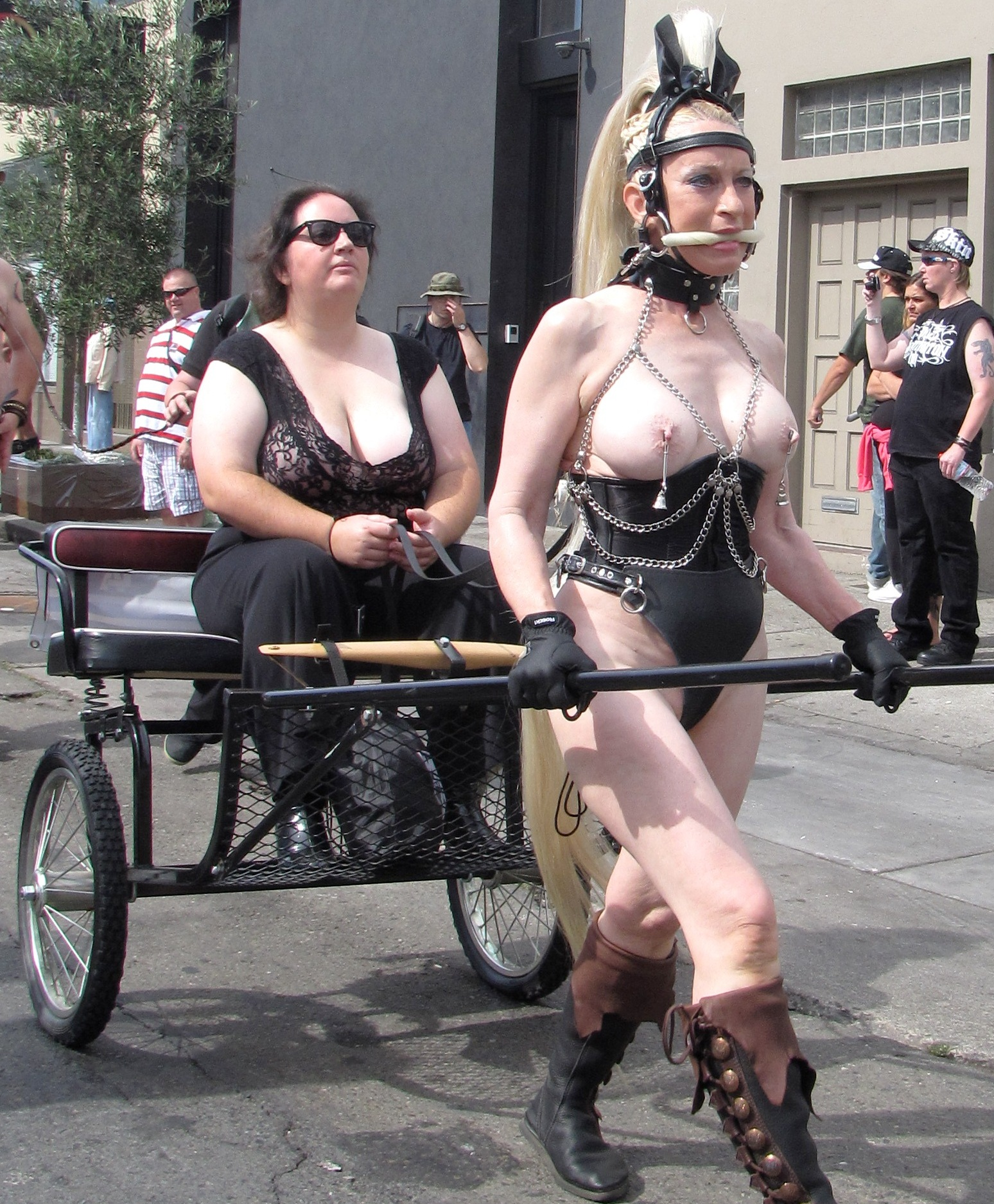
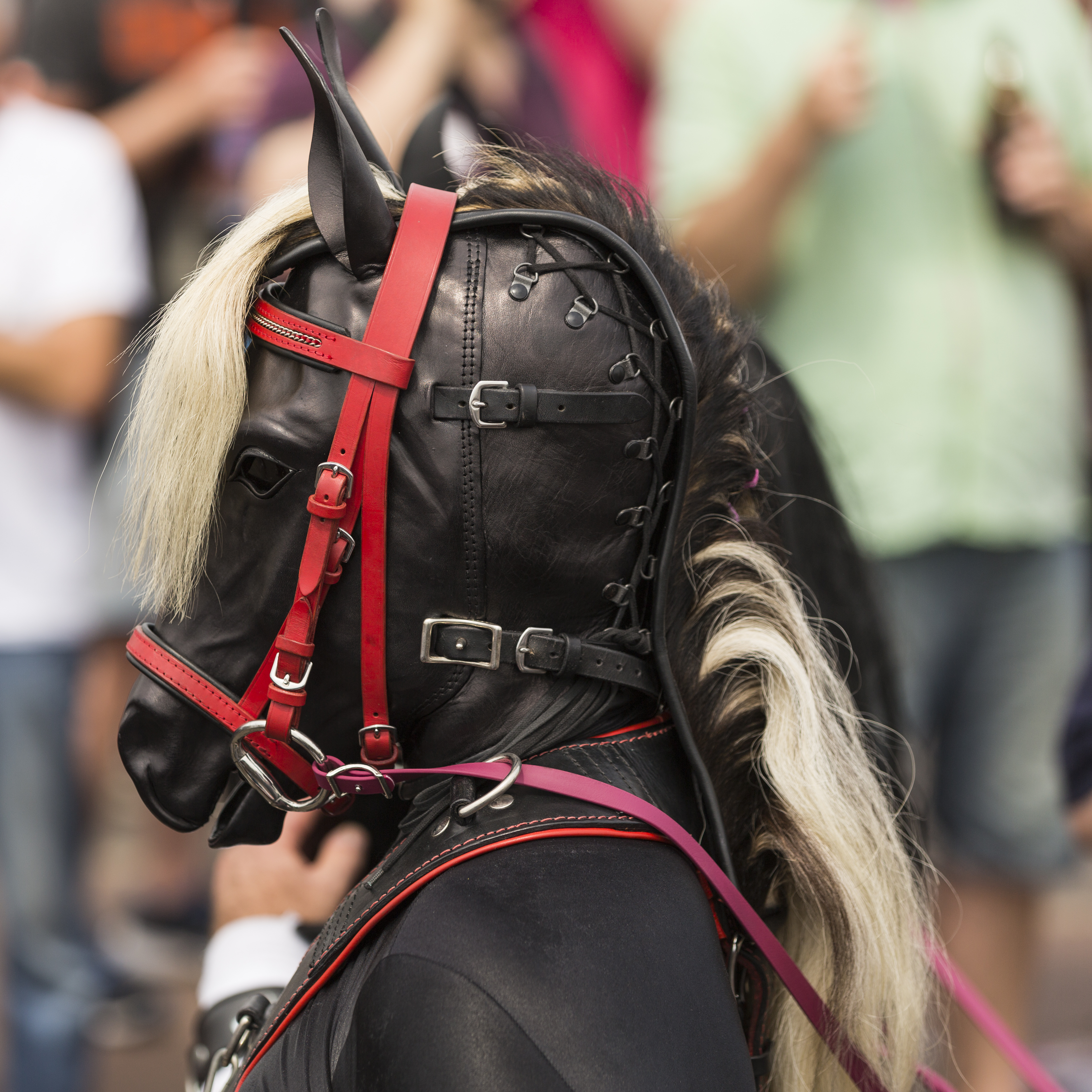
Clockwise from upper left: A woman wearing a head harness and a bit gag · A topless blonde woman pulling a cart carrying another woman at the San Francisco Folsom Street Fair. · A person participating in pony play at Cologne Pride in 2015. · The Pony Pride flag which was created in 2007 by Carrie P.; it uses the color black in solidarity with the leather community.

Pony play is where at least one of the participants dresses to resemble and/or assumes the mannerisms and character of an equine animal. A documentary film Pony Passion was produced by British pony play club De Ferre in 2003 showing their club's activities and the 2005 documentary film, Born in a Barn, depicted the lives of several pony-play enthusiasts.

Pony play may be considered to be depicted in Phyllis and Aristotle, a medieval legend originating in the 13th century where the philosopher Aristotle was persuaded to let a woman named Phyllis ride him like a horse, in promised exchange for sexual favors: an episode depicted in various woodcuts and other works of art.

=== Kitten play ===
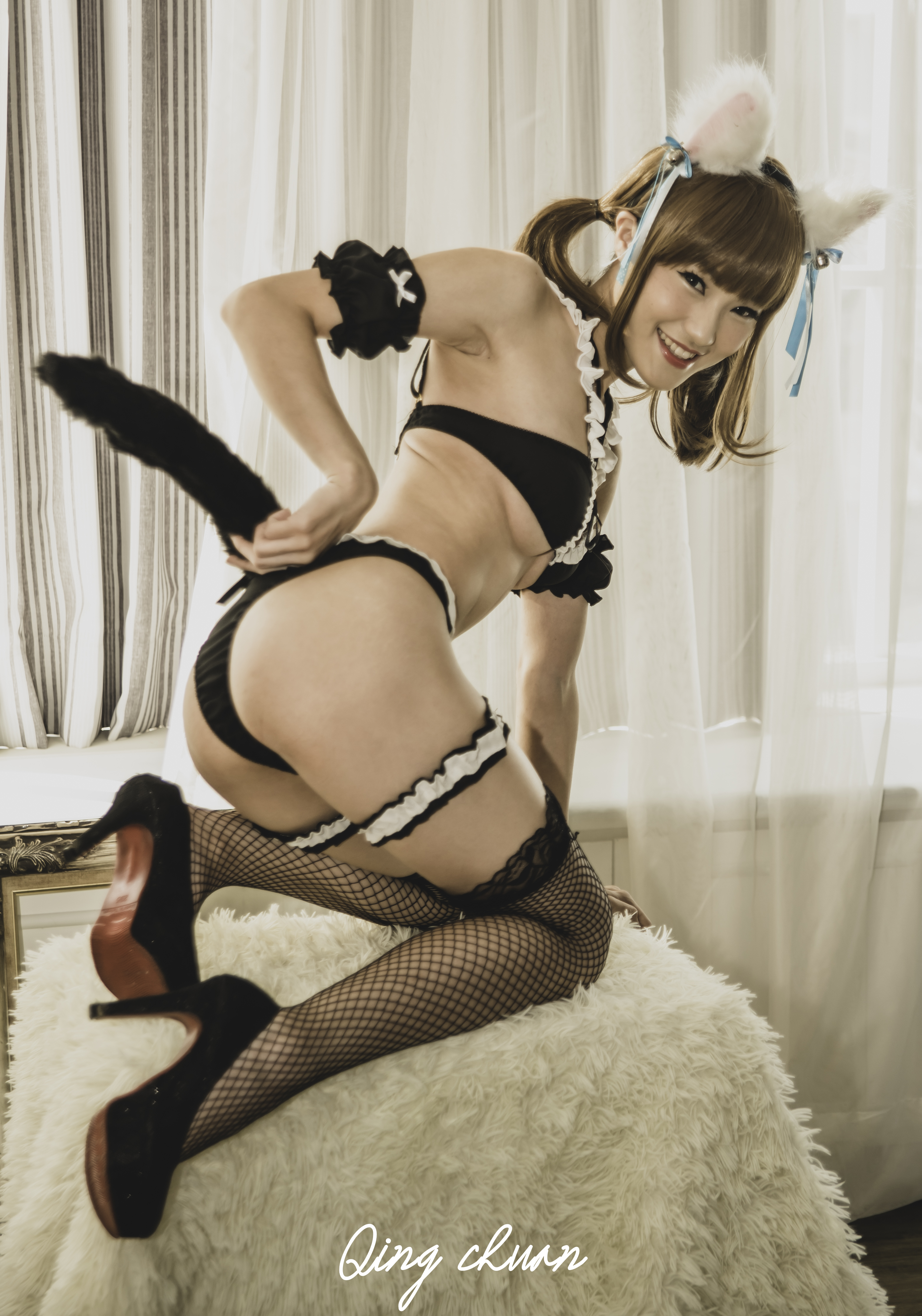
A woman in kitten outfit

In kitten play, a person dresses to resemble and assumes the mannerisms and character of a kitten or cat, a characteristic of which is that it keeps some independence and, as part of the fantasy, might retaliate against the partner trying to tame/train them. Some might be trained to do tricks such as bring toys back, to beg, or go on walks. A "kitten" or "cat" that is unowned or uncollared may be called a "stray".

=== Pup play ===
Pup play is where participants take on the persona of a dog or puppy. It can involve wearing dog-like accessories, such as hoods, mitts, and tails, and acting like a canine. This play can be done alone, with other pups, or with a handler, trainer, or master. Pup play is especially popular in the LGBTQ community.

=== HuCow ===
HuCow participants broadly consider themselves as cows or farmers. The cow is usually submissive and objectified by the farmer. Scenes are often centered around the farmer milking the human cow's breasts. Human cows are often portrayed with large-sized breasts or pecs, as being able to lactate.

== See also ==
- Animal transformation fantasy (disambiguation)
- Cat Girl Manor – Colorado residence known for hosting animal roleplay
- Consent (BDSM) – Facet of BDSM
- Erotic humiliation – Consensual use of humiliation in a sexual context
- Fur fetishism – Sexual fetish relating to particular type of clothing
- Human furniture – Practice in which a person's body is used as furniture
- Master slave relationship – Consensual authority-exchange structured sexual relationship
- Animal roleplay in ancient Rome – Attitudes and behaviors towards sex in ancient Rome
- Sexual roleplay – Sexual and other interactions of people playing type roles
- Zoophilia – Sexual fixation on non-human animals
