= Animal transformation fantasy =

Animal transformation fantasy may refer to:

- Therianthropy, a common element of fantasy fiction that involves transformation into an animal
- Animal roleplay, the act of imagining oneself as an animal
