= Cat Girl Manor =

Colorado residence known for hosting animal roleplay

Cat Girl Manor, also known as The Chateau, was a private residence in El Paso County, Colorado, United States, known for hosting kittenplay. It has been described as "the Playboy Mansion of the kitten play community". The manor has been featured on the Viceland television series Slutever. Some of the "kittens" perform "purrlesque", a variation of burlesque. The Chateau is now exclusively an online magazine known for kittenplay shoots and articles.

== See also ==
- Animal roleplay
- Catgirl
- Playboy Mansion
