= Collars in BDSM =

BDSM neckwear

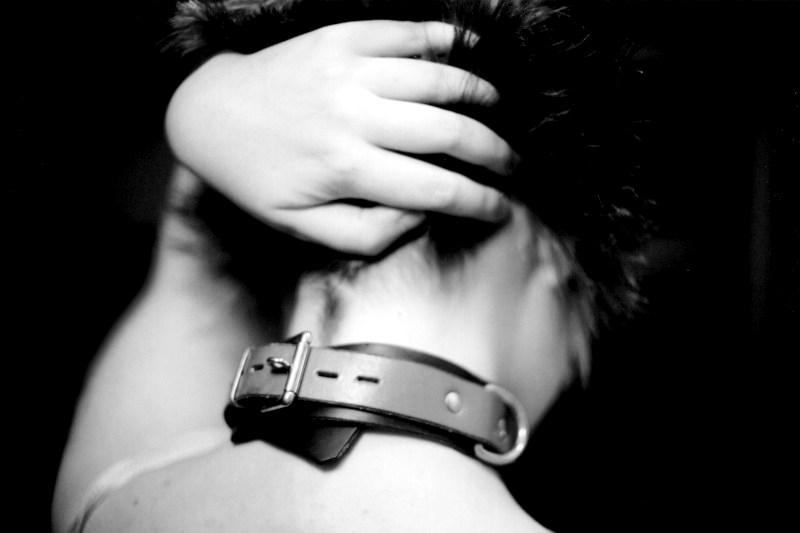
A BDSM-style collar with a D-ring, and buckles in the back.

In BDSM, a collar is a device of any material worn by a person to indicate their submissive, slave or owned pet status in a BDSM relationship. A person wearing a collar to symbolize their relationship with another is said to be collared. Collars are used to signify ownership or connection within a dom/sub relationship. The collar may also be worn by the submissive as a visual indication to others.

Collars come in many forms, from practical leather straps to elegant metal chokers or chains. The choice of collar can reflect the personalities and tastes of the dominant and submissive, as well as the nature of their relationship. For many, wearing a collar is a deeply meaningful act that symbolizes commitment, trust, and the power dynamics between partners.

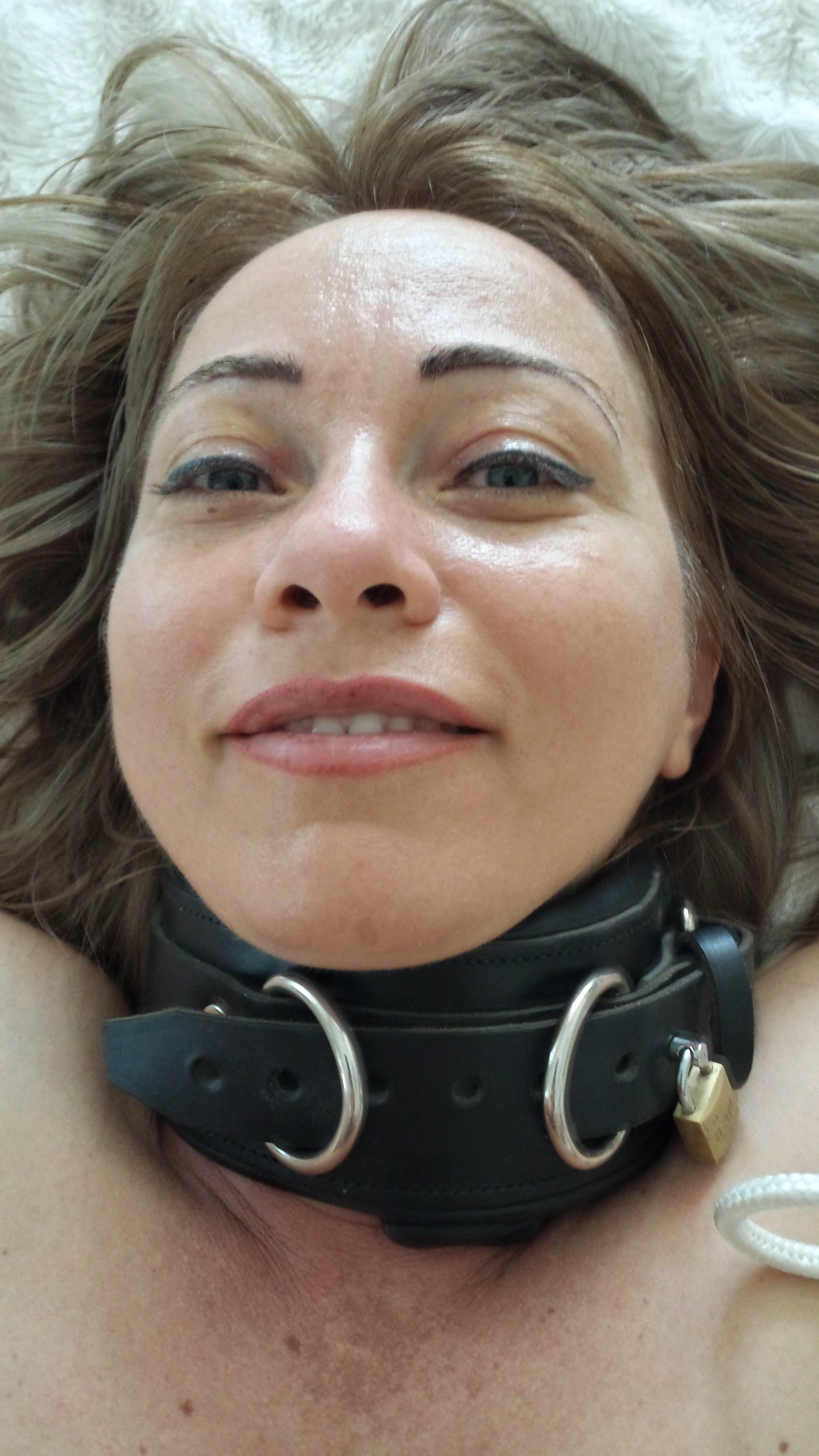
An example of a large BDSM collar with a padlock affixed to prevent easy removal.

Collars are sometimes worn for long periods of time. This could be for sentimental reasons like a locket, or it could be part of the relationship dynamic. In the second example, the submissive might ask the dominant to put the collar on them or the dom might instruct the sub to not take the collar off by themselves or without permission. Putting a collar on someone is called "collaring" and can signify the start of a negotiated BDSM scene or it can be a visual representation of someone being "spoken for" like a wedding band. Some people practice self-collaring to signify their dedication to themselves, disinterest in suitors, or interest in being leashed. Some collars are designed with special spots to affix a padlock or tamper-evident device. Other features include necessitating the use of a special tool like a hex key or security screwdriver to don or doff. These types of collars can be considered permanent jewellery.

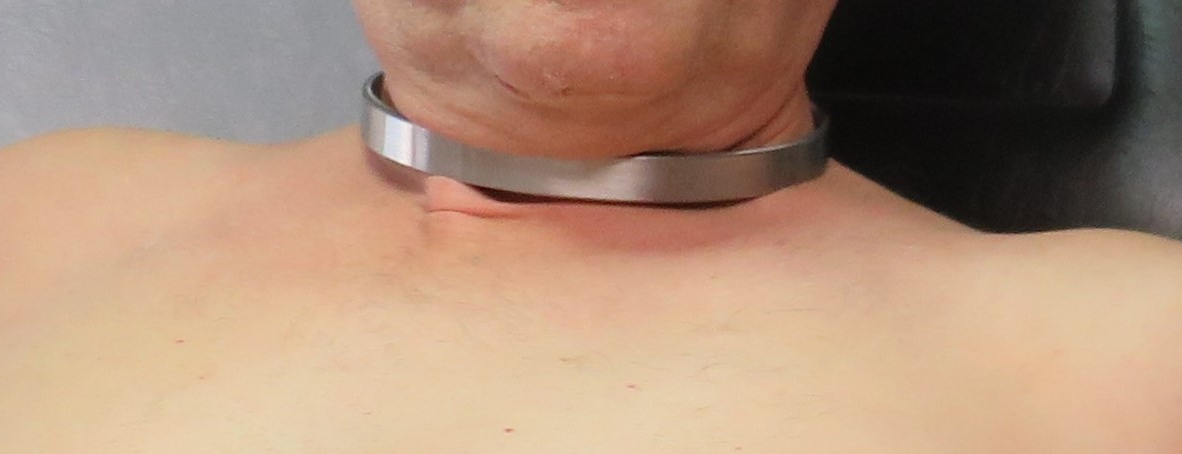
A day collar worn by a male.

Some submissives may wear "day-collars". These are typically items of jewellery (though can be any item of clothing.) The jewellery may, or may not contain an O ring. The jewellery is chosen by the couple and can be completely "Vanilla," or can be obviously a collar. They are frequently used in scenarios in which it would be inappropriate for the submissive to be collared but their dominant wishes for them to be collared.
