= Dominance and submission =

Erotic roleplay involving the submission of one person to another

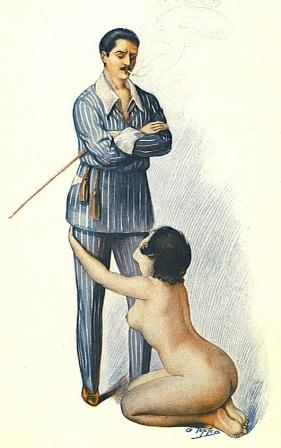
1921 illustration of female submission. The male is clothed while the female is naked and waiting on corporal punishment being administered on her. The art is by Georges Topfer from his work Le rêve d’un flagellant ('The Dream of a Flagellant').

Dominance and submission (D/s) is a set of behaviors, customs, and rituals involving the submission of one person to another in an erotic episode or lifestyle. It is a subset of BDSM. This form of sexual contact and pleasure has been shown to please a minority of people.

Physical contact is not necessary, and D/s can be conducted anonymously over the telephone, email, or other messaging systems. In other cases, it can be intensely physical, sometimes crossing into sadomasochism. In D/s, both parties take pleasure or erotic enjoyment from either dominating or being dominated. Those who take the superior position are called dominants—Doms (regardless of gender) or Dommes (female)—while those who take the subordinate position are called submissive, or subs. A switch is an individual who plays either role. Two switches together may negotiate and exchange roles several times in a session. The term dominatrix usually refers to a female sex worker who dominates others for pay while the term maledom is used for a sexually dominant male in BDSM practices.

== History ==
The dominant–submissive relationship fits within the overarching term BDSM and its lifestyle. BDSM stands for "bondage and discipline" (B&D), "domination and submission" (D&S), and "sadism and masochism" (S&M). Many misconceptions of this relationship and its associated activities come from the fact that early theorists conceptualized that sadomasochism and BDSM behavior were a symptom of psychopathology. It was thought that people who participated in this type of sexual play disregarded safety and consent, which influenced the diagnosis, classification, and perception of this type of relationship. These misconceptions of all participants of BDSM having disordered tendencies have related to the definition and criteria for sadomasochism in the DSM-5. Therefore, many in the BDSM community do not fit the criteria.

It is possible that this community of BDSM participants was formed in the early 18th century, and maybe even before. For example, the dominant–submissive partnership has been shown in early versions of the Kama Sutra. Not only is it shown in literature but also in the actions of ancient rulers that would participate in sexually sadistic torture, role play, and finally the assertion of their dominance over subjects. Their actions show severe sadomasochism as well as the early-onset behaviors of the community.

The relationship between a dominant and submissive revolves around consent and guidelines. Within the world of BDSM, consent is a core focus and requirement because it is what separates sexual sadism from coercive sexual sadism disorder in the DSM-5. Sexual sadism disorder and sexual masochism disorder have been changed in order to differentiate between consensual and non consensual partners. As well as meeting the new criteria to be classified as one or the other, for example, the person being diagnosed must be experiencing personal distress about their paraphilia rather than distress coming from society's disapproval. The growth of dominant and submissive behavior, sadomasochism, and other BDSM activity is evident through its history, from ancient times through the separation from disorder to consensual-community participant.

== Overview ==
Dominance and submission have a long history in human culture and civilization. In human sexuality, this has broadened to include voluntarily chosen roles and activities that express dominance and submission. The proportion of the population which partakes in D/s activities is difficult to ascertain as the statistics vary widely depending on the particular study, date of publication, and country where the research has taken place.

A 1985 study suggested that about 30 percent of participants in BDSM activities are females, and the rest are males. A study by the California Graduate Institute in 2008 found that 61 percent of men were exclusively or mainly dominant (26 percent were exclusively or mainly submissive), while 69 percent of women were exclusively or mainly submissive (30 percent were exclusively or mainly dominant).

A study in 2008 found that only 2.2% of men and 1.3% of women had participated in a BDSM activity in the previous year. In 2017, a Belgian study of BDSM interest in the general population, with a sample size of 1,027, found that 46.8% of the total sample had ever performed at least one BDSM-related activity. An additional 22% had fantasized about it, and 12.5% performed at least one BDSM-related activity on a regular basis.

A 2019 publication states that a minority of the population engages or fantasizes about BDSM activity. A national study with 2,800 participants showed that about 14% of men and 11% of women had participated in some sort of BDSM related activity and from those results, it was concluded that approximately 10% of adults have joined in some part of the sexual behavior.

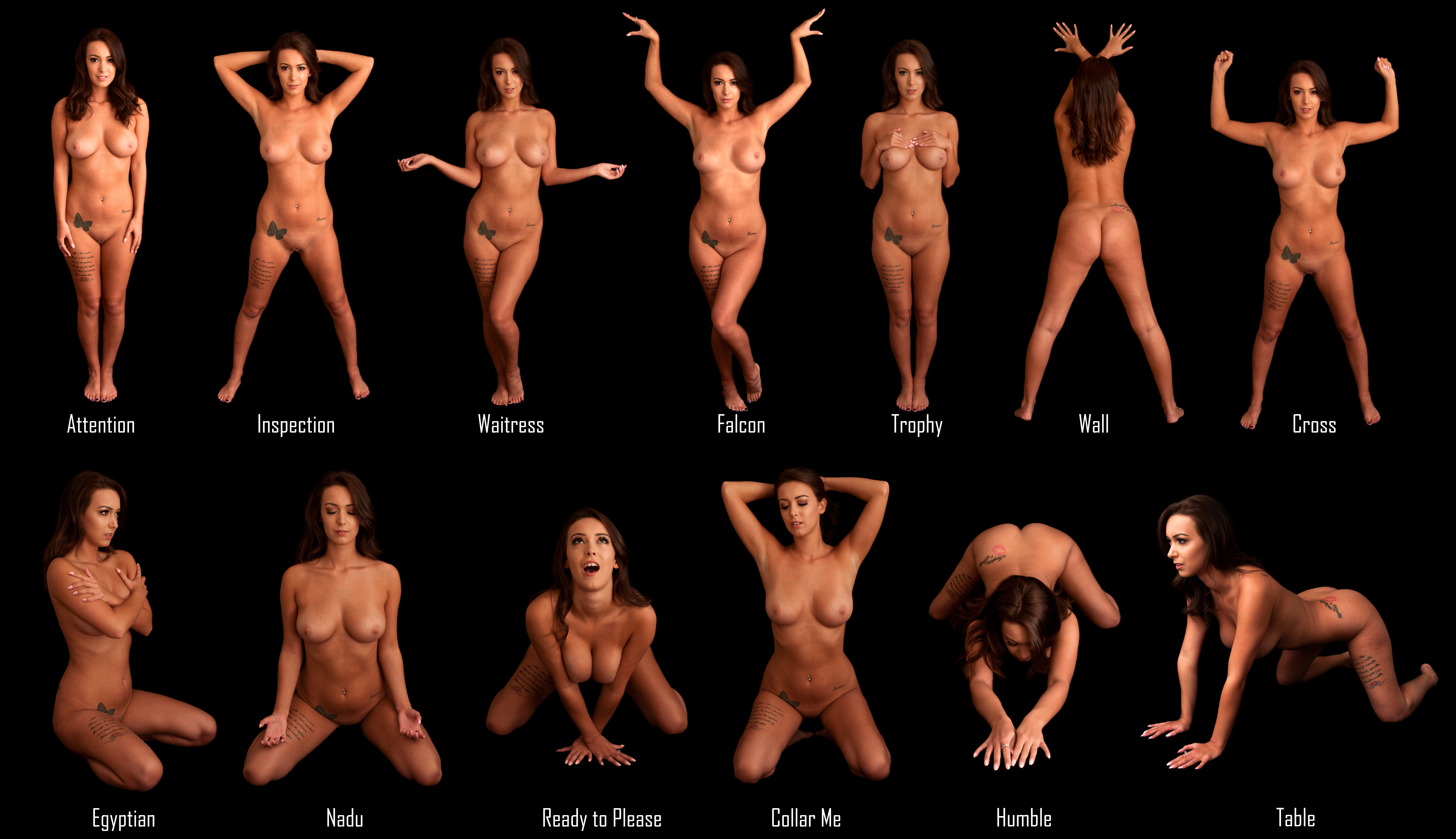
Different types of submissive poses

A safeword is usually given to the submissive partner to prevent the dominant from overstepping physical and emotional boundaries. It is usually a code word, series of code words or other signal used to communicate physical or emotional state, typically when approaching, or crossing, a boundary. Safewords can have differing levels of urgency - some may bring a scene to an outright stop, whereas others may indicate that a boundary is being approached. A safeword may be used by the Dominant as well as the Submissive if they feel things have gone too far and are uncomfortable continuing.

D/s may be ritualized or freeform. It is usually a negotiated lifestyle, with people discussing their wishes, limits, and needs in order to find commonality. A D/s relationship may be sexual or non-sexual, long- or short-term, and intimate or anonymous. Most adherents search for the essential intensity, trust, and intimacy that are required to make any deep relationship possible.

== Terminology ==
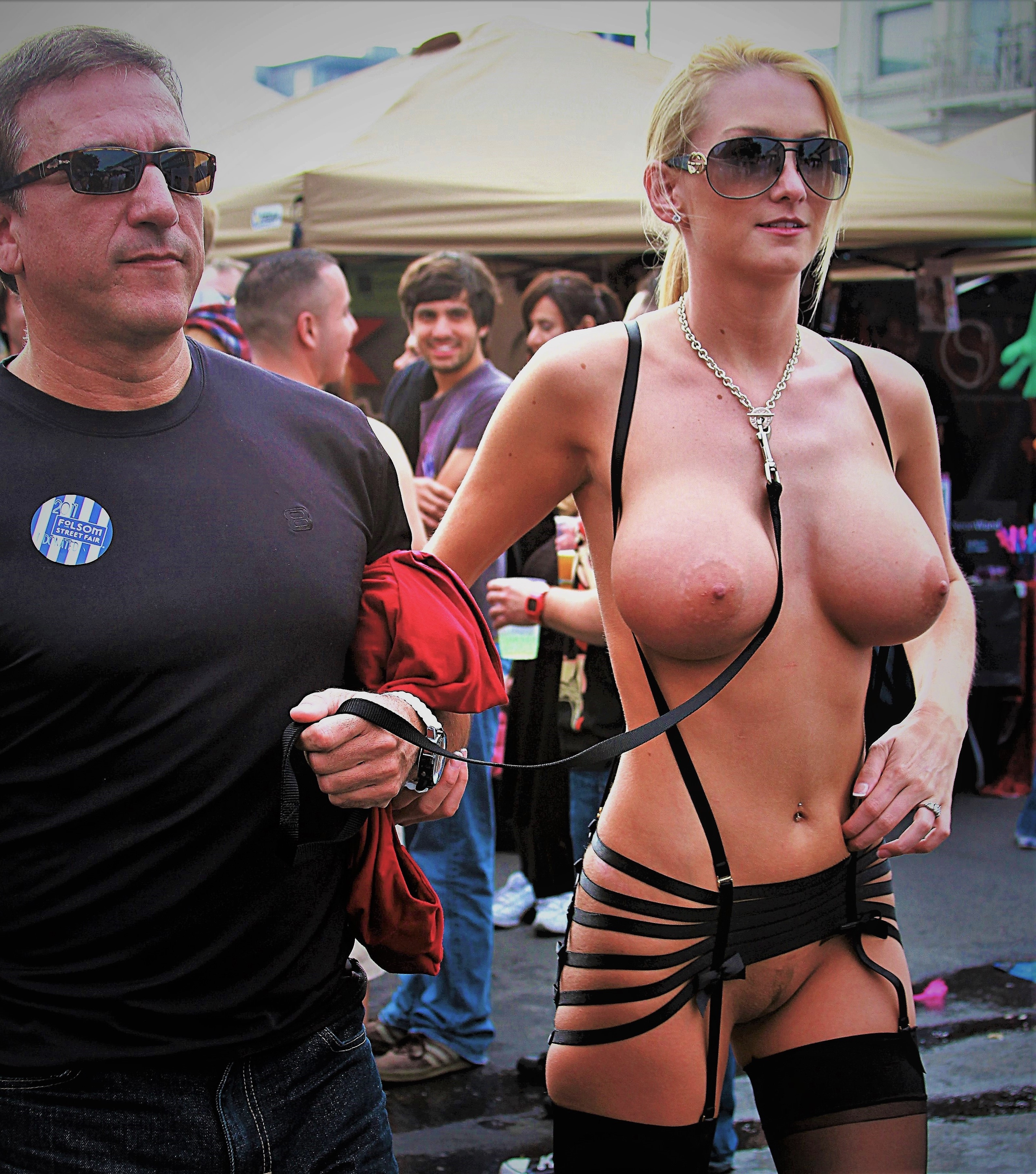
A dominant male publicly parades a nude submissive female using leash tied to her, Folsom Street Fair, 2013

BDSM is the sexual practices of bondage and pain/torture, dominant and submissive, as well as sadomasochism.

D/s participants often refer to their activity as "play", with an individual play session being called a "scene". In addition to "dominant" and "submissive" a "switch" is a person who can take either role. The dominant and submissive relations pertain to two people who play with psychological, emotional, and/or physical dominance. Most of the time in sexual relationships like this there is some sort of power exchange through their physical interaction. A scene between two switches can involve trading off the dominant and submissive roles, possibly several times. In contrast, the terms top and bottom refer to the active (agent) and passive (patient) roles, respectively. In a given scene, there is no requirement that the dominant also be the top, or that the submissive be the bottom, although this is often the case.

The term vanilla refers to normative ("non-kinky") sex and relationships, the vanilla world being mainstream society outside of the BDSM subculture. The term comes from vanilla ice cream being considered the "default" flavor.

The term power exchange refers to the empowerment of the dominant by the submissive's surrender to his/ her control. Power exchange is consensual and in reality, it is the submissive that has the underlying control during the relationship exchange. The dominant is attempting to satisfy the submissive's kinks and desires.

The terms top and bottom are used as verbs or nouns to describe the physical play of SM but with less of a focus of the "sadist" and "masochist" part of the activity. They can be used as synonyms for dominant and submissive.

The term dungeon is used as a reference to a space/room designated for sadomasochism play. It can also be used to describe a club where these activities take place. It can also be a place to practice kinks safely and learn how to carry out activities and play.

The term dungeon monitors is used as a description of well-trusted BDSM members that volunteer to monitor dungeons and look out for infractions, distress, or any other form of misconduct or non-consent.

The term flogger is used to describe a tool or whip used in sexual scenes. The action of flogging refers to impact play. Usually made of leather with a hard handle and multiple long flat strands attached. The term can also be used to describe the person holding the specialized whip.

=== Linguistic conventions ===
Some people in the D/s world capitalize words and names that refer to dominants, and do not capitalize those that refer to submissives, hence the capitalization of D/s; others do not. It was popularized in internet chatrooms, to make it easier to identify the orientation of the writer or the person being written about.

Also, some submissives eschew personal pronouns, instead referring to themselves as "this slave" or "Master Bob's girl". This is sometimes considered an expression of modesty, but it is an entirely optional method of depersonalizing a submissive during "play". It may have roots in the military, where new recruits are required to refer to themselves as "this recruit", rather than "I" or "me".

== D/s relationship styles ==
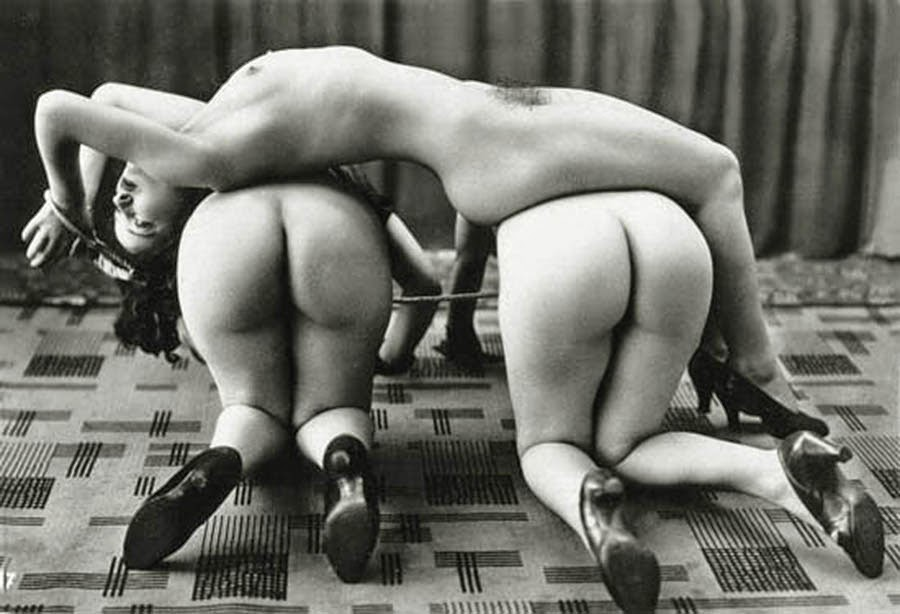
Human furniture: A naked submissive woman being used as a decorative table. She is required to stay in the same posture, such that the vase on her back does not fall (top). A human-table formed using three naked submissive women (bottom).

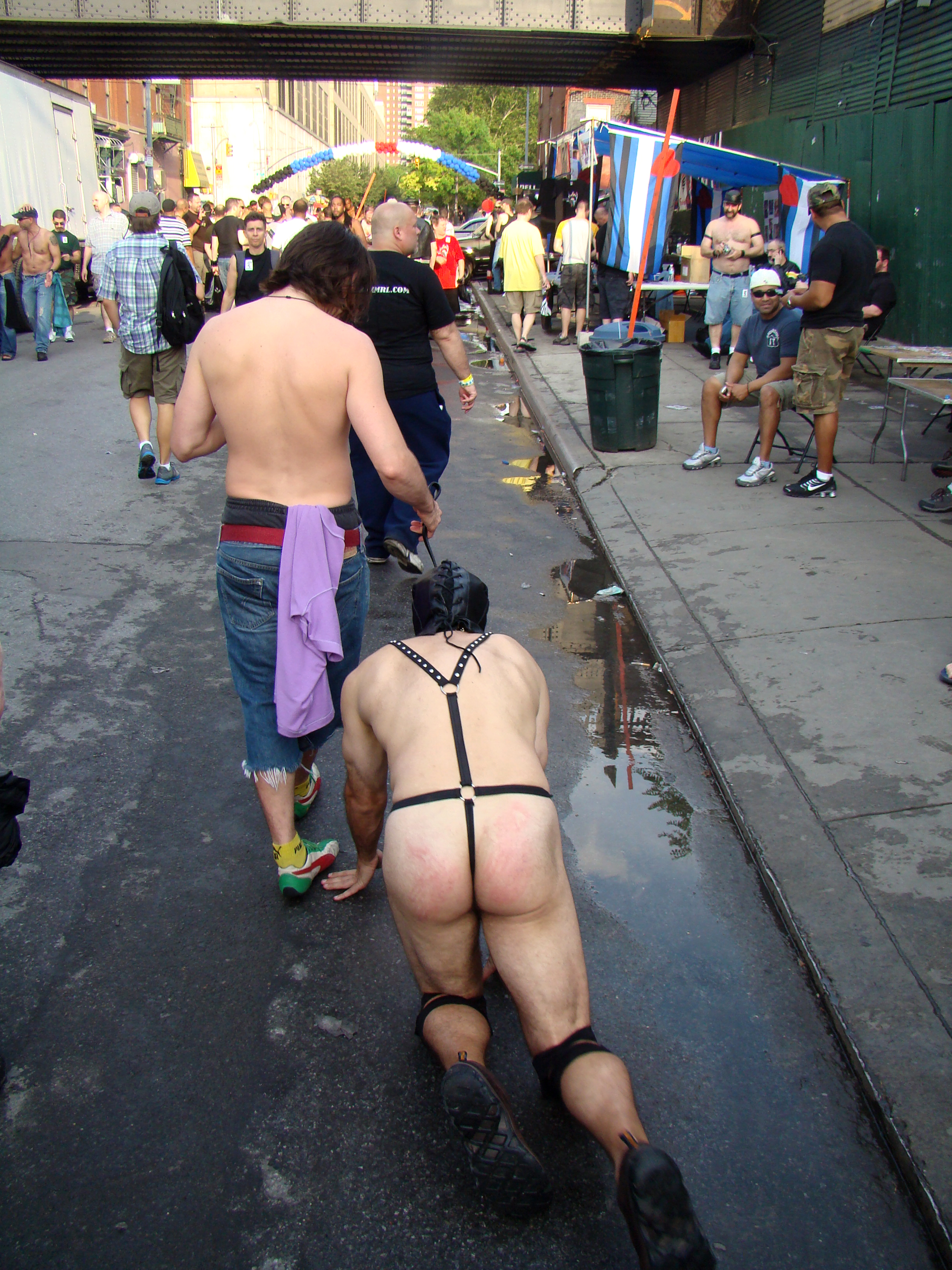
A man engaging in petplay at the Folsom Street Fair and wearing a dog leash around his neck.

There can be any number of partners in a D/s relationship: one dominant may have several submissives, who may in turn dominate others, or a submissive may have multiple dominants. Relationships may be monogamous or polyamorous. Romantic love is not necessarily a feature in D/s: partners might be very much in love or have no romantic relationship at all. Some D/s relationships are sexual, others completely chaste.

Fantasy role play can be an element, with partners taking classic dominant or submissive roles, or classic authority-figure roles such as teacher and student, police officer and suspect, or parent and child. Animal play, where one partner takes the role of owner or caretaker and the other takes the part of a pet or animal, can also be D/s play.

A classic example of a D/s role is the "sissy" maid, where an adult male dresses in cartoonish female clothing and performs stereotypical female chores such as housecleaning or serving tea. Cross-dressing in D/s does not always involve a desire to be sissified or made into caricatures of women or to serve: for example, others may desire to be made as beautiful as possible and interact on a "girlfriend-to-girlfriend" non-sexual basis.

Variation in D/s is virtually limitless and the activities take many forms, and may be combined with other forms of BDSM. These variations may include:

- professional – Dominatrix (femdom)
- Maledom
- resistance play – forcing the submissive to do something against their will as an intense form of power play
- domestic servitude or consensual slavery
- enforced chastity of the submissive
- sexual slavery
- fetishes – such as foot fetish, boot worship, uniforms, smoking, latex and other items can be fetishes.
- humiliation (breast humiliation for its size and shape, clitoris and labia size humiliation, humiliation for not having curvy or big buttocks and hips, small penis humiliation, verbal humiliation)
- dehumanization (e.g., pony, puppy or animal roleplay)
- objectification (human furniture): (e.g., submissive's body used as footstool, or sub's mouth used as spitting bowl and cigarette ashtray)
- cross-dressing
- whipping
- corporal punishment
- trampling
- human toilet – golden showers
- cuckquean
- feminization
- cuckold
- bondage (sexual)
- public humiliation

== Safety ==
There are some risks commonly associated with D/s concerning both physical and mental health. Some examples are:

- Physical health complications such as bruising, broken skin, nerve damage due to tight bondage, burns due to hot wax play, or blood-borne pathogen exposure during needle play.
- In rare cases, death may occur when the participants engage in activities that have the potential to cause serious physical injury. The most common activity associated with accidental death is erotic strangulation. A study by Bunzel et al. showed that between 1993 and 2017 more death occurred from auto-erotic activities than from partnered activities, and men were more likely to die in both cases than women.
- Negative emotional states during or after partaking in D/s activities

== Consent and contracts ==
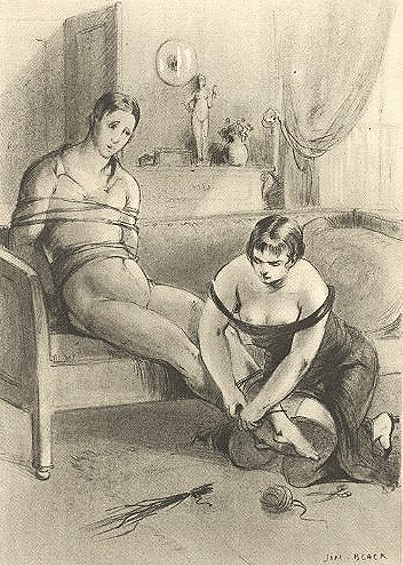
Artwork depicting a female dominant performing bondage on her male submissive

Consent is a vital element in all psychological play, and consent can be granted in many ways. Some employ a written form known as a "Dungeon negotiation form", for others a simple verbal commitment is sufficient. Consent can be limited both in duration and content. There are many versions of consent, but mainly it is the knowledge between the partnership of who plays the dominant role and who plays the submissive. The commitment of knowing who afflicts and receives the pain, bondage, torture, and/or humiliation. As well as the fact that all erotic experiences are performed in a safe, legal, and consensual practice as well as benefiting both parties. The consensual practice is what helps distinguish BDSM participants from a psychiatric diagnosis of a sexual disorder. The community of BDSM has adopted the saying "Safe, Sane, Consensual" (SSC) and "Risk-Aware Consensual Kink" (RACK) and a new addition "Caring, Communication, Consent, and Caution" (4Cs). Consent has also been categorized into three groups: surface, scene, and deep consent. Surface consent has been defined as a simple yes or no. Scene consent has been described as including parameters of a top/ bottom negotiation and agreement of a play scene. Deep consent involves the mental capacity of the bottom (submissive) and the awareness of the top that the bottom is able to use a safeword. The BDSM community have a simple code of conduct concerning the boundaries of safety and negotiation to ensure consensual BDSM.

Negotiation in terms of the sexual scenes is required to ensure that the BDSM play is enjoyable and safe for both parties involved. The discussion of what activities are available and the mutual definition of the play is the only way both the dominant and submissive will be able to comfortably perform. There is a complexity to negotiation depending on the trust and emotional attachment the partners have towards each other; the more familiarity between the two the less negotiation needed. The extent of negotiation depends on the partner's involvement, for example, less risk behavior the less negotiation needed.

Safewords are verbal codes both partners can recognize as the end or altering of activities done in a BDSM scene. It is an important asset to continue the consent through the relationship and scene itself. The use of a safeword at any time, regardless of the intensity of the scene, usually signifies the end to a scene, or activity and possible withdrawal of consent completely. Within the community of BDSM, there are universal safewords used according to traffic lights and known as "house safewords". Red means stop everything, yellow means slow down and to not go any further, and green meaning go and continue with more intensity. There are also possibilities where speaking is not an option and so there are "silent safewords" that are simple gestures that represent stopping an activity, for example, clapping hands, snapping fingers, or any action showing the scene must end. The use of safewords and the abode of them go hand and hand with consent and negotiation. All of it ensures a safe space where both participants are able to enjoy the sexual play.

The BDSM community takes consent very seriously and promotes safe play. They provide many resources so people may learn how to respect consent, such as education, information, and safety. They also provide public playrooms with dungeon monitors to make sure the rules are kept and followed. They have consequences for people who break the built trust and disobey the rule of consent and boundaries. Some punishments include being blacklisted from the community and labeled as a "predator." Being blacklisted includes being personally ridiculed by individual members, as well as exclusion from play parties, clubs, and organizations held by the community.

Although they take all the precautions to the events, coercion and sexual assault still occur inside and outside the community. There are many forms to this that include knowingly violating consent, accidental violations, and misunderstandings from the lack of communication towards definitions and agreed-upon activities. The National Coalition for Sexual Freedom (NCSF) is an educational organization that is driven to propose positive and safe sex that was founded in 1997. They conducted a survey with 4,598 participants in BDSM, and 1,307 of them reported being touched without consent. Out of the participants, 26% reported they were attacked by a predator and 33% said they were coerced. 81% of the sample said that during the activity they wanted it to stop. It is important to include that participants of BDSM are not more likely to be coerced or sexually assaulted, there is no significant relationship between the two. That being said just because someone participates in a dominant and submissive relationship does not mean they will eventually be sexually assaulted or coerced.

Consensual non-consensuality is a mutual agreement to act as if consent has been waived within safe, sane limits. It is an agreement that consent is given in advance, sometimes without foreknowledge of the exact actions planned, though within defined limits subject to a safeword, reasonable care, common sense, or other restrictions. The consent is given with the intent of its being irrevocable under normal circumstances. As such, it is a show of extreme trust and understanding and is usually undertaken only by partners who know each other well, or otherwise agree to set clear, safe limits on their activities.

It is not unusual to grant consent only for an hour or for an evening. When a scene lasts for more than a few hours, it is common to draft a "scene contract" that defines what will happen and who is responsible for what. It is a good way to work out what all the parties want and usually improves the experience. Some contracts can become quite detailed and run for many pages, especially if a scene is to last a weekend or more.

For long term consent, a "slave contract" may be drawn up. Slave contracts are simply a way for consenting adults to define the nature of their relationship and clarify personal boundaries, and are not intended to carry legal force.

After a slave contract is drafted, some celebrate the event with a "collaring ceremony", in which the local D/s community is invited to witness the commitment made in the document. Some ceremonies become quite elaborate, and can be as involved as a wedding or any similar ritual.

== Equipment and accessories ==
Some people maintain a special room or area, called a dungeon or playroom, that contains special equipment, such as shackles, handcuffs, whips, queening stools, and spanking benches or a Berkley horse, for example, used for play scenes, or they may visit a BDSM club that maintains such facilities.

=== Collars ===
Many submissives in a submissive relationship wear a collar to indicate their submissive status and commitment. It can be much like a wedding band, except that only the submissive partner wears one. The traditional collar is a neck band in leather or metal, chosen, designed, and even crafted by the dominant partner. Some subs may wear a "symbolic collar", often a bracelet or ankle chain, which is more subdued than the traditional collar and can pass in non-BDSM situations. It is not uncommon for a sub to have several collars for special occasions. Collars are integral for animal roleplay.

Many people—for example, some in the punk rock and goth subcultures—wear collars for other reasons, such as fashion. So, one cannot assume that all people wearing collars are involved in BDSM. Members of the furry fandom may also wear collars as a part of costuming or as fashion. Use of collars in the sexual aspects of furry lifestyle may or may not be connected to BDSM, depending on the individual's preferences.

=== Chastity Devices ===
In some case, a male submissive may also wear a chastity device to demonstrate their submission and devotion to their dominant. A chastity device renders such as a cock cage prevents both infidelity or masturbation. They can range from simple leather or plastic to stainless steel.

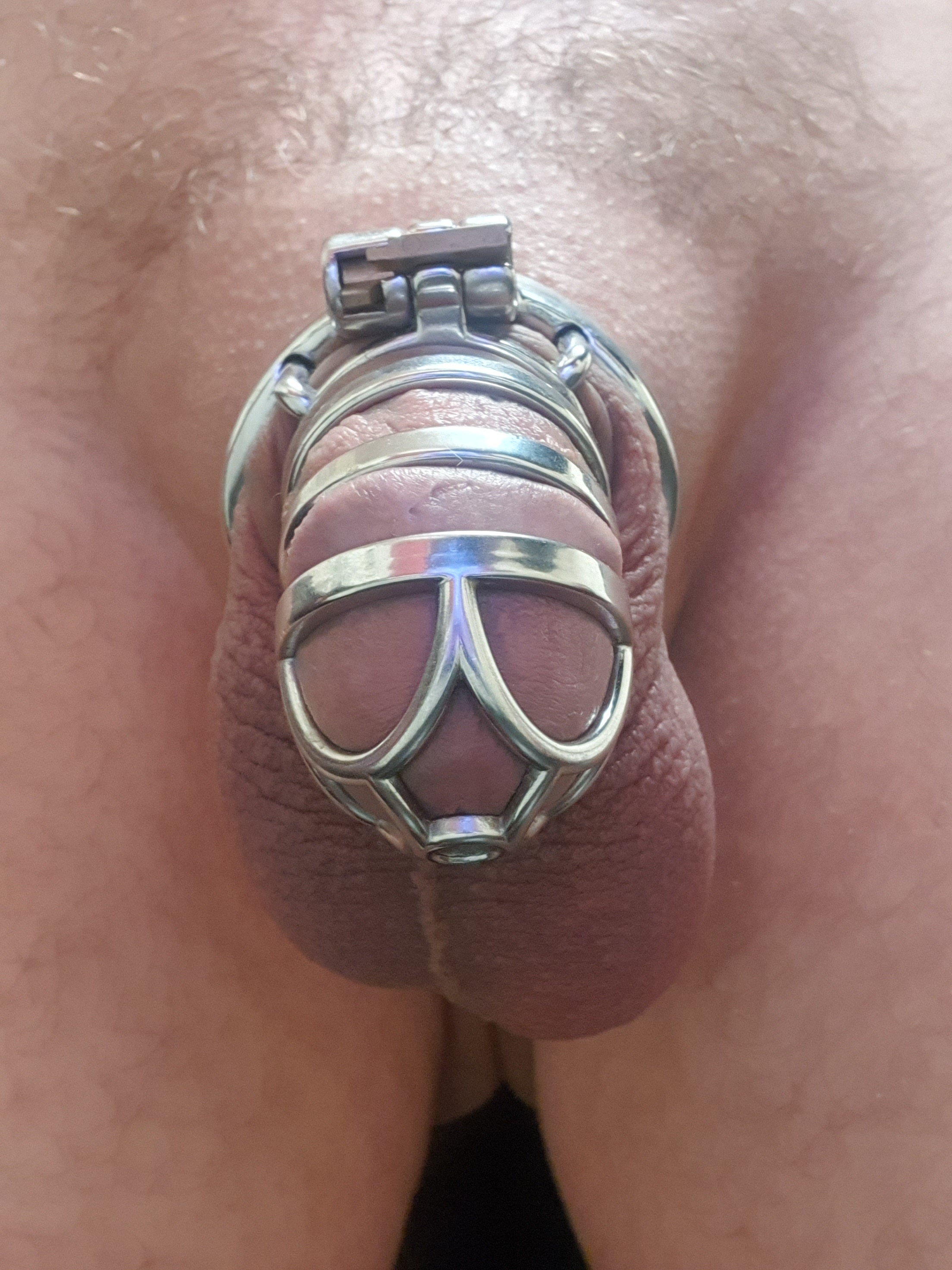

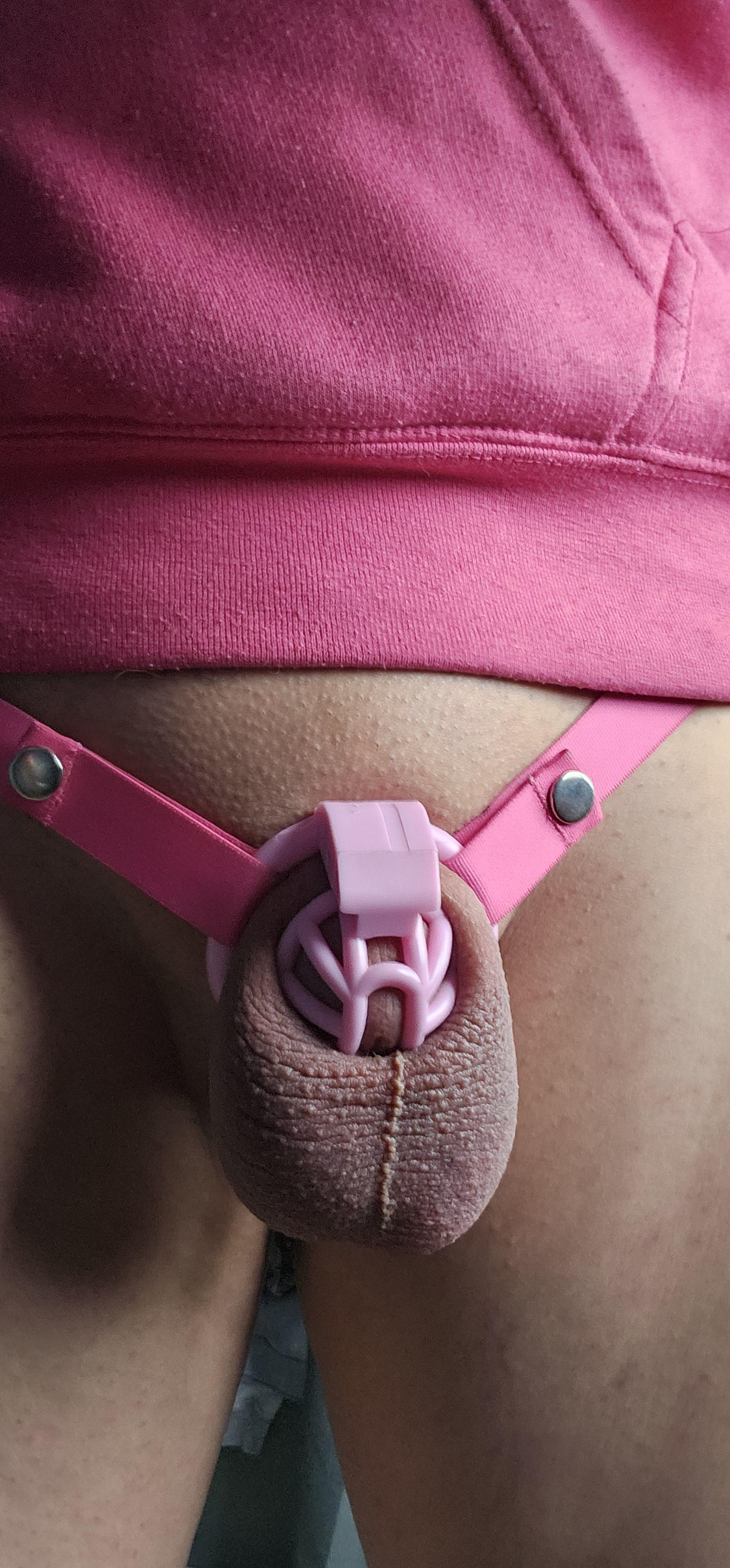

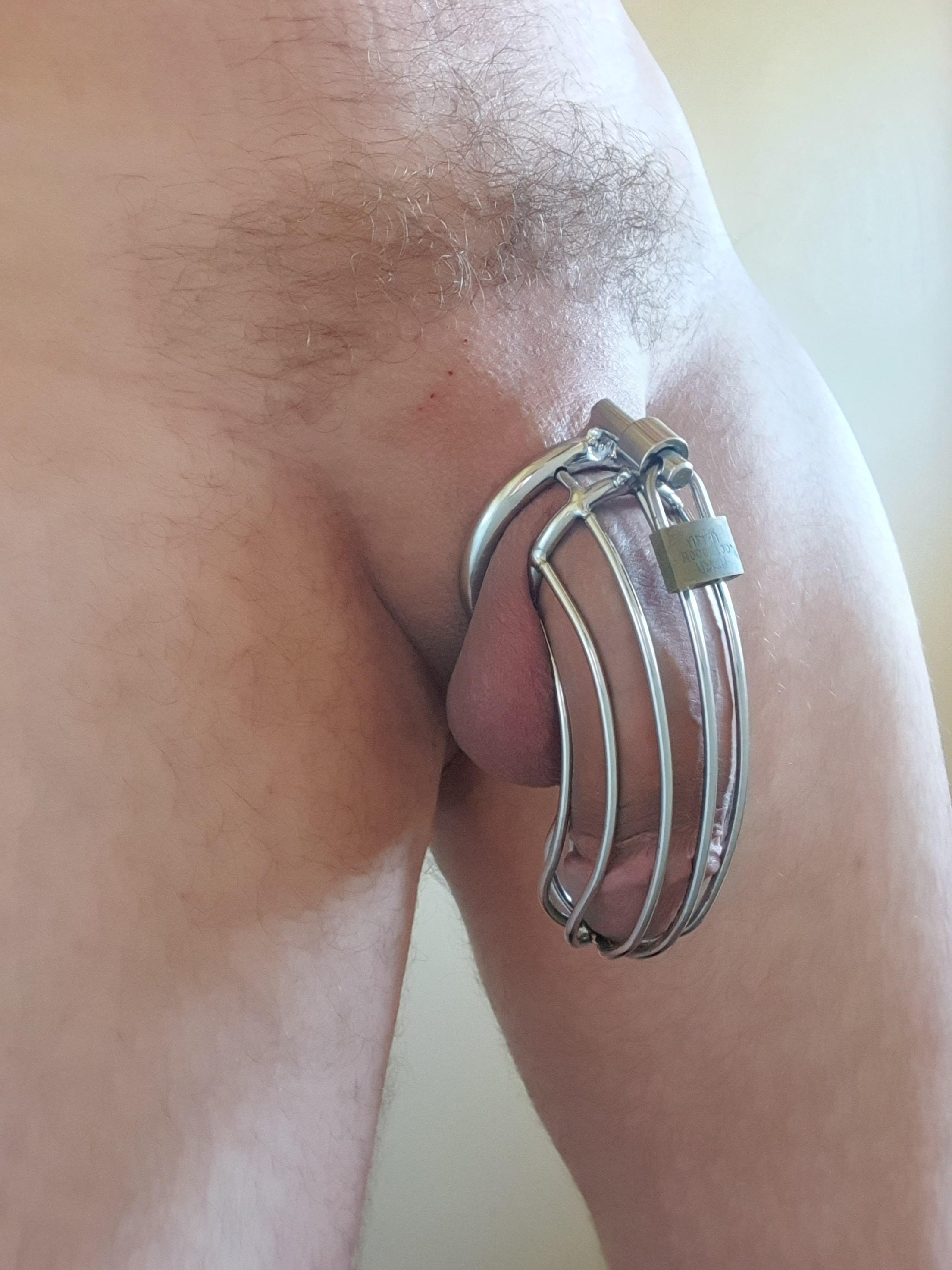

== Art and culture ==
=== Literature ===
One of the most famous works in this area is Leopold von Sacher-Masoch's Venus im Pelz (Venus in Furs, 1869), in which the protagonist, Severin, persuades a woman, Wanda, to take him on as her slave, serves her, and allows her to degrade him. The book has elements of both social and physical submission, and is the genesis of the term "masochism" coined by the 19th-century psychiatrist Krafft-Ebing.

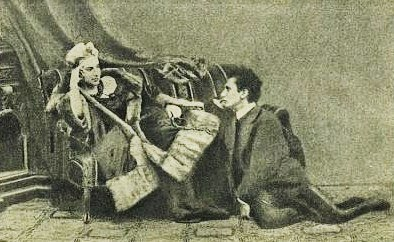
Leopold von Sacher-Masoch and Fanny Pistor (Baroness Bogdanoff)

==== Classic writers ====
- Marquis de Sade
- Leopold von Sacher-Masoch

==== Fiction writers ====
- Arthur Adamov
- Laura Antoniou
- Jacqueline Carey
- E. L. James
- Elfriede Jelinek
- Anaïs Nin
- John Norman
- Pauline Réage
- Anne Rice
- Cecilia Tan
- Larry Townsend

==== Non-fiction writers ====
- Gloria G. Brame
- Patrick Califia
- Dossie Easton
- Janet Hardy
- Jay Wiseman

=== Music ===
- The Rolling Stones song "Under my Thumb" (Mick Jagger, 1966) is supposedly about a D/s relationship.
- The Velvet Underground's song "Venus in Furs" (1967) is based on Sacher-Masoch's novel and discusses sadomasochism, the character Severin, and common bondage practices in a detached, objective, and non-judgmental manner.
- Depeche Mode's song "Master and Servant" (1984) depicts a master and servant relationship.
- The Green Day song "All By Myself/Dominated Love Slave" (written and sung by Tré Cool, 1994) describes Cool's feelings for female dominance.
- The Rihanna song "S&M" (2010) denotes the artist's arousal in BDSM play.
- Dwele's "Obey" (2012) is a neo soul song based on the mind of a Dominant in a D/s relationship.
- The Run The Jewels song "Love Again (Akinyele Back)" is a 2014 hip-hop release with verses about sexual dominance by Killer Mike, El-P and Gangsta Boo.
- The AKB48 song "Juujun na Slave" (2014) describes the singer's role as the submissive in a lesbian relationship.
- The DNCE song "Be Mean" (2016) is written about the artist's desire to be dominated.
- The KPOP group VIXX is known for its BDSM-inspired album Chained Up.
- The Blue Öyster Cult song "Dominance and Submission" suggests sexual interaction to take place in the back of a vehicle, the singer conflicting between dominating or submitting

=== Films ===
- Venus in Furs (1967) Directed by Joseph Marzano (written by Joseph Marzano, Leopold von Sacher-Masoch). A submissive (masochist) discovers (or creates) a reluctant Sadist. Long, examining scenes depicting what is for the submissive to wait in solitude or in transitory. Sadist gives the masochist the "ultimate gift" in the end.
- The Night Porter (1974) Directed by Liliana Cavani. Thirteen years after WWII a concentration camp survivor and her tormentor, currently the night porter at a Vienna hotel, meet again and fall back into their sado-masochistic relationship.
- 9½ Weeks (1986) Directed by Adrian Lyne. Based on a book by the same name. Popular for its "You Can Leave Your Hat On" scene.
- Body of Evidence (1993) Directed by Uli Edel. A woman on trial for murdering a submissive lover is lusted after by her lawyer, who she manipulates, sexually dominates and humiliates.
- Preaching to the Perverted (1997) Directed by Stuart Urban. A female dominant/Dominatrix movie depicting the London S&M scene.
- Secretary (2002) Directed by Steven Shainberg. Widely regarded as the first mainstream film to depict D/s relationship issues.
- Verfolgt (2006) A German film directed by Angelina Maccarone about a sadomasochistic femdom relationship between a probation officer and her client, sixteen-year-old delinquent Jan.
- Venus in Fur (2013) A femdom themed movie, directed by Roman Polanski, and based on the play of the same name by David Ives. An actress comes to audition for a play with the director. As the audition progresses, she escalates her discussion with the direction into an act of psychological and erotic domination, ultimately directing him to act and punishing him for his behavior.
- The Duke of Burgundy (2014) Directed by Peter Strickland. A woman who studies butterflies and moths tests the limits of her relationship with her lover.
- Fifty Shades of Grey (2015) Directed by Sam Taylor-Johnson with a screenplay by Kelly Marcel, based on the novel of the same name by E. L. James.
- Sanctuary (2022) An American dark comedy psychological thriller film directed by Zachary Wigon from a screenplay by Micah Bloomberg. Hal (Christopher Abbott) attempts to end his secret relationship with dominatrix Rebecca (Margaret Qualley).
- Babygirl (2024) Written, directed, and produced by Halina Reijn. The film stars Nicole Kidman as a high-powered CEO who puts her career and family on the line when she begins an affair with a much younger intern (Harris Dickinson).

== See also ==
- Dominatrix
- Dominance hierarchy
- Erotic humiliation
- Master/slave (BDSM)
- Salirophilia
- Sexual fetishism
- Sexual roleplay
- Top, bottom, switch (BDSM)
- Universities with BDSM clubs

Based on gender of the dominant or submissive:

- Female dominance
- Female submission
- Male dominance
- Male submission
