= Master/slave (BDSM) =

Consensual authority-exchange structured sexual relationship

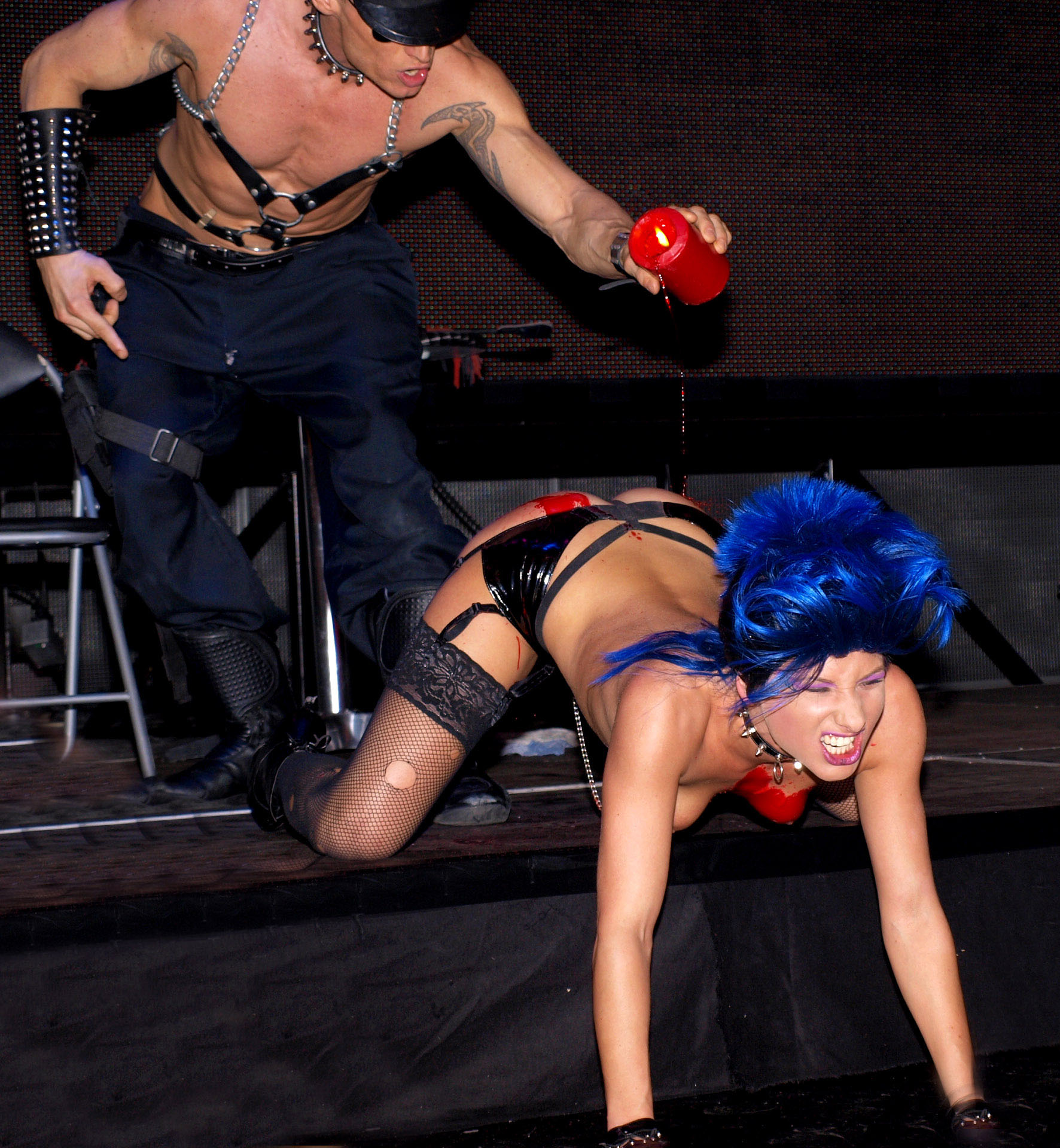
A maledom dripping hot wax onto the buttocks of a woman whose breast is already covered in wax, at Eros Pyramide 2009

In BDSM, Master/slave, M/s or sexual slavery is a relationship in which one individual serves another in a consensual authority-exchange structured relationship. Unlike Dominant/submissive structures found in BDSM in which love is often the core value, service and obedience are often the core values in Master/slave structures. The participants may be of any gender or sexual orientation. The relationship uses the term "slave" because of the association of the term with ownership rights of a master to their slave's body, as property or chattel. While male "masters" will usually be referred to as "Master", whether or not female Masters are referred to as "Master" or "Mistress" may depend upon whether they identify as following the leather subculture or BDSM path, or simply preference.

Sexual slavery in a BDSM context is both a sexual fantasy and sexual roleplay. The slave master or mistress might be any person or group, though the majority of such relationships are usually either one dominant, or a committed dominant couple, owning one or more slaves. A slave and the owner, and others involved in the relationship, can be of any gender, sexual identity, or orientation.

The Master/slave (or Owner/property) relationship is consensual, without the legal force of historical or modern non-consensual slavery, which is forbidden by the laws of most countries.

== Terminology ==
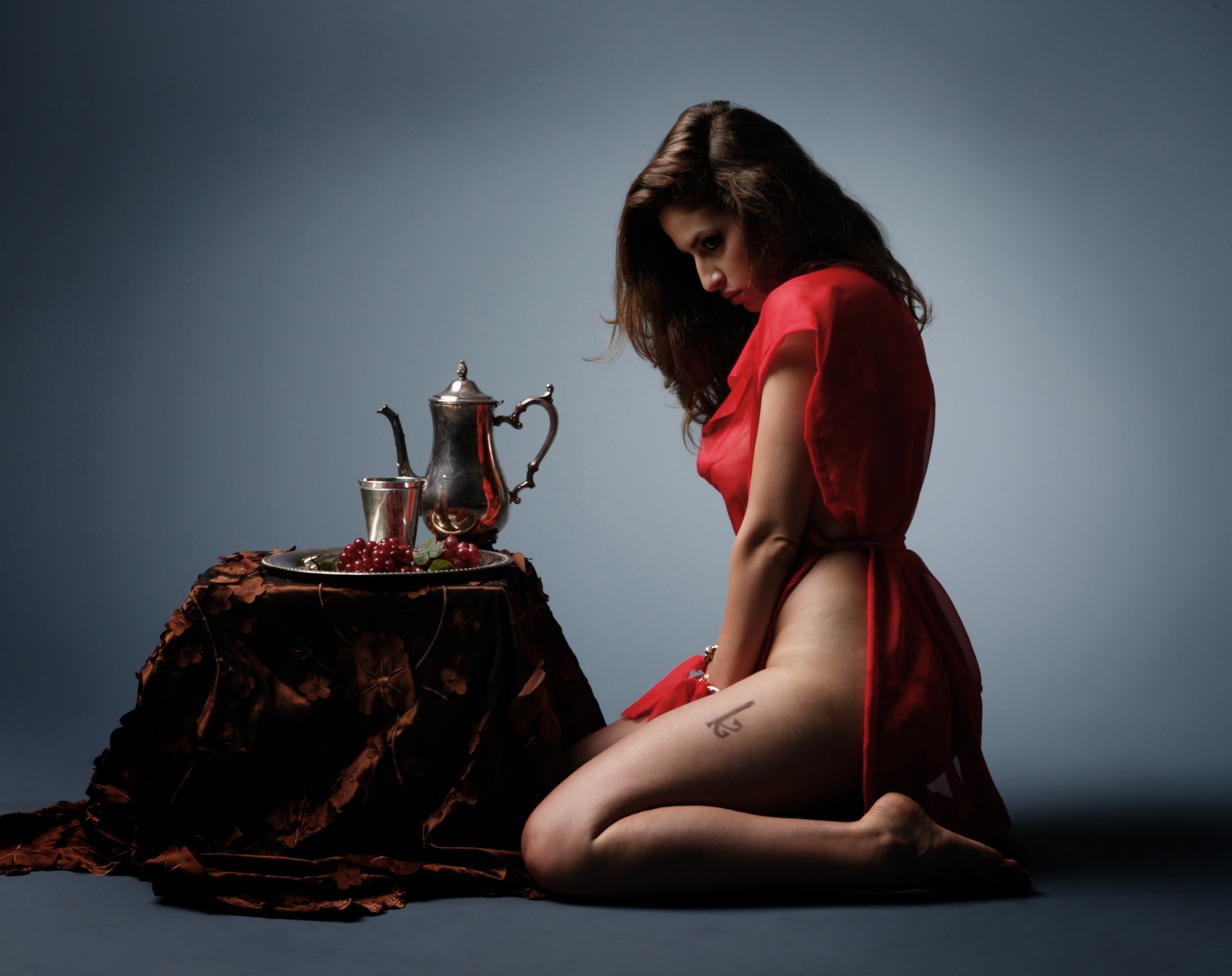
Model dressed as the fictional slave-girl Kajira from John Norman's Gor novels

The term "slave" is used rather than "sex slave" because sex is not a necessary component of consensual slavery. In BDSM, a slave is a specific type of submissive. Not all submissives are slaves, though all slaves would normally be considered submissive in the relationship. However, some calling themselves "slave" may only be submissive within a sexual context/activity whilst others are also submissive within other or all aspects of the relationship, "sex-slave" or "slave" respectively.

== Slave ==
Outside the BDSM community, the relationship of Master/slave is sometimes regarded as a form of consensual sexual slavery. In BDSM, a slave is a specific type of submissive. The Master/slave relationship refers to the relationship between the individuals involved, and does not necessarily require any specific acts, sexual or otherwise, though sexual activity is usually an aspect of the relationship. The sexual aspect could be conventional, and not necessarily BDSM. A slave could also be a masochist or bottom, but this is not always the case.

Some participants regard the relationship as sexual roleplay, while others enter into the relationship on the basis of a highly committed, long-term, submissive lifestyle.

== Symbols and rituals ==
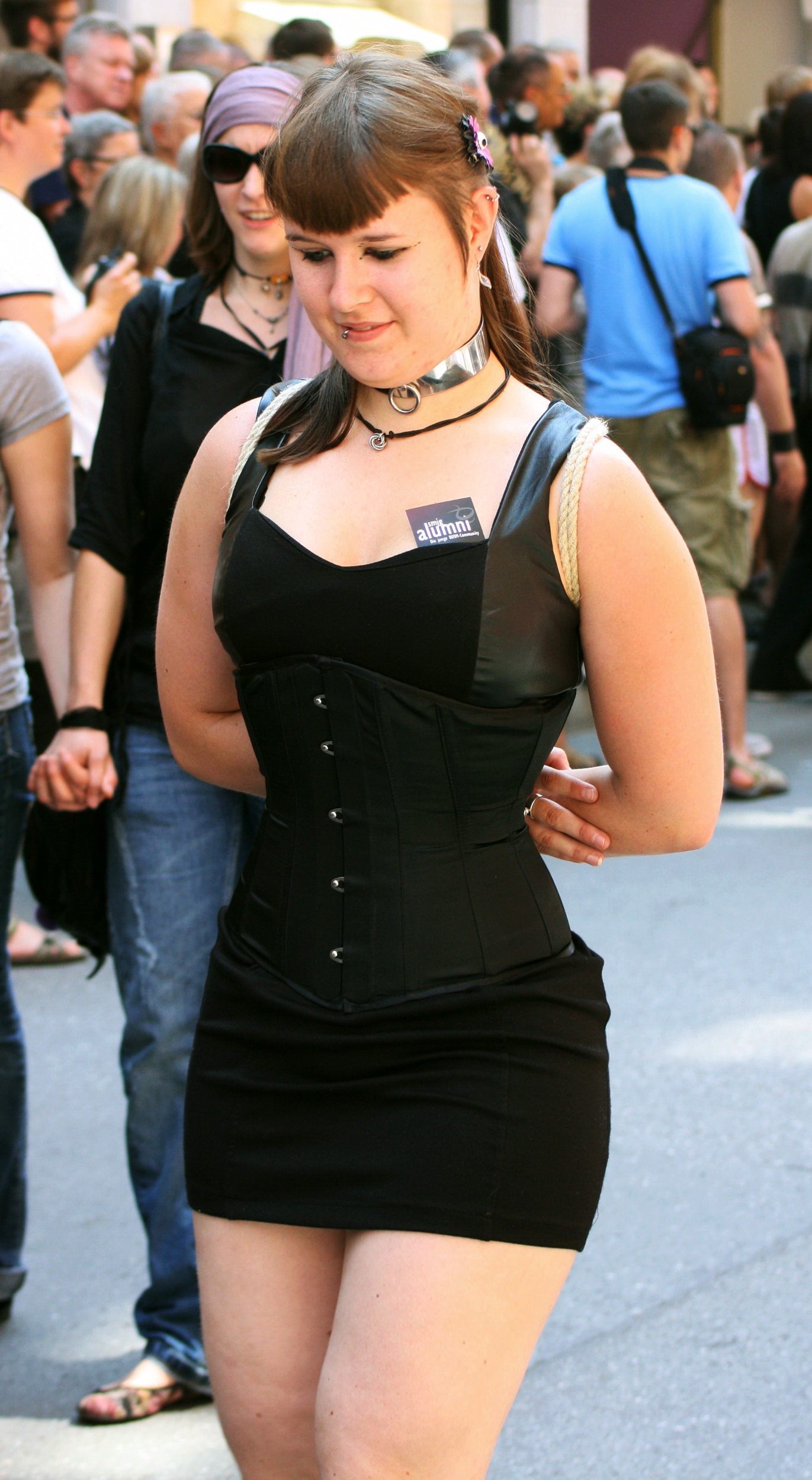
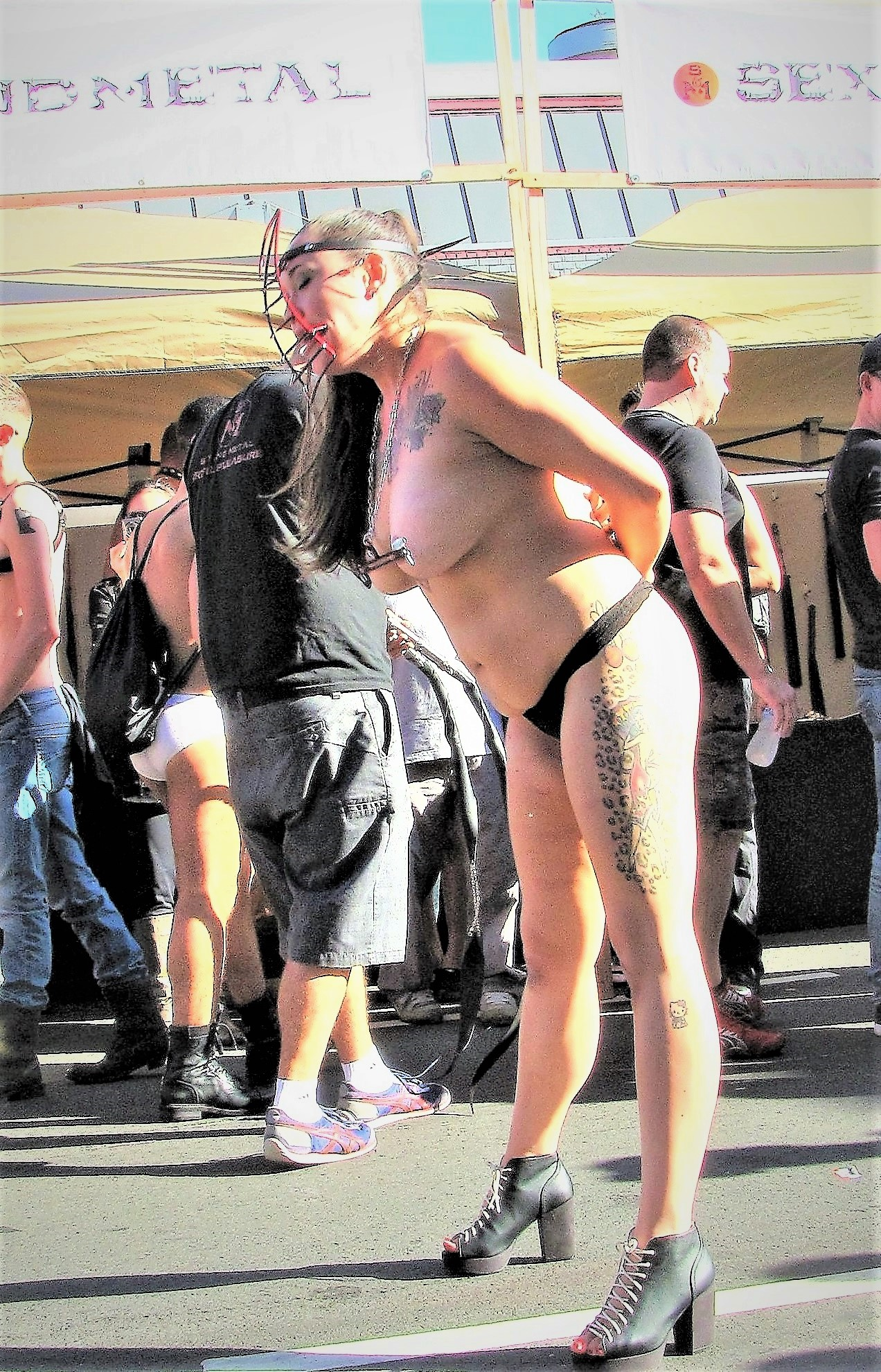
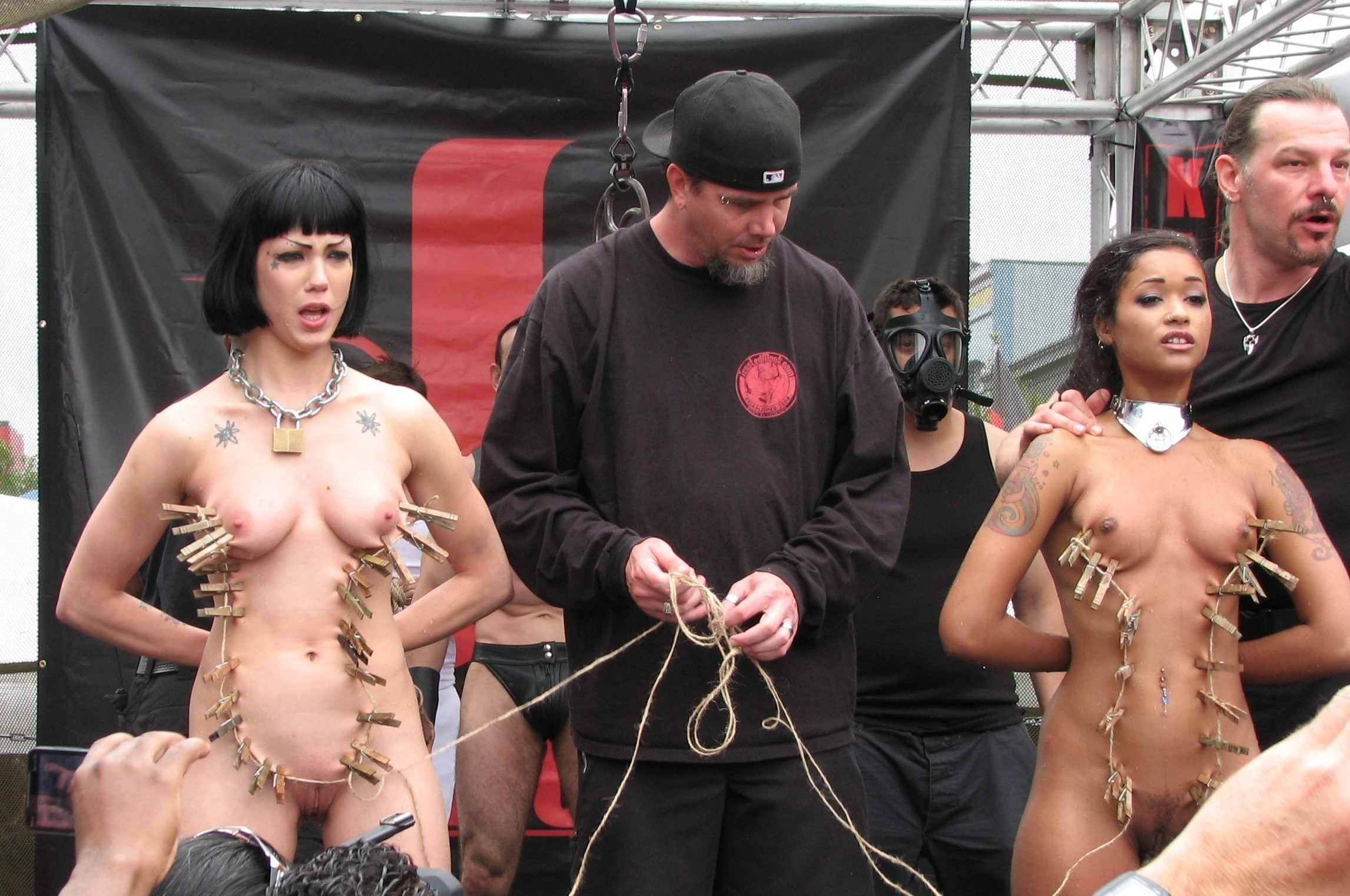
Left top: A submissive at 2011 Christopher Street Day, Germany. Right top and bottom: Three submissives at 2012 (top) and 2011 (bottom) Folsom Street Fair, USA. In all images, the women are standing in a typical slave posture with hands folded at the back.

Various forms of symbolism are sometimes used to affirm the owner/slave relationship. These include wearing the owner's collar, being registered in a slave register, adopting (sometimes legally changing to) a name chosen by the owner, or engaging in a public declaration or ritualized ceremony of some type.

Some people draw up a slave contract that defines the relationship in explicit detail. These contracts may also deal with domestic arrangements (such as cleanliness, home duties) and interpersonal relationship matters (such as issues of deference, language, etc.), besides the sexual arrangements. Typically, they would provide that the Master or Mistress has the exclusive authority in all matters relating to the body and behavior of the slave, including underwear and other clothing, social relations outside of the arrangement, etc. Although such contracts are not enforceable in the ways legal contracts are, they can be useful for defining in written form the limits of the arrangement between the signatories, and for documenting the consensual nature of the relationships they define between them.

In some traditional rituals, after signing a slave contract, the commitment to the relationship is celebrated by a collaring ceremony, which can be simple or elaborate, often witnessed by invited friends. The slave then wears a collar to publicly declare the slave's subjugation and the Master's ownership. Such a collar may be a piece of neckwear, or may be a bracelet or other piece of jewelry that symbolizes slave status. Such a collar is generally not removed except for practical reasons such as medical or security requirements, unless or until the relationship is dissolved; however, a slave is sometimes permitted to wear a more subdued (or less obtrusive) one outside of the home — for example, during work or in social situations with people who may otherwise feel uncomfortable. Such a collar may also be locked onto the submissive by various means, such as a padlock, combination lock, etc., to further emphasize the ownership and control of the slave/submissive by their Master or Mistress.

== Slave training ==
Slave training is a BDSM activity usually involving a consensual power exchange between two people taking on the roles of a Master or Mistress and a slave. The objective is to change the slave's behavior in a manner that is pleasing to the Master or Mistress, for example to train the slave to follow a set of rules or commands that the Master or Mistress has provided.

Some Masters/Mistresses adopt a holistic approach to the maintenance and long-term development of their slave by using such models as Maslow's hierarchy of needs.

== Nature of the relationship ==
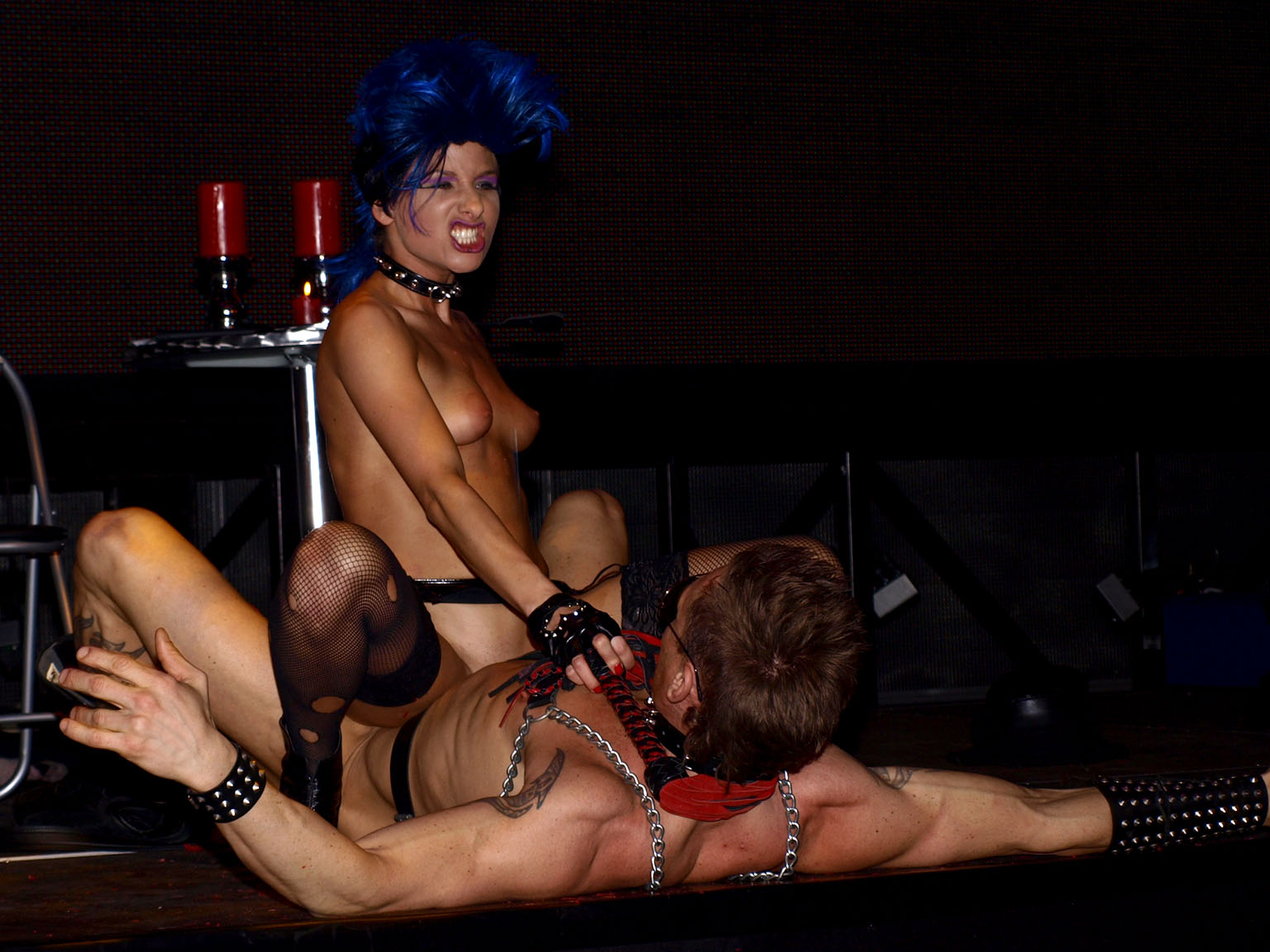
A mistress and her male slave perform for the audience at a 2009 sex show in Austria.

Sexual slavery is a consensual exchange of power by the submissive to the dominant, though the scope of the surrender of discretion may be limited and may be withdrawn at any time.

The types of activities that the slave may be expected to perform are usually defined in advance and sometimes spelled out in a slave contract, a document with social indications and value but without any real legal value that outlines the desires, limits, and expectations of the parties. The slave is often expected to perform sexually, though typically many relationship-oriented dynamics are also clearly negotiated, including clothing, diet, speech restrictions, household affairs and schedules, though the details may be left to the master or mistress. Typically outlined are clear expectations of whether the couple will be monogamous or polyamorous, and if there would be permission or expectation of sexual interaction with other people. Otherwise, a sex slave may be expected to perform many of the same functions that are expected of a slave/submissive, including wearing very revealing clothes, being shared, wearing a slave collar or leash, S&M activities, or bondage.

A Master/slave "relationship" is often a long-term relationship, comparable in duration to vanilla relationships, whereas a Dominant/submissive "relationship" could also be of the same duration or shorter - even lasting only the duration of a scene, for example, which may range from a number of minutes to hours. Depending on their contract and if the slave is willing to not be monogamous, a slave may be traded by their Master/Mistress, facilitated by sex club events, personals in BDSM interest magazines, or internet based social networks. Commonly, a slave is also said to be "collared" if the relationship has become serious enough to the point where the slave has earned a collar in the eyes of their Master or Mistress. Though not every slave wears a physical slave collar, other jewellery may be worn as a token of their dedication and servitude to their Master/Mistress. These are commonly referred to as day collars within the community.

A slave who has satisfied the duration of the negotiated time of service is expected to be released, unless a new duration of service is negotiated. In a consensual Master/slave or Dominant/submissive relationship, a slave or a master may withdraw their consent at any time, effectively nullifying the slave relationship.

In a 'Total Power Exchange (TPE)' dynamic, the master is able to dictate any and all aspects of the slave's life, and is able to issue commands to which the slave must comply with, even outside of play, as long as the dynamic is in effect. In a 'free use' dynamic, the master is able to initiate sexual activity with the slave at any time and at any place, and the slave must therefore be perpetually ready for sexual activity. Such dynamics tend to coincide with 24/7 arrangements, where the dynamics are perpetually ongoing, without pauses or breaks, until otherwise stated.

== See also ==
- Animal roleplay
- Body worship
- Consent
- Discipline (BDSM)
- Domination & submission
- Erotic humiliation
- Gorean
- Sadomasochism
- Servitude
- Sexual fetishism
- Sexual roleplay
- Top, bottom, switch (BDSM)

== Sources ==
- Rubel, Robert J. (2015). Master/slave Mastery: Updated handbook of concepts, approaches, and practices. Red Eight-Ball Press. ISBN 978-0986352119.
