= Erotic humiliation =

Consensual use of humiliation in a sexual context

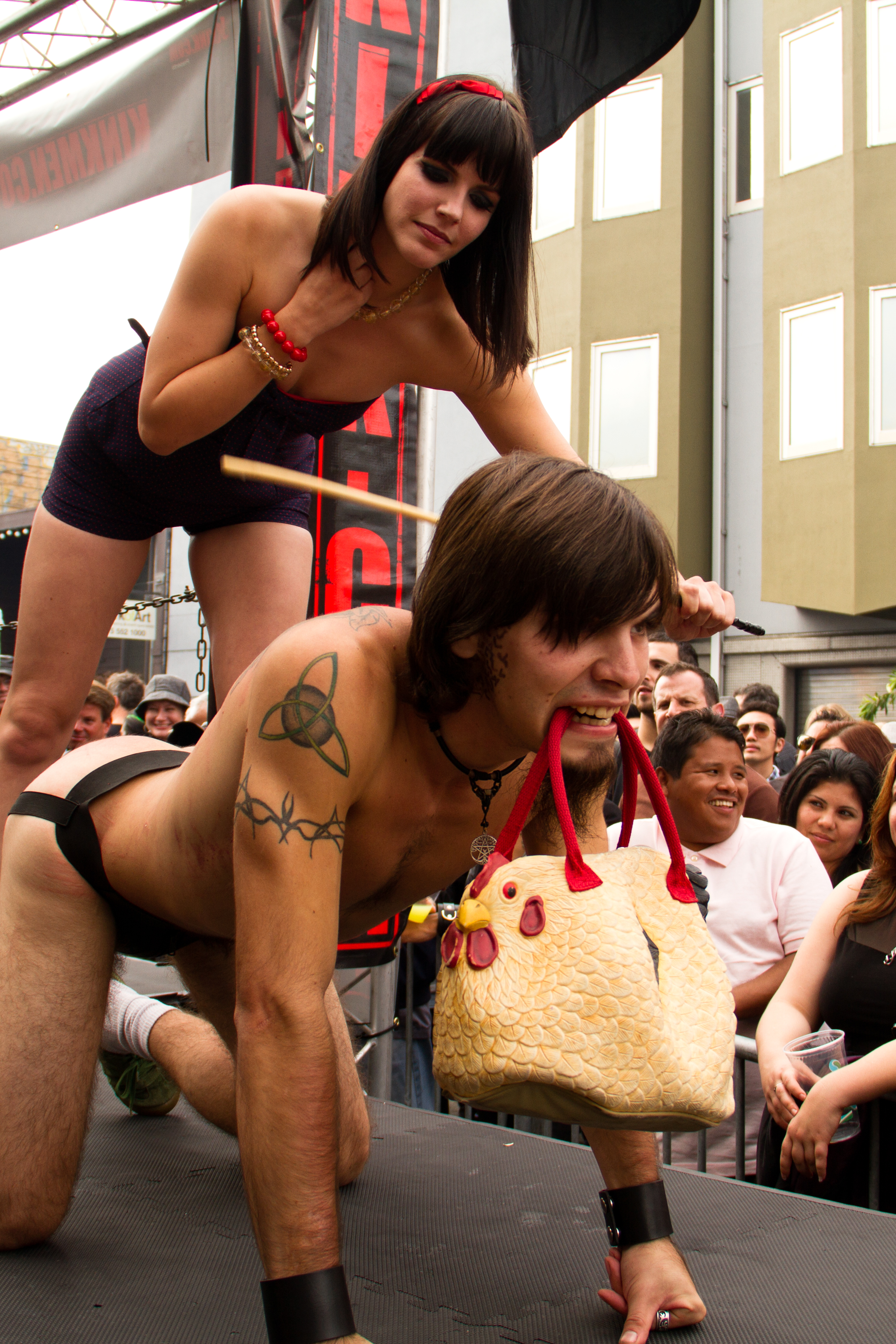
Humiliation of a man being forced to kneel and hold a dominatrix's purse with his mouth while being caned at Folsom Street Fair in the United States

Erotic humiliation, or sexual humiliation, is consensual psychological humiliation done in order to produce sexual arousal, particularly as a sexual fetish in the context of a domination and submission activity. Erotic humiliation can also occur in various other contexts, including pornography, webcam modeling, BDSM and sexual roleplay.

Relatively little has been written about erotic humiliation.

== Psychology ==
Humiliation in general stimulates some of the same brain regions associated with physical pain, suggesting that social rewards and punishments can have strong psychological effects.

For some individuals, humiliation-related practices may function as a form of ego reduction or as a way of overcoming sexual inhibitions. Certain communities may reclaim or eroticize insults historically used against them, including terms associated with homophobia.

The humiliation itself is not considered intrinsic to any particular act or object. Rather, it is semiotically constructed through the shared attitudes and interpretations of the participants, who assign humiliating significance to specific acts, objects, or body parts.

== Prevalence ==
A small 1987 survey of one-hundred and seventy-eight men found that 55.9% of them had tried and enjoyed either enacting or receiving sexual humiliation.

A study published in 2015 surveyed a sample of 1580 women involved in BDSM about their kinks. Of those surveyed, a total of 77.53% enjoyed participating in physical humiliation (ie. face-slapping, crawling/making someone crawl, begging), with 32.03% liking to enact it, 54.43% liking to have it enacted on them, 66.96% enjoying both, and 52.91% liking to observe. 66.77% of respondents enjoyed verbal humiliation (ie. yelling, name-calling), with 25.7% liking to enact it, 42.72% liking to receive it, 53.23% liking both enacting and receiving, and 44.81% liking to observe.

== Methods ==
=== Small penis humiliation ===
Small penis humiliation (SPH) is a form of erotic humiliation involving the degradation and insulting of one's penis size. The practice may involve sexual acts, verbal humiliation, or the posting of one's penis online to be mocked.

SPH can be erotic and arousing for both the dominant and submissive. It is sometimes associated with a cuckoldry fetish, when the submissive is rejected and humiliated for their small penis, and with feminization.

For many, weakening the sense of manhood imposed by society can be erotic.

=== Other types ===
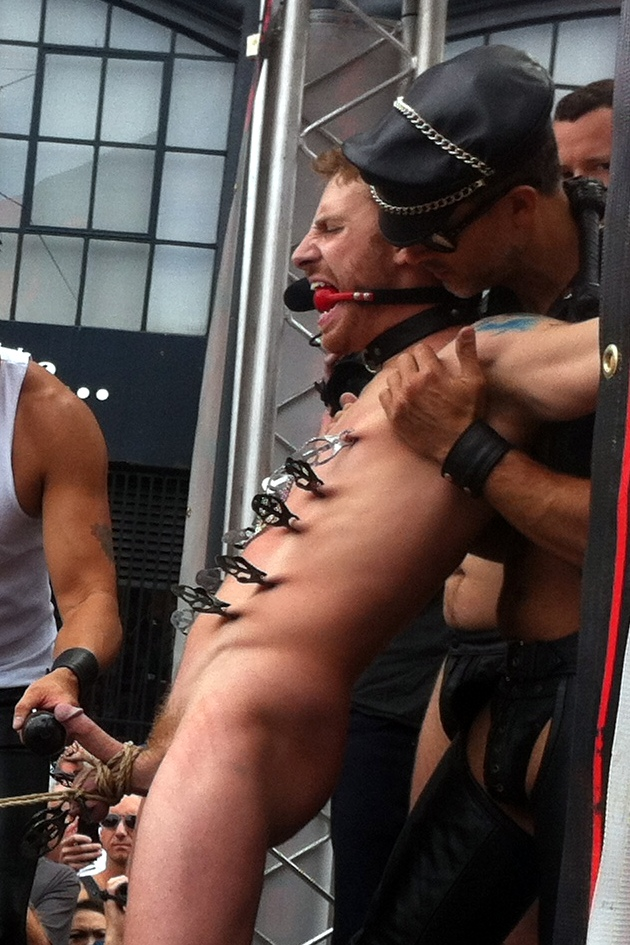
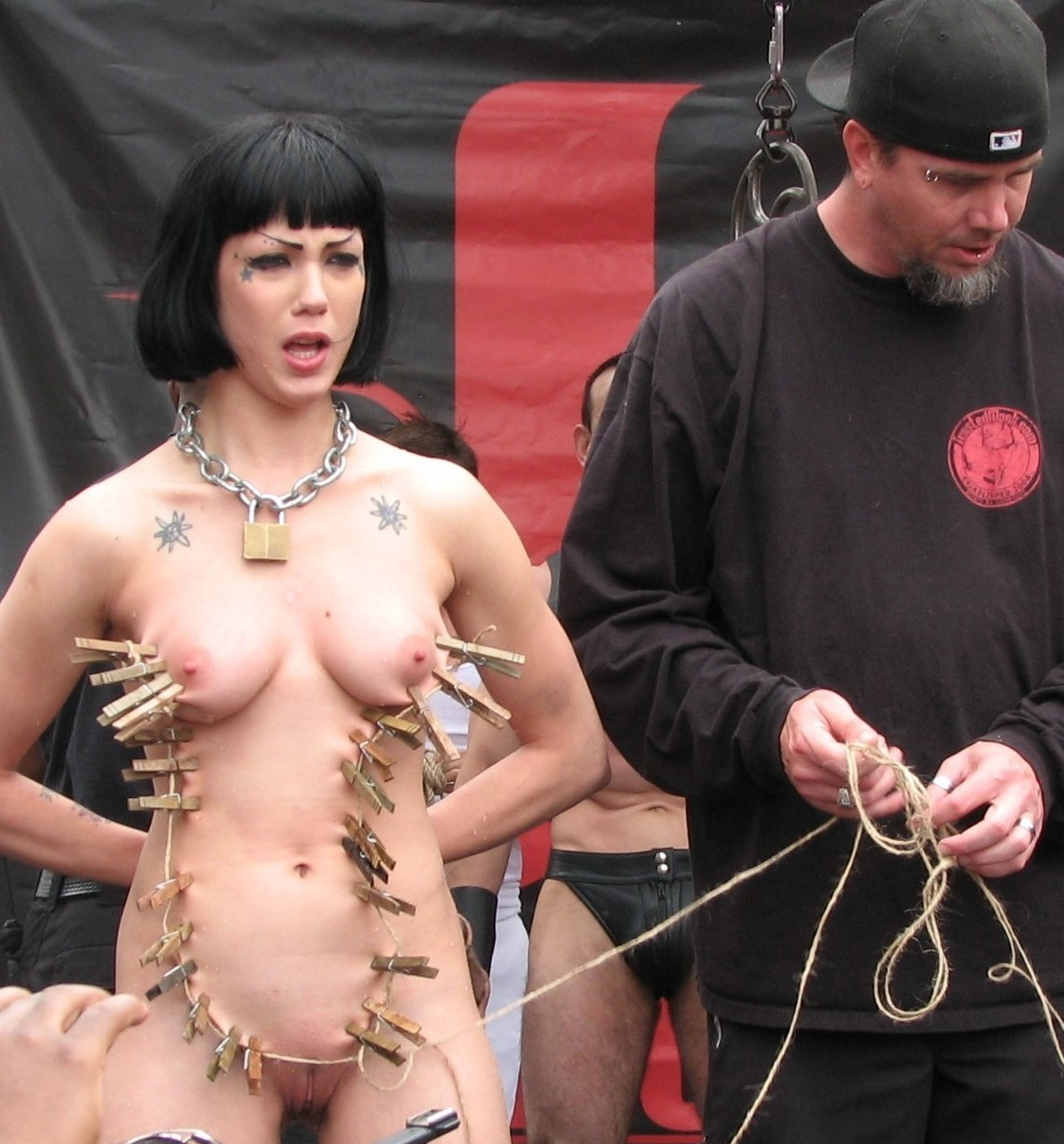
Cock and ball torture (left) and breast torture (right) showcased on nude submissives at the Folsom Street Fair, US
- Animal play
- Ageplay
- Mockery, derision, and ridicule of breasts, facial appearance, genitalia (including small penis size, erection difficulties, circumcision status, or clitoris and labia size), buttocks, or about behaviors such as walking, responsiveness, and hygiene.
- Feederism
- Peotomy

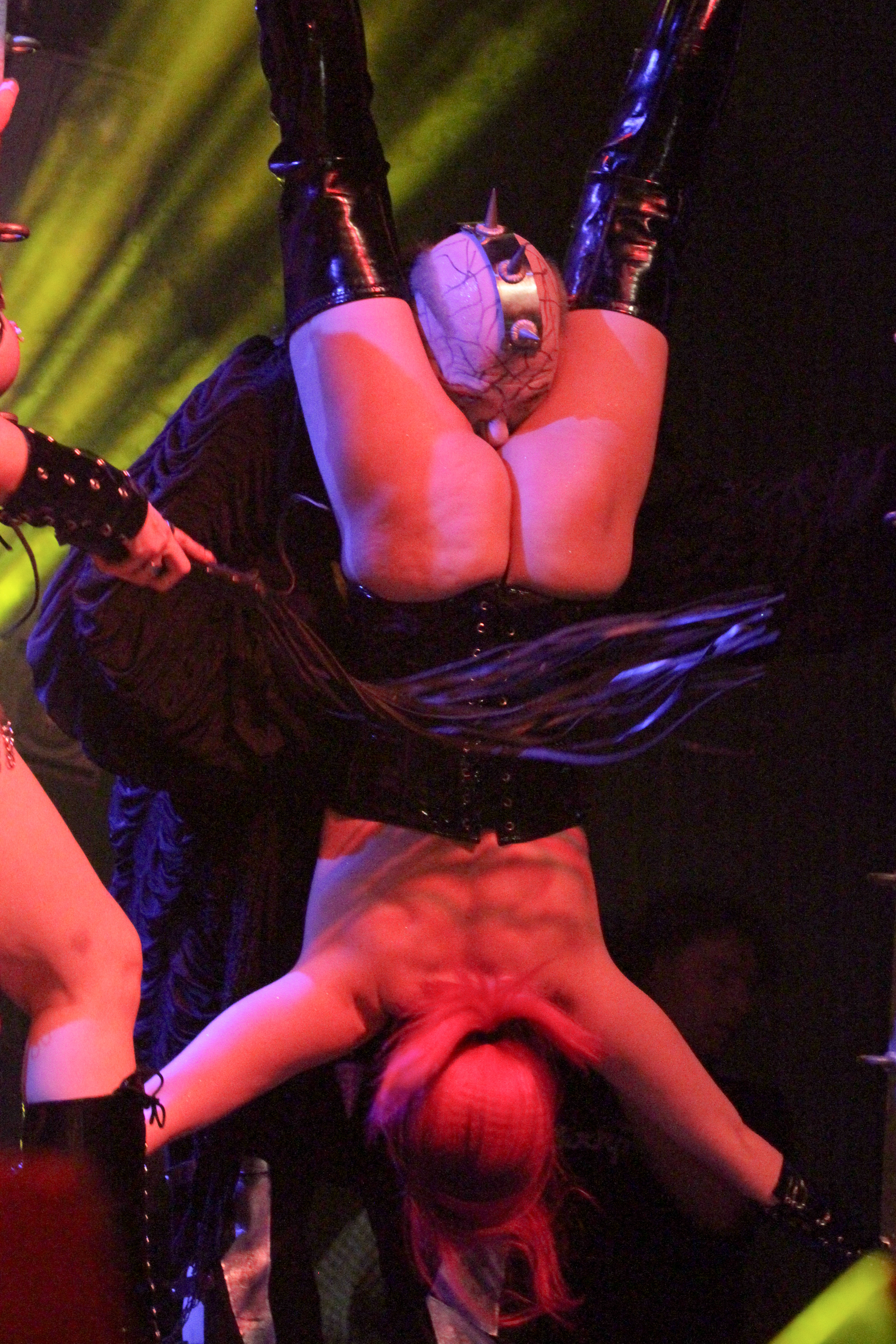
The erotic humiliation of a woman is performed at Wave-Gotik-Treffen music festival, Germany, 2014. She is stripped naked, hung upside down and whipped while a master roleplays a devil.

- Ejaculating, spitting, squirting, or urinating on the submissive's body, especially on the face.
- Servitude.
- Sexual acts intended to reinforce submission, including cunnilingus, analingus, and fellatio.
- Body worship, including activities related to a foot fetish, breast fetish, or shoe fetish.
- Discipline (BDSM), including erotic spanking, slapping, whipping, restraint, and other BDSM practices such as cock and ball torture.
- Dresscode (BDSM), including prescribed or prohibited clothing in private or public settings.
  - Forced feminization or cross-dressing.
  - Wearing a chastity device.
- Erotic sexual denial, including orgasm control and chastity practices.
- Public humiliation, including exhibitionism, in which others are aware of or witness the treatment.
- Erotic objectification, in which the submissive is used as human furniture.
- Embarrassment
- Facesitting
- Cuckolding and cuckqueaning
- Forced masturbation
- Enema
- Candaulism
- Financial domination
- Wet and messy play

== See also ==
- Dominance and submission
- Erotic sexual denial
- Master/slave (BDSM)
- Petticoating
