= Male dominance (BDSM) =

Erotic practice

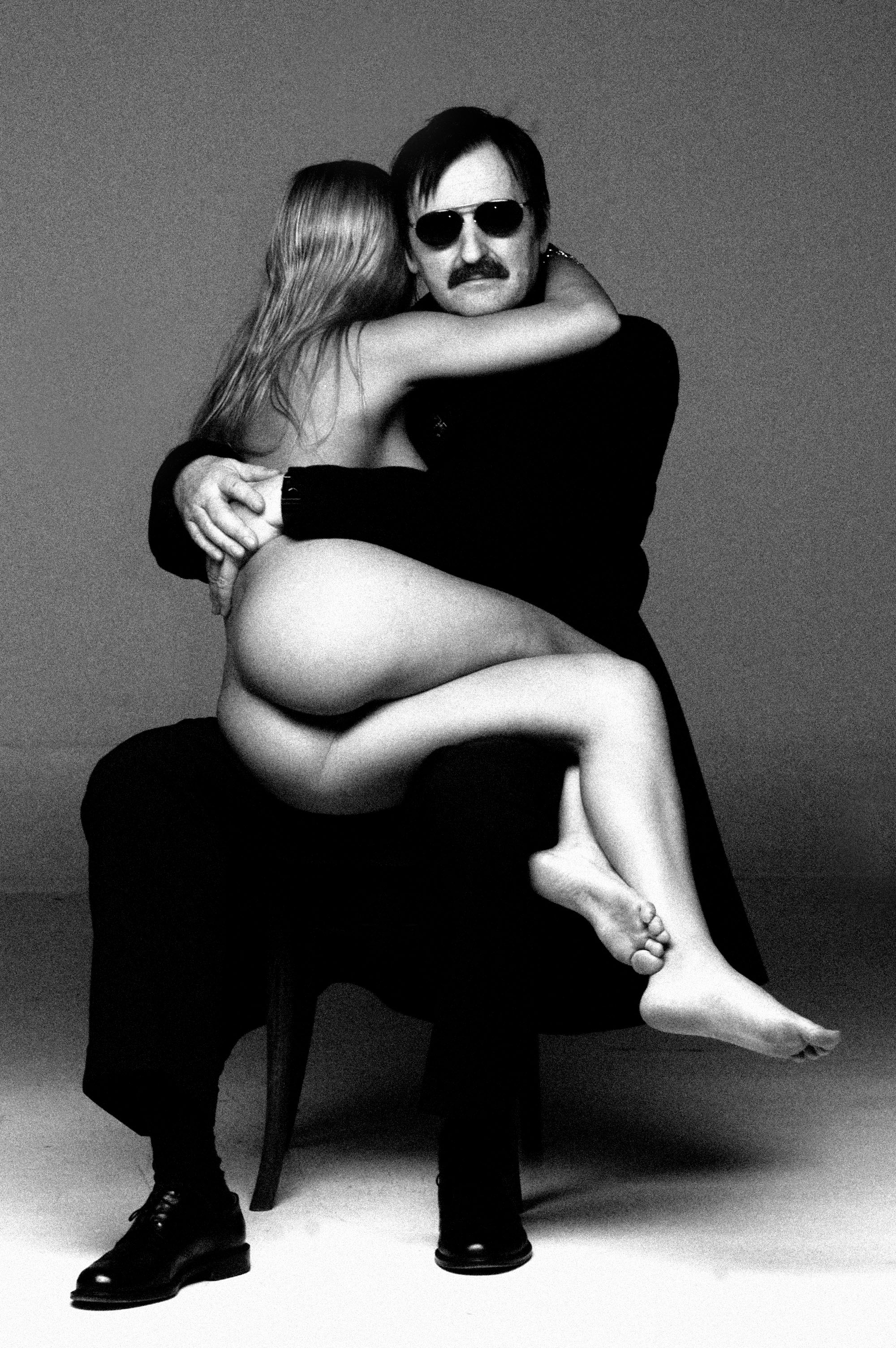
Artistic portrayal of a male dominant embracing a nude female submissive

Male dominance, or maledom, is a form of dominance and submission in BDSM in which the dominant partner is male. The term maledom may also refer to a male dominant.

Male dominance is a recurring theme in BDSM literature and popular culture. It is depicted in the works of the Marquis de Sade, as well as in BDSM fiction, including Story of O, the novels of John Norman, and the Fifty Shades series by E. L. James. It is also represented in adult films and the wider BDSM community.

== Popular culture ==
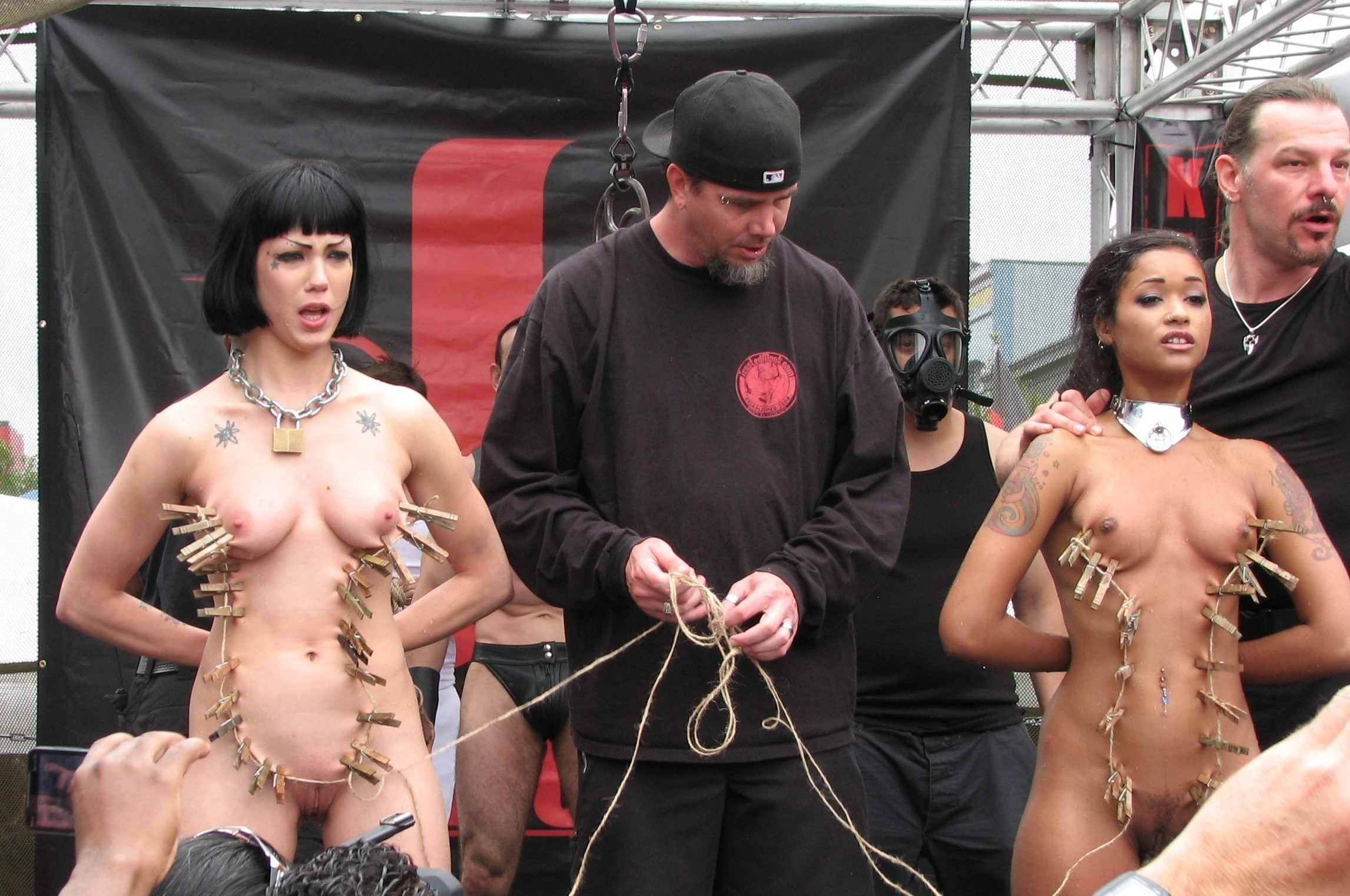
Male dominance in public at Folsom Street Fair, US

Maledom scenarios are common in BDSM fiction, including works such as the Story of O and the works of John Norman and Adrian Hunter. Maledom is a growing adult film genre.

Maledom fiction began with the works of the Marquis de Sade who wrote about sexual scenarios in which men tortured others, primarily women. The term sadism is derived from de Sade's name. Since then, the lifestyle around male dominance has grown into a large part of the BDSM scene.

The Fifty Shades novel series by E. L. James is associated with the cultural mainstreaming and normalising of BDSM. The books achieved great commercial success, with the first volume selling over 100 million copies worldwide.

Other works include:

- John Warren, The Loving Dominant, Greenery Press, 2001, ISBN 1-890159-20-4
- Jack Rinella, The Master's Manual: Handbook of Erotic Dominance, Daedalus Publishing, 1997, ISBN 1-881943-03-8

== See also ==
- Cuckquean
- Dominance and submission
- Dominatrix
- Female submission
- Gender role
- Male submission
