= Jerk off instruction =

Pornography genre

Jerk off instruction (JOI, pronounced "joy") is a genre of pornography in which a performer gives spoken or written guidance to masturbation. Usually produced in video form, the practice became popular in the early 2020s on platforms such as Clips4Sale and OnlyFans, primarily due to the low barrier for entry. Analysts highlight the personalized nature of the videos and the power dynamic between the viewer and the performer as reasons for JOI's appeal.

== Overview ==
Jerk off instruction (JOI) videos feature a single performer who gives instructions meant to assist in masturbation. Unlike most other pornography genres, the performer often wears clothing, such as lingerie, rather than being fully nude. The videos may also feature visual graphics and text with additional instructions. While aimed primarily at male masturbation, jerk off instructions for women and non-binary individuals also exist. JOI content may be combined with other sexual practices, such as edging, foot fetishism or femdom. Such content is frequently hosted on adult platforms, such as Clips4Sale and OnlyFans.

JOI has been incorporated into interactive formats, such as the pornographic rhythm game Cock Hero (pun on Guitar Hero) and the erotic podcast Voxxx.

== History ==
According to Clips4Sale's spokesperson Avery Martin, "JOI as a concept has existed for a long time, but it’s only more recently that it got a name and became its own recognized fetish." Martin named Babestation and "masturbation encouragement" videos as precursors to JOI. Samuel Davis of Know Your Sins noted that the acronym originally appeared in the early 2000s in the form of audio pornography.

The popularity of jerk off instructions increased in the early 2020s, with Clips4Sale reporting a 186% increase in sales of JOI material in United States, 208% in Germany and 48% in Australia from 2022 to 2025. Writing for Tyla, Jen Thomas argued that the surge in popularity was primarily caused by the ease of making content, as it only requires one person and a camera device. Martin opined that the COVID-19 pandemic also caused an influx of JOI content.

== Analysis ==
Various adult creators and actors highlighted the personalized nature of jerk off instructions. Martin stated that "JOI taps into more than just arousal. It fulfills the need to feel wanted, controlled, praised or denied," creating an experience that feels customized and tailored to the viewer. European Instagram fetish account MissWaltrude described JOI content as "a masturbatory trance experience [...] about taking control of another person’s erotic energy, layer by layer," that lets the viewer confess about their habits. Sex Work CEO founder MelRose Michaels described JOI as an "erotic performance style [that] blends control, seduction, dominance and emotional connection all at once."

Samuel Davis mentioned the lack of equipment and sexual experience required to produce JOI videos, opining that the genre is a prominent entry point for pornographic content creators. He also highlighted the psychology of being instructed, which puts the viewer in an anticipating and attentive situation. Femdom JOI was named as the more intense variation of the practice, due to the power dynamic between the viewer and the commanding dominatrix as well as the mixing of various femdom-related concepts, such as orgasm denial and erotic humiliation.

== In popular culture ==
In the HBO series Euphoria, the character Cassie, played by actress Sydney Sweeney, has a prominent OnlyFans career by selling JOI videos on the platform.

== See also ==
- Edging (sexual practice)
- Gooning
- Sex education
