= Locktober =

Annual month-long event

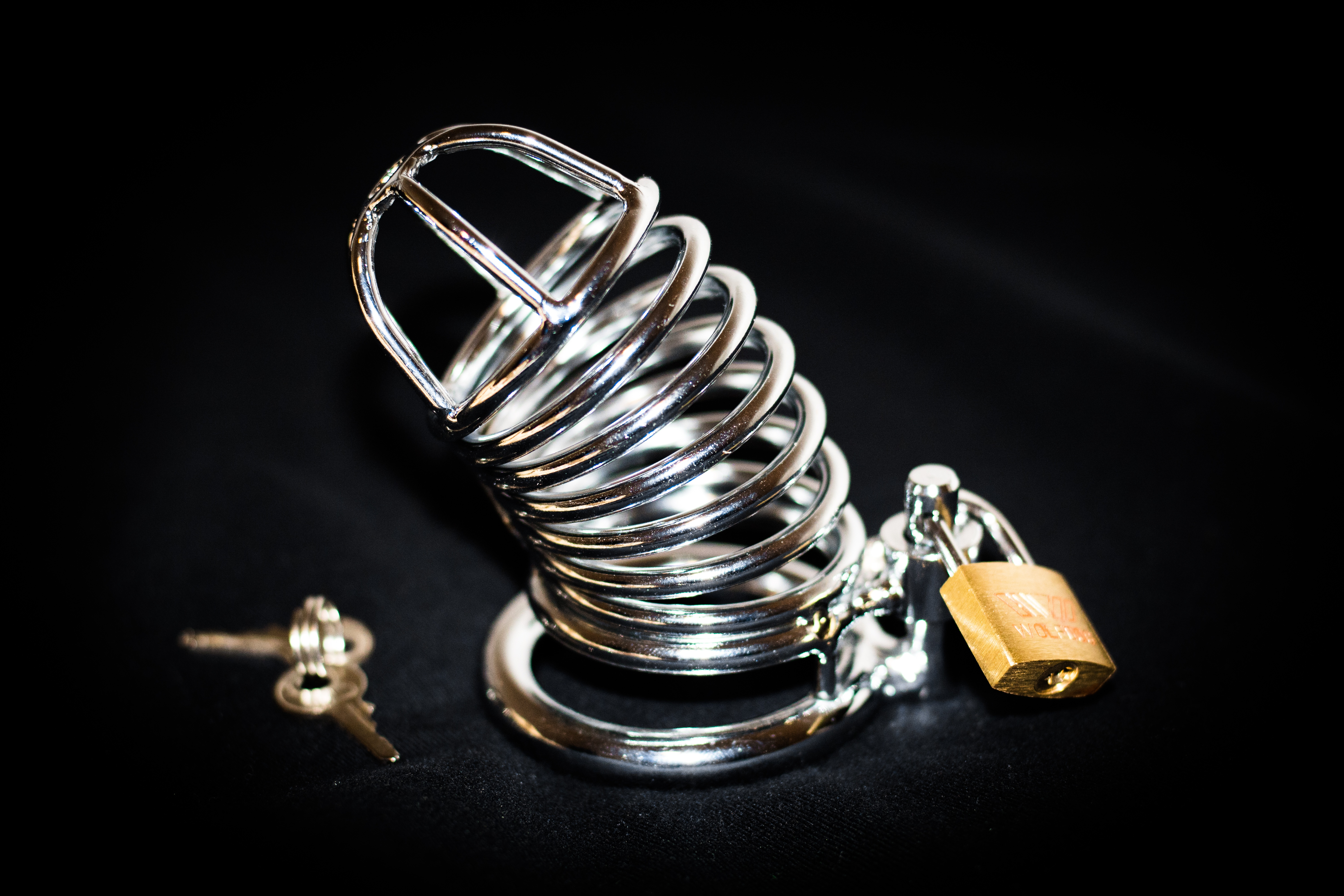
Locktober involves participants wearing chastity devices to prevent them from having sex. This metal cage is designed to prevent penis erections.

Locktober is an annual month-long event centered around chastity, observed largely within BDSM and kink communities. Throughout October, participants commit to wearing a chastity cage or abstaining from sexual activity, often under the control of a dominant partner. For many, the event serves as both a personal erotic challenge and a communal tradition rooted in submission, denial, and self-discipline.

== History ==
The origins of Locktober trace back to kink message boards in the mid-2010s, with some chastity sites identifying 2015 as the first documented appearance of the term. The name is a portmanteau of "lock" and "October," referencing the practice of physically locking genitalia for the month. Locktober gained early momentum in online spaces such as Reddit, Tumblr, and FetLife, especially among users interested in orgasm denial and femdom dynamics. A dedicated subreddit, created in 2019, grew to over 23,000 members by 2024, while broader chastity communities on Reddit surpassed 300,000 members.

Search interest in Locktober has climbed steadily since 2016, with Google Trends showing that 2024 generated nearly double the engagement of prior years. The Daily Beast reported that chastity groups on Telegram have also seen growth, with some regional chatrooms—like one in Brooklyn—attracting nearly 2,000 members ahead of the event.

== Practices ==
The core ritual of Locktober involves wearing a chastity device—typically a cage made of plastic or metal that prevents erections—for the entire month. Some participants self-lock, while others entrust a partner (known as a "keyholder") with control of their release.

Goals and interpretations vary. While some pursue Locktober for sexual intensity and denial-based arousal, others approach it as a lifestyle commitment or act of devotion within dominant/submissive relationships. Common practices include:

- 24/7 chastity for 31 days
- Edging without orgasm
- Daily rituals or tasks assigned by a dominant
- Social media sharing or journal documentation

Community platforms like TeamLocked, EmlaLock, FetLife and Chaster help participants track progress, share photos, or communicate with keyholders.

== Cultural impact ==
Locktober's online visibility has expanded dramatically, pushing it into mainstream awareness. A 2024 tweet from Marvel Studios referring to actor Joe Locke as "Joe Locke-tober" went viral, prompting backlash and humor from fans familiar with the kink connotation.

Separately, TikTok and Instagram users have attempted to appropriate the term "Locktober" for self-improvement trends focused on fitness, sobriety, or productivity. Queerty and Yahoo News reported that many straight men unintentionally used the tag without knowing its actual meaning.

Chastity influencers such as "CagedJock" have further contributed to the event's visibility, garnering hundreds of thousands of followers and normalizing chastity imagery in queer erotic content.

== Reception and criticism ==
Locktober is praised within kink circles as a consensual and enriching form of sexual play. Participants describe intense erotic energy, deepened relationships, and self-exploration.

However, some voices within the community advise caution. Eli Shaw, a long-term chastity wearer quoted in PinkNews, warned that a full month of denial may be too extreme for newcomers. Others highlight the importance of hygiene, device fit, and communication to avoid physical discomfort or unintended psychological stress.

== See also ==
- Chastity device
- BDSM
- Erotic humiliation
- Erotic sexual denial
- No Nut November
