= No Nut November =

Annual sexual abstinence challenge

No Nut November (NNN) is an annual internet challenge of sexual abstinence and not masturbating during November. It originated in 2011 and grew in popularity among male users of social media during and after 2017. Destroy Dick December serves as a counterpoint.

== History ==
Although No Nut November was originally intended to be satirical, some participants claim that abstaining from ejaculating and not watching pornography has health benefits. An Urban Dictionary entry for No Nut November was published in 2011, and, in 2017, the movement started to gain popularity on social media. It is associated with the NoFap community on Reddit, which encourages its members not to masturbate. The Reddit community /r/NoNutNovember grew from 16,500 subscribers in November 2018 to 52,000 subscribers in November 2019.

In 2017, a related internet challenge, Destroy Dick December, began as a counterpoint to No Nut November, encouraging participants to take part in excessive amounts of sexual activities such as intercourse and masturbation, after abstaining from them during the previous month.

After some far-right public figures, including Paul Joseph Watson, promoted the campaign, E. J. Dickson of Rolling Stone suggested that the movement had been co-opted by the far-right. Vice criticized the challenge in 2018 after adherents sent threats to xHamster on Twitter, similarly saying it had been co-opted by far-right figures.

== See also ==
- "The Contest", a Seinfeld episode about abstinence from masturbation
- Coitus reservatus, a form of sexual intercourse in which a man attempts to remain at the moment before ejaculation for as long as possible
- Edging, a form of orgasm control
- National Masturbation Day, originally held on May 7, 1995, as an event to honor Joycelyn Elders, it was later expanded to the month of May as International Masturbation Month
- Locktober – a kink-focused chastity challenge that takes place during October, involving abstinence and physical devices
