= Interrogation scene =

Form of BDSM roleplay

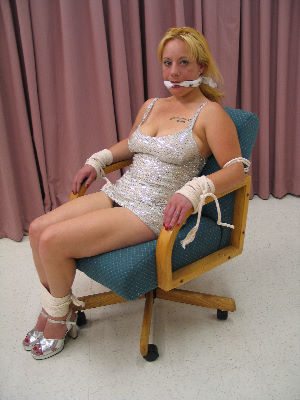
A woman is tied to a chair, and gagged.

An interrogation scene is a form of BDSM roleplay in which the participants act out the parts of torturer and victim. As in real life torture chambers throughout the world over, the "torturer" uses threats, humiliation and physical pain to extract whatever information they believe the "victim" possesses. The game is over when the victim has broken and divulged the secret. The length and severity of the scene will vary according to the temperament of the players. Dedicated players attempt to replicate the atmosphere of a real torture session and, as in real life, the "victim" can expect to be stripped naked, tied up, mocked and abused.

== Methods ==
Popular methods of play in interrogation scenes include tickle torture, where the victim will be tied up and tickled continuously without relief (particularly in areas that are quite sensitive; such as the belly, underarms, feet, toes, nipples and genitalia) until the victim submits and reveals the information.

One form of torture is orgasm control or erotic sexual denial, where the submissive victim is sexually stimulated to the brink of orgasm by the torturer. The torturer may then reduce the stimulation and keep the victim in a state of extended arousal for a long period of time. By varying the pace of the stimulation, the victim may be forced to undergo cycles of "up" and "down" arousal by the torturer. When satisfied with the experience, the victim may divulge the secret in order to be brought to the desired orgasm by the torturer. The interrogation may be continued past the orgasm, particularly if the victim orgasms without divulging the secret. Generally, the glans becomes very sensitive after orgasm, and continued stimulation may manifest more as an extreme tickling sensation. This can become quite uncomfortable for the victim, or perhaps even painful, providing them with an incentive to comply with the torturer's demands.

== Use as a defense in civil lawsuits ==
In at least one legal case, interrogation fantasies have been raised as a defense to a civil lawsuit.
