= Chastity device =

Chastity device may refer to:

- Chastity belt
- Chastity belt (BDSM)
- Chastity piercing
