= Epididymal hypertension =

Condition that arises during human sexual arousal when seminal fluid is not ejaculated

- Other names: Sexual arousal orchialgia
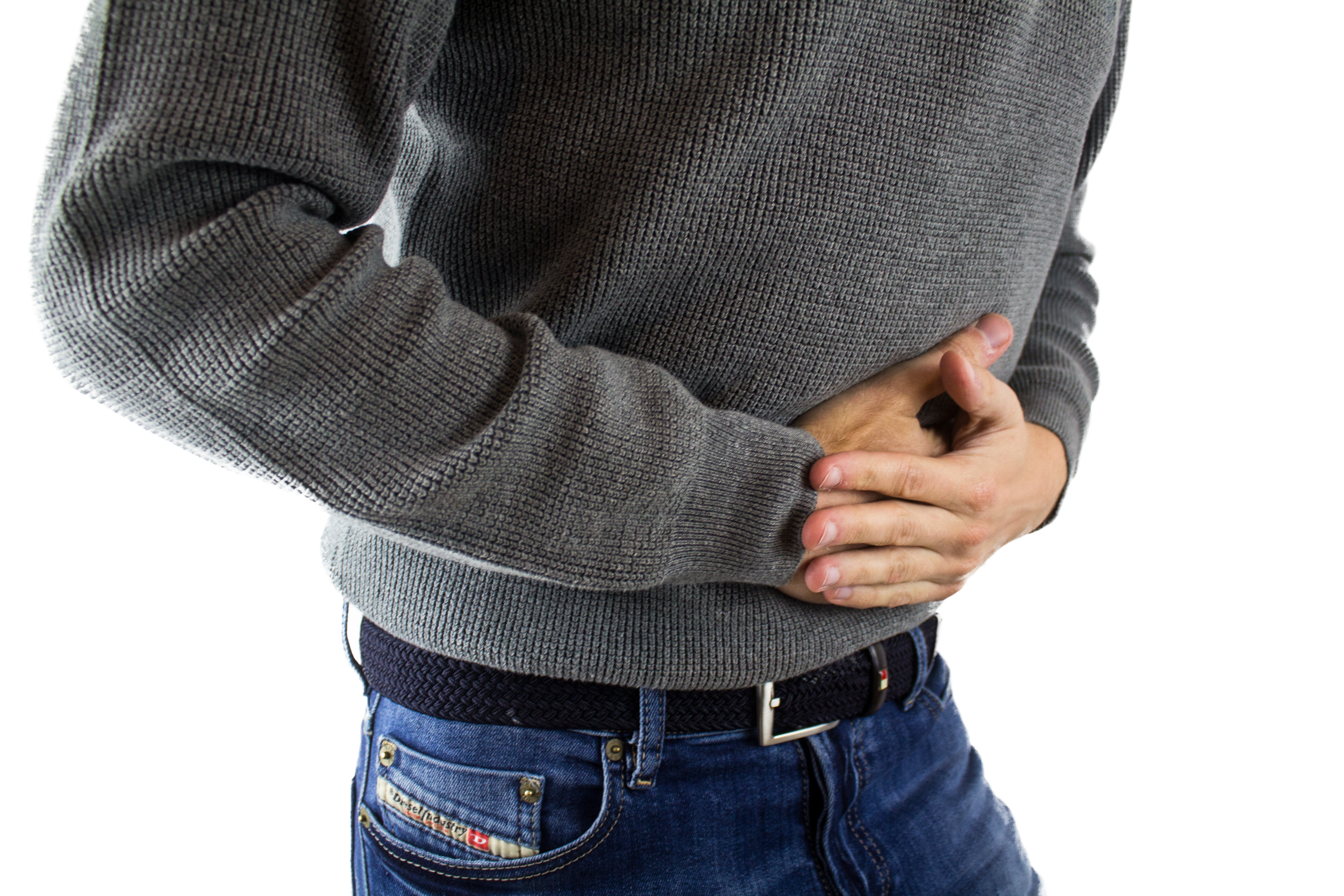
- The phenomenon manifests itself in the form of mild discomfort around the genitals or in the lower abdomen.
- Specialty: Urology

Epididymal hypertension (EH), informally referred to as blue balls for males or blue vulva for females, is a harmless but uncomfortable sensation in the genital regions during a prolonged state of sexual arousal. It usually resolves within hours unless relieved through an orgasm.

In females, the discomfort occurs in the erectile tissue and clitoris of the vulva. In males, the phenomenon results in an uncomfortable testicular sensation. It most often describes a temporary fluid congestion in the testicles or vulva, caused by prolonged sexual arousal without orgasm.

The term epididymal hypertension is derived from the epididymis, a part of the male reproductive system. The term is also applied to females despite the lack of an epididymis in female anatomy. Professor Caroline Pukall, who co-wrote the first in-depth study on EH, has suggested using the term throbbing crotch syndrome. The term "blue balls" is thought to have originated in the US, first appearing in 1916. Though lesser known, the equivalent of this phenomenon in females is informally referred to as "blue vulva", among other names. It is not to be confused with the inability to orgasm or the masturbatory practice of edging.

== Research ==
The phenomenon is sometimes associated with males who are experiencing and practicing delayed, multiple, or inhibited ejaculation. There is scant information on the phenomenon in scientific literature. This is curious given that awareness of the condition goes back centuries, with many barely remembered terms having been applied to it between the early 18th through early 20th centuries in several western European languages. The treatment is to achieve orgasm, or alternatively strain to move a very heavy object—in essence doing a Valsalva maneuver.

== Causes ==
The cause of epididymal hypertension is an excessive amount of blood circulation to the genital area, specifically the penis and testicles, without the release of tension associated with orgasm and ejaculation. When a significant volume of blood flows to the genital region, the penis becomes erect, and the testicles also experience increased blood flow and swelling. In the vulva, blood flow increases in the erectile tissue, causing it to expand. After orgasm, this tissue shrinks back to its initial size as most of the blood leaves. When this process does not occur, it can result in mild discomfort.

== Symptoms ==
The following indications and symptoms may be experienced by both sexes:

- heaviness
- aching
- discomfort or mild pain

== See also ==
- Delayed ejaculation
- Edging (sexual practice)
- Erotic sexual denial
- Prostatic congestion
- Sexual frustration
- Pampiniform plexus
- Varicocele
- Retrograde ejaculation
