= Congestion =

Congestion may refer to:

== Medicine ==
- Excessive fluid in tissues, vessels, or both, including:
  - Edema, abnormal accumulation of fluid in the interstitium, manifesting as swelling
    - Peripheral edema, edema in peripheral body parts such as limbs and feet
    - Pulmonary edema, edema in the lungs that impairs breathing
  - Congestive heart failure, heart failure resulting in congestion in one or more organs
  - Nasal congestion, the blockage of nasal passages due to swollen membranes
  - Pelvic congestion syndrome, chronic pelvic pain believed to be caused by enlarged veins in the lower abdomen
  - Prostatic congestion, a medical condition that happens when the prostate becomes swollen by excess fluid
- Vasocongestion or vascular congestion, the not necessarily detrimental swelling of bodily tissue caused by increased vascular blood flow and a localized increase in blood pressure
- Congestion of the brain, an obsolete diagnosis for a variety of conditions including cerebral hemorrhage, seizures, depression, and headaches

== Other uses ==
- Network congestion, reduced quality of service when a network is carrying more data than it can handle
- Traffic congestion, vehicles clogging streets and highways
- Transmission congestion, when an electric power grid is unable to transfer power from one area to another as a result of physical or organizational limits of the transmission infrastructure
- Congestion pricing, a system of surcharging users of public goods that are subject to congestion through excess demand
- Congestion game, a class of game in game theory that often represents many of the above items
