= Qiui =

Chinese sex toy manufacturer

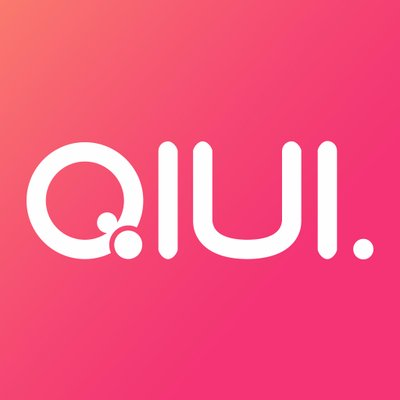
- Company type: Private
- Founded: c. 2019
- Headquarters: Foshan, Guangdong, China
- Area served: Worldwide via distributors
- Products: Sex toys
- Website: www.qiuitoys.com

Qiui is a Chinese company that manufactures internet-connected sex toys, including chastity cages and electrostimulation devices.

The company's most famous product is the Cellmate, a Bluetooth-controlled chastity cage which communicates with the Internet via a mobile app. When locked, the cage is held closed by a locking pin. In normal operation, the locking pin can only be released by a small electric motor that is controlled by an onboard micro-controller.

== Security vulnerability ==
In October 2020, a group of security researchers revealed that the Cellmate's API could be exploited to reveal user data and locations, as well as remotely lock devices, thus trapping the user's penis. Qiui released an updated version of the app, and suggested that affected users contact their support team, or break the device open with a screwdriver.
