= Piss / Carnation =

British experimental theatrical duo

piss / Carnation ("carnation" stylised in all caps) is a British experimental theatrical duo formed by Charli Cowgill and Laurie Ward. The company stages plays that focus on transgender lives and issues. Their 2025 play Ugly Sisters that re-tells the meeting between public intellectual Germaine Greer and a trans woman won several awards.

== History ==
piss / Carnation was formed by two trans women, Charli Cowgill and Laurie Ward. The troupe stages experimental theatrical works inspired by queer theory. The duo performed in the Edinburgh Fringe Festival circuit during 2023, where their show 52 Monologues for Young Transsexuals was given a four star review in The Guardian. The critic Kate Wyver described the two's collected experiences as "brutally revealing and beautifully soft". Cowgill and Ward interviewed a large number of trans women and compiled their experiences into a dramatic re-telling of their thoughts about life. The play featured spit collected at the start by audience members that was thrown at them during the performance.

In 2025, the troupe staged Ugly Sisters at the Underbelly Cowgate Theatre in Edinburgh. The play variously re-imagines, with varying outcomes, a meeting between the trans-exclusionary radical feminist writer Germaine Greer and a trans woman who had thanked Greer for her feminist writing. Following the meeting, Greer wrote an article titled, On Why Sex Change is a Lie in 1989, sections of which were read aloud during the performance. In a four star review of the play for The List, Dominic Corr considered it to be passionate, empathetic, and unapologetic. Further reviews considered the production sophisticated, and the performances to be vivid. Ugly Sisters won the Binge Fringe Queer Performer's Award, and the Edinburgh Untapped Award in 2024.

From 10 November until 12 December 2026, the duo staged an adaptation of Orlando: A Biography (1928) by Virginia Woolf at the New Diorama Theatre. The adaptation, titled Orlando: A Pornobiography, is performed by five transfeminine actresses and features the titular character masturbating for ten years in a goon cave to sissy pornography. Cowgill described their play as an "anti-adaptation". piss / Carnation have also staged their theatrical work at the Soho Theatre and Camden People's Theatre.
