= Sexual frustration =

Frustration resulting from lack of desired sexual activity

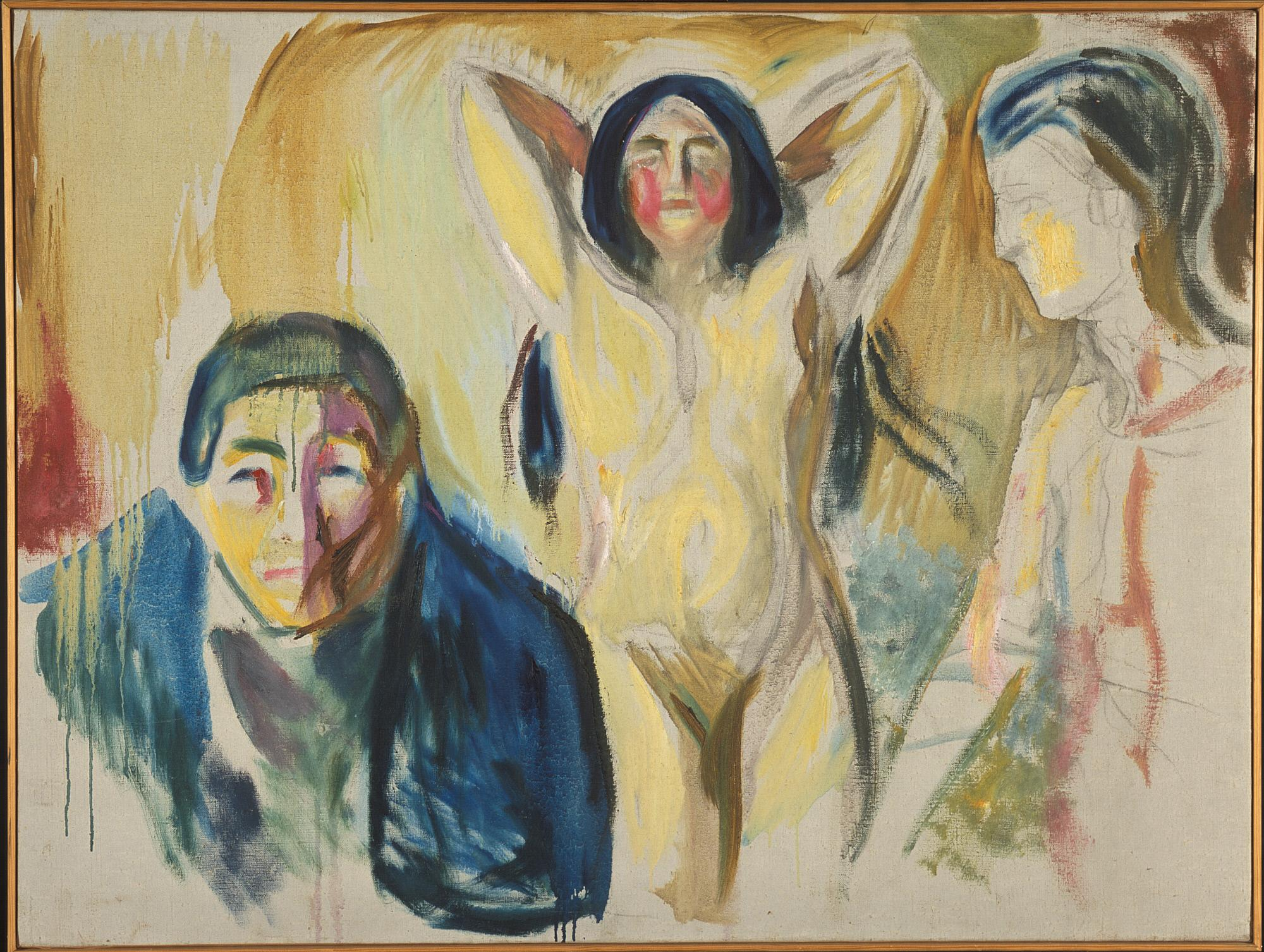
Painting by Edvard Munch depicting sexual frustration

Sexual frustration is a sense of dissatisfaction stemming from a discrepancy between a person's desired and achieved sexual activity. It may result from physical, legal, mental, emotional, social, financial, religious or spiritual barriers. It can derive from displeasure during sex due to issues such as anorgasmia, anaphrodisia, premature ejaculation, delayed ejaculation or erectile dysfunction. A sense of incompatibility or discrepancy in libido between partners may be involved. It may also relate to broader existential frustration.

Sexual frustration can potentially have a number of consequences, and like other frustrations, can increase the risks of aggression, violence, or crime. Some mass shooters and other criminals have cited sexual frustration as one reason for their anger.

Historical methods of dealing with sexual frustration have included fasting and the taking of libido suppressants such as anaphrodisiacs (food supplements) or antaphrodisiacs (medicinal supplements). It can also affect the sexually active, especially hypersexual people. It is a natural stage of the development throughout youth, when going through puberty as a teenager.

Ways to cope with sexual frustration include masturbating, meditating, exercising, exploring new techniques, discussing and being open with one's partner about sexual frustrations, or seeking professional assistance through a sex therapist.

== Adolescents ==
Adolescents may experience sexual frustration due to a variety of factors, including societal or religious expectations, hormonal changes, and the complexities of navigating relationships. For some adolescents, sexting serves as an outlet for sexual exploration within a virtual space, particularly for those not yet ready for physical sexual activity.

== Menopause ==
During menopause, individuals may experience reduced sexual desire and activity. However, engaging in sex remains important for many older people. Couples in their 50s or older expect ongoing sexual involvement, with an emphasis on traditional intercourse over other forms. Common sexual dysfunctions, like ejaculatory issues in males and genital atrophy in females, pose challenges. Lack of awareness about these changes may hinder communication with partners, potentially leading to sexual frustration and abstinence.

== Sexual frustration's impact on aggression and crime ==
Sexual frustration has been identified as a factor contributing to immoral conducts throughout history. However, it is not prominently addressed in major criminological theories. This historical oversight can be attributed to misguided perspectives stemming from misconceptions that disregard female sexual frustration, misrepresent male biology, and fail to consider psychological and qualitative dimensions, including the option of masturbation.

Sexual frustration extends beyond individuals facing involuntary celibacy; it also affects those engaged in sexual activity. The frustration arising from unmet sexual desires, unavailability of partners, and unsatisfactory sexual experiences appears to heighten the risks of aggression, violence, and criminal tendencies associated with the pursuit of relief, power, revenge, and displaced frustration. While sexual frustration alone is not adequate to fully explain aggression, violence, or crime, recognizing its impact on behavior remains crucial.

== See also ==
- Edging (sexual practice)
- Erotic sexual denial
- Orgastic potency
- Sexual abstinence
- Sexual tension
- Incel
