= Gooning =

Sexual practice involving extreme edging

Gooning is a sexual practice and subculture associated with extreme edging to achieve a euphoric state that is sometimes called a "goon state", usually while consuming large amounts of pornography. Gooning is practiced either alone or with others, and some gooners use specially fitted-out rooms called "goon caves".

The terms "gooning" and "gooners" have become slang among Generation Z and Generation Alpha. Gooners, who are mostly young men, use online communities such as Reddit and Discord, where gooning may occur as a group activity, and pornography and internet memes are shared among members. Gooners may experience negative health outcomes, such as erectile dysfunction and addiction, due to the practice.

== Etymology ==
The terms "gooning" and "gooner" have appeared on the internet since the early 2000s, possibly originating on the online imageboard 4chan. The term is a reference to stupid, single-minded characters in Popeye comics, or a to a slang term for a simple-minded person. The word also has been related to the "undignified" facial and bodily expressions gooners display during their practice. The terms have gained popularity among Generation Z and Generation Alpha users of TikTok and other social media platforms, and their meanings have broadened to include elevated excitement of any kind.

== History ==
The practice of gooning began speculatively on 4chan in the early 2000s; participants were mostly masculine gay men. The earliest definition of "gooning" on Urban Dictionary was written in 2005. As gooning spread, it was influenced by the pornography addiction fetish community on Tumblr in the late 2000s, growing to include a wider demographic. Interest in gooning grew more rapidly after the onset of the COVID-19 pandemic, spiking in 2023, according to Google Trends.

In 2025, Clips4Sale named gooning the 2026 Fetish of the Year, citing a 151% increase in sales of gooning content since 2023. Goonen, the German-language word for gooning, was nominated for the Youth Word of the Year in Germany in 2025, losing to das crazy by 0.2% of the vote.

== Practice ==
The goal of gooning is to achieve a "goon state", a state described as trance-like, euphoric, and meditative, with one source comparing it to ego death. According to sexuality researcher Jason Armstrong: "Gooning is considered to be that moment during a bate [masturbation session] when porn is no longer necessary, when the connection to the penis is all that's required to reach an almost frightening height of sexual ecstasy." During a "goon session", many practitioners contort their faces, slacken their jaws or drool; sometimes sticking out their tongues and crossing their eyes. Some gooners may babble or chant penis-related affirmations, which have been compared to mantras. Gooners heavily focus on the penis in sexual activities, which one researcher describes as bordering on "phallomania". Some use party drugs like poppers or Adderall to heighten the experience. Gooning sessions can continue for hours or, in extreme cases, for days.

Gooners tend to use pornography compulsively, the addiction often being part of the activity's appeal. Some sources define gooning as the fetishization of pornography addiction. Pornography is not required for gooning to occur. There is also an element of sexual submission; some gooners seek sources that humiliate them for their addiction. Some practitioners, particularly bi-curious heterosexual men, use gooning as an opportunity to explore queer sexuality.

Many gooners construct a "goon cave", a room designed specifically for the practice. These often contain computer monitors that simultaneously display multiple streams of pornography. They may use physical pornographic media such as magazines and posters, and sex toys. Pornographic music videos, consisting of many short video clips with techno music in the background, are popular with the community as "bate fuel".

Gooning may be a solo activity, though many gooners participate in group sessions, often on video calls or otherwise organized online, where participants simultaneously masturbate to the same content. Many communities also conduct in-person gooning meetups. Some couples have incorporated "mutual edging" as a shared sexual practice.

=== Community ===
Gooners congregate in online communities; gooning-related subreddits garner millions of users and Discord servers host tens of thousands. Many gooners share internet memes among themselves, on platforms such as X, and have a set of shared gooning-related terms and inside jokes. Some gooner communities share "triggers"; animated gif images or other short-form pornographic content that makes the viewer want to start a goon session.

According to a 2025 survey by the blog ZipHealth, a quarter of American adults have gooned at some point, men being twice as likely to have done so than women. A 2024 survey of several English-speaking subreddits and Discord servers found almost three quarters of self-identified gooners were cisgender men, primarily from the United States and Europe, over 95% of whom were between the ages of 18 and 25, and more than 60 percent identified themselves as bisexual. In another survey of gooners, 40% said they were sexually active, although the majority identified as "pomosexual", meaning they substitute sex with pornography. The majority of gooners are male; female gooners are called "goonettes".

== Negative effects ==
Excessive gooning can lead to erectile dysfunction during intercourse, which is thought to be because sexual intercourse is less stimulating than gooning, and practitioners can become reliant on pornography to become aroused. It can also lead to dulling of the sexual pleasure response, resulting in the need for more stimulation to achieve the same effect. Some gooners report difficulty dating with their fetish, and infidelity. According to one family psychotherapist, this is a particular concern in young people and may impact social development.

A trend among some gooners, called "nut-and-dash", "tagging", or "cum sharking", involves sexually assaulting strangers, usually women, by masturbating publicly and then ejaculating on or wiping semen on them, often in Dollar Tree stores. In 2026, a woman who was subjected to this practice at the Clairemont, San Diego, Dollar Tree store brought a lawsuit against one of these gooners. The suit alleged at least 11 other women across the United States have also been victims.

== See also ==
- Autosexuality – Sexual orientation as attraction to oneself
- Jerk off instruction – Pornography genre
- Internet addiction disorder – Excessive internet usage that causes psychological disorders
- Tantric sex – Sexual practices associated with Hindu and Buddhist tantra
