= FetLife =

Adult social networking website

- Screenshot
- Website type: Adult social networking
- Available in: English, Catalan, Dutch, French, German, Italian, Norwegian, Polish, Portuguese, Spanish
- Founded: January 3, 2008; 18 years ago
- Headquarters: Vancouver, British Columbia, Canada
- Founder: John Kopanas
- Parent: BitLove, Inc.
- Website: fetlife.com
- Registration: Required
- Users: 12,632,253
- Current status: Active
- Written in: Ruby on Rails

FetLife is a social networking website that serves people interested in BDSM, fetishism, and kink. It distinguishes itself from competitors by emphasizing itself as a social network rather than a dating site.

== History ==
FetLife was launched on January 3, 2008, by John Kopanas (also known by his username John Baku), a software engineer in Montreal, Quebec. Frustrated by attempts to find women who had the same sexual interests as he did, Baku created a website in 2007 called "FriendsWithFetishes". While working on release 2.0 of FriendsWithFetishes, Baku decided to launch it as a separate site and named it FetLife. James Golick served as chief technology officer. In 2009 Baku received the Community Choice (Man) Award as part of the Pantheon of Leather Awards.

In January 2017, FetLife deleted hundreds of groups – including anything with the words blood, needles, rape and incest – and temporarily shut down the ability to create new groups following pressure from their payment processor. The action by the payment processor was criticized by the Electronic Frontier Foundation as censorship.

== Features ==
All members have a profile with the option to display one or more sexual orientations, D/s roles and fetishes from respective lists. Profiles can also list relationships with other members.

Members can create and join groups which function as internet forums, send direct messages to one or more other members and advertise and organize events. Members can also post blog entries, photographs and videos, either publicly or only to members in the poster's friends list, along with comments on other members' posts.

The search feature is deliberately limited to prevent members from finding users with specific characteristics, such as age and gender, and blog posts can only be searched via tags specified by the poster.

== Controversies ==
In 2012, FetLife found itself at the center of a controversy regarding its policy that users pledge not to "make criminal accusations against another member in a public forum". This policy has been objected to by users on the basis that censoring posts of sexual assault victims that name predatory users prevents them from warning others. FetLife's reasoning behind this policy is that it allows users to accuse others of a crime, which could be libelous if the allegations are false or unprovable.

A BuzzFeed article accused the website of not doing enough to stop racism in 2020.

In March 2026, a lawsuit named FetLife as the initiating website for a sextortion scheme against a U.S. military veteran for £2,000, beginning in November 2025.

=== Murders of Christine Banfield and Joseph Ryan ===
In 2023, Brendan Banfield of Herndon, Virginia, created a fake FetLife account in the name of his wife Christine to lure a Washington, D.C., man named Joseph Ryan to the Banfield's home under false pretenses as part of a plot to murder Banfield's wife, Christine. The event culminated in the double homicide of Christine and Ryan, of which Brendan Banfield and the family's Brazilian au pair, Juliana Peres Magalhães, were later convicted.
