= Chastity piercing =

Type of genital piercing

Chastity piercings are types of genital piercings that can be used to impose chastity in males and females.

== Gallery ==
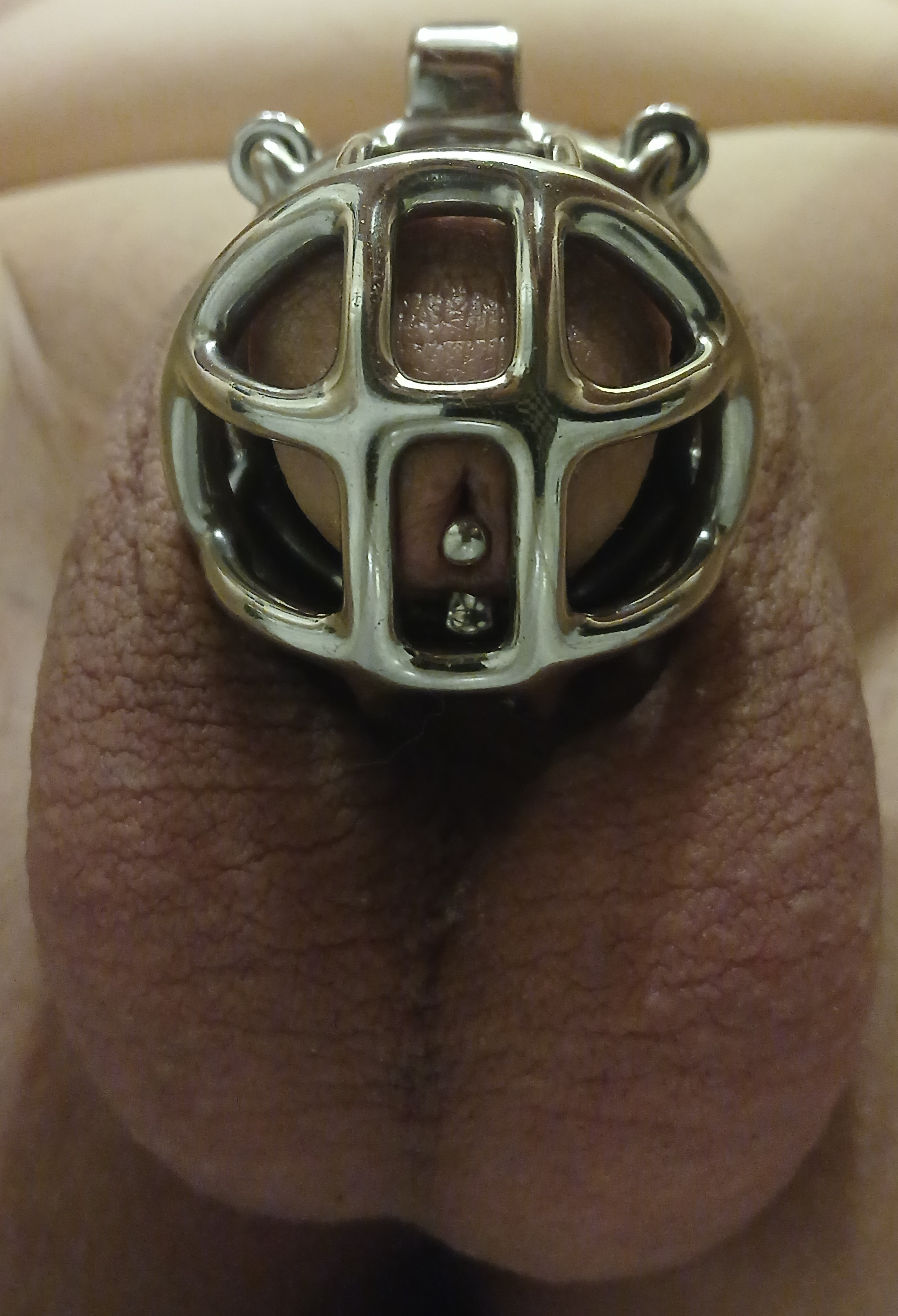
A chastity cage with an integrated piercing hook

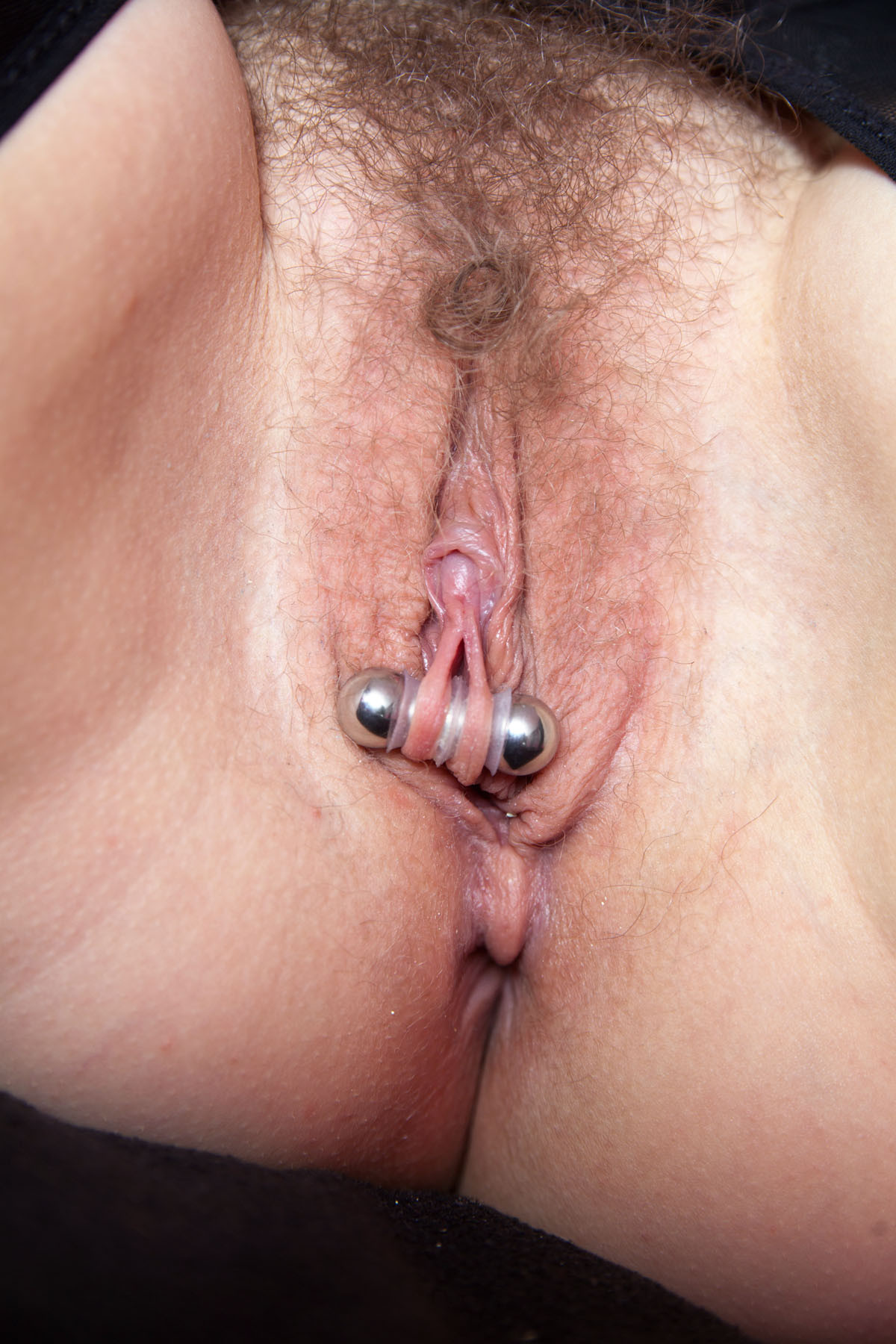
Pierced inner labia with chastity piercing

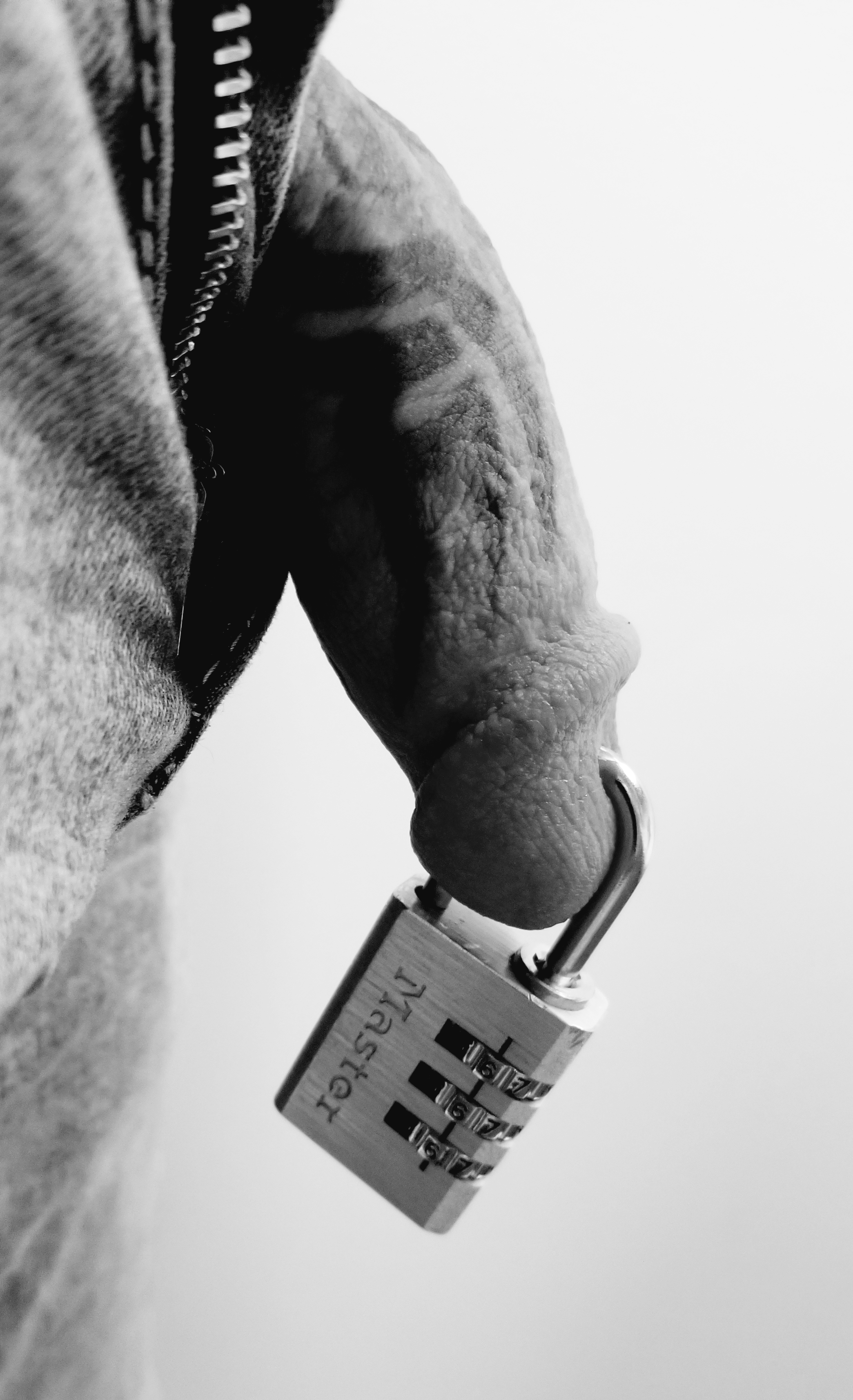
Lock inserted through a piercing in a penis

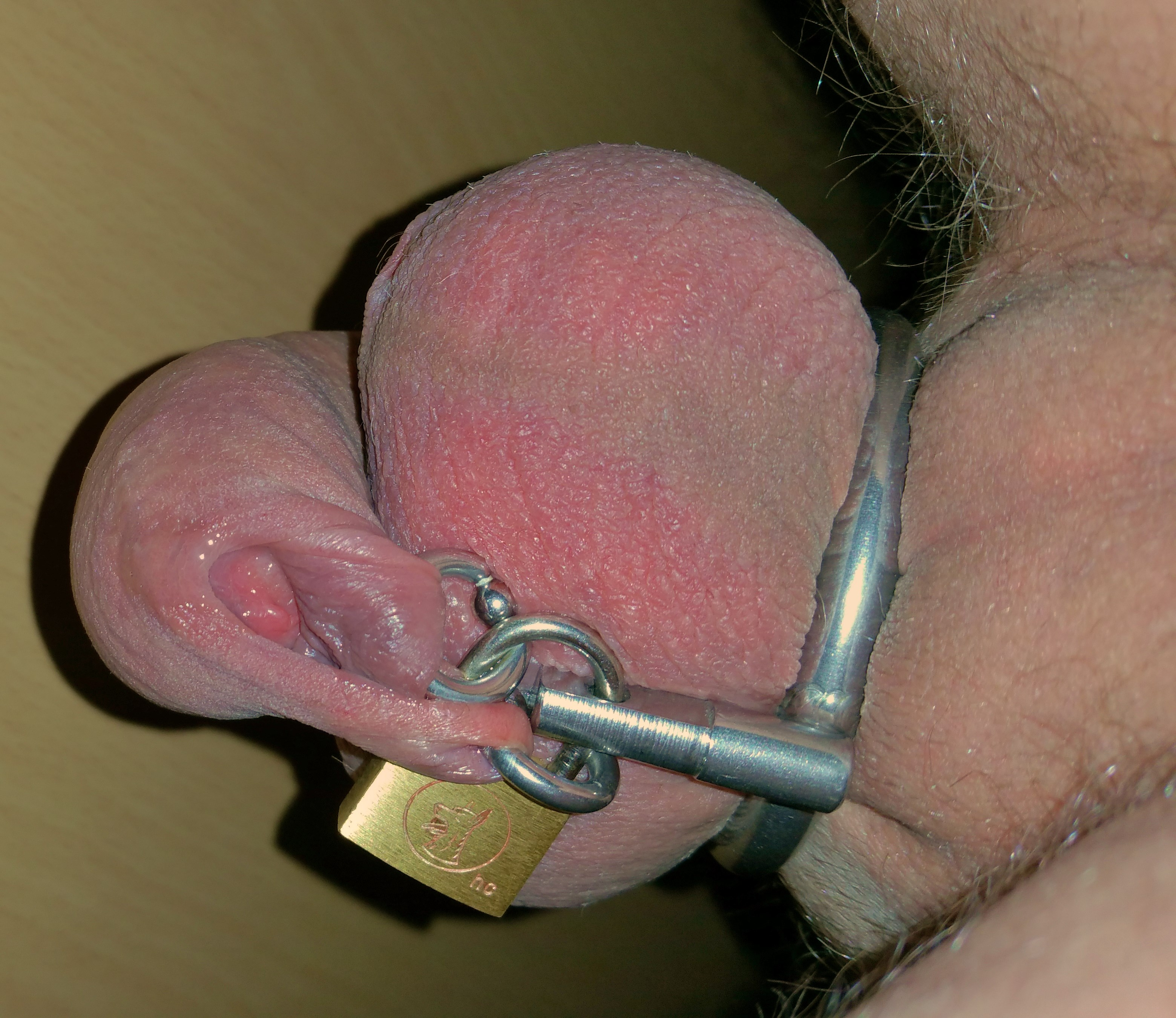
Foreskin chastity

== See also ==
- Chastity belt (BDSM)
- Breast torture
- Cock and ball torture
- Erotic sexual denial
- Erotic humiliation
- Genital piercing
