= Prostatic congestion =

Medical condition of the prostate gland

Prostatic congestion is a medical condition of the prostate gland that happens when the prostate becomes swollen by excess fluid and can be caused by prostatitis. The condition often results in a person with prostatic congestion feeling the urge to urinate frequently. Prostatic congestion has been associated with prostate disease, which can progress due to age. Oftentimes, the prostate will grow in size which can lead to further problems, such as prostatitis, enlarged prostate, or prostate cancer.

Prostatic congestion is commonly observed in individuals between the ages of 20 and 40 years. It can however occur at any age. Chronic prostatitis is one of the main causes of this condition and this occurs when there is accumulation of fluid that can lead to swelling of the prostate that can therefore lead to congestion. Other possible causes of prostatic congestion include benign prostatic hyperplasia, prostate cancer, urinary tract cysts, and infrequent ejaculations.

Symptoms are often patient-specific, and diagnosis includes a workup and a digital rectal examination. Individuals are often referred to a urologist for further examination.

Treatments identified for prostatic congestion include mechanical treatments such as varicocele sclerotherapy, minimally invasive treatments, and alternative treatments such as massaging the prostate regularly, acupuncture combined with traditional Chinese medicine, dietary supplementation, exercise, and other therapies such as warm baths, local therapy with heating pads, and physical therapy. An alternative form of medicine called ayurveda is also used for treatment. Medical consultation is recommended before attempting these treatments.

== Possible causes of prostatic congestion ==
- Benign prostatic hyperplasia (BPH) – The testicular and prostatic veins are connected. According to Bernoulli's and Pascal's laws, fluid flowing through connected columns has the same pressure. BPH causes a destruction of spermatic veins, thereby increasing the hydrostatic pressure in these columns. Pressure in the testicles also becomes elevated, thereby causing a pressure gradient. As a result, free testosterone is diverted from the testicles into the prostate, thereby causing prostatic congestion.
- Chronic prostatitis (infection of the prostate) – An infection of the prostate can lead to the buildup of fluid due to the bodies natural defense mechanism leading to inflammation. Along with excessive fluid production, the fluid may also become thickened due to the active infection which can become harder to release into the urethra during ejaculation.
- Excessive drinking of alcoholic beverages – Although the exact mechanism in unknown, alcohol damages the prostate tissue just like it damages the nervous system and other organs. In a study conducted in rats split into four groups (normal rats, ethanol drinking rats, chronic non-bacterial prostatitis rats, ethanol drinking chronic non-bacterial prostatitis rats), prostate glands were exposed. Ethanol drinking chronic non-bacterial prostatitis rats showed the most prostatic congestion compared to other groups.
- Prostate cancer – A cancer that forms in tissues of the prostate that usually occurs in older adults. The prostate is a gland that is found under the rectum and below the bladder in the male reproductive system. Five randomized controlled trials were conducted to determine whether prostate cancer screening reduces mortality associated with prostate cancer where 341,342 participants within the age range of 45–80 years were included in the study. The results of the study were statistically insignificant between the screening group and the control group in all-cause mortality from prostate cancer. The results of the study were significant in the number of men diagnosed with advanced prostate between the screening group and the control group. The results of the study did not provide sufficient evidence on the quality of life in individuals diagnosed with prostate cancer, including urinary tract symptoms and prostatic congestion.
- Urinary tract cysts – A benign condition of the urinary bladder in which there is a change of the bladder mucosa-associated cysts formation. This change is usually a reactive inflammatory change.
- Infrequent ejaculations – Decreased ejaculation frequency can contribute to an accumulation of secretions within the prostate gland. As a result, the prostate may appear larger, tender, and inflamed, in addition to possible urinary disorders.

There is limited information available on prostatic congestion, as it has been commonly associated as a side effect or complication of other conditions, such as chronic prostatitis. Due to this, there are lifestyle factors that can influence the symptoms of such conditions due to their relation to prostatic congestions. In a nationwide epidemiological survey in China, it was found that an increase in alcohol consumption was related to an increase in symptoms of discomfort or pain from their chronic prostatitis. This was due to the understanding that alcohol in circulation can exacerbate prostatic congestion, contributing to such symptoms. The prostate is sensitive to alcohol, therefore, alcohol consumption can also increase how severe the congestion may be. This is because acetaldehyde, a breakdown product of ethanol, can lead to vasodilation and therefore prostate congestion and cause inflammation.

== Signs and symptoms ==
=== Common symptoms ===
Symptoms vary depending on the cause of the prostatic congestion.

- Lower back, groin, or abdomen pain
- Pain or discomfort around the penis or testicles
- Swelling or enlargement of the prostate
- Difficulty urinating
- Frequent urination or nocturia
- Dysuria – pain during urination
- Prostate palpitations
- Tender prostate gland

In addition to these symptoms, prostatitis can be a complication of recurrent prostatic congestion. In cases where an individual engages in minimal sexual activities resulting in reduced ejaculation frequency, there can be an accumulation of secretion leading to prostatic congestion. This can block the prostatic ducts, ultimately increasing the person's risk of developing prostatitis.

=== Serious symptoms ===
If an individual experiences the following symptoms, it is highly encouraged to seek medical attention for a proper diagnosis.

- Fever coupled with difficulty urinating
- Loss of ability to urinate
- Severe pain
- Blood found in urine

== Diagnosis ==
A workup is an important factor for diagnosis since symptoms can vary and are patient-specific. One exam that is performed is a digital rectal examination to examine the prostate. The doctor may refer the individual to another doctor that specializes in urinary tract disease, also known as a urologist. A urologist may perform additional tests such as a prostate-specific antigen (PSA) blood test or a bladder pressure testing. Imaging tests such as transrectal ultrasound and magnetic resonance imaging (MRI) might also be performed. Although prostatitis does not increase the risk of prostate cancer, a prostate biopsy may be performed.

== Treatment ==
=== Mechanical treatments ===
==== Varicocele sclerotherapy ====
Since the testicular and prostatic veins are connected, backflow of fluid from the testicular veins can cause fluid to be backed up into the prostate. Varicocele sclerotherapy is a procedure that seals off veins that contain a lot of fluid and redirects blood flow through other veins, thereby relieving fluid backed up to the prostate. A study with 36 participants aged 40–80 was conducted, and the results were statistically significant in that varicocele sclerotherapy helps relieve pressure on the prostate, thereby relieving prostatic congestion.

=== Minimally invasive treatments ===
Although there are not many studies on this, due to expense and lack of support from healthcare systems, minimally invasive therapies include a form of heating the prostate. A needle is inserted directly into the prostate, or, a catheter, endoscope, or probe is inserted into the urethra. There are two types of heating: low energy and high energy. Low-energy heating includes using laser, microwave, or electrical methods, and high energy includes vaporization of the prostatic tissue. Vaporization usually requires anesthesia.

=== Alternative treatments ===
==== Massaging prostate regularly ====
Physicians have recommended massaging the prostate regularly to reduce congestion in the prostate. In 1980, a study was conducted in which participants were given 10 sessions of prostate massages in 3–4 weeks and hyperplasia (enlargement of an organ) was reduced in almost all participants. Massaging the prostate causes a release of accumulated fluids. This method has been historically used as a treatment for prostatitis, as prostatic congestion has been commonly associated with prostatitis.

There is still limited information available on prostatic congestion treatment, however, there have been studies that combined therapies to address prostatic congestion in the presence of prostatitis. For example, the combination of antibiotics and prostatic massage was found to help relieve chronic pelvic pain syndromes in people with chronic prostatitis. This was based on the understanding that massage treatment has been previously shown to help relieve prostatic congestion.

==== Acupuncture combined with traditional Chinese medicine ====
Acupuncture combined with Chinese medicine can alleviate symptoms caused by prostate congestion and can be used as an effective treatment method for chronic prostatitis. A systematic review and meta-analysis published in 2021 used 19 randomized controlled trial studies with a total of 1831 cases to come to this conclusion. The results highlighted that acupuncture combined with traditional Chinese medicine could improve patients' urination symptoms, alleviate pain symptoms, and overall improve quality of life. In addition, results showed that with these alternative treatments there was no increase in adverse reactions.

==== Dietary supplements ====
Saw palmetto, a phytotherapeutic agent, has been shown to reduce prostatic congestion and urinary symptoms related to benign prostate hyperplasia. The exact mechanism is unknown however it is commonly believed to work by inhibiting the enzyme 5-alpha reductase that converts testosterone into dihydrotestosterone, its active metabolite. An individual with benign prostate hyperplasia may produce an excessive amount of dihydrotestosterone. Increase in dihydrotestosterone levels can lead to enlargement of the prostate since it plays a role in the hyperplasia of the prostate stomal and epithelial cells.

==== Medication ====
Bangshil and Fortege, two drugs that are part of an alternative medicine practice called Ayurveda, are sometimes used for prostatic conditions. Bangshil tablets contain herbal ingredients that some believe have antibacterial properties to help keep the prostate free of infection, while some of the ingredients found in Fortege are thought to help strengthen the genitourinary system. However, there is very little evidence that any Ayurveda treatment has significant antimicrobial effects or use in genitourinary conditions.

==== Exercise ====
Walking or performing regular exercise for 30 minutes a day, 5 times a week can help alleviate symptoms of an enlarged prostate or acute prostatitis that can lead to congestion. It can also help prevent the development of congestion in the prostate in the future and help reduce any pain experienced due to congestion.

==== Other ====
Other treatments can include warm baths, local heat therapy with heating pads, and physical therapy. Some examples of physical therapy would be pelvic muscle exercises which strengthen and relax muscles that hold the bladder in place. Myofascial release is a trigger point release which can also help in relieving pain symptoms. This includes pressing and stretching with a warming or cooling device the muscles in the lower back and pelvic area.
