= Sexual tension =

Unfulfilled sexual attraction between individuals

Sexual tension is a social phenomenon that occurs when two individuals interact and one or both feel sexual attraction, but the consummation is postponed or never happens.

A common scenario is where the two individuals function in proximity, such as co-workers or in a group of friends, but do not have sex to avoid awkwardness or for other reasons. Sexual tension often occurs between individuals when the relationship is close and often flirtatious, yet the people involved deny or repress their feelings for each other. Meanwhile, it can appear obvious to other friends or co-workers that such tension is present. When people with sexual tension have sex, the relationship can become complicated and awkward if a new type of relationship is not established, as the relationship that existed before is no longer valid.

Sexual tension can also occur when two individuals who have previously had sexual relations still feel an attraction towards each other, but do not wish to have sex again for fear of its effect on their current social situation—such as maintaining a relationship with a different partner. It can also be felt in situations when two individuals have a relationship devoid of physical contact, as in a long-distance relationship.

== In fiction ==
Sexual tension is a common feature in works of fiction. This longing is often suggested by incidents of intimacy; for example, when two characters are alone and in proximity (or actually touching), yet desire is never explicitly expressed. Another common theme is for characters to develop an interest in each other over the course of the story, and if this is expertly done, the audience can become aware of the growing attraction.

Sexual tension intensifies the audience's involvement with all characters involved. However, as several television series have discovered to their sorrow, tension dissipates when characters come together in sexual harmony. It is not like violence, which establishes the villain's credibility and makes the next round of jeopardy even more powerful. Instead, sexual fulfillment has the same effect on sexual tension that the death of the victim has on jeopardy.

== See also ==
- Sexual frustration
