= Clips4Sale =

Online pornographic media marketplace

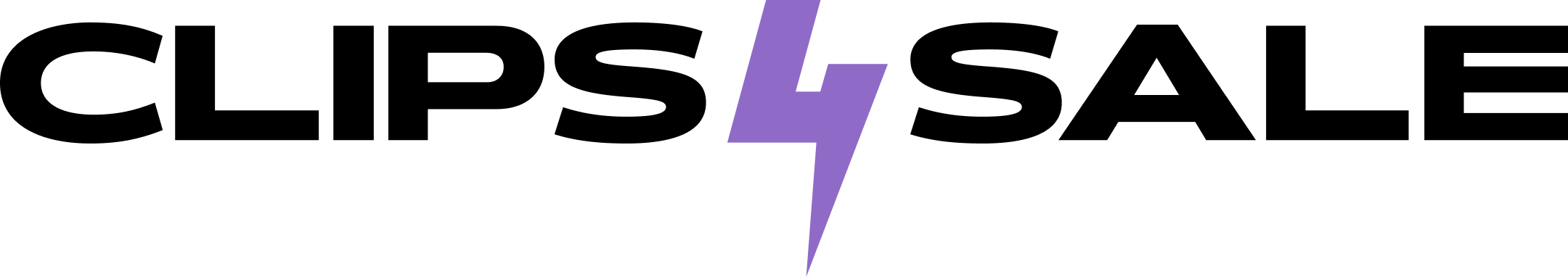
- Company type: Privately held company
- Website type: Pornographic video sharing
- Available in: English, German, Dutch, French, Spanish, Italian, Portuguese, Czech, Polish, Russian, Japanese
- Founded: July 22, 2003; 23 years ago
- Area served: Worldwide
- Industry: Sex
- Products: Downloadable video clips
- Services: Pornography
- Website: www.clips4sale.com
- Registration: Optional
- Launched: 2003; 23 years ago
- Current status: Online

Clips4Sale (C4S) is an online marketplace for adult video, specializing in fetish and kink content. Founded in 2003, it was an early platform for independent adult-content creators and studios to sell individual video clips directly to customers. It has hosted millions of clips across a wide range of niche categories, and has been described as one of the largest fetish-content platforms in the world.

In July 2026, Clips4Sale expanded beyond individual clip sales with the launch of the C4S+ subscription.

The company has been owned by Centro Ventures since 2021, when the company acquired the platform while retaining its existing operational team.

== Business model and operations ==
Clips4Sale operates as a marketplace of individual creator and studio storefronts. Creators and authorized resellers can set prices, while the platform provides distribution and payment processing. As of 2026, creators receive 60% of revenue from standard clip sales and 80% of customer tips. The platform also supports custom-video orders and subscription distribution through C4S+.

The service is operated in the US by Tropical Sun Corp. based in New Jersey. In the EU and UK it's operated by Tropical Sun Ltd. based in Limassol, Cyprus.

== Media coverage and fetish trends ==
Clips4Sale has been used by journalists to track changes in online fetish interests. In 2015, The Guardian analyzed metadata from about 4.8 million clips on the platform, dating back to 2003, to examine the growth of different fetish categories.

In the 2023, Vice repeatedly used Clips4Sale search and sales data in reporting on fetish trends. Later reports covered growing demand for jerk-off instruction and other fetish categories.

== Awards ==
Year	Award	Category
2011	Venus Award	Best Fetish Website
2014	XBIZ Award	Fetish Site of the Year
2015	AVN Award	Best Alternative Website
2020	XBIZ Award	Fetish Clip Site of the Year
2025	SNAP Award	Clip Site of the Year
