= Edging (sexual practice) =

Orgasm control technique

Edging (sometimes called surfing) is a sexual technique whereby an orgasm is controlled (that is, delayed or prevented). It is practiced alone or with a partner, and involves the maintenance of a high level of sexual arousal for an extended period of time without reaching climax. Orgasm control involves either sex partner being in control of the other partner's orgasm, or a person delaying their own orgasm during sexual activity with a partner or through masturbation. Any method of sexual stimulation can be used to experience controlled orgasm. When the controlled orgasm is achieved, the physical sensations are greater as compared to conventional orgasm. Orgasm control has also been referred to as "slow masturbation" and "extended massive orgasm".

Edging is distinct from edgeplay, a set of sexual practices. It is also distinct from premature ejaculation, retrograde ejaculation, or the inability to orgasm, all of which describe involuntary medical conditions. The term edging has been adopted by Generation Z and older Generation Alpha as brain rot terminology, gaining popularity on TikTok.

== In partnered sex ==
During intercourse or other forms of sexual stimulation with a partner, one person stimulates the other(s) and reduces the level of stimulation when approaching orgasm. Erotic sexual denial occurs when the partner who is in control of the other partner's orgasm prolongs the orgasm to allow for an increased level of sexual tension. When a partner eventually provides enough stimulation to achieve an orgasm, it may be stronger than usual due to increased tension and arousal that builds up during the extended stimulation. An example of the use of orgasm control in partnered sex can be seen in BDSM; the partner whose orgasm is being controlled (sometimes referred to as the submissive partner) can be tied up. This activity is sometimes called tie and tease.

== In masturbation ==
When done solo, edging involves masturbating up until reaching the plateau phase and prolonging it without release, which heightens the eventual orgasm. Gooning is "an extreme version of edging" in which practitioners attempt to enter a trance-like mental state that some people experience as a result of edging for extended periods of time, sometimes assisted by poppers. This activity is often accompanied and assisted by pornography usage. Gooning may include a community aspect, such as meet-ups or orgies.

== See also ==
- Blue balls (physical condition)
- Chastity belt (BDSM device)
- Compulsive sexual behaviour disorder (mental disorder)
- Coitus reservatus (masturbation technique)
- Delayed gratification (masturbation technique)
- Erotic sexual denial (masturbation technique)
- Eroto-comatose lucidity (masturbation technique)
- Forced orgasm (BDSM practice)
- Internet addiction (mental disorder)
- Loneliness epidemic (global increase in social isolation)
- Pornography addiction (mental disorder)
- Sensation play (BDSM practice)
- Sex addiction (mental disorder)
- Sex machine (masturbation device)
- Tantric sex (erotic and religious practice)
