= Erotic sexual denial =

Refraining from sexual experiences to increase erotic arousal

Erotic sexual denial is a form of sexual activity whereby sexual gratification for one or both partners is delayed or "denied" in order to increase erotic arousal or tension. It is commonly used as sex play within the context of a dominance and submission relationship, though it can also be a solo practice. When used in the context of dominance and submission, the dominant partner is often encouraged to prioritize their own sexual pleasure over that of their submissive partner. The submissive partner receives gratification from providing sexual pleasure to their partner and from the feelings of vulnerability and tension that come from having their own sexual pleasure controlled by another. The prohibited sexual experience can be narrowly or broadly defined for a specific or indeterminate length of time, depending on the practitioner. The experience withheld can be any favored or desired sexual activities, such as specific acts or positions, provided it is something the practitioner wants.

Orgasm control practices like edging are well-known varieties of erotic sexual denial in which a person is kept in a heightened state of sexual arousal for an extended length of time without orgasm. Edging often ends with a delayed orgasm, unlike the similar practice of orgasm denial which typically does not lead to orgasm. Chastity devices such as penile chastity cages, cock harnesses or chastity belts can be used as a physical barrier to restrict an individual's ability to self-pleasure during periods of sexual denial.

Though not necessary to practice tease and denial, some practitioners find that these devices heighten feelings of submissiveness and empowerment between partners. Another frequently mentioned variety is the use of dice or other games of chance by couples to determine how long a person is to be withheld oral or penetrative sex, etc., from their partner. Erotic sexual denial is commonly, but not exclusively, practiced in association with BDSM and sexual bondage.

== Denial practices ==
=== Tie and tease ===
Bondage techniques are commonly used to restrain the person being sexually denied, allowing them to experience their powerlessness more intensely.

=== Tease and denial ===
Tease and denial is a situation where a person is stimulated until they are close to orgasm, then stimulation is stopped, keeping the person on the brink of orgasm. It is sometimes referred to as "edging".

If orgasm still occurs after removal of stimulation, it typically brings less pleasure than usual, and is considered a "ruined orgasm", as opposed to being a "denied orgasm" (which can sometimes lead to epididymal hypertension for both men and women).

=== Total denial ===
The practice of total sexual denial usually includes total avoidance of genital stimulation to the penis or vulva. This often involves the use of a physical barrier or device, such as a chastity belt or cage. Chastity belts or similar locking devices are available for all genders.

== Gallery ==
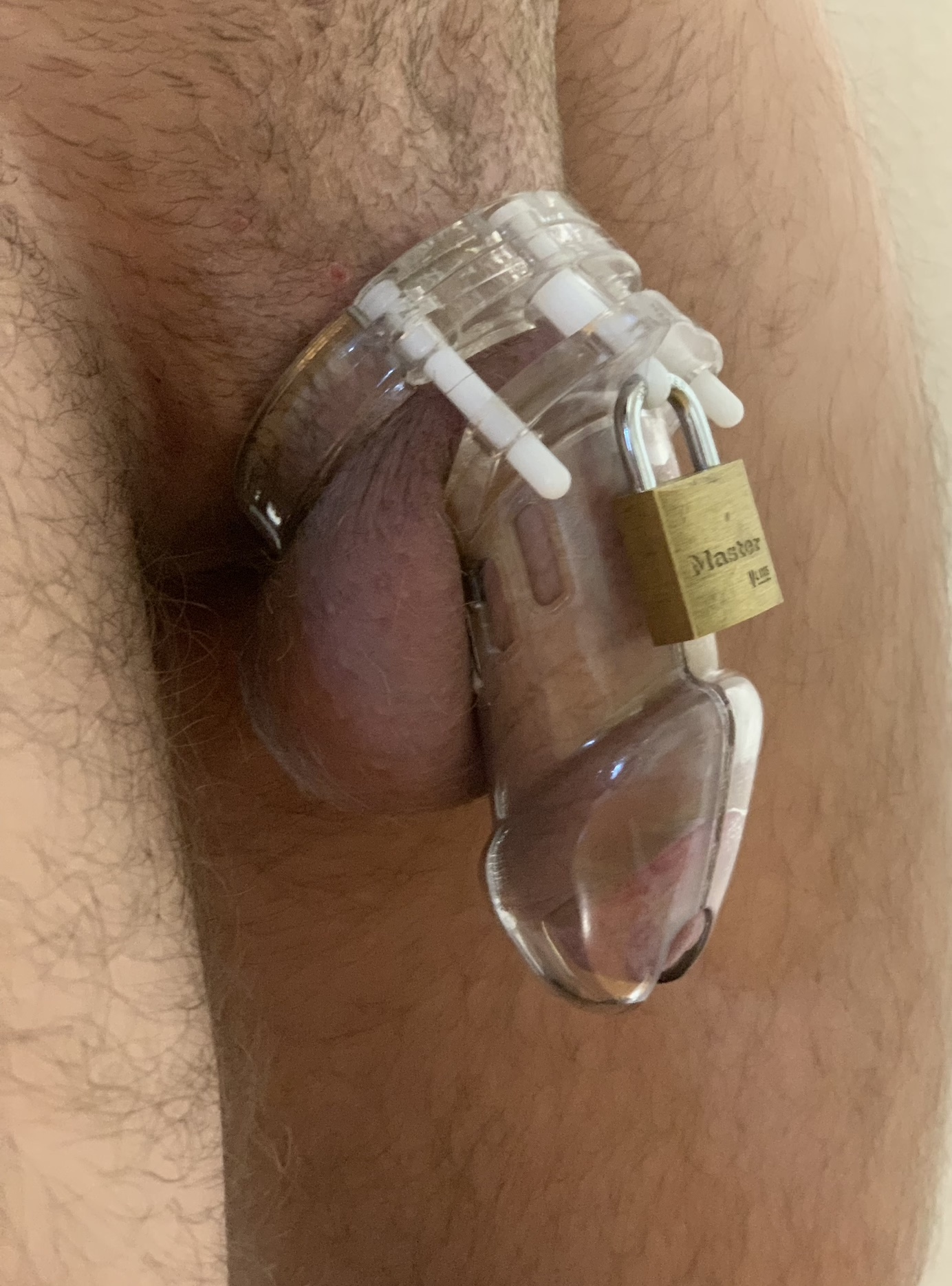
A commonly used type of chastity cage made of plastic

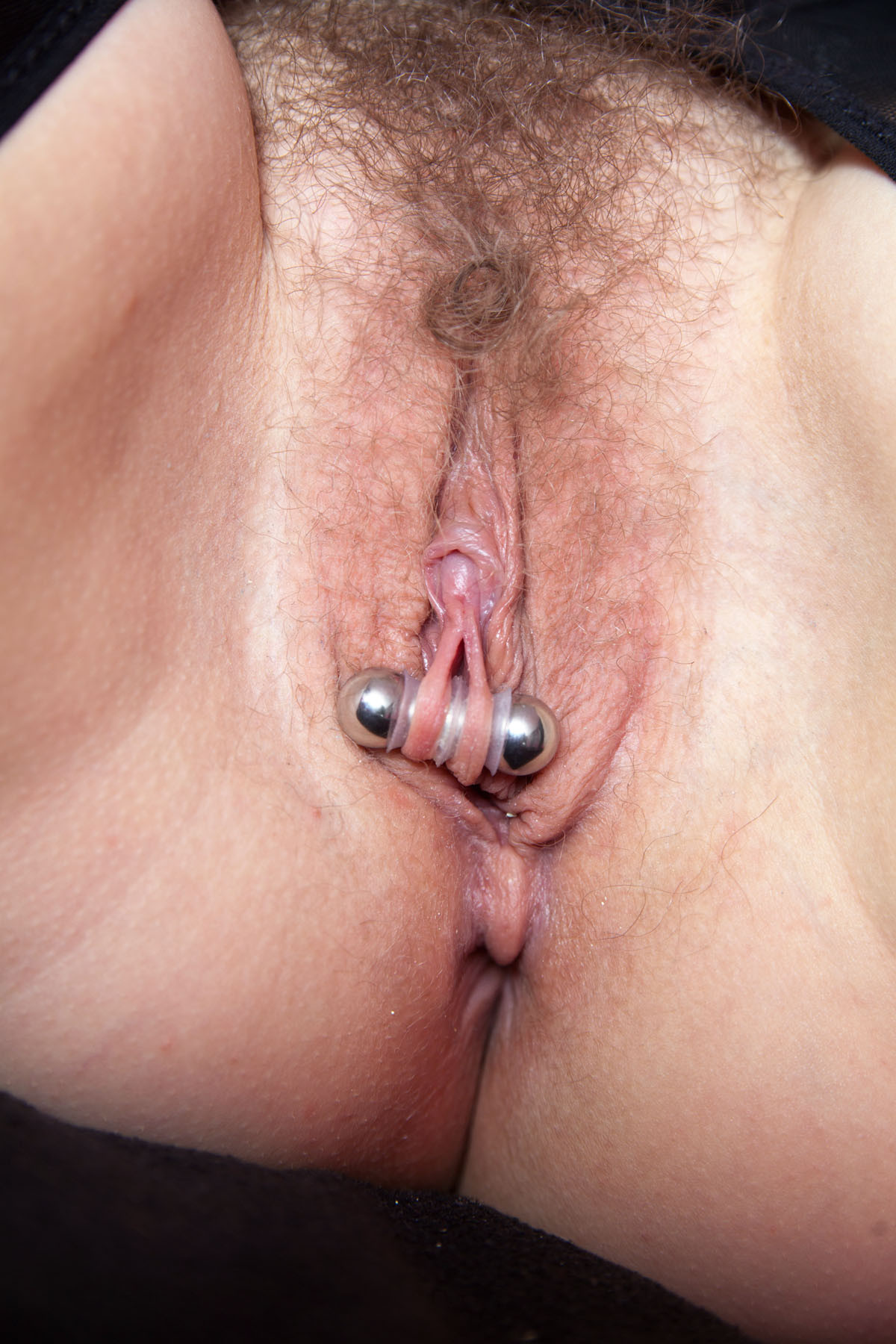
Pierced inner labia with chastity piercing

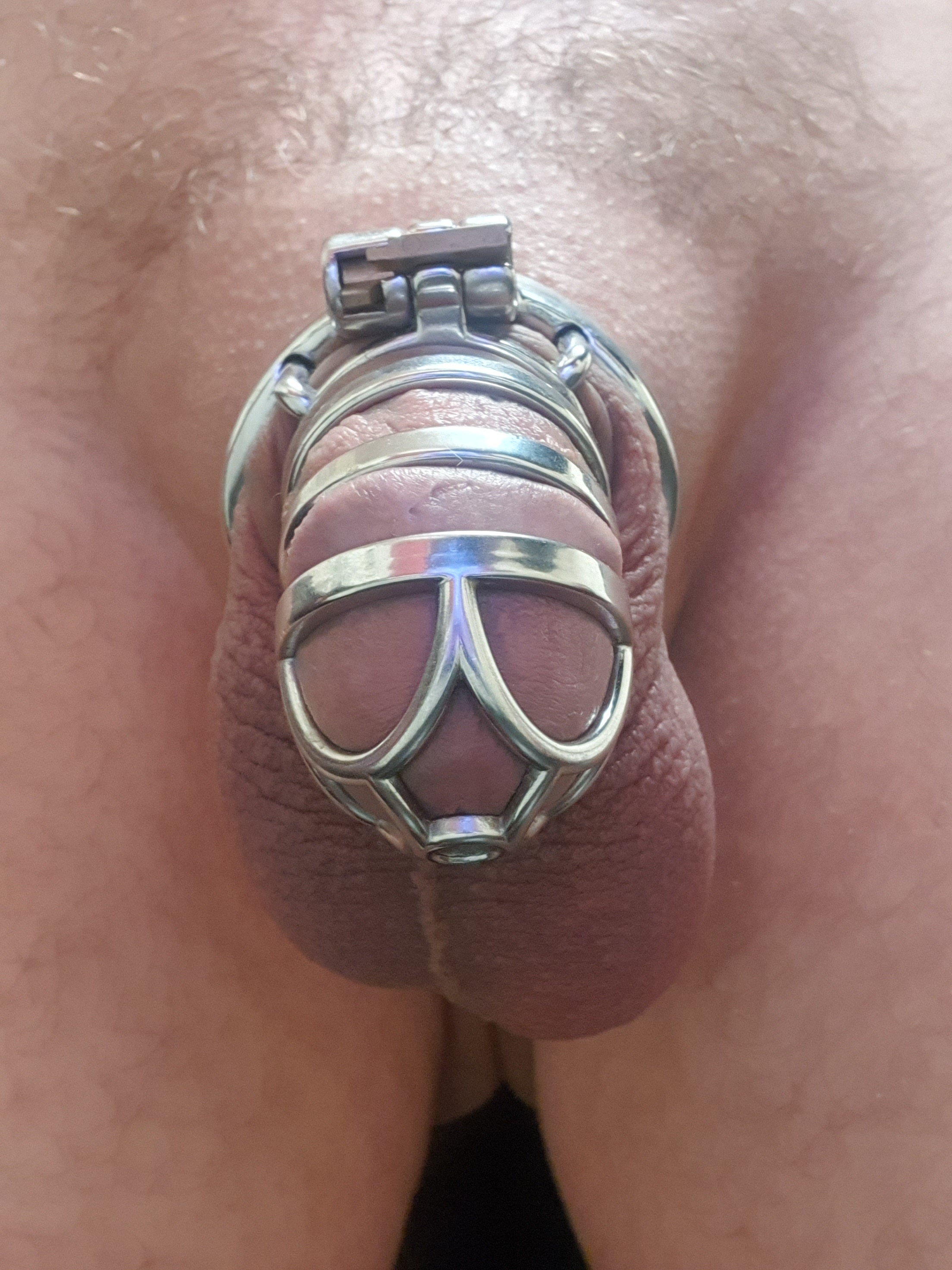
A metal type cock cage, using an integrated lock instead of the standard padlock

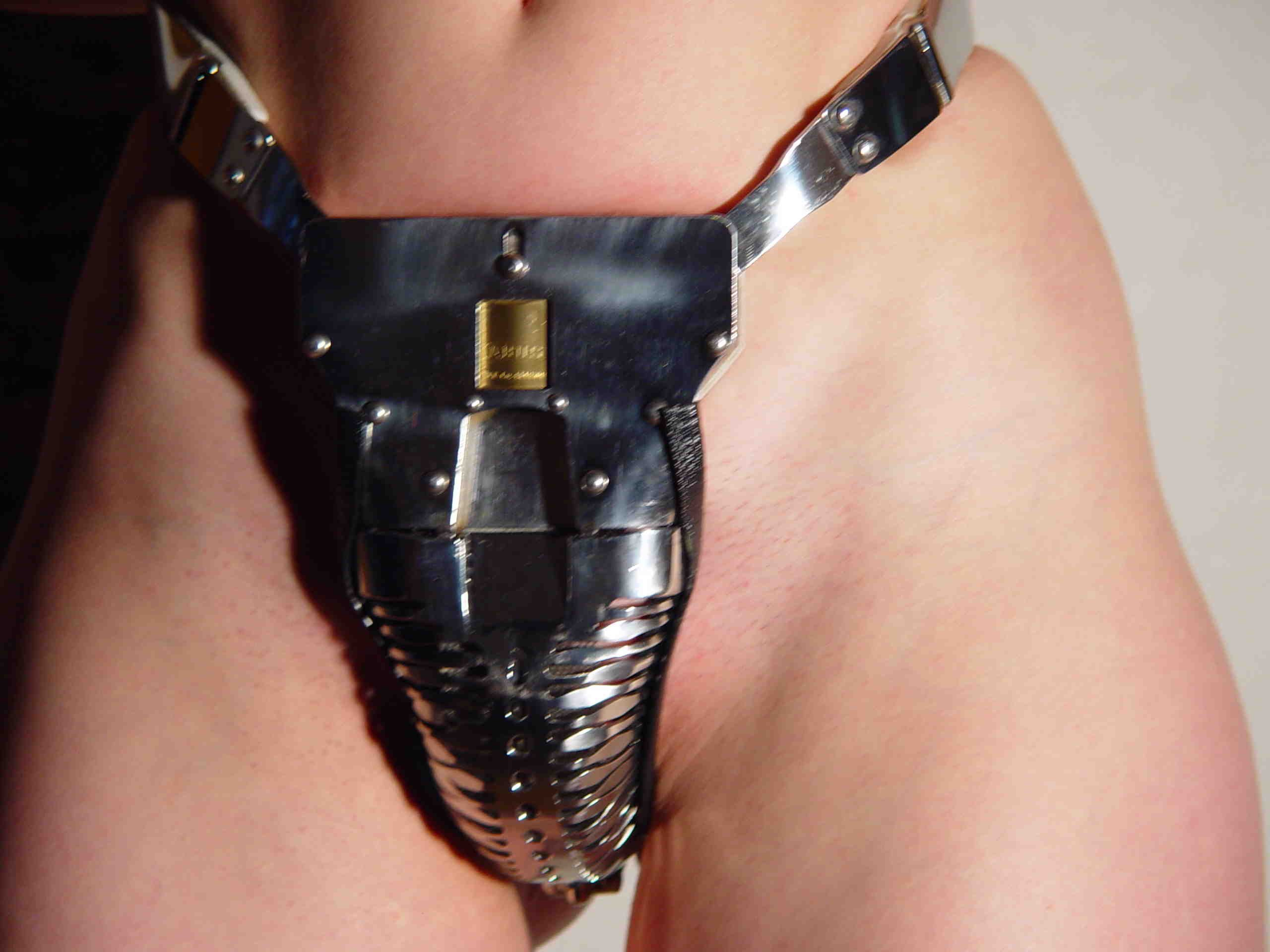
Female chastity belt

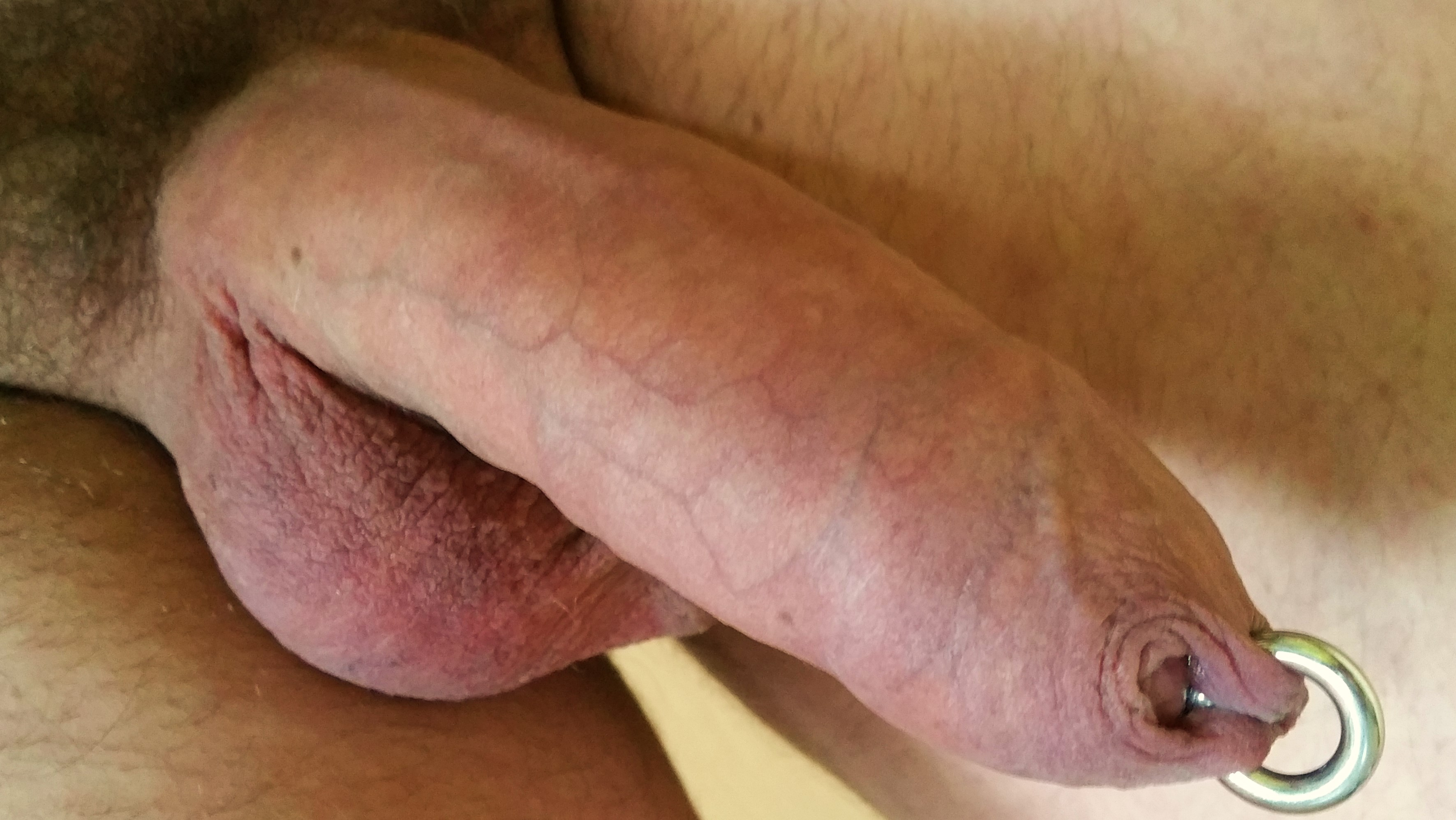
Penis with Chastity piercing

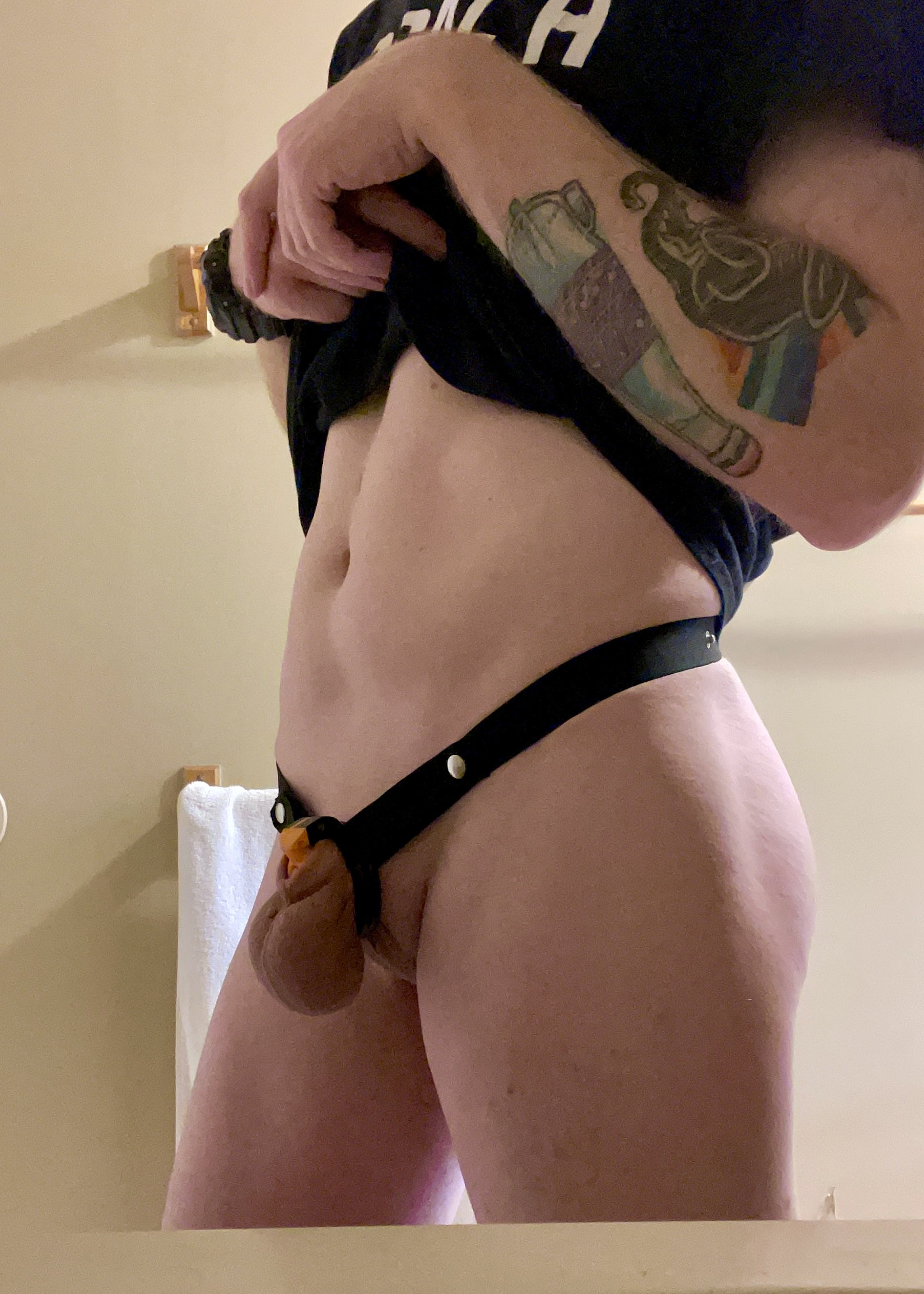
A custom 3D printed chastity cage

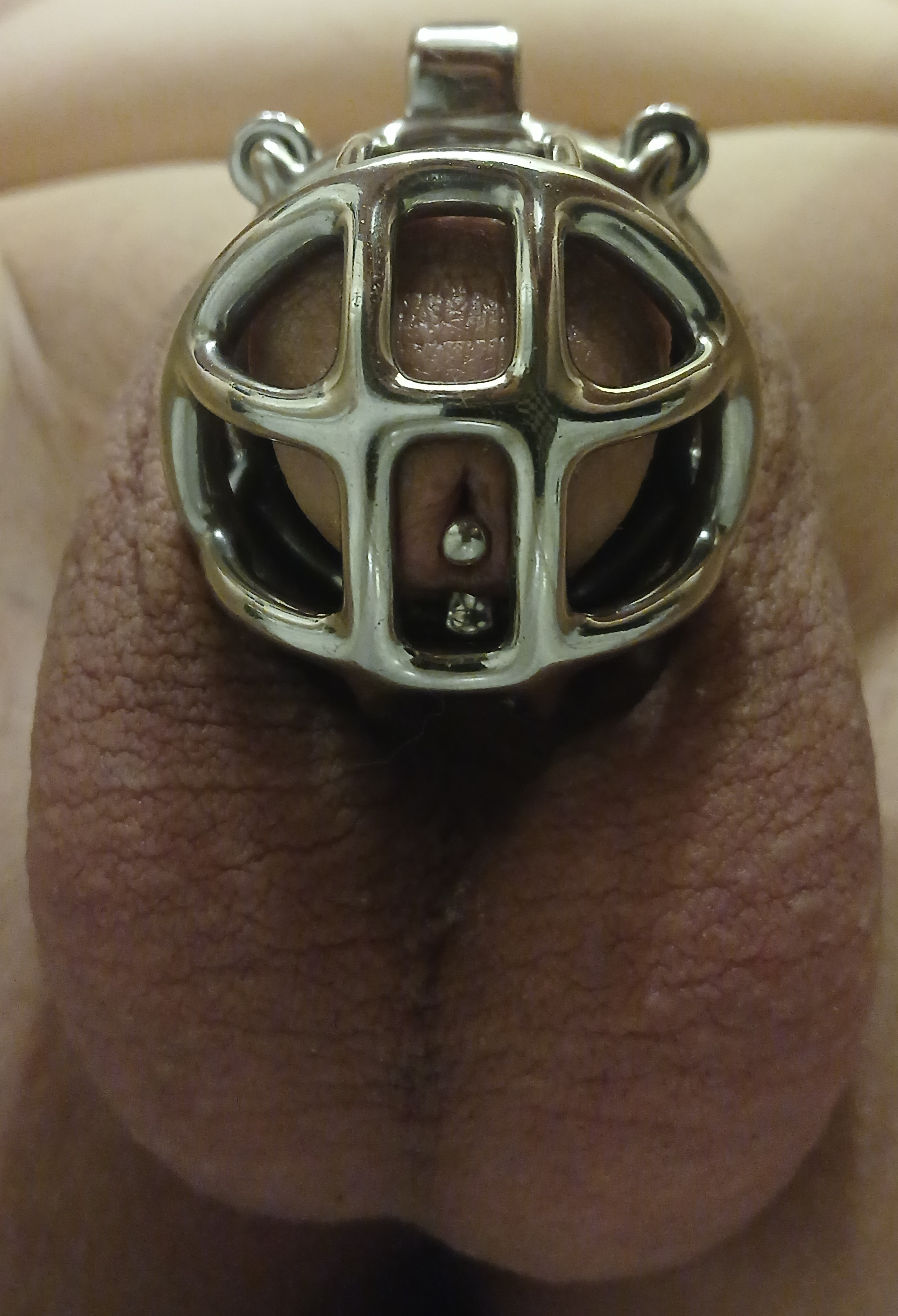
A chastity cage with an integrated chastity piercing hook

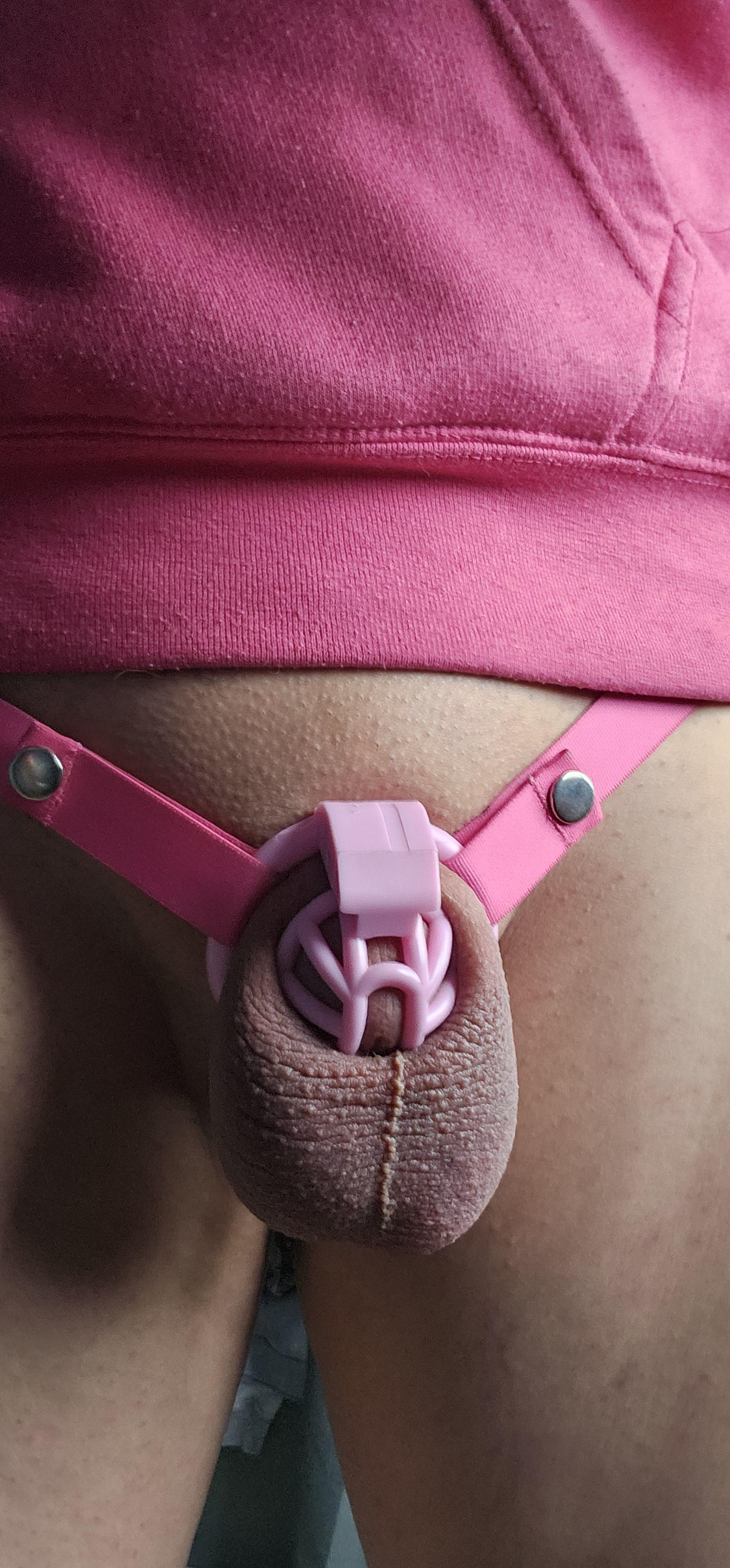
A Micro Chastity Cage, Pink, With A Support Strap.

== See also ==
- Coitus reservatus
- Cuckold fetishism
- Cuckquean
- Delayed ejaculation – Male inability or persistent difficulty in achieving orgasm
- Dominatrix
- Erotic humiliation
- Eroto-comatose lucidity — a form of erotic sexual denial
- Forced feminization
- Forced orgasm
