= Chastity belt (BDSM) =

Device to prevent sexual activity in BDSM play

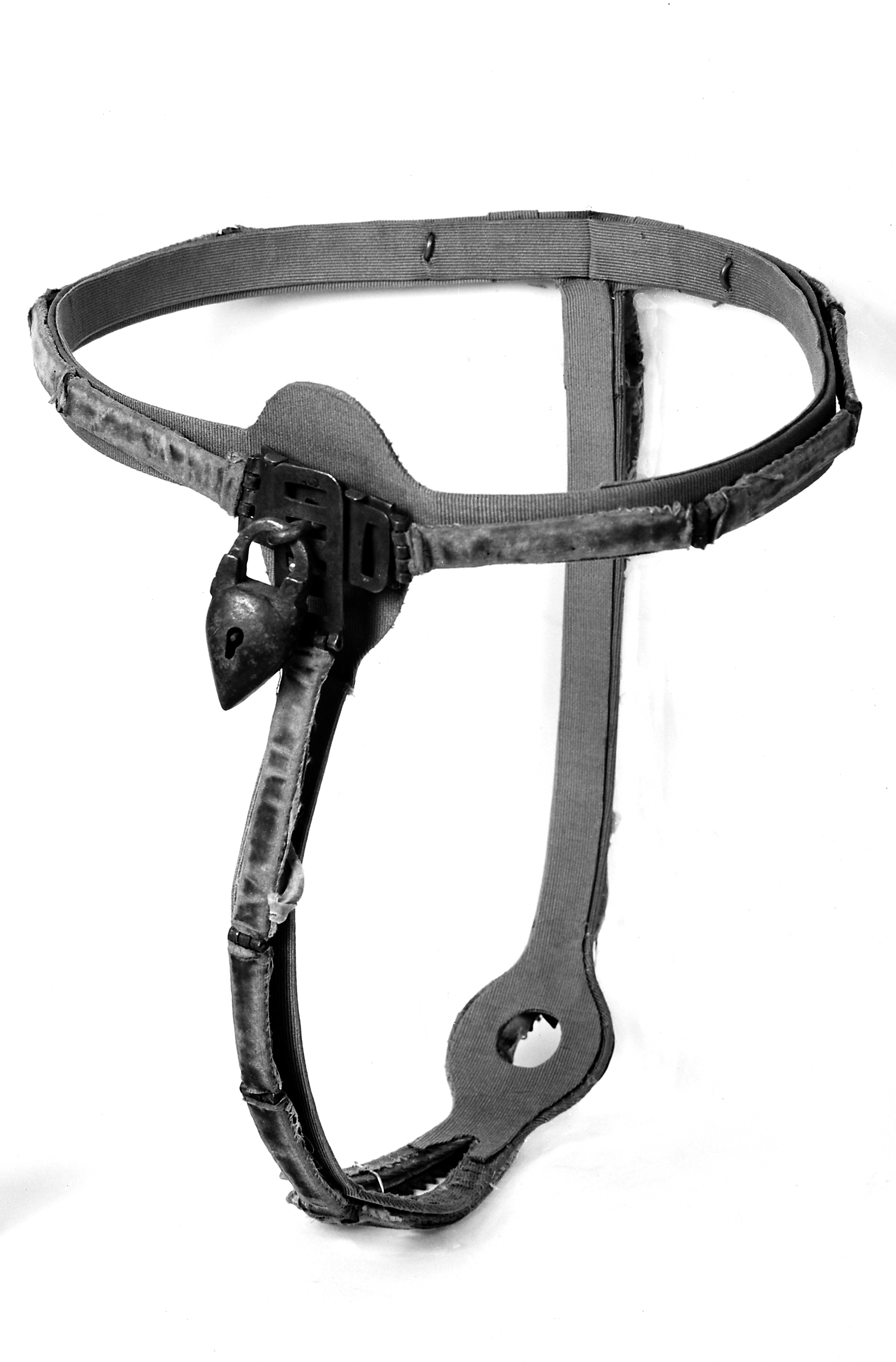
Antique chastity belt, complete with waistbelt and padlock. From the Wellcome Collection

Chastity belts are a type of chastity device used in BDSM as part of the practice of orgasm denial, to prevent the wearer from engaging in certain types of sexual activity without the permission of the dominant, who acts as the "keyholder", possessing the key that unlocks the chastity belt. Without access to the key, the wearer usually cannot take off the chastity belt or device.

Chastity belts and devices prevent sexual intercourse, masturbation and oral sex involving the wearer's genitals. There are designs suitable for both men and women. Chastity belts may be worn during a session of BDSM play, for a limited period or as a long-term arrangement. Users who choose to wear a chastity device often have a chastity fetish, and therefore enjoy the experience of being in chastity.

Within the BDSM community, the month of October, also known as "Locktober", is an annual challenge in which people with a chastity fetish try to stay in chastity for the entire month.

== Purpose ==
The wearer of the belt is usually regarded as the submissive in a BDSM relationship. This is a part of the wider practice of orgasm denial. It has often been reported that when worn, the chastity belt frequently evokes sexual frustration in the wearer, which the wearer may find erotic and exciting.

== Male chastity belts ==
Modern chastity belts for men generally follow the traditional "Florentine" pattern (named after the historical reference to chastity belts in Florence in the 15th century military manual Bellifortis), with a band around the waist or hips and a "shield" that runs between the legs to cover the genitals.

== Female chastity belts ==
Chastity belts of the so-called Florentine type also exist for women. As in the standard Florentine design, a circular horizontal band encircles the waist and a shield is attached to the front of the waist belt. The shield extends downwards to cover the genital areas of the wearer and is attached to the back of the waist belt.

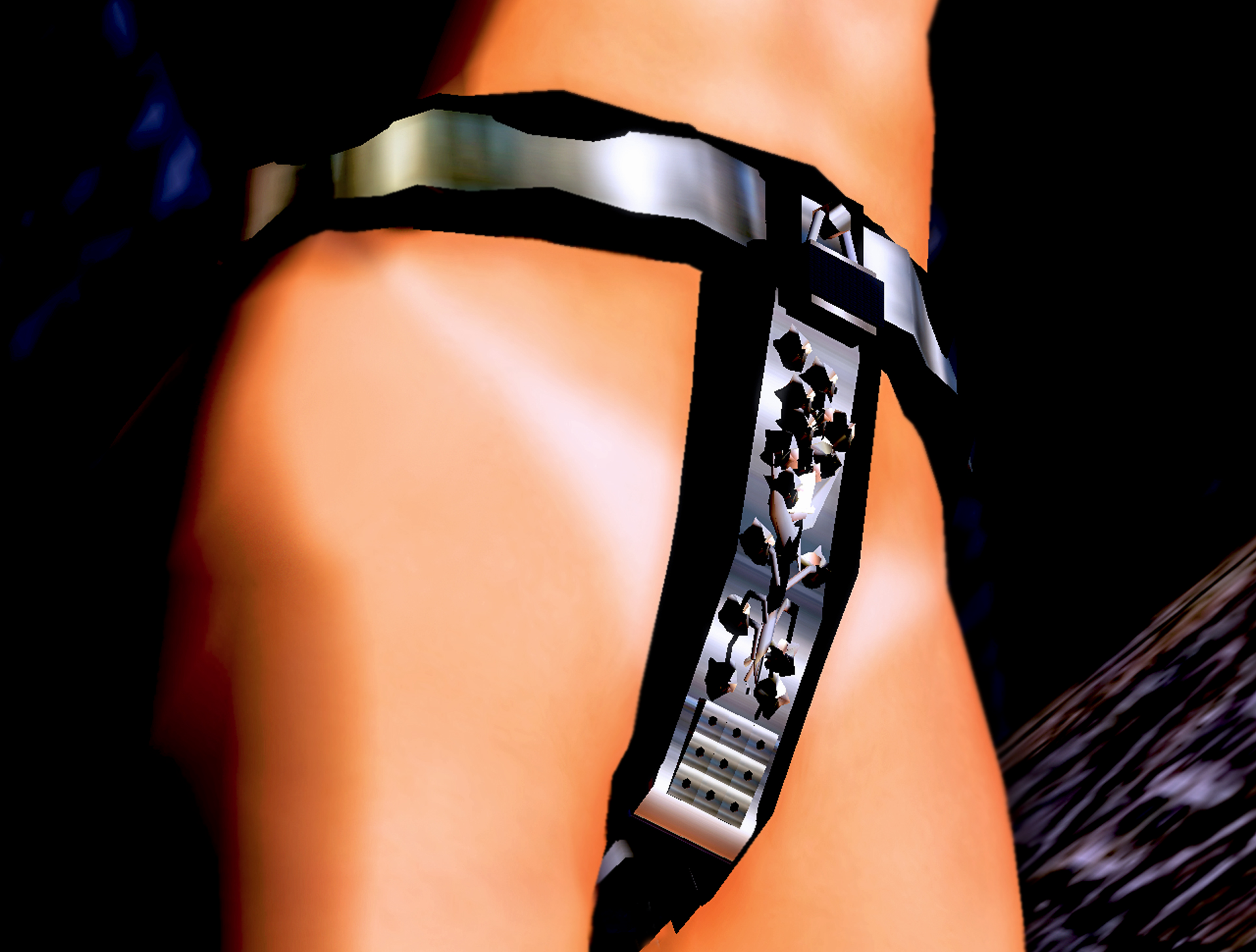
A female Carrara chastity belt

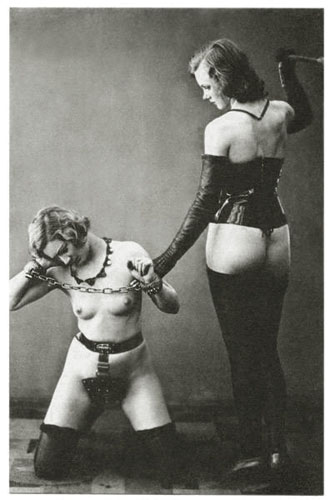

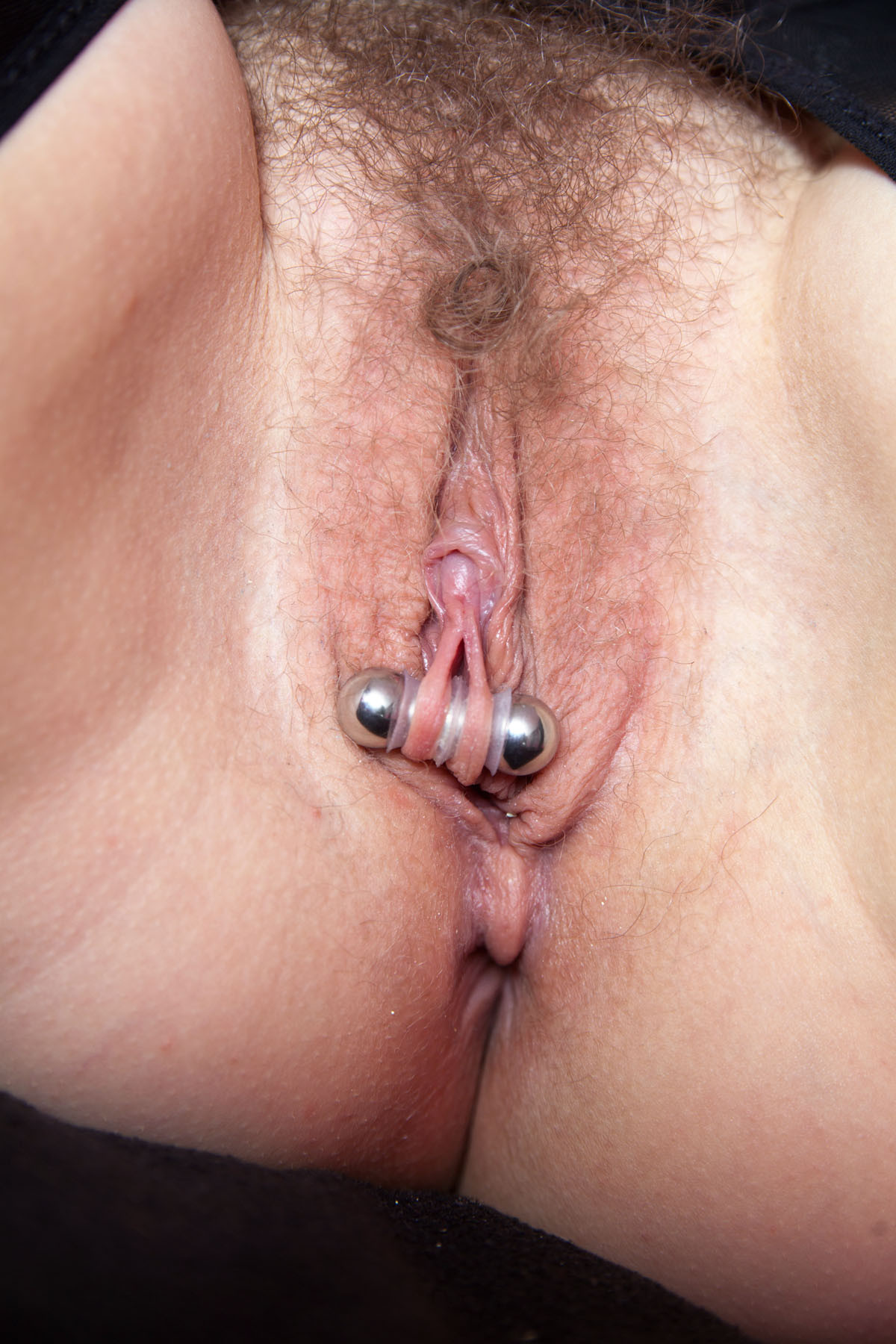
Pierced inner labia with chastity piercing

== Male chastity cages ==
A popular type of chastity device for males is commonly referred to as a chastity cage, penis cage, or chastity tube. They are almost exclusively used as a sex toy and in BDSM play, and may enclose the penis in order to make an erection uncomfortable or impossible if the wearer becomes sexually aroused, and prevent sexual intercourse, masturbation, oral sex involving the wearer's genitals and some other forms of sexual activity.

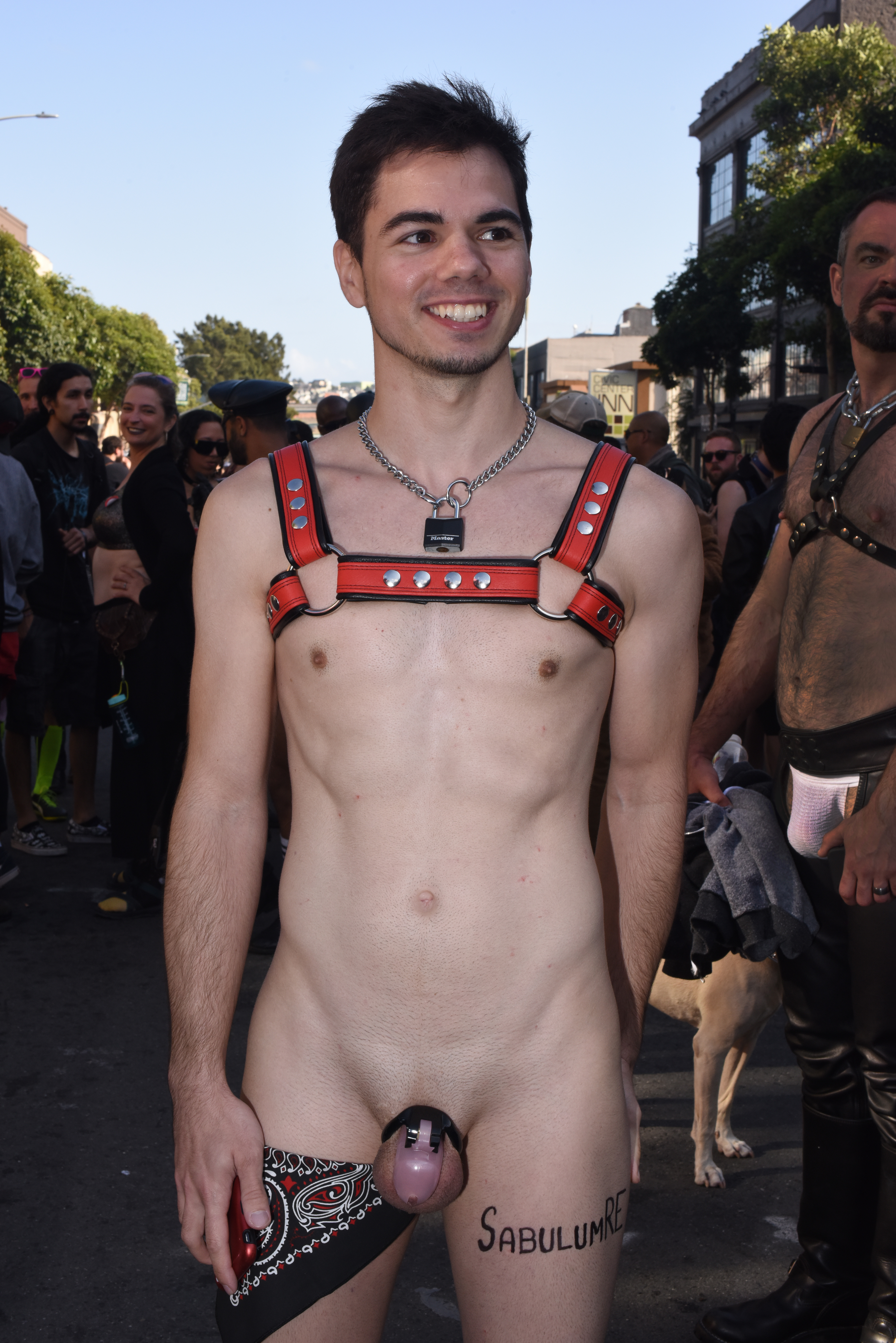
A plastic chastity cage worn at Folsom Street Fair

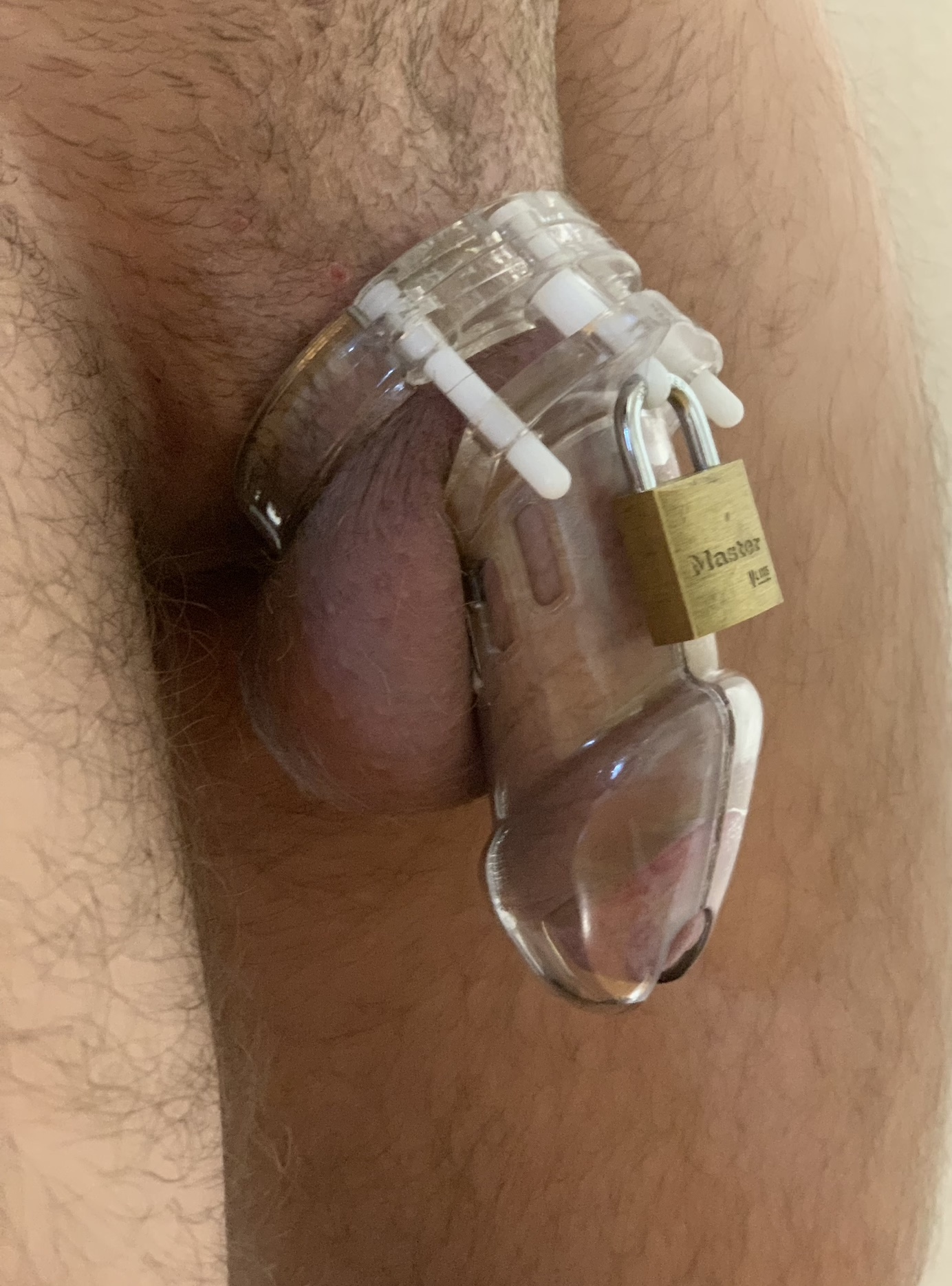
A commonly used type of chastity cage made of plastic

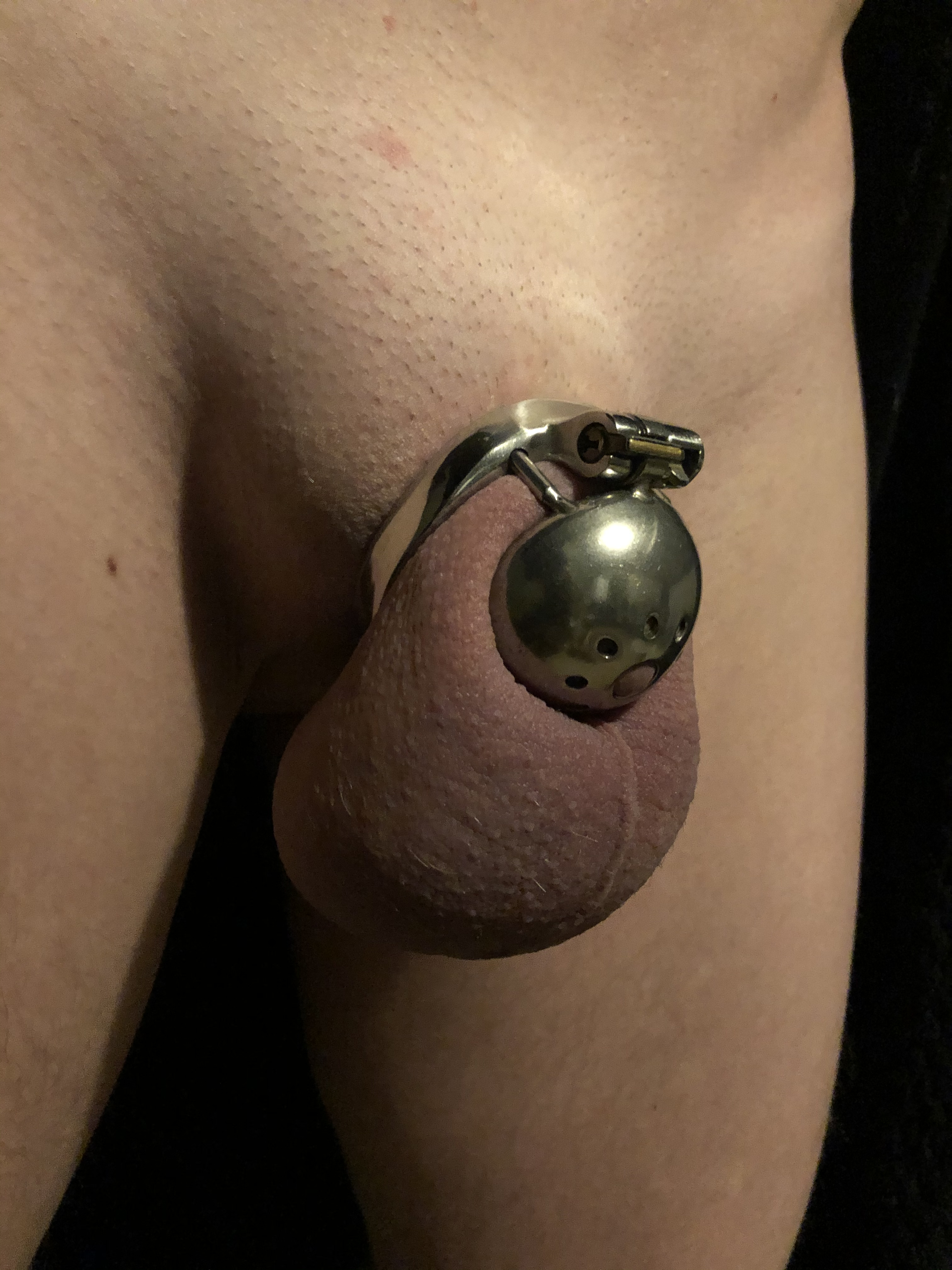
Extreme micro chastity

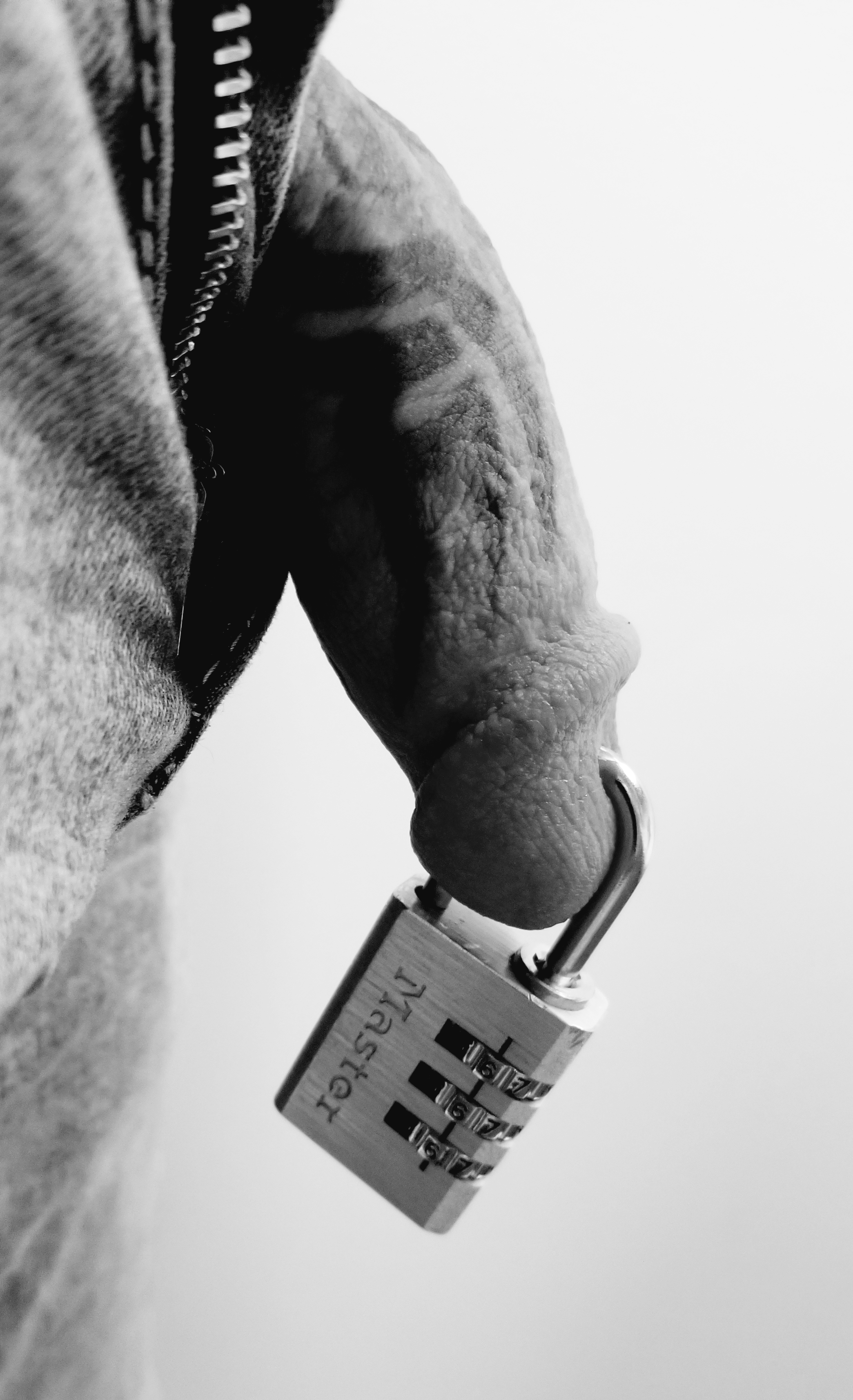
A lock inserted through the chastity piercing in the penis

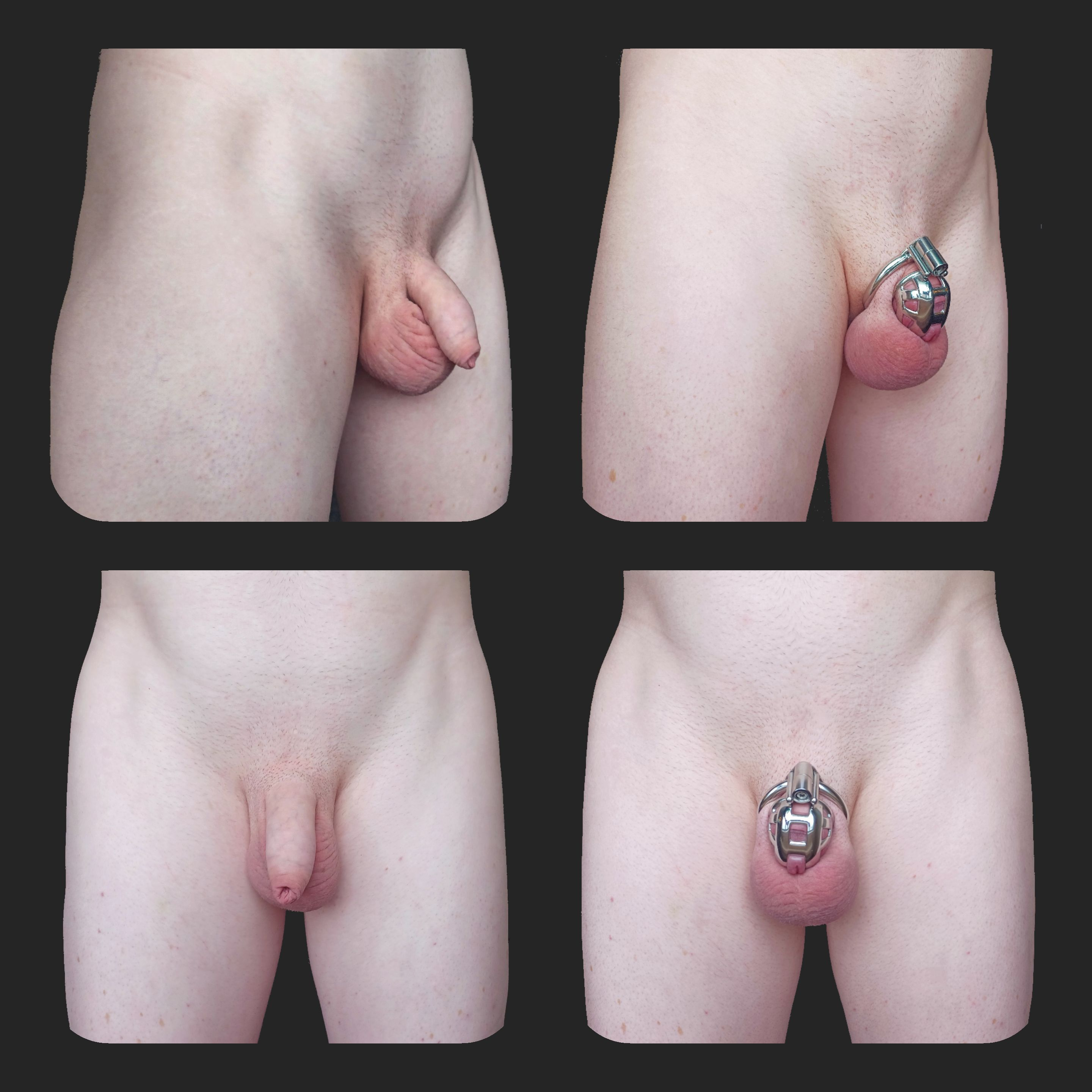
A side by side comparison of an uncaged uncircumcised penis and a caged penis. In a stainless steel nub-style cage with a screw-style lock.

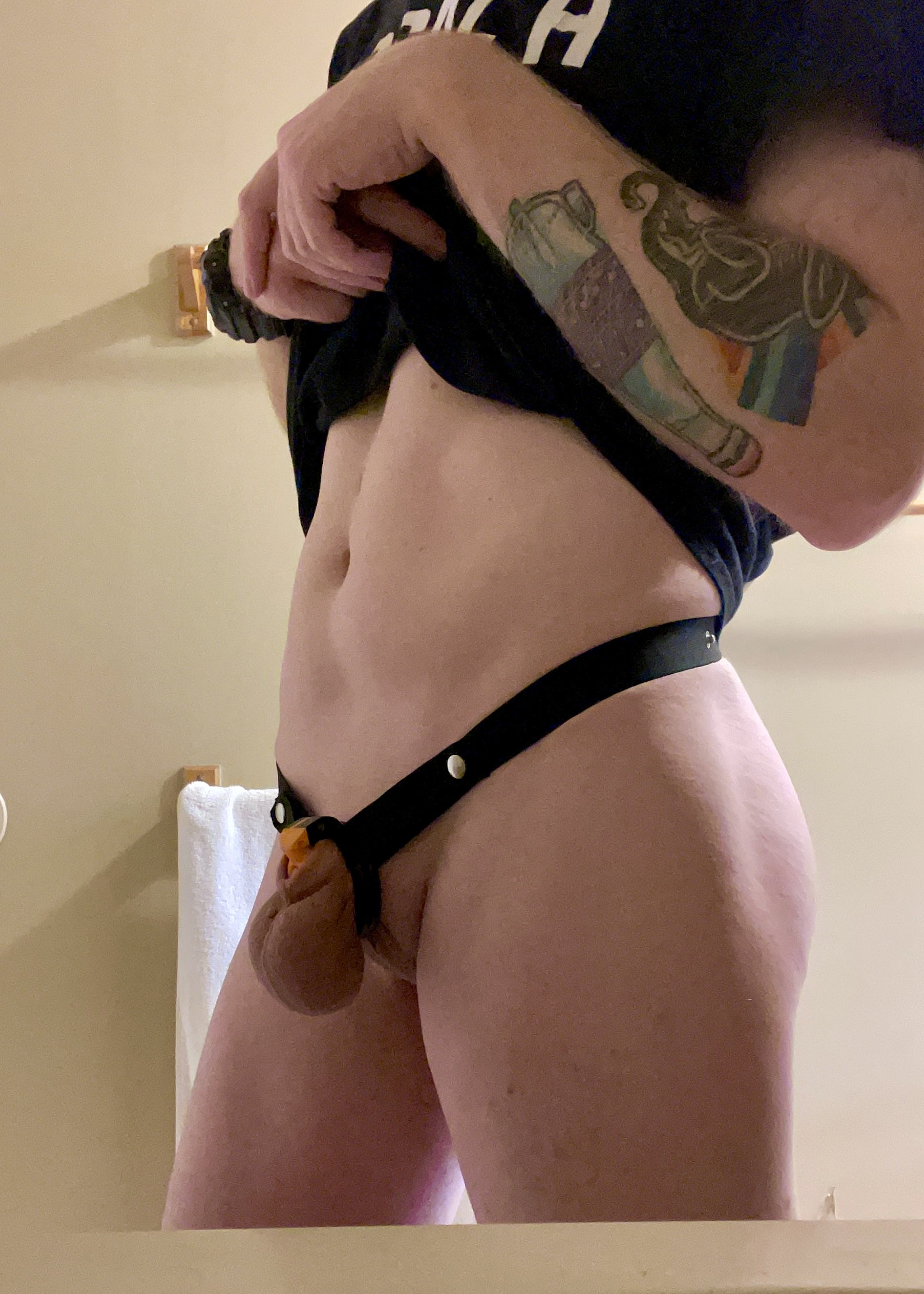
A 3D-printed micro chastity cage

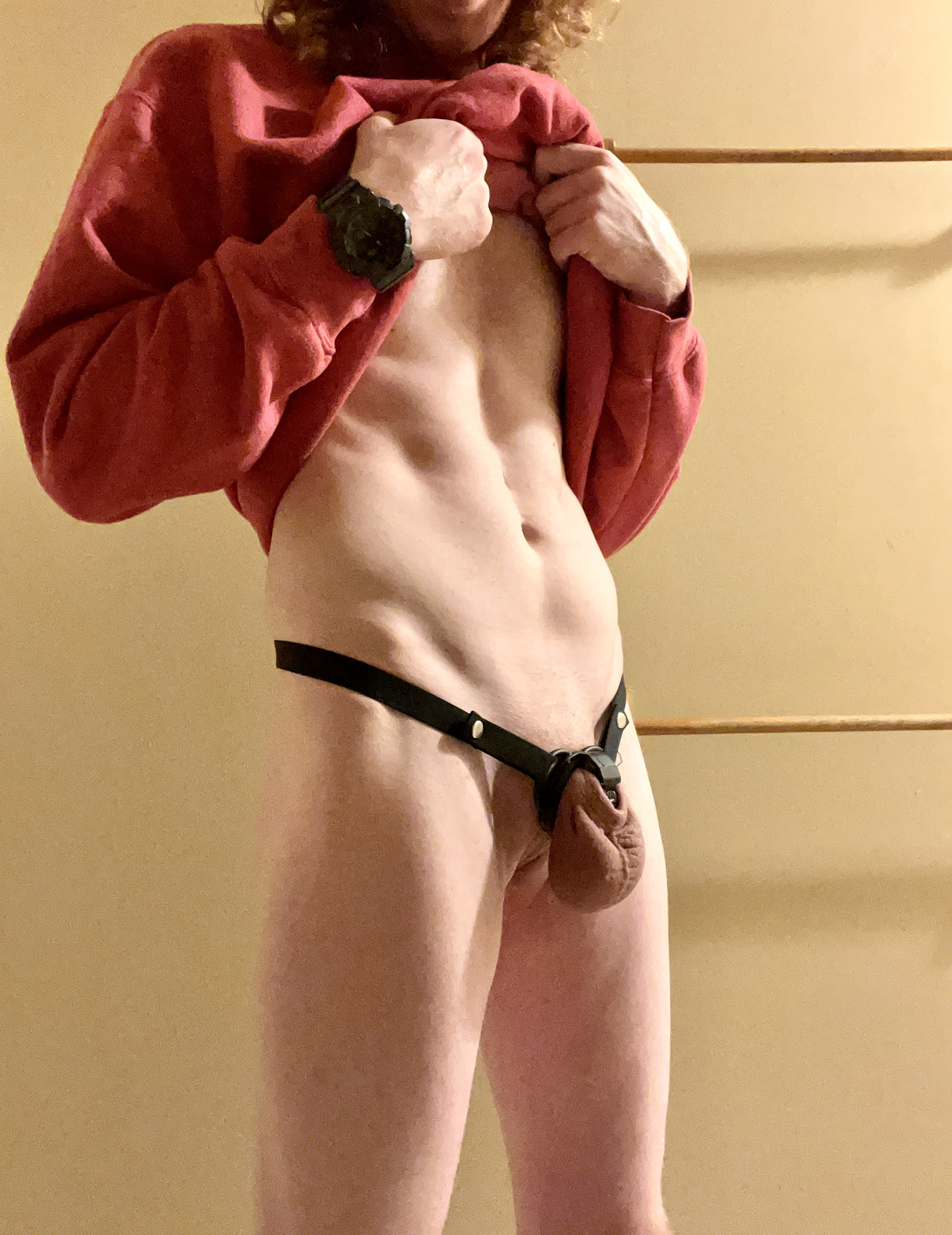
A male wearing a 3D printed chastity cage designed for long term wear.

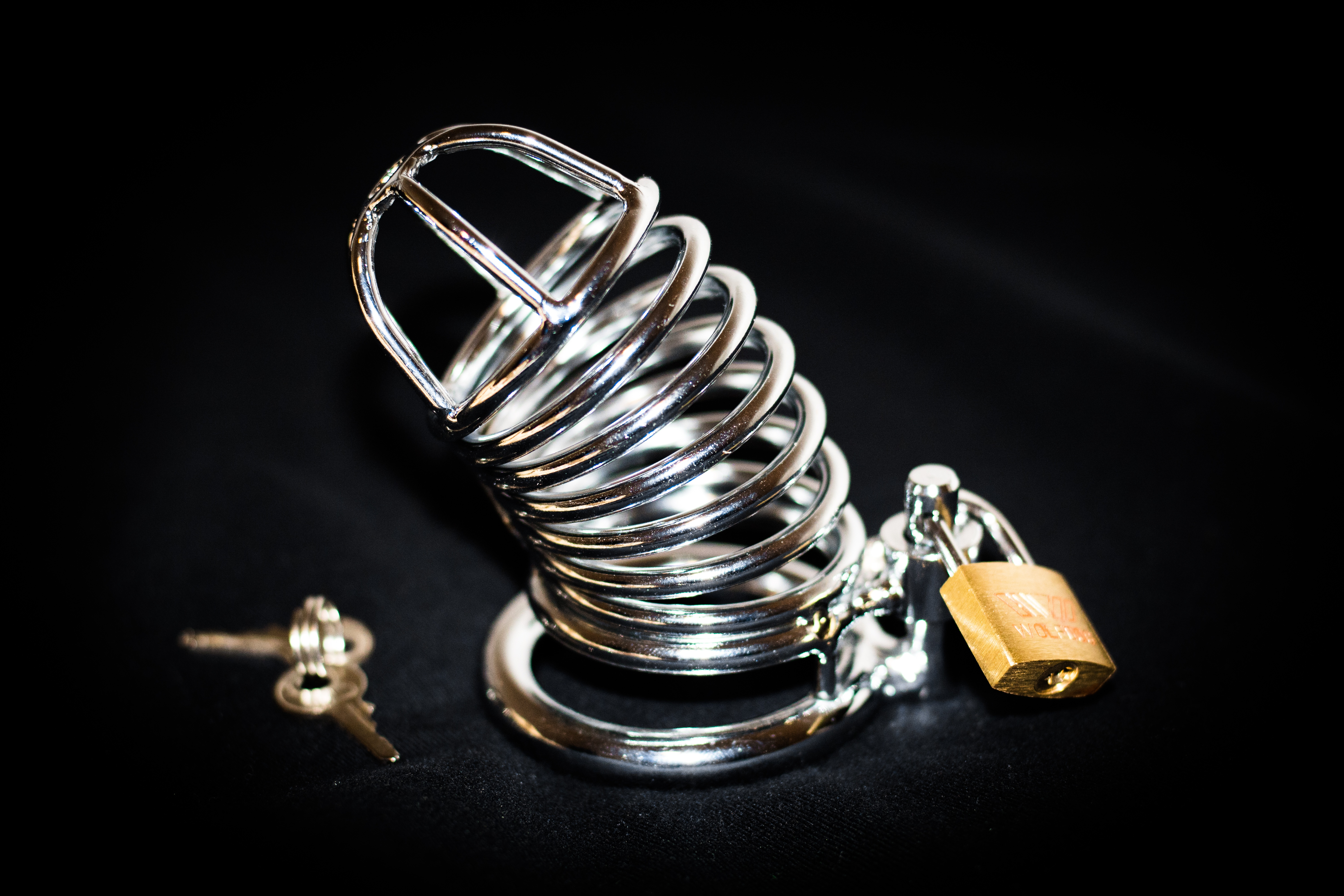

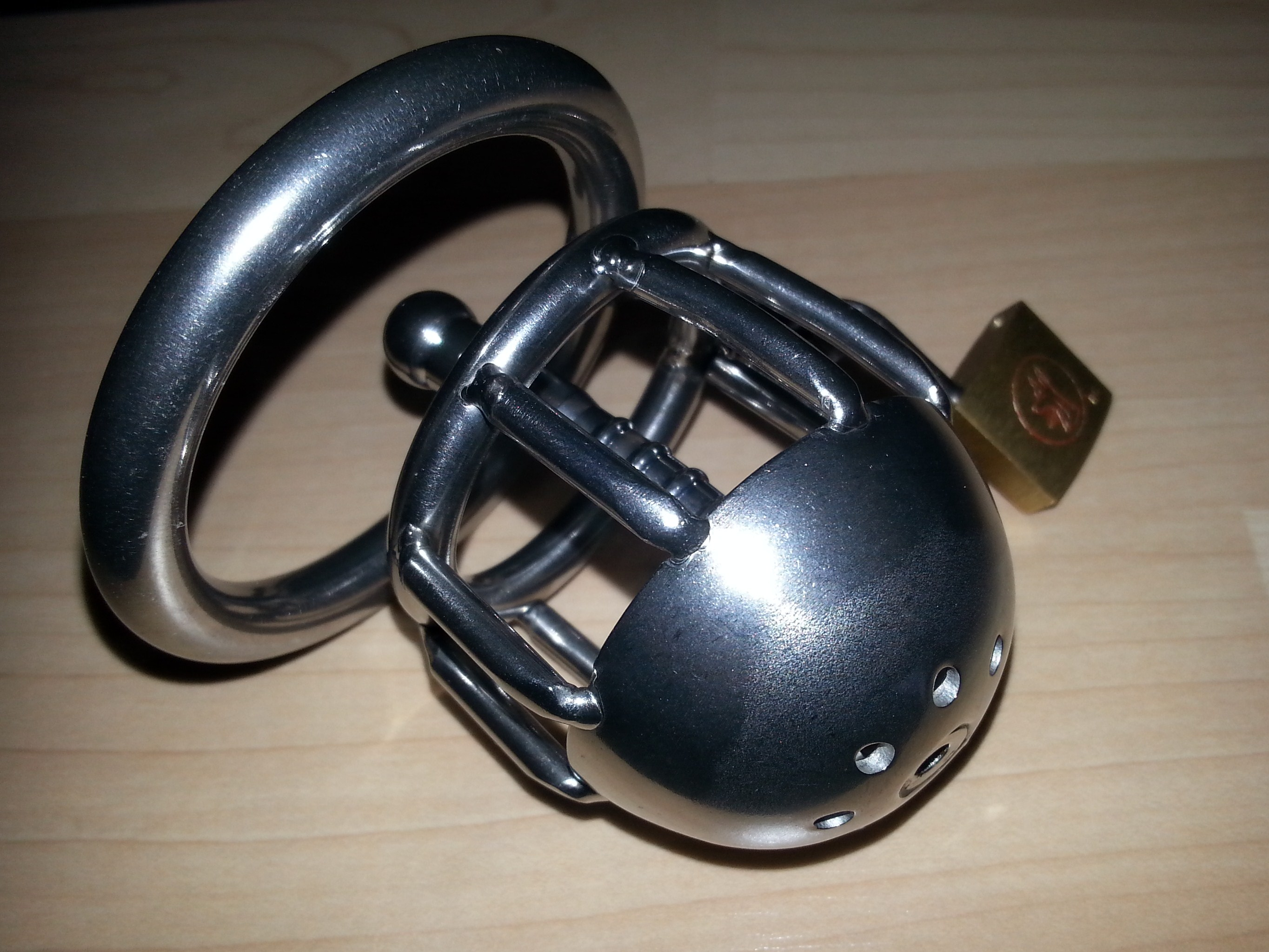

=== Safety ===
Penile strangulation, as a result of not being able to remove any kind of device placed around the penis, has occurred in a wide spectrum of age groups, so care must be taken to avoid constriction with a chastity belt. In 2008, an incident was reported of a man having to be cut free from a titanium chastity device after losing the keys, due to pressure on the genitals.

== Manufacture ==
Most modern chastity belt designs are descended from Hal Higginbottom's designs from 1956. Sometimes modern Florentine-style belts are described as "Tollyboy-style" or "Tollyboy-type" belts as references to his company's original design.

Human anatomy varies very widely from person to person and steel belts intended for long-term use are bespoke (custom-made) items.

In 1969, Time magazine and various newspapers in 1978 ran stories about David Renwick, a British chastity belt maker who claimed to have a thriving business making belts for a worldwide clientele.

In 1971, the Hugessen firm of Halstead, Essex, that made chastity belts, won tax exempt status on the basis that their products were birth control devices. In 1974, a story was widely published in magazines and newspapers about the firm's bankruptcy.

Doris and Frank Miller designed the plastic CB-2000 in the late nineties, and formed A.L. Enterprises, of Las Vegas, US, that sells the CB series of plastic chastity cages.

Although no reliable statistics are available on the use of chastity belts, anecdotal reports from manufacturers suggest that most belts sold in Europe and the U.S. are for women, and that of the male belts ordered, relatively few are used as rape prevention devices.

== Erotica ==
Chastity belts have made appearances in erotica. Esar Levine's 1931 Chastity Belts: An Illustrated History of the Bridling of Women compiled erotica of men in chastity belts, with commentary.

== See also ==
- Chastity piercing
- Cock and ball torture
- Cuckquean fetishism
- Cuckold fetishism
- Erotic sexual denial
- Gender affirmation
- Locktober
