= Outline of BDSM =

Erotic practices involving domination and sadomasochism

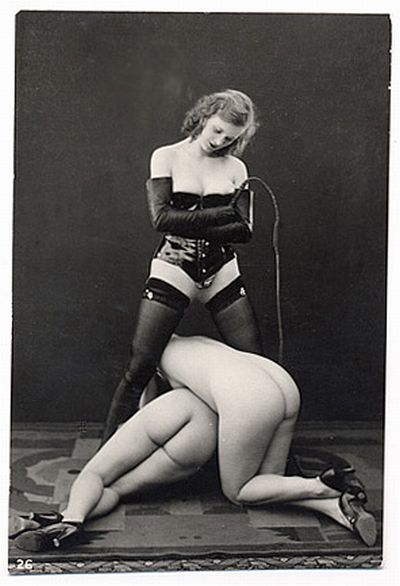
A dominatrix with two naked female submissives - image taken at Studio Biederer, Paris, 1930.

The following outline is provided as an overview of and topical guide to BDSM:

BDSM is a variety of often erotic practices or roleplaying involving bondage, discipline, dominance and submission, sadomasochism, and other related interpersonal dynamics. Given the wide range of practices, some of which may be engaged in by people who do not consider themselves to be practising BDSM, inclusion in the BDSM community or subculture often is said to depend on self-identification and shared experience.

== Etymology ==
The term BDSM is an initialism intended to encompass all of the following activities:

- Bondage and discipline (B & D or B/D)
- Dominance and submission (D & S or D/s) (including "master and slave" role-playing scenarios and ongoing relationship structures)
- Sadomasochism (S & M or S/M)

== Bondage ==
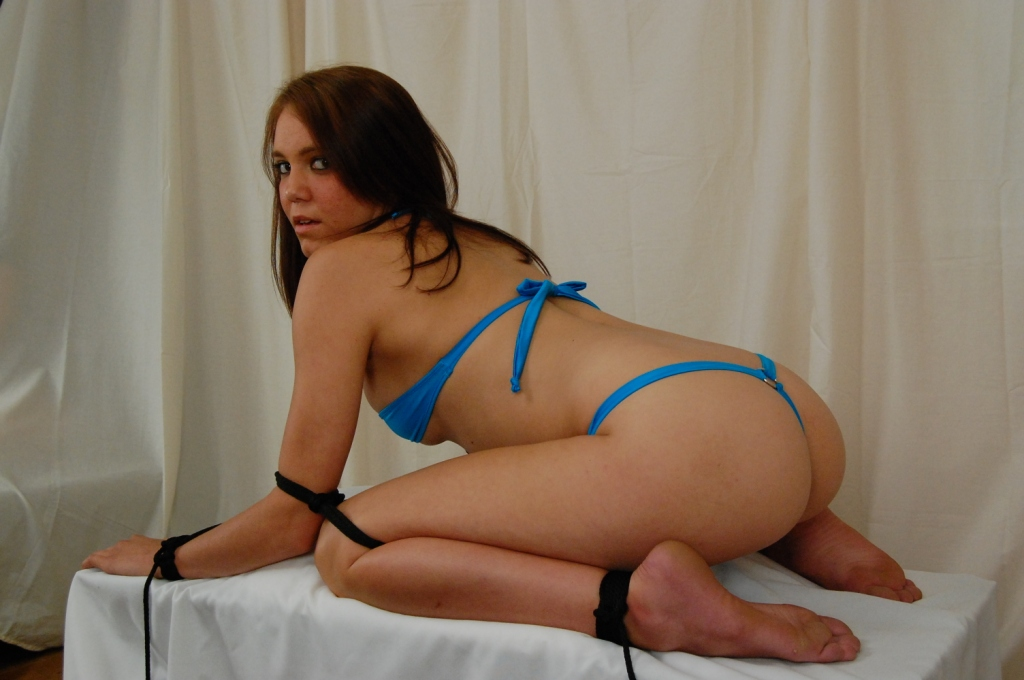
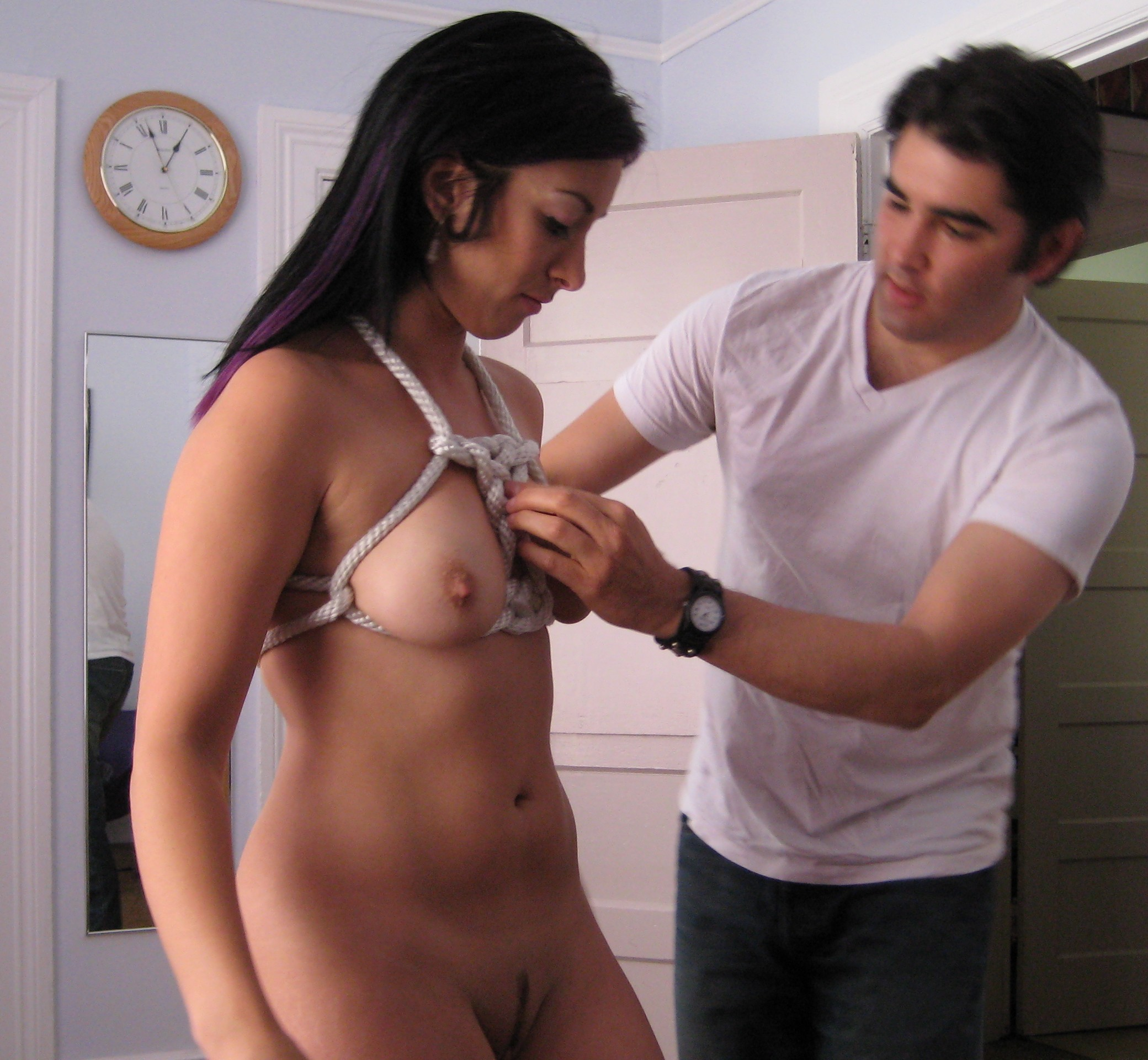
Different types of rope bondage

By material

- Japanese bondage
- Metal bondage
  - Handcuffs
- Rope bondage

By body part

- Self-bondage
- Head bondage
- Neck
  - Collar (BDSM)
  - Stocks
- Arms
  - Wrists – Bondage cuffs
  - Arms – Armbinder
  - Stocks
- Breast bondage
- Crotch rope

== Dominance and Submission ==
- Ageplay
- Fear play
- Body worship
- Boot worship
- Erotic humiliation
- Erotic hypnosis
- Erotic sexual denial
- Facesitting
- Female dominance
- Female submission
- Male dominance
- Male submission
- Bladder desperation
- Feminization
- Master/slave
- Medical fetishism
- Rape play
- Service-oriented submission
- Consensual non-consent (blanket consent)

== Sadomasochism ==
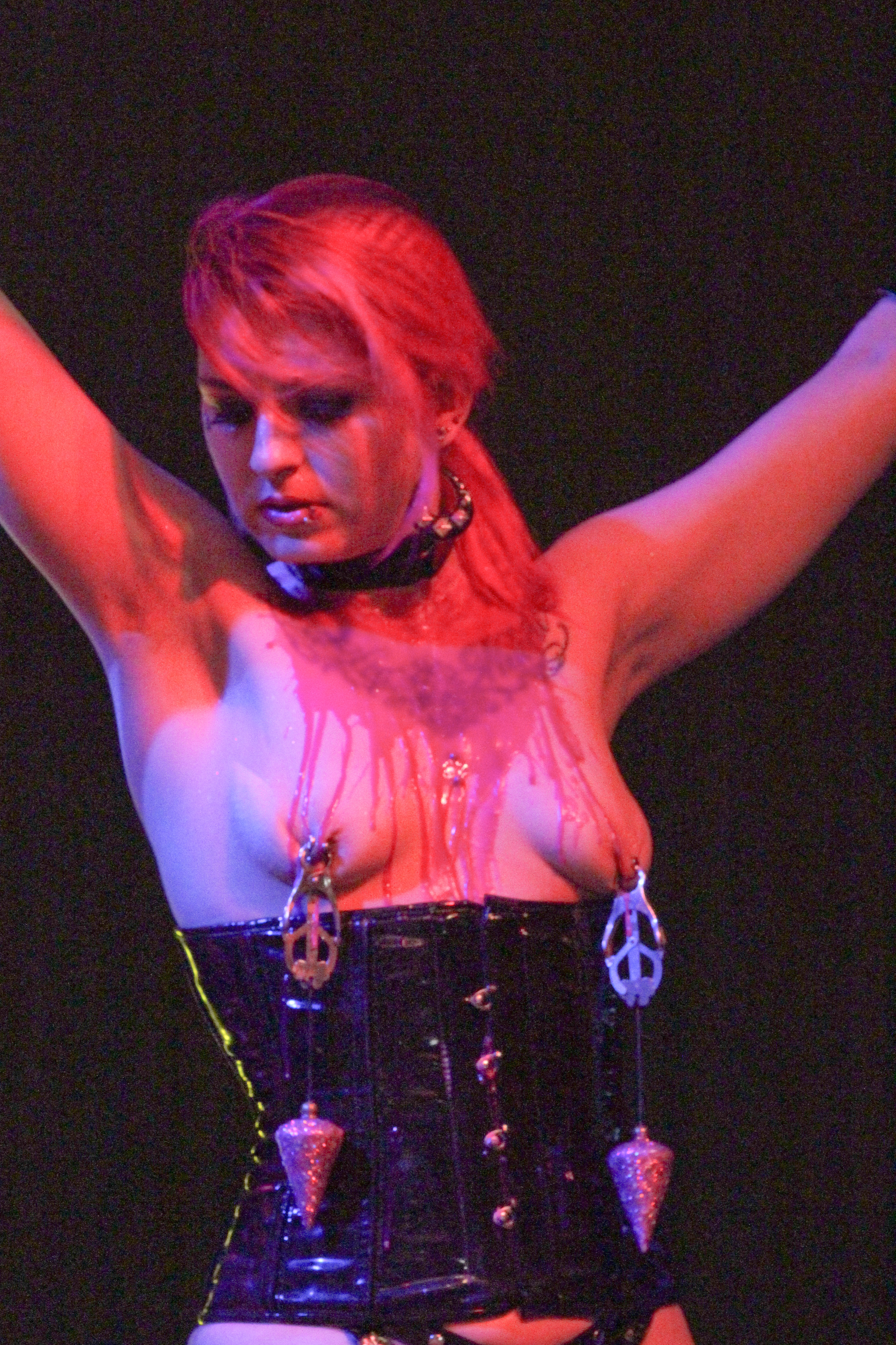
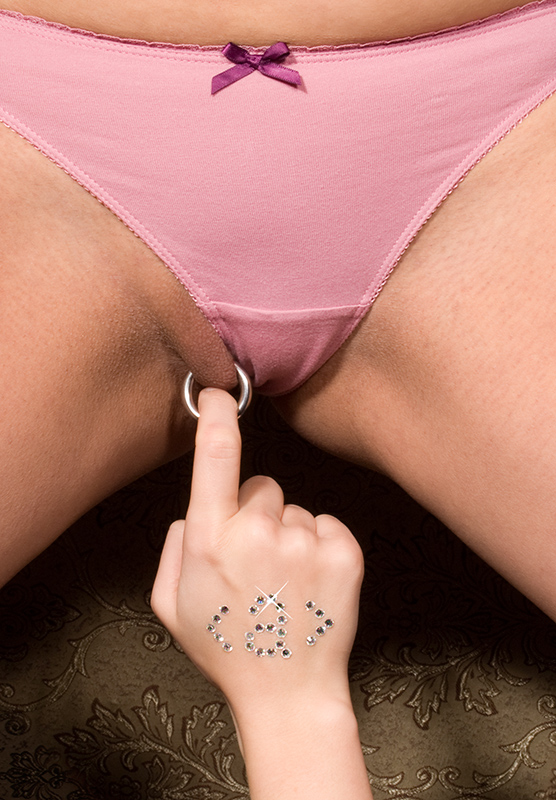
Weights hung from nipples using nipple clamps, along with waxplay, at Wave-Gotik-Treffen, Germany (left) and Pussy torture by pulling a labia piercing ring (right).
- Enema play
- Erotic spanking
- Speculum play
- Breast torture
  - Nipple clamp
  - Nipple piercing
- Cock and ball torture
- Pussy torture
- Tickle torture

== Types of play ==
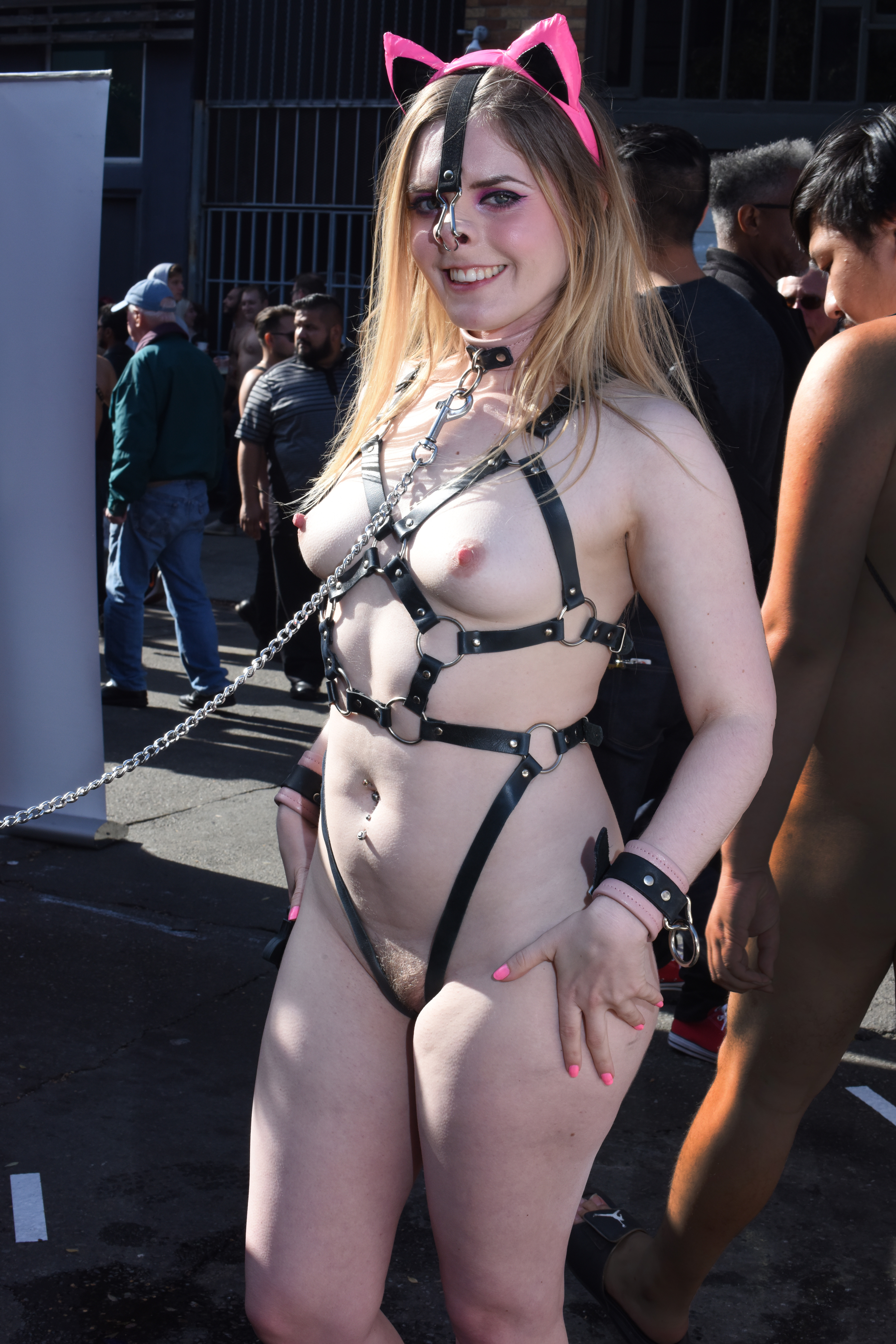
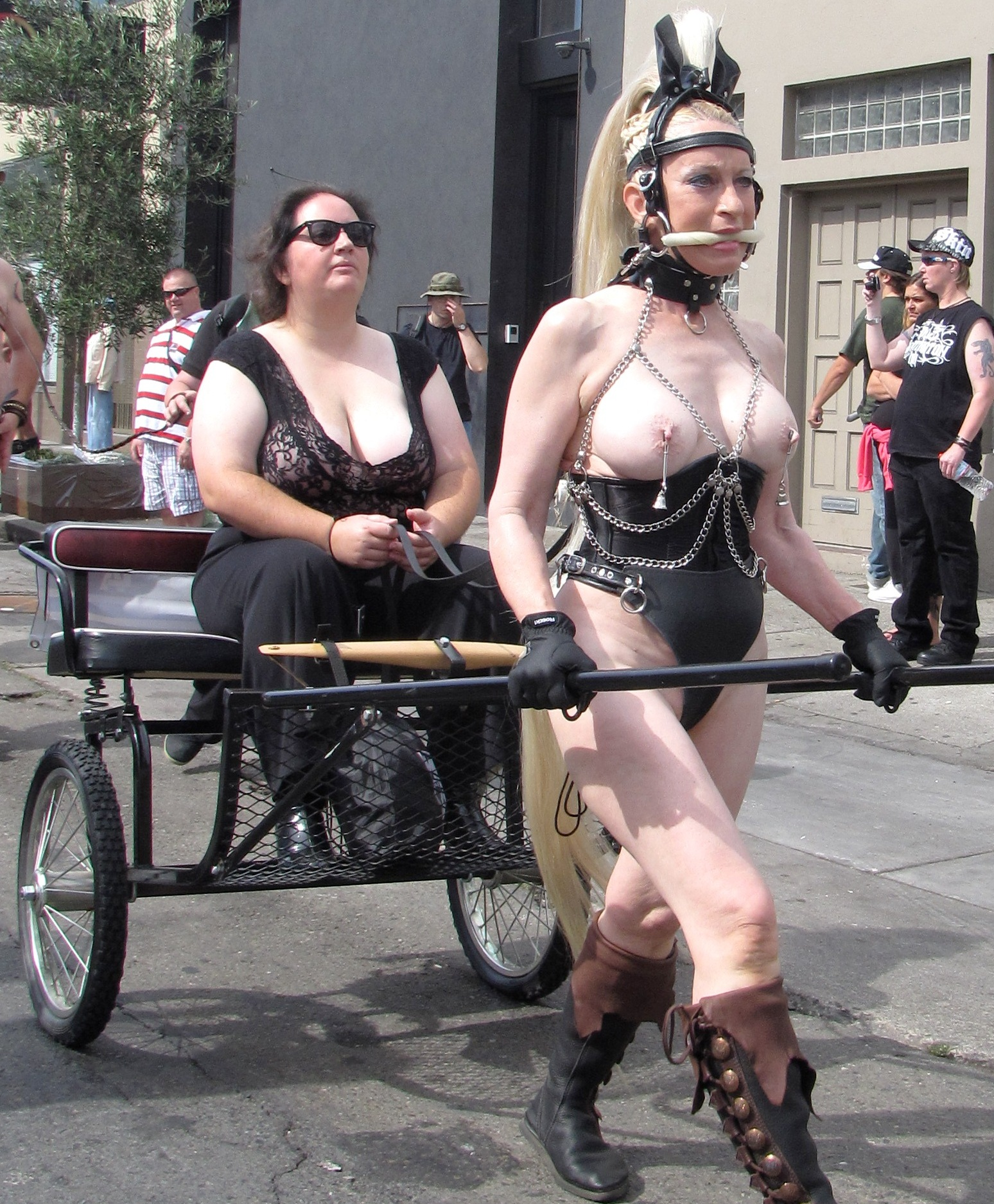
Animal roleplay at Folsom Street Fair: women dressed as kitten (left) and as pony (right).
- Edgeplay
  - Knife play
- Fear play
- Body Modification
  - Play piercing
  - Suspension
- Sexual roleplay
  - Age play
  - Animal roleplay
  - Gender Play
  - Rape play
- Sensation play
  - Temperature play
  - Breath play
  - Impact play
  - Pain play
  - Sensory deprivation

== BDSM equipment ==
- Gag (BDSM)
  - Ball gag
  - Bit gag
  - Funnel gag
  - Jennings gag
  - Muzzle gag
  - OTM gag
  - Pecker gag
  - Penis gag
  - Stuff gag
  - Tape gag
  - Whitehead gag
- Bondage harness
  - Cock harness
  - Dildo harness
  - Head harness

== Sexual fetishism and Paraphilia ==
Paraphilia
Sexual sadism disorder
Sexual fetishism

- Breast fetishism
- Diaper fetishism
- Foot fetishism
- Fur fetishism
- Leather fetishism
- Latex and PVC fetishism
- Spandex fetishism
- Stocking fetishism

== BDSM terminology ==
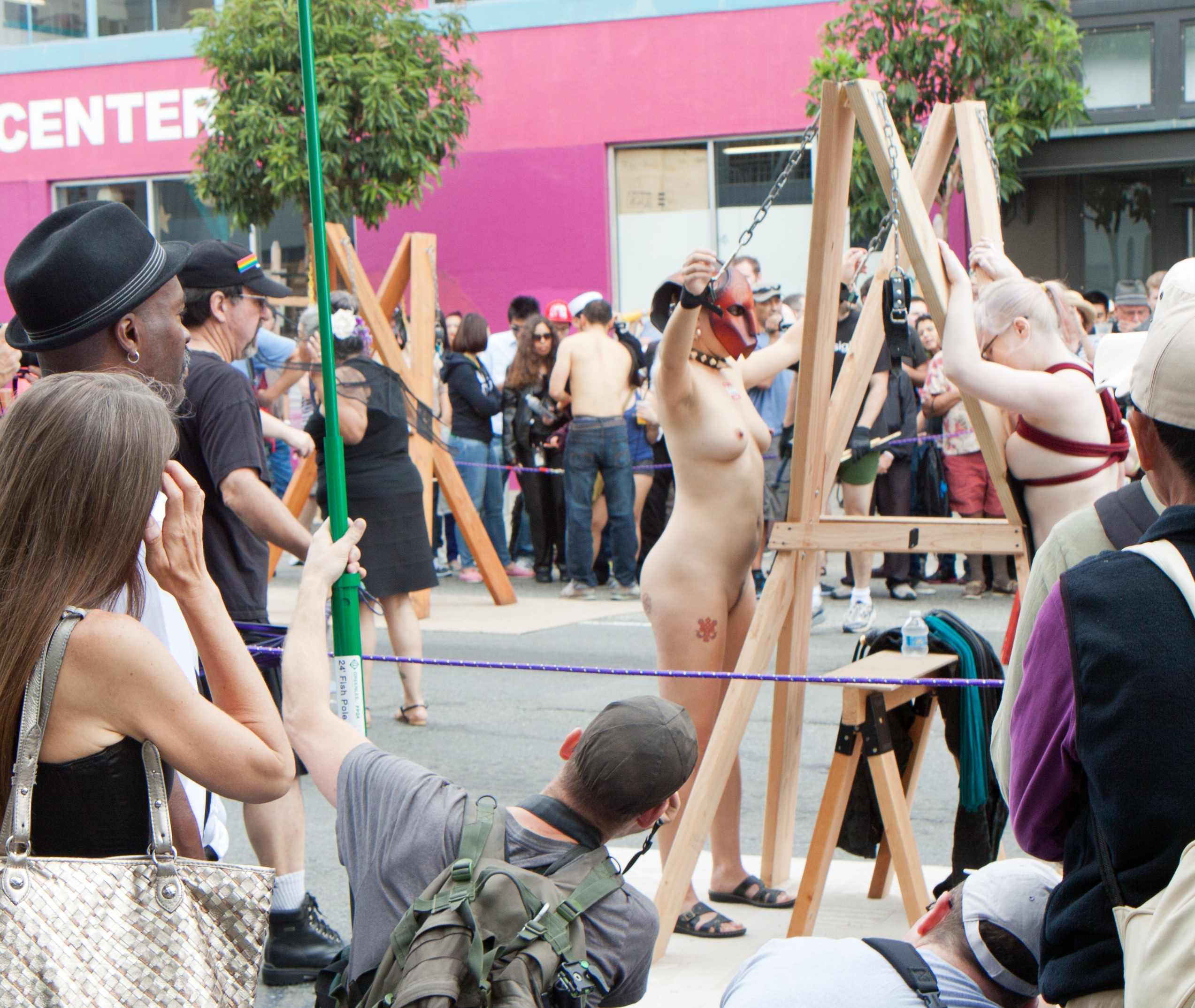
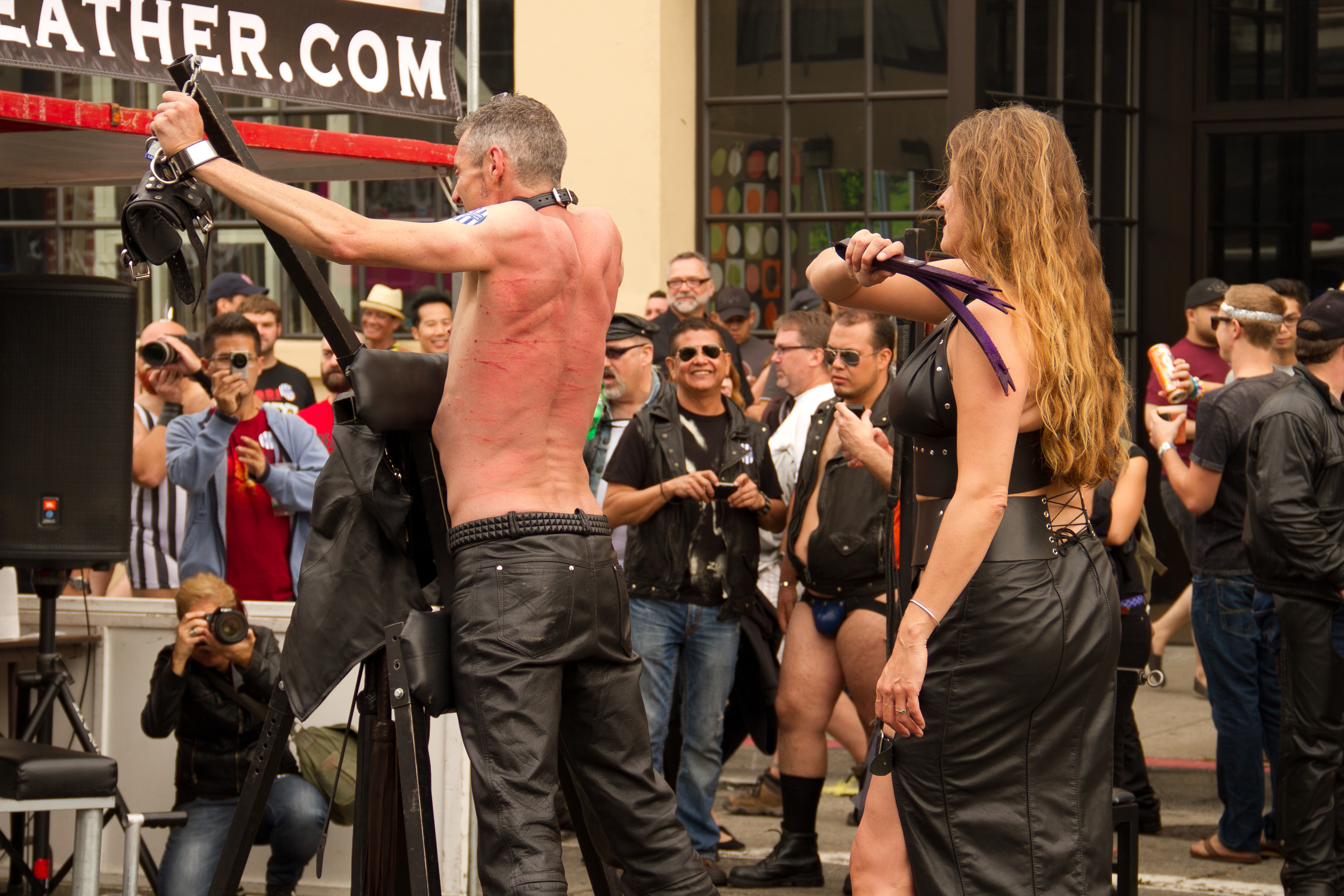
Sadomasochism in public: Woman (left) and man (right) chained to Saint Andrew's Cross get flogged at Folsom Street Fair.

Bondage
Discipline (BDSM)
Glossary of BDSM

- Roles
  - Bottom
  - Top
  - Dominant
  - Submissive
  - Master/slave
  - Maledom
  - Dominatrix
- Sexual slavery (BDSM)
- Sexual fetishism
- Hard limit (BDSM)
- Limits (BDSM)
- Negotiation (BDSM)
- Contract (BDSM)
- Play (BDSM)
- Scene (BDSM)
- Session (BDSM)

== Significant BDSM people ==
- Peter Acworth
- Jeff Gord
- Laura Antoniou
- Maria Beatty
- Barbara Behr
- Theresa Berkley
- Gloria Brame
- Böse Buben
- Richard Francis Burton
- Patrick Califia
- Vanessa Duriès
- Dossie Easton
- Bob Flanagan
- Maîtresse Françoise
- Matthias T. J. Grimme
- Janet Hardy
- Alfred Kinsey
- Irving Klaw
- Richard Freiherr von Krafft-Ebing
- John Norman
- Bettie Page
- Pauline Réage
- Catherine Robbe-Grillet
- Gayle Rubin
- Leopold von Sacher-Masoch
- Marquis de Sade
- Dita von Teese
- Jay Wiseman

== Media ==
- A Defence of Masochism
- Belle de jour (novel)
- Belle de jour (film)
- Billions (TV series)
- The Bitter Tears of Petra von Kant
- Bonding (TV series)
- The Claiming of Sleeping Beauty
- De Usu Flagrorum
- Diagnostic and Statistical Manual of Mental Disorders
- The Ethical Slut
- Fetishes (film)
- Fifty Shades of Grey
- The Image (film)
- The Image (novel)
- Imaginative Sex
- Mano Destra
- Maîtresse
- Moonlight Whispers
- The Piano Teacher (Jelinek novel)
- Preaching to the Perverted (film)
- Psychopathia Sexualis
- Romance (1999 film)
- Secretary (2002 film)
- Seduction: The Cruel Woman
- Shrimp (film)
- Skin Two
- Spanking Love
- Story of O
- Submission (TV series)
- Tokyo Decadence
- Venus in Furs
- A Woman in Flames

== Lists ==
- Glossary of BDSM
- BDSM artists
- BDSM authors
- BDSM equipment
- BDSM in culture and media
- BDSM organizations
- BDSM photographers
- List of bondage positions
- List of universities with BDSM clubs
- Category:BDSM

== See also ==
- Outline of human sexuality
- Sex position
