= List of BDSM organizations =

This is a list of educational, campaigning and community organizations related to BDSM.

Where an organization clearly indicates on its website that membership is restricted by gender or sexual orientation, this is noted. Many BDSM organizations of the social/community variety will require prospective members to attend an orientation meeting, where among other things, the organizers will attempt to screen out the obviously unsafe people and those whose interest in BDSM is professional (for example as journalists or law enforcement personnel) rather than personal.

== Europe ==
=== Czech Republic ===
- Other World Kingdom

=== Norway ===
- SMil Norge – national BDSM and fetish advocacy organization founded in 1988.

=== Denmark ===
- SMil

=== Germany ===
- Böse Buben
- Bundesvereinigung Sadomasochismus
- SMJG

=== Netherlands ===
- SamariuM
- VSSM

=== United Kingdom ===
- Spanner Trust

== North America ==
=== United States ===
- Black Rose, Washington D.C.
- Center for Sex Positive Culture (aka The Wet Spot), Seattle
- Conversio Virium (CV), Columbia University, New York City
- The Eulenspiegel Society, New York City
- Folsom Street Events, San Francisco, California
- Lesbian Sex Mafia, lesbians and bisexual women only, New York City
- National Coalition for Sexual Freedom
- National Leather Association International
- Samois, lesbians only, San Francisco, California (historical)
- Society of Janus, San Francisco, California

== See also ==
- Glossary of BDSM
- List of BDSM topics
- List of universities with BDSM clubs
