= Breast torture =

BDSM sexual activity

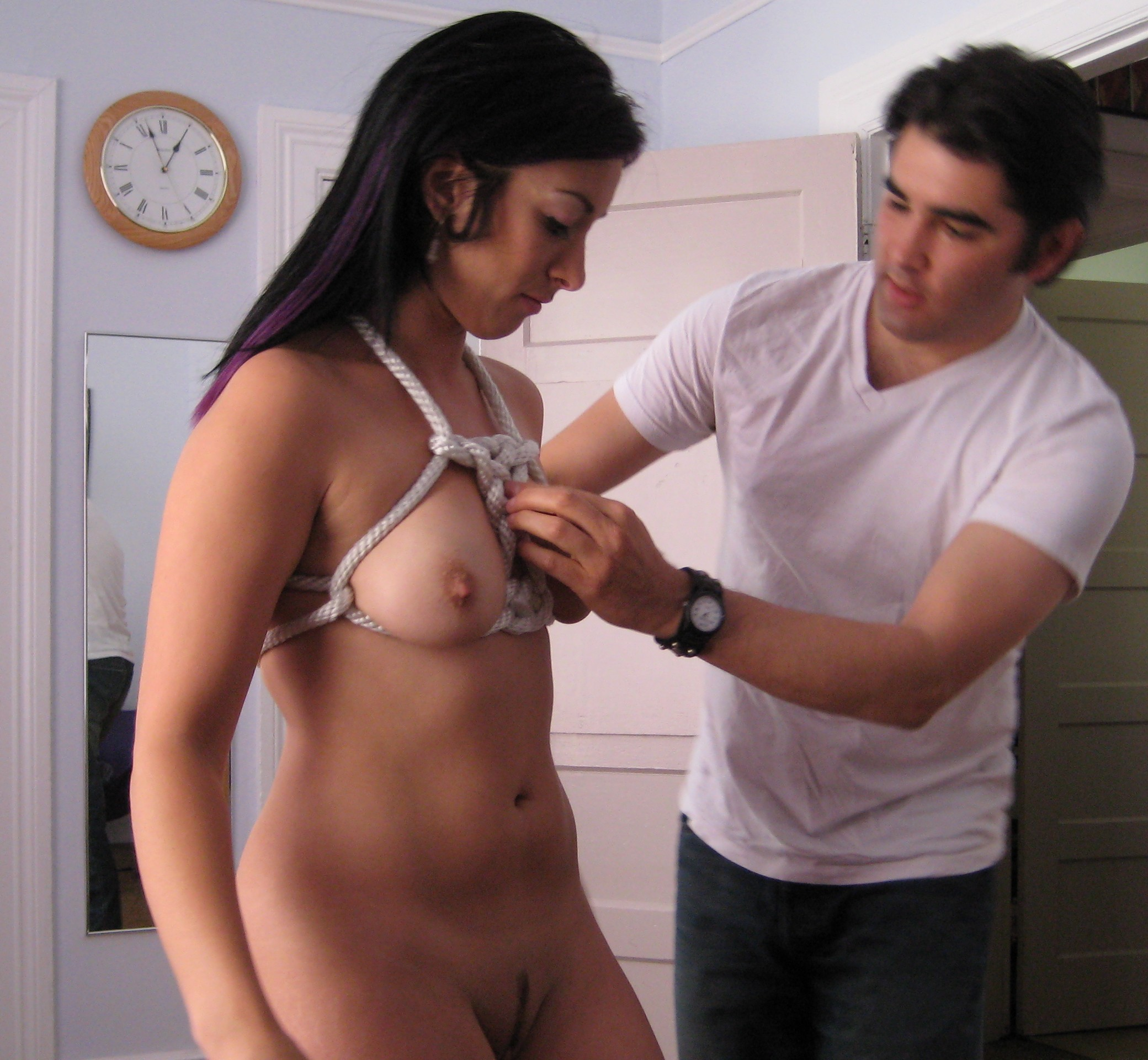
A bondage rigger creating a shinju rope breast harness that can be used for breast bondage

Breast torture (also called breast play or tit torture) is a BDSM activity in which sexual stimulation is provided through the intentional application of physical pain or constriction to the breasts, areolae or nipples of a submissive. It is a popular activity among the kink community. The recipient of such activities may wish to receive them as a result of masochism.

Some forms of breast torture, such as the use of clothespins on nipples, light flagellation and simple breast bondage, are considered to be relatively safe and benign. In contrast, some forms of breast torture, such as severe caning, amateur piercing, or being suspended by the breasts, are considered edge activities that can include great risk.

== Techniques ==
There are a variety of techniques used for breast torture, and they are sometimes combined to produce a greater erotic effect.

=== Nipple torture ===
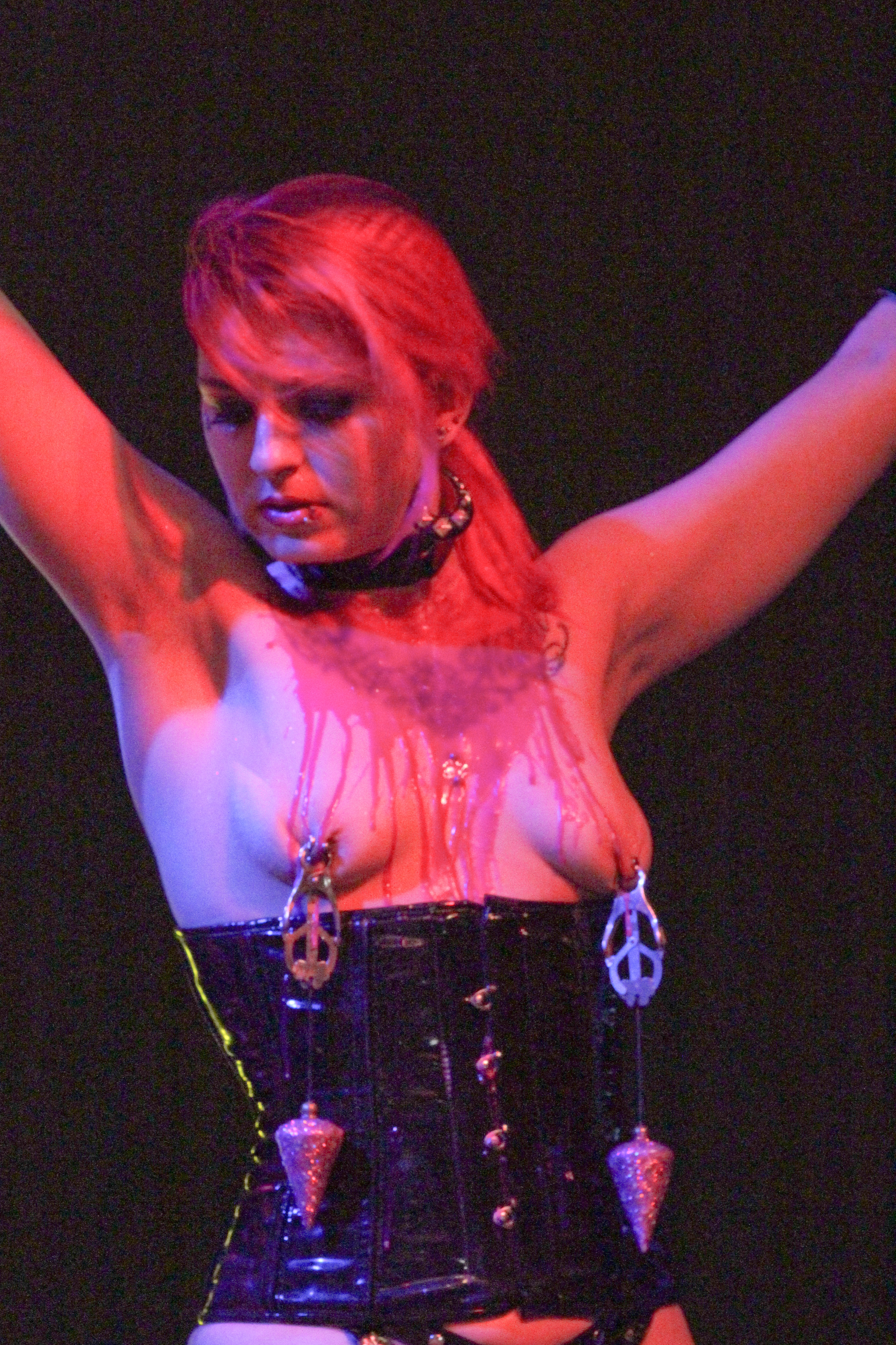
Weights hung from nipples using nipple clamps, along with waxplay, at Wave-Gotik-Treffen, Germany

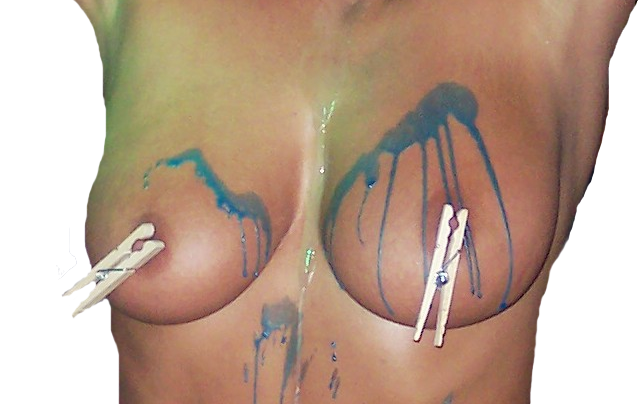
Breast torture using wax play combined with clothespins on nipples

Nipple torture, also called BDSM nipple play, is the application of erotic pain to the nipples. It is a popular element of breast torture. It can include biting, sucking, pinching and roughly touching or rubbing the nipples and the areolae. Submissives who experience it often enjoy it, even though it is painful. Nipples are an erogenous zone of the body and their stimulation using techniques such as pinching can in some cases lead to orgasm.

During the 1970s, a study of S&M-themed contact magazines and club members in Germany identified nipple torture as one of the six most popular activities. BDSM literature sometimes shows household items attached to erect nipples to provide a pinching sensation. These include clothespins and mousetraps. There are also commercially produced devices designed for nipple torture such as nipple clamps, which are sold as sex toys. Alternatively nipple clamps may be attached to ropes, chains, or wall fixtures.

The pinching produced by nipple clamps restricts the blood flow and, when the attachments are removed, further pain may be caused by the return of normal blood flow.

A titty twister is a BDSM device used to inflict pain on the breasts and especially the nipples by nipple clamps that can be made to rotate once in position, twisting the breasts and nipples of the person wearing the device.

Nipple torture can result in damage to the nipples. Regular heavy nipple play that produces scabbing and bruising can cause internal scar tissue and de-sensitization, resulting in permanent nerve and tissue damage.

=== Suction ===
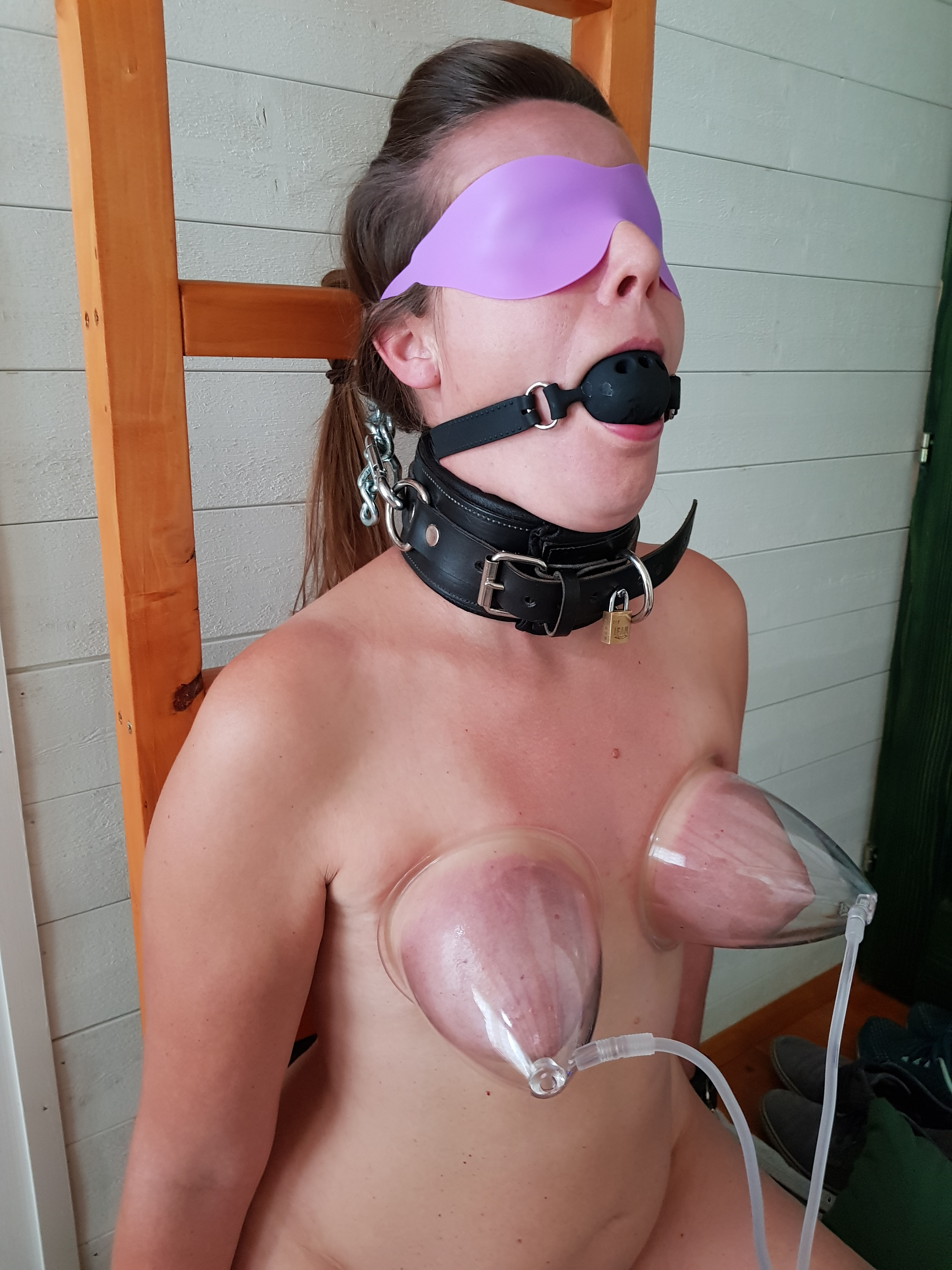
Breast torture using vacuum pump

Nipple suckers, also known as nipple suction cups, are small cylindrical devices used to produce full nipple erections by pulling on the nipples. This increases the blood flow to the nipples and hence their sensitivity.

Breast pumps can be used for erotic lactation as part of BDSM play. They can trigger lactation without pregnancy, allowing for the milking of a submissive's breasts. Some vacuum pumps have cups large enough to cover the entire breast.

Suction is sometimes applied to the breasts via erotic cupping, a technique in which cups, bowls or bells are used to create suction on the skin in a method similar to the cupping therapy used in alternative medicine. The sensation can be erotic, and drawing blood to the skin can make the area more sensitive once the cups are removed. Larger cups create more suction, which makes the resulting sensations more intense. The practice can also cause pain and leave bruised marks on the skin.

=== Piercing ===
Nipple piercings are sometimes used to facilitate breast torture. Once inserted, piercing rings can simply be pulled as part of BDSM play. Alternatively they can be attached to chains or cords (pieces of thin rope or heavy string) and the other end of these chains or cords can be attached to screw eyes or pulleys to allow the nipples to be put under tension. Nipples can have nipple rings or nipple cuffs placed around them and tightened to create and sustain nipple erections and also to cause pain.

=== Breast bondage ===
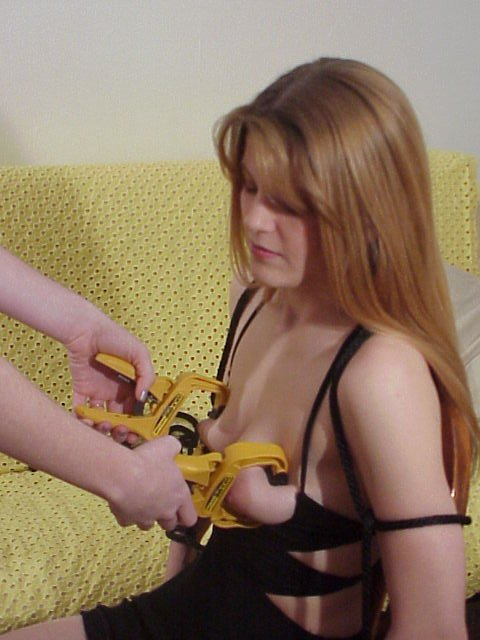
Breasts being compressed using hand clamps

Breast bondage techniques are used to compress, bind, lift or squash the breasts, which in turn makes them more sensitive and erotically stimulates them, while focussing the submissive's attention on their submissive state and their vulnerability. The high concentration of nerve endings in the breasts means that having them tied tightly can be a painful experience. Breast torture may include binding the breasts with ropes, chains, wire or bondage tape, or heavy rubber bands may be placed around the base of the breasts. Tight breast bondage is often depicted in BDSM imagery, usually using rope bondage techniques which are often derived from Japanese bondage, although breast bondage differs from most bondage techniques in that it is not intended to restrict mobility.

Breasts are sometimes compressed using a breast press. This device consists of two parallel bars or boards separated and fastened at either end by steel bolts or adjustable screws. The press is slightly longer than the width of the two breasts and typically made of wood or steel bars. Many of these devices are custom made at home. The breasts are placed between the bars and the bolts or screws are tightened to painfully compress them. The device is mostly effective on larger breasts. Sometimes the insides of the bars are lined with sandpaper or other uncomfortable surfaces for additional pain.

Breast bondage ropes, particularly if tied tightly, can damage the breasts. Using conventional rope for breast bondage can result in rope burns. Ropes designed for BDSM use are typically made from soft cotton that lies flat against the skin to avoid this. If rope is less than 5 mm (0.2 inches) in diameter it can cut into the skin. Breast bondage also risks cutting off the blood circulation to the breasts and safety considerations require them not to be bound too tightly nor for too long. Possible risks include fat necrosis, hematoma and fibrocystic breast changes.

=== Impact play ===
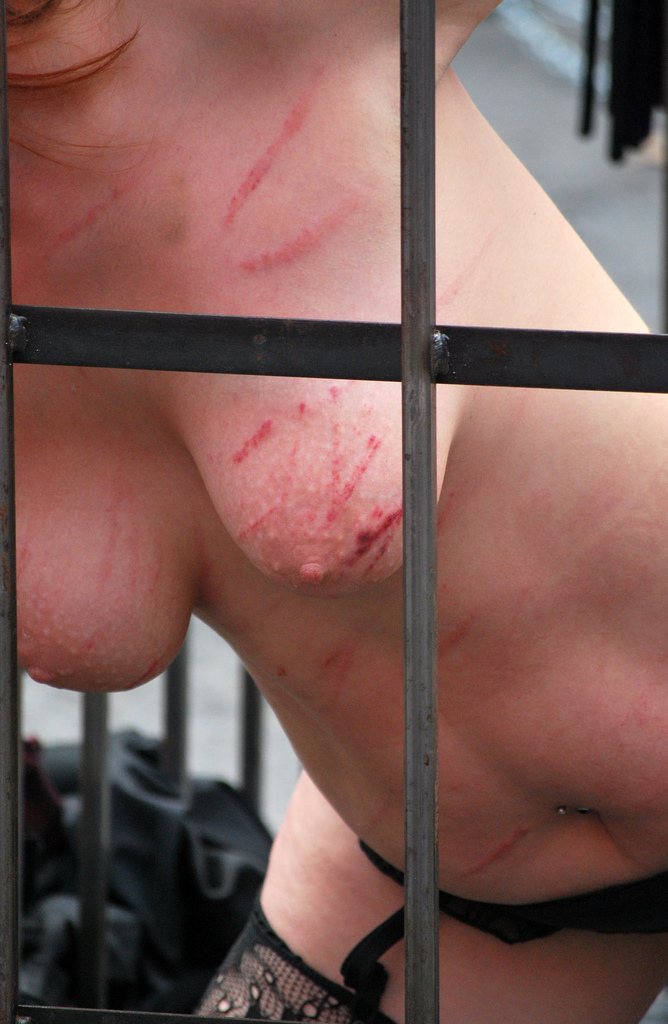
Red welt marks on breasts after being caned

Impact play can make use of household items such as spatulas and wooden spoons, or specially purchased BDSM toys. Sometimes objects are shot at the breasts as a form of ballistic punishment. Tit whipping involves the flagellation of a submissive's breasts, usually with a small cat o' nine tails whip called a flogger, or with a small riding crop. The nipples also respond to impact play.

Light flagellation of the breasts is considered to be relatively safe and the most common negative consequence of this type of breast torture is bruising. This is sometimes used as a form of intentional breast marking but it can occur unintentionally. However, repeated breast bruising can be a significant risk to health and in consequence the breasts are not generally considered to be a safe location for flogging. Caning can easily leave welts and marks on the skin and great risk to health can arise from severe caning of the breasts. Heavy impact play applied to the breasts can rupture the mammary glands and lymph glands and cause breast cysts.

=== Other techniques ===
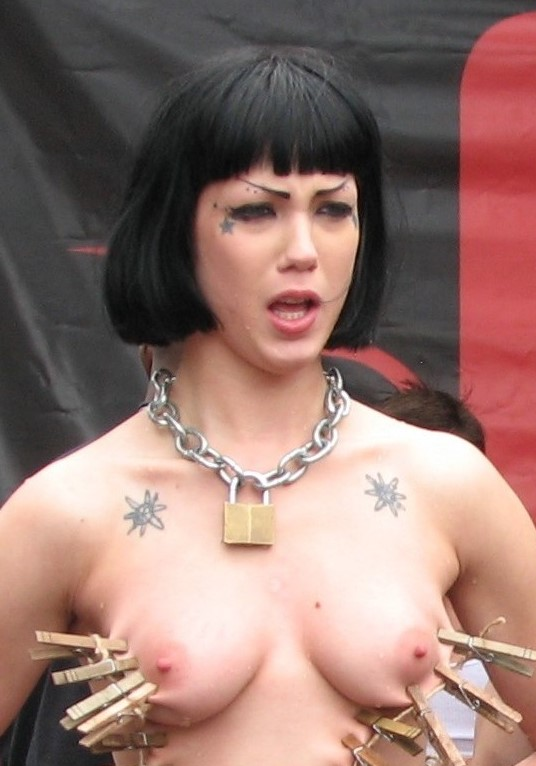
A BDSM zipper using clothespins attached to the breasts, at the Folsom Street Fair, US

Sensations such as squeezing, pinching, caressing, poking and tickling can be induced by hand or mouth or by making use of a variety of implements.

Clothespins can be attached to the breasts in large numbers to pinch the skin in multiple places. When they are removed and the blood flows back a sensation of warm pain is experienced. The clothespins can be attached together using a string or wire and pulled off, creating a BDSM device known as a zipper.

Temperature play is sometimes applied to the breasts. For example, certain types of hot wax can be dripped onto the breasts as part of wax play, in some instances producing a wax mould of the nipple and breast.

== See also ==
- Bondage pornography
- Cock and ball torture
- Discipline (BDSM)
- Erotic humiliation
- Female submission
- List of BDSM equipment
- Male dominance (BDSM)
