= Destra =

Destra may refer to:

== People ==
- Destra Garcia, female singer, songwriter and soca artiste from Trinidad and Tobago
- Tony Destra, (1954-1987), American drummer

== Politics ==
- La Destra ('The Right'), a conservative Italian political party
- Destra Liberale Italiana (DLI) 'Italian Liberal Right', a tiny Italian political party

== Others ==
- Destra Corporation, an Australian company
- Mano Destra, a 1986 lesbian art film
