= Discipline (BDSM) =

BDSM practice

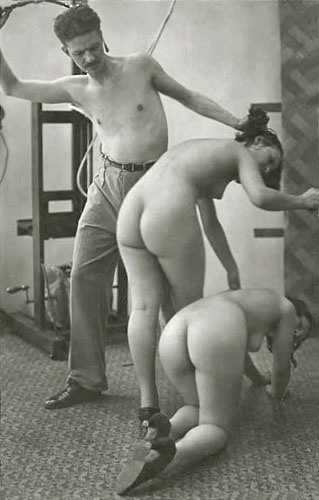
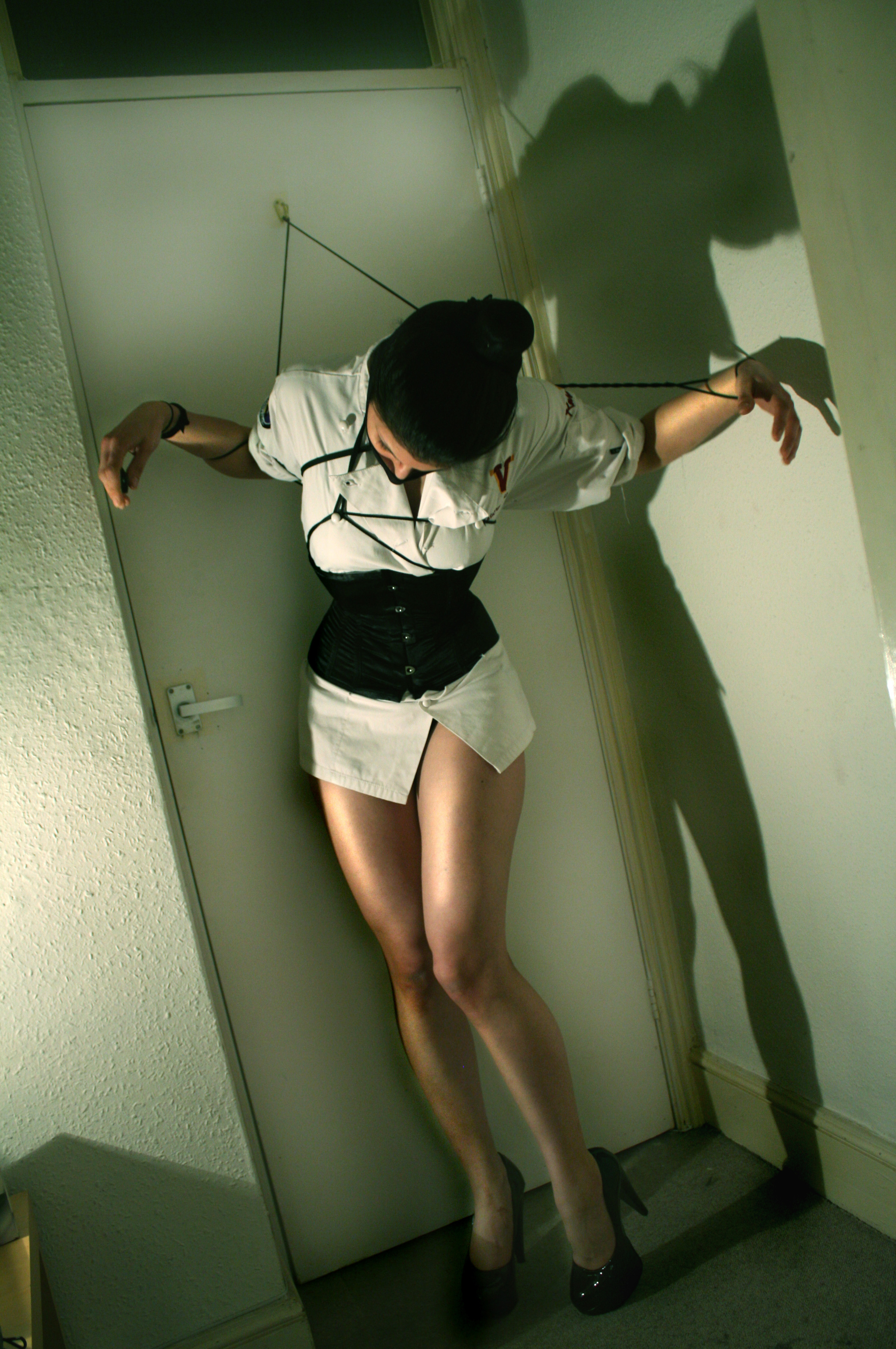
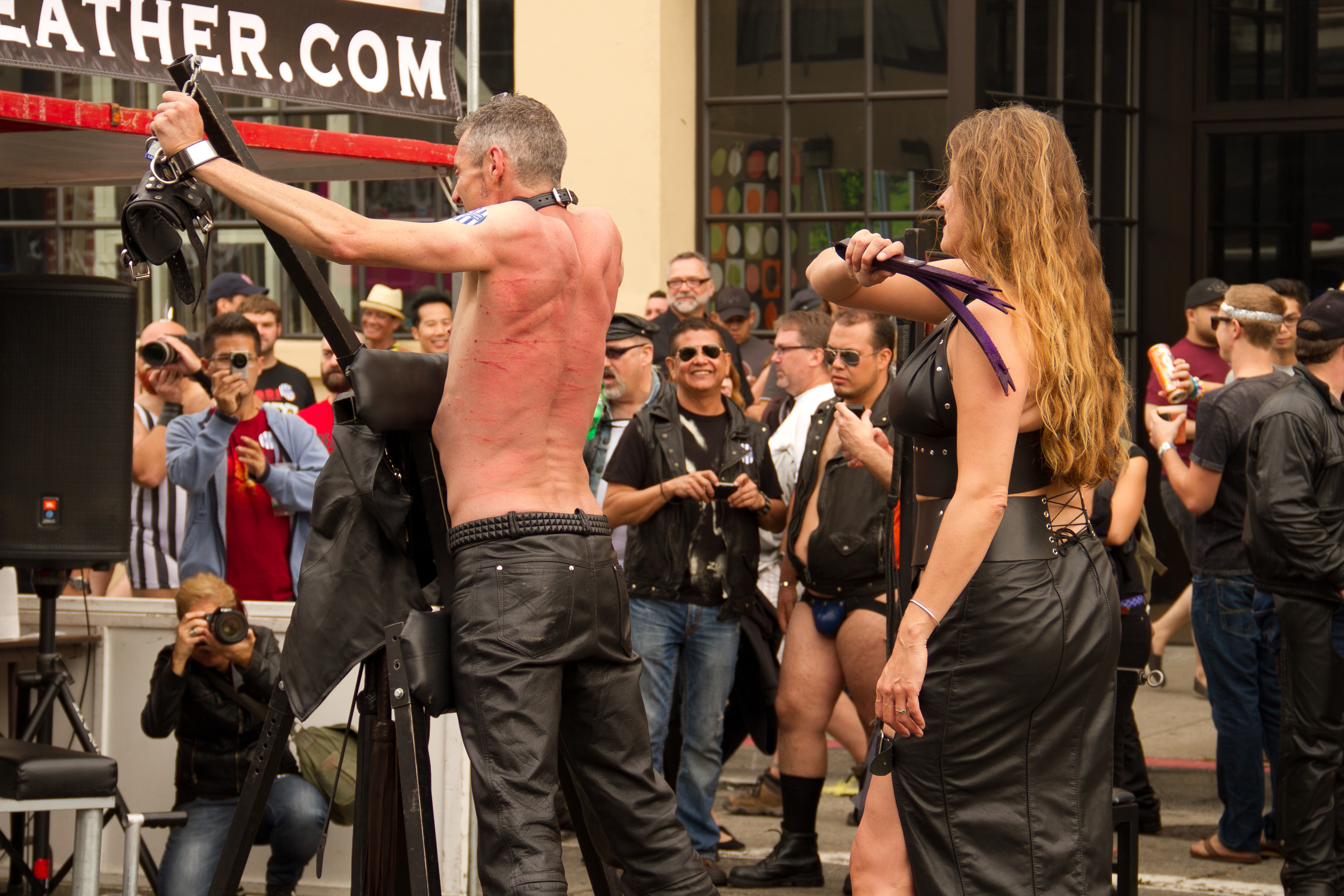
Disciplining in BDSM may involve giving punishment when rules are broken, such as by beating (top left), bondage of submissive in an uncomfortable position for long time (top right), or a combination of both, as in the example of a bound submissive being flogged (bottom).

Discipline in BDSM is the practice in which a dominant sets rules which a submissive is expected to obey. When the rules of expected behaviour are broken, punishment is often used as a means of disciplining.

== Punishment ==
In BDSM, rules can be made so that a submissive ("sub") knows how they should behave in order not to displease a dominant. Rules are usually set and agreed upon by a dominant and a submissive before the beginning of any BDSM scene and/or situation, and can also be used to help make a submissive feel inferior, or for "training" a novice submissive. In some instances, the rules can be set by a dominant for reasons both pertaining to the scene (such as fear play) and/or reasons outside of the constructed world of BDSM. When the rules are broken, even accidentally, punishment is often used as a means of discipline. Punishment in BDSM may be physical, psychological, or a combination of both; reported practices include physical punishment and verbal or physical humiliation.

The goal of discipline is to teach a submissive how they should behave as well as the consequences that may arise as a result of breaking the agreed rules of behaviour. In BDSM, discipline has been described as the training or punishment of a submissive by a dominant, and may involve withholding rewards, requiring services or degrading acts, inflicting physical pain, or using bondage itself as punishment. Community guideance on submissive training also describes negotiated rules, protocols, rewards, punishments, safewords, and regular check-ins as part of a structured dominant/submissive dynamic.

A submissive may also be given the option of choosing their own punishment. For example, for a minor mistake made repeatedly, the punishment can be an option either to be caned a few times (physical punishment) or to be paraded nude in public with a pet animal leash (mental punishment). For a major indiscipline by a female submissive, the choice can be between breast torture and pussy torture. For a major indiscipline by a male submissive, the choice may be the instrument type to be used (e.g. whip or cane) and the body part to be punished (e.g. back or buttocks) with a number of hard strokes.

Punishments used in BDSM discipline should not be conflated with sadomasochism, although the practices may overlap. BDSM is an umbrella term that includes bondage and discipline, dominance and submission, and sadism and masochism, while sadomasochism refers more specifically to deriving pleasure from the giving or receiving of pain. BDSM practices commonly involve negotiated limits and the use of safewords to communicate consent and boundaries.

Punishments in BDSM are carried out with the consent of both the dominant and the submissive. Such punishments carried out are agreed upon, set up, and talked about before the beginning of a BDSM scene or the signing of any BDSM "slave contract", and the misbehavior of the submissive is also usually predetermined before the activity begins. BDSM is sexual play, and such punishments are not carried out in a real world context. BDSM activities are predetermined, the scenes are made up, and none of it is carried out due to any real misbehavior of the submissive to any actual, real-world rule. There are "rules" separate from the BDSM scene, such as the safeword being used to signal an unwillingness to continue, and not taking part in a specific activity which makes one of the participants uncomfortable. There are also rules known as "play rules" which are set to be broken and punished in the context of play. Punishment should also not be confused with BDSM training which may involve giving pain simply in order to increase the endurance limit of the submissive. Sometimes, disciplining may avoid punishment altogether, and instead a hard glance or loud voice from the dominant may be effective.

In addition to punishment, disciplining may also involve positive reinforcement. This involves rewarding a submissive for good behaviour (e.g. being allowed to sleep on a bed rather than a hard floor).

== See also ==
- Bondage positions and methods
- Cock and ball torture
- Edgeplay
- Genital torture
- Master/slave (BDSM)
- Salirophilia
