= Matthias T. J. Grimme =

German author and publisher of sadomasochistic literature

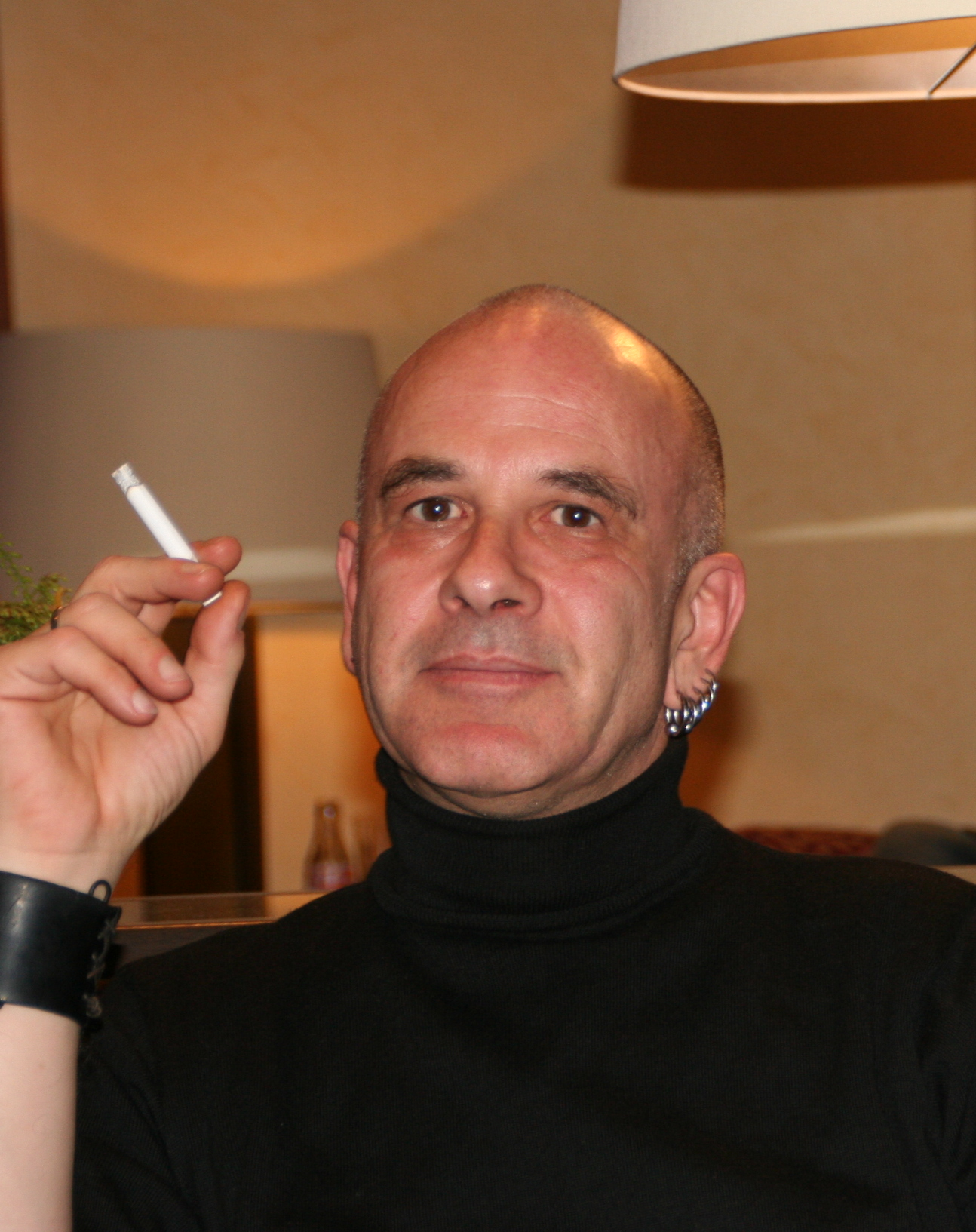
Matthias T. J. Grimme

Matthias T. J. Grimme (born 24. June 1953, in Hamburg, Germany), stage name Tatsu Otoko (竜男Dragon Man), is a German author, publisher of sadomasochistic literature and magazines, a photographer and a rope artist in Japanese style bondage.

== Life and work ==
After completing high school, Grimme studied nursing and social work. Afterward, he worked for about 15 years in various psychiatric institutions.

He worked as an organizer for the German men's movement and was a co-leader of men's groups. He published several books and stories about men and their relation to themselves.

Since 1989, he has been co-publisher of the biggest German SM magazine Schlagzeilen. He is author and editor of many articles about BDSM, fetishism, and bondage. He is well known as the author of Das SM-Handbuch (The SM Handbook) and Das Bondage-Handbuch (The Bondage Handbook), which are the German standard handbooks for BDSM practitioners. Grimme is also co-owner of the BDSM publishing house Charon-Verlag.

Grimme is one of the few internationally known German bondage riggers. He appeared in many German documentary television films (for example in 1994 in "Das soll Liebe sein" in the ARD series Unter deutschen Dächern), and he participated in several bondage productions (for example in a five-part bondage q=workshop by Charon-Verlag).

Starting in 2000, Grimme visited Tokyo several times, becoming only the second-ever westerner to do public bondage shows in Japan (East meets West, Department H, Loft plus One, Tokyo Jail, etc.). He met Japanese bondage riggers, including Eikichi Osada, Akechi Denki, Chiba Sensei, Randa Mai, Yukimura Haruki, Osada Steve, Kinoko Hajime, Kazami Ranki, Mira Kurumi and Yusuji Watanabe. Grimme's bondage style, the "Hamburg School of Bondage," is a mixture of what he has seen in Tokyo and his own inspiration.

Grimme was co-organizer of the first public SM parties in Germany, "Les Fleurs du Mal" (until 1998). Since 1999, he has been co-organizer of the "Respekt!" parties in Hamburg. He works as a BDSM performer and as an SM and bondage teacher, running his own workshops in Germany and abroad. Since 2000, he has been producing photographs and films for his "Bondage Project". Together with his bondage partner Nicole he creates "rope art". Since 2012, he has been spokesperson of the BVSM (Bundesvereinigung Sadomasochismus, National Association of Sadomasochism). Until 2013, he operated the piercing and branding studio "Stahl Stich/Kiss of Fire" together with Andrea Grimme.

Grimme has been married to Andrea Grimme since 1999. He lives in Hamburg. Since 2000, he has worked together with his bondage partner and model Nicole (stage name Ropecat) in performances and workshops.

During BoundCon 2017, Grimme received a Lifetime Achievement Award for special merits in the bondage scene and for his lifework.

== Selected works ==
- Das SM-Handbuch. Charon-Verlag, Hamburg 2014, ISBN 978-3-931406-01-1.
- Das Bondage-Handbuch. Anleitung zum einvernehmlichen Fesseln. Charon-Verlag, Hamburg 2012, ISBN 978-3-931406-71-4.
- Japan Bondage – Bondage-Handbuch Spezial. Charon-Verlag, Hamburg 2011, ISBN 978-3-931406-70-7.
- Das SM-Handbuch Spezial 1 (Ed.). Charon-Verlag, Hamburg 2005, ISBN 978-3-931406-44-8.
- SM-Handbuch Spezial 2 – Das Session Kochbuch (Ed. together with Andrea Grimme). Charon-Verlag, Hamburg 2009, ISBN 978-3-931406-46-2.
- Käufliche Träume. Erfahrungen mit Pornografie. Rowohlt-Taschenbuchverlag, Reinbek 1988, ISBN 3-499-18210-6.
- Die ungleichen Brüder. Zum Verhältnis zwischen schwulen und heterosexuellen Männern. Rororo-Verlag, Reinbek 1988, ISBN 3-499-18226-2 (together with Elmar Kraushaar)
- He is the editor of the book series Böse Geschichten & schmutzige Fotos (35 volumes, Charon-Verlag).
