= Cuffs (Iowa State University) =

BDSM student group at Iowa State University

Cuffs was a student group at Iowa State University that was formed in 2000 to discuss issues related to bondage, discipline, domination and sadomasochism.

The group made national headlines when in 2003, then-Cuffs president Harlan (Duane) Long requested $94 in funding from the student government in order to print fliers. Many people complained that student funds shouldn't be used for such a "deviant" group. However, the funding request was eventually approved by a vote of 21–9.

Cuffs again was the subject of national attention when the group was disciplined by ISU for allegedly committing assault during a BDSM-related demonstration at one of their meetings (on November 10, 2003). Cuffs unsuccessfully appealed the disciplinary ruling to the Iowa Board of Regents, which refused to hear the case. The end result of the disciplinary action was that Cuffs was prohibited from performing any type of demonstrations at future meetings.

Cuffs' last meeting was held on March 4th, 2020. The remaining Cuffs meetings for the semester were cancelled, along with all other on campus events, due to the emergence of the COVID-19 pandemic in Iowa.

The club lost its standing as a registered student organization during the Fall 2020 semester. As of August 2026, Cuffs remains inactive and has not renewed it's registration with Iowa State University.

== See also ==
- Conversio Virium - the oldest university student-run BDSM education group in the United States.
- List of universities with BDSM clubs
