= Clothespin =

Fastener for hanging clothes for drying

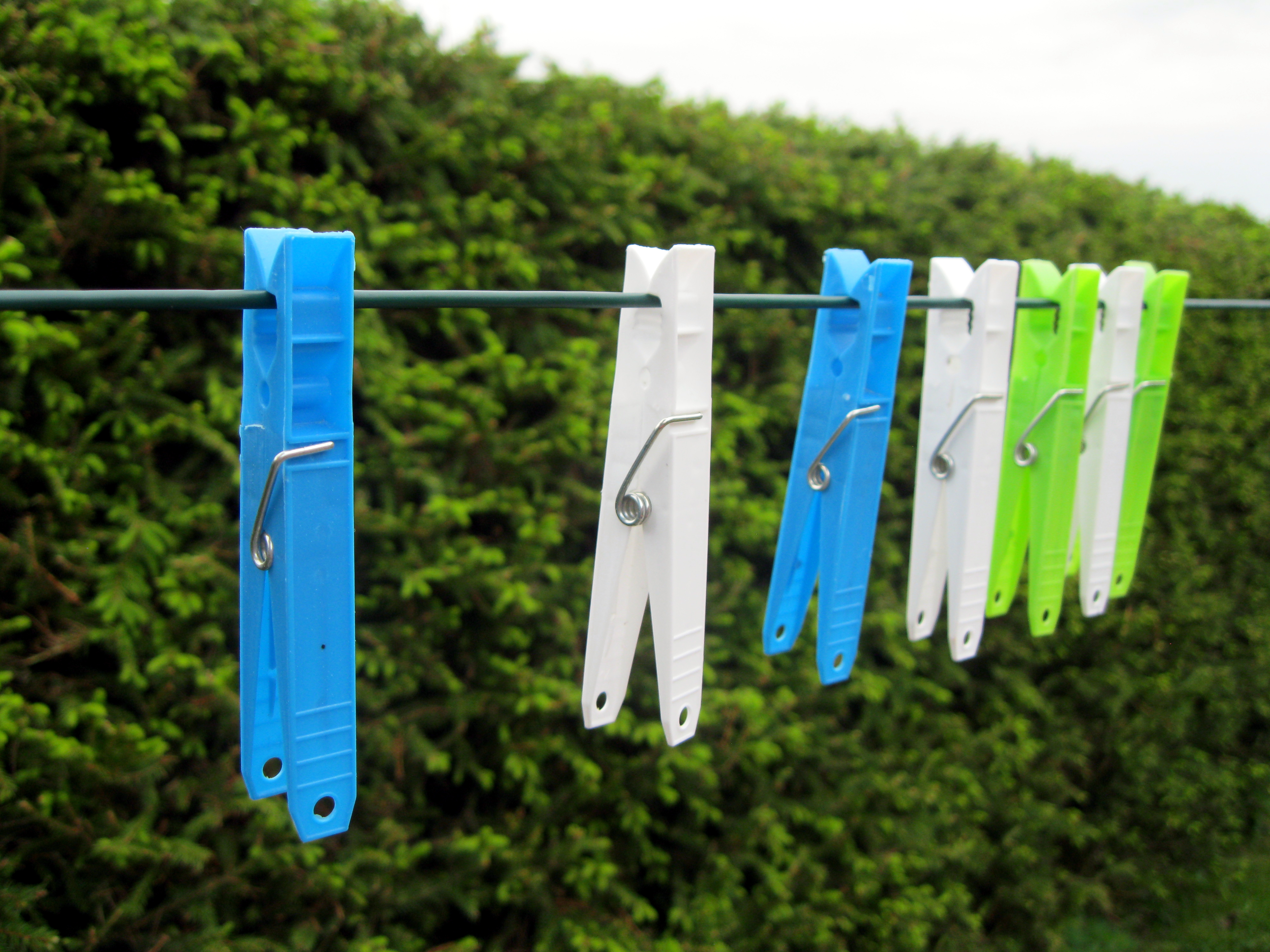
Plastic clothespins on a clothes line

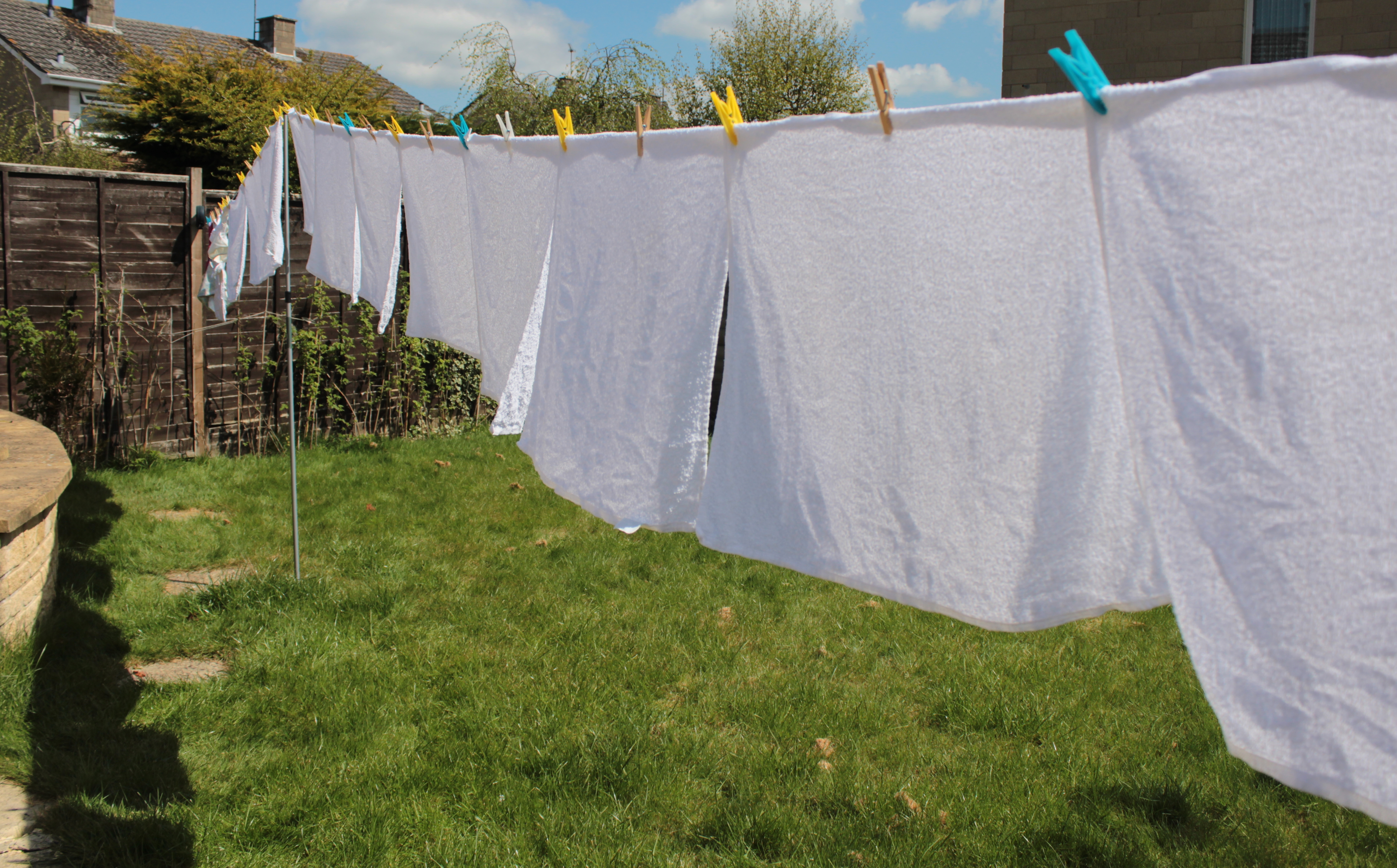
Laundry pegged onto a clothes line

A clothespin (US English; also spelled "clothes pin") or clothes peg (UK English) is a fastener used to hang up clothes for drying, usually on a clothes line. Clothespins come in many different designs.

== Design ==
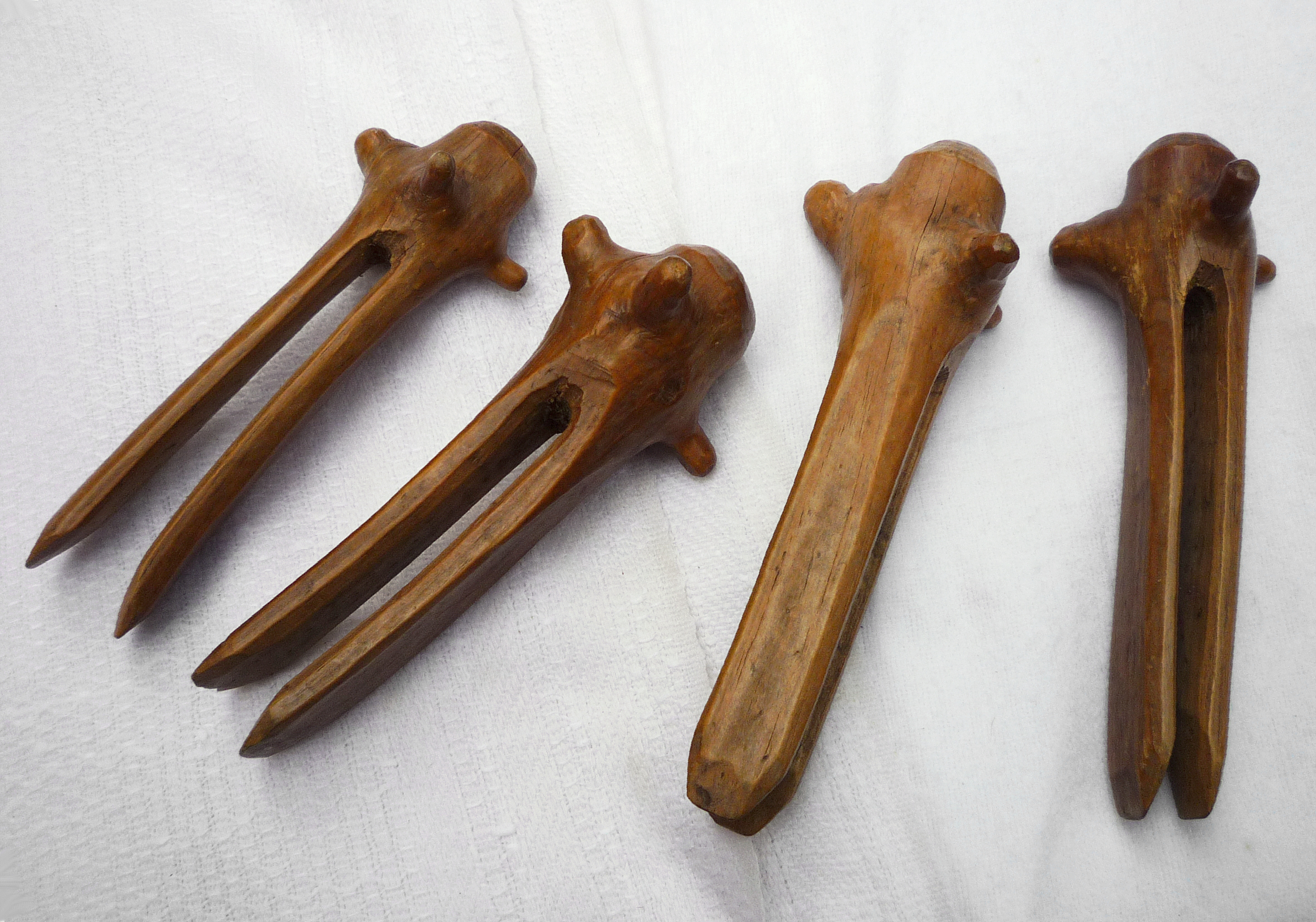
Hand-made one-piece wooden clothespins

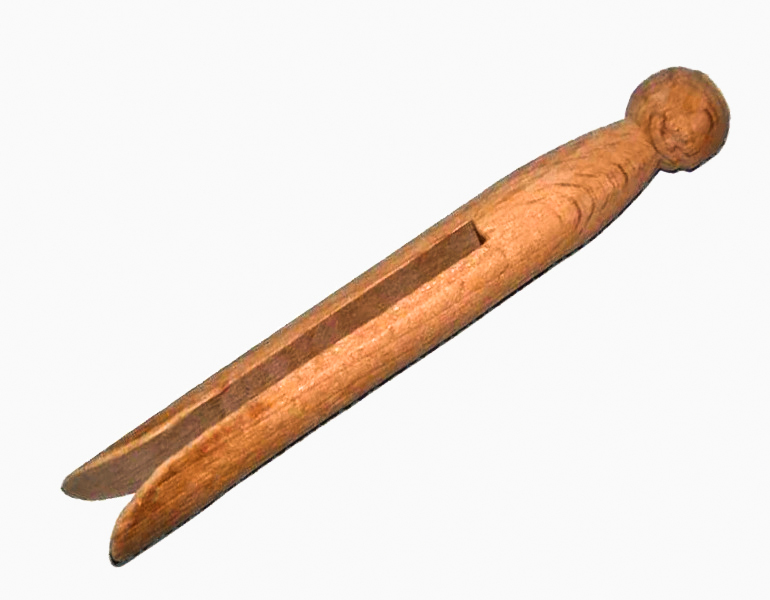
A one-piece, mass-produced wooden clothespin (also known as a 'dolly peg')

During the 1700s laundry was hung on bushes, limbs or lines to dry but no clothespins can be found in any painting or prints of the era. The clothespin for hanging up wet laundry only appears in the early 19th century supposedly patented by Jérémie Victor Opdebec. This design is fashioned in one piece of wood, with the two prongs part of the peg chassis with only a small distance between them. This form of peg creates the gripping action due to the two prongs being wedged apart and thus squeezing together in that the prongs want to return to their resting state. This form of peg is often fashioned from plastic, or originally, wood. In England, clothes-peg making used to be a craft associated with the Romani people, who made clothes-pegs from small, split lengths of willow or ash wood.

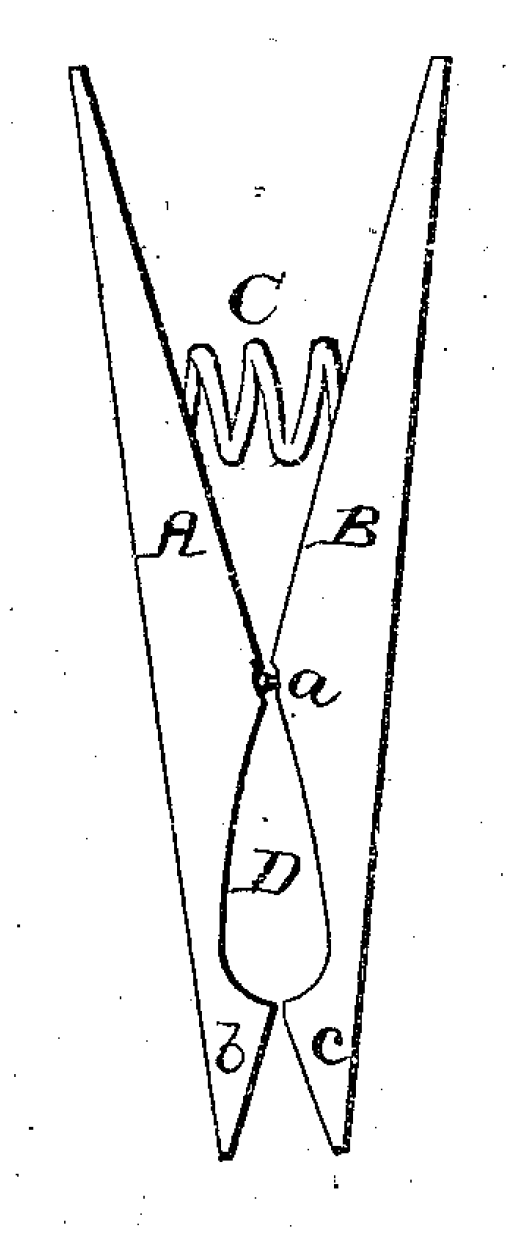
David Smith clothespin, two prongs connected by a fulcrum, plus a spring

In 1853 David M. Smith of Springfield, Vermont, invented a clothespin with two prongs connected by a fulcrum, plus a spring. By a lever action, when the two prongs are pinched at the top of the peg, the prongs open up, and when released, the spring draws the two prongs shut, creating the action necessary for gripping.

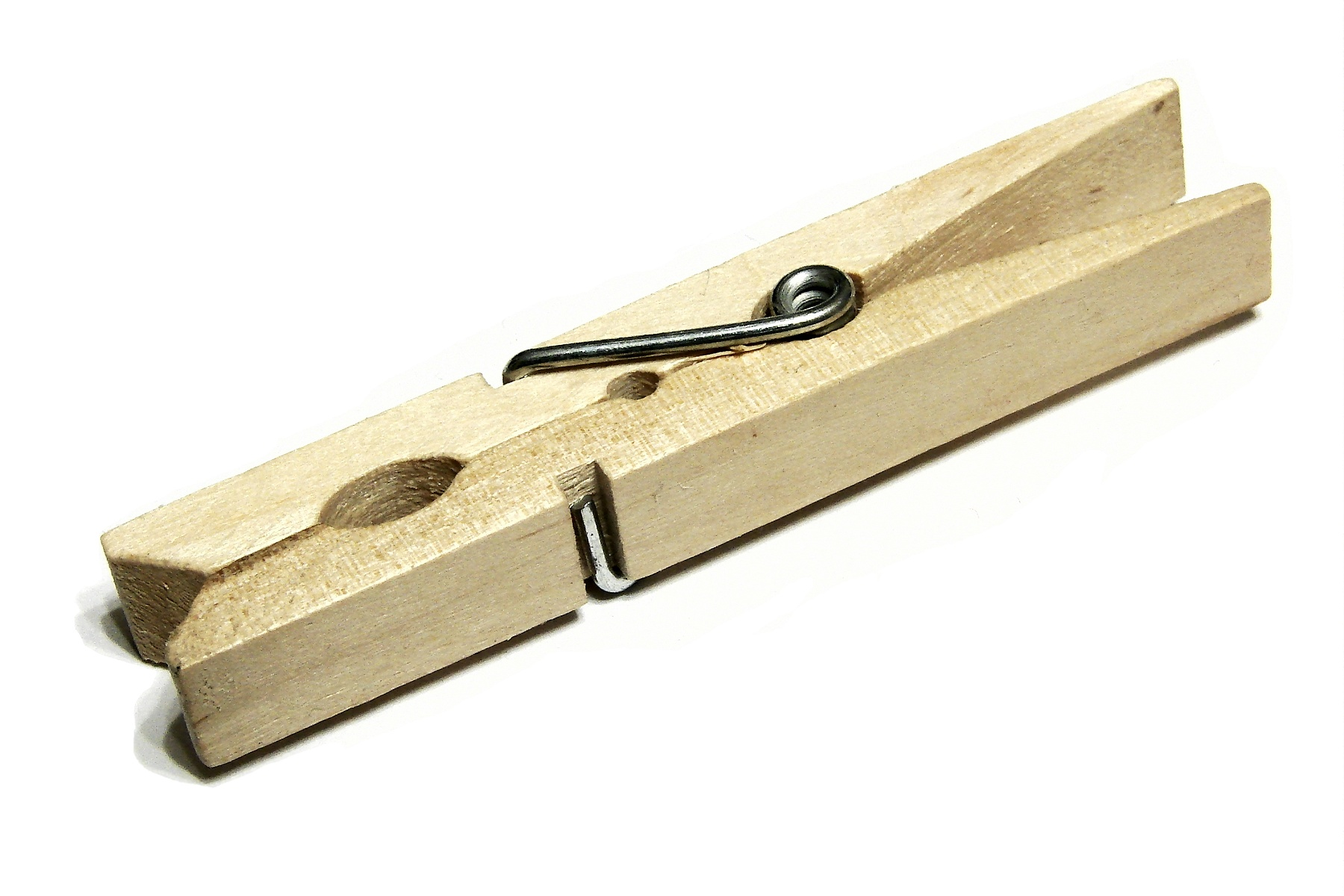
Sprung, wooden clothespin

The design by Smith was improved by Solon E. Moore in 1887. He added what he called a "coiled fulcrum" made from a single wire, this was the spring that held the wooden pieces together, acted as a spring forcing them to shut, and as a fulcrum on which the two halves could rock, eliminating the need for a separate component, and reducing manufacturing costs. This became the first successful spring-actuated clothespin, being manufactured and sold in huge quantities all across the United States.

The state of Vermont, and its capital of Montpelier, in particular, quickly became what The New York Times has called "The Silicon Valley of Clothespin Manufacturing", the United States Clothespin Company (U.S.C. Co.) opened in 1887 to manufacture Moore's improved design. Vermonter Stephen Thomas served as company president, and the company enjoyed a significant level of success in spite of the competitors that rapidly sprang up in Waterbury and other places.

In 1909, Allan Moore, one of the U.S.C. Co. employees, devised a way in which clothespins could be manufactured more cheaply, by eliminating one of the coils in the "spring fulcrum". He left the company, and with a loan from a local entrepreneur opened a competing factory, across the street from the U.S.C. Co. building. The new National Clothespin Company rapidly overtook the U.S.C. Co., consuming 500,000 board-feet of lumber at the height of production. After World War I, cheap imports from Europe began to flood the market, leading to repeated calls for protective tariffs by Vermont, and the state industry went into decline; in 1920, it cost 58 cents to manufacture one gross of clothespins in Vermont, while imported Swedish clothespins were sold for 48 cents a gross. The situation worsened after World War II, and the introduction of the electric clothes dryer diminished demand for clothespins, further damaging the industry; the U.S.C. Co. closed before the end of the 1940s. However, the National Clothespin Company, who had previously moved from its original location across the street, and had been sold to a new owner, managed to stay in business by virtue of a contract with the F. W. Woolworths department store chain. In this fashion, they managed to hang on through the following decades, in spite of a disastrous fire in 1978. The profit margin was eaten into further by the increasing volume of cheap Chinese imports; pleas for protective tariffs continued, but to no result. The company, which had discontinued its line of wooden clothespins, diversified into plastics, including plastic clothespins, which constituted only a small part of overall production. However, the National Clothespin Company finally ceased production of clothespins, the last American-manufactured clothespin coming off the production line in 2009.

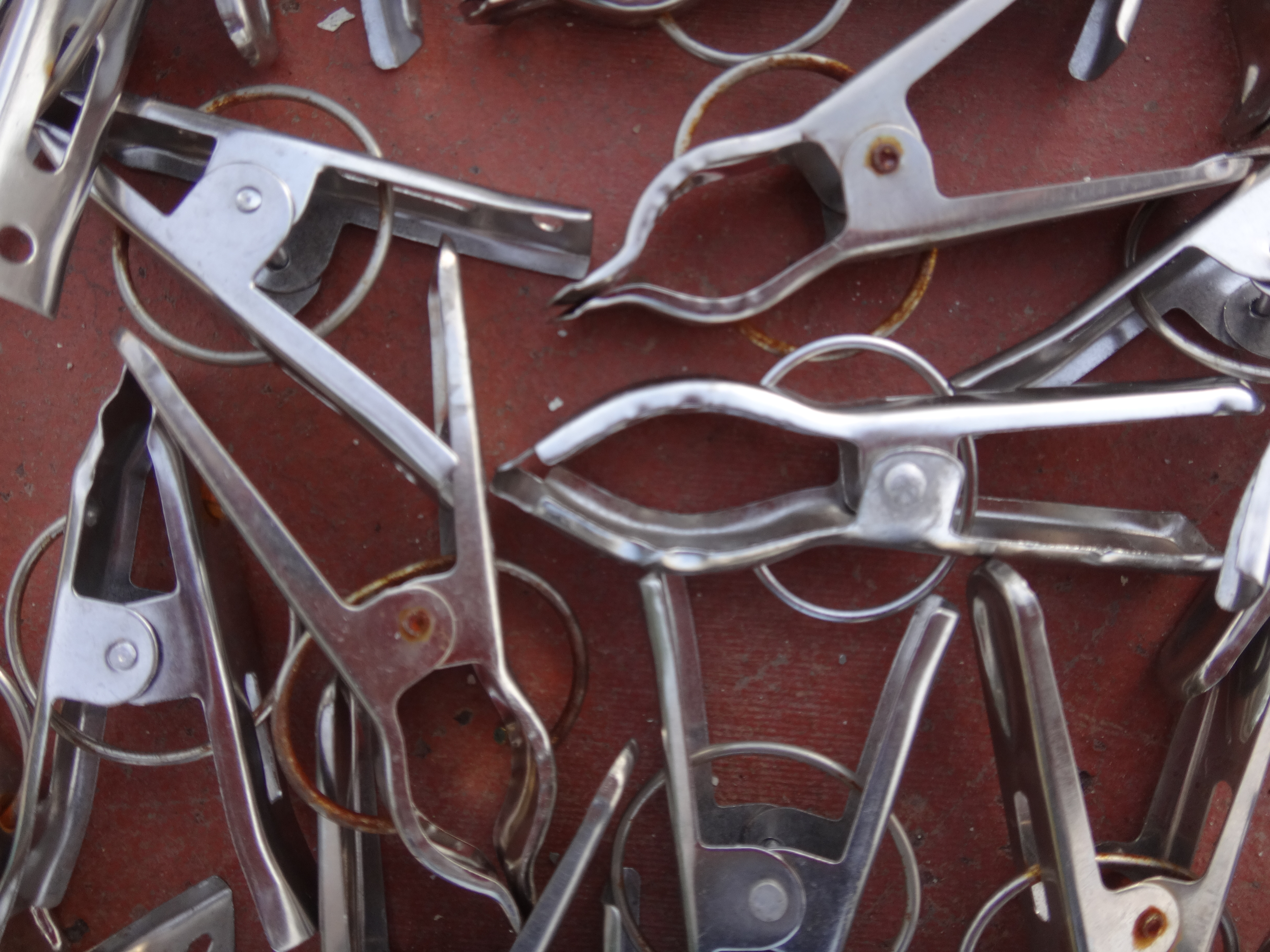
Metal cloth clips

Clothespins were further enhanced by the invention of stainless steel clothespins that do not rust or decay with outdoor use. Rather than using a torsion spring that often twists, causing the clothespin to fall apart, they rely on a strong, trapped, compression spring that results in a stronger grip.

== Other uses ==
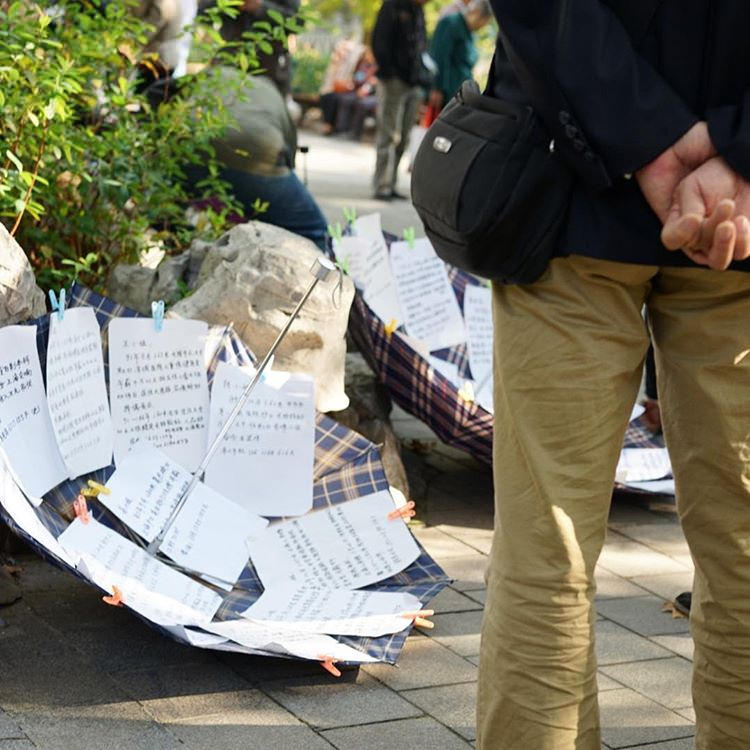
Matchmaking in China, using clothespins and umbrellas

=== Public art ===
One famous clothespin is a sculpture by Claes Oldenburg, entitled Clothespin. It is in Philadelphia across the street from the City Hall.

There is a five-foot (1.5 m) clothespin granite grave marker in the Middlesex cemetery, Vermont, marking the grave of Jack Crowell, the last owner of the National Clothespin Company, which was the last clothespin manufacturer in the United States. He originally requested that it include a working spring be included so children could play on it, but the stone workers convinced him it wasn't feasible.

=== Filmmaking ===
During the production of a movie, commercial, music video etc., a spring-type clothespin is called a "CP 47", "C47", "47", "peg", "ammo", or "bullet". It is useful on set since the lights used on film sets quickly become far too hot to touch; a wooden C47 is used to attach a color correction gel or diffusion to the barn doors on a light. The wooden clothespins do not transmit heat very effectively, and therefore are safe to touch, even when attached to hot lights for a significant period of time. Plastic clothespins are not used as plastic would melt with the heat of the lights, and metal would transfer the heat, making the clothespin too hot to touch. People like gaffers, grips, electricians, and production assistants may keep a collection of C47s clipped to clothing or utility belt at all times. Hence the nickname "bullet", as so many crew members clip a number of C47s to their utility belts, much like an old west gunslinger would carry extra bullets on his gun belt.

When a performer is in full makeup they sometimes cannot drink from a cup so they drink from a straw. When the bottle or cup is too deep for the straw a C47 is clipped one inch (2.5 cm) from the top of the straw to keep the straw from falling into the drink.

=== Lutherie ===
In lutherie (the construction and repair of stringed instruments), clothes-pegs are often used to glue on kerfing during the production of guitars, mandolins, and other stringed instruments.

=== Frequency control at radio-control model flying/operation sites ===
Since multiple RC frequency use began in the RC hobbies in the mid-20th century, so-called "frequency pins" have been used to ensure that only one modeler was using a particular frequency at any one time. The common, spring-loaded two-piece wood clothespin – marked in some manner with text and/or color-coding for the designated frequency it references, usually with an added piece of thin plywood or plastic on the clothespin to place the text or color-code upon for greater visibility – is the usual basis for these, whether the model club itself provides them already clipped onto a "frequency control board" for the modeler to take for their activity (clipped onto their transmitter's antenna, in a so-called "subtractive" method) or the modeler make them for their own transmitter(s), and places them on a club facility's existing frequency board (the "additive" method).

=== BDSM ===
Clothespins may be used during acts that involve pinching such as in breast torture or zippers.

== See also ==
- Binder clip
- Bulldog clip
- Crocodile clip
