= Fear play =

Sexual activity involving the use of fear to create sexual arousal

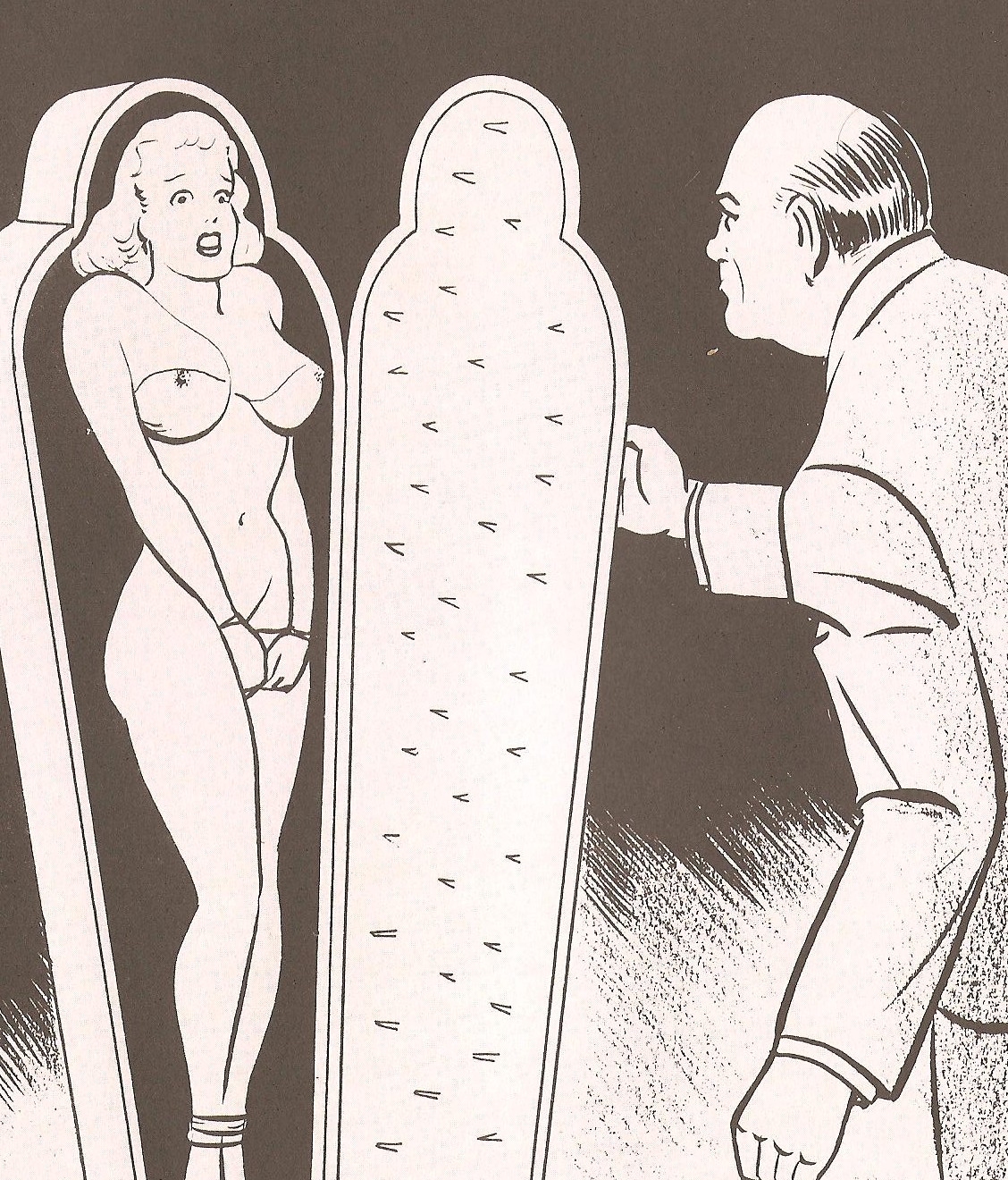
Cartoon showing a frightened woman bound inside an iron maiden, waiting for the door to be shut. Illustration by Joe Shuster from Nights of Horror magazine.

Fear play is any sexual activity involving the use of fear to create sexual arousal. Unlike masochistic tendencies, fear play does not offer the subject pleasure or arousal through a rush of endorphins, but rather a terrified mental state which triggers a release of adrenaline. Some have likened its role to that of horror movies, in providing a harmless outlet in which to feel frightened.

== Definition ==
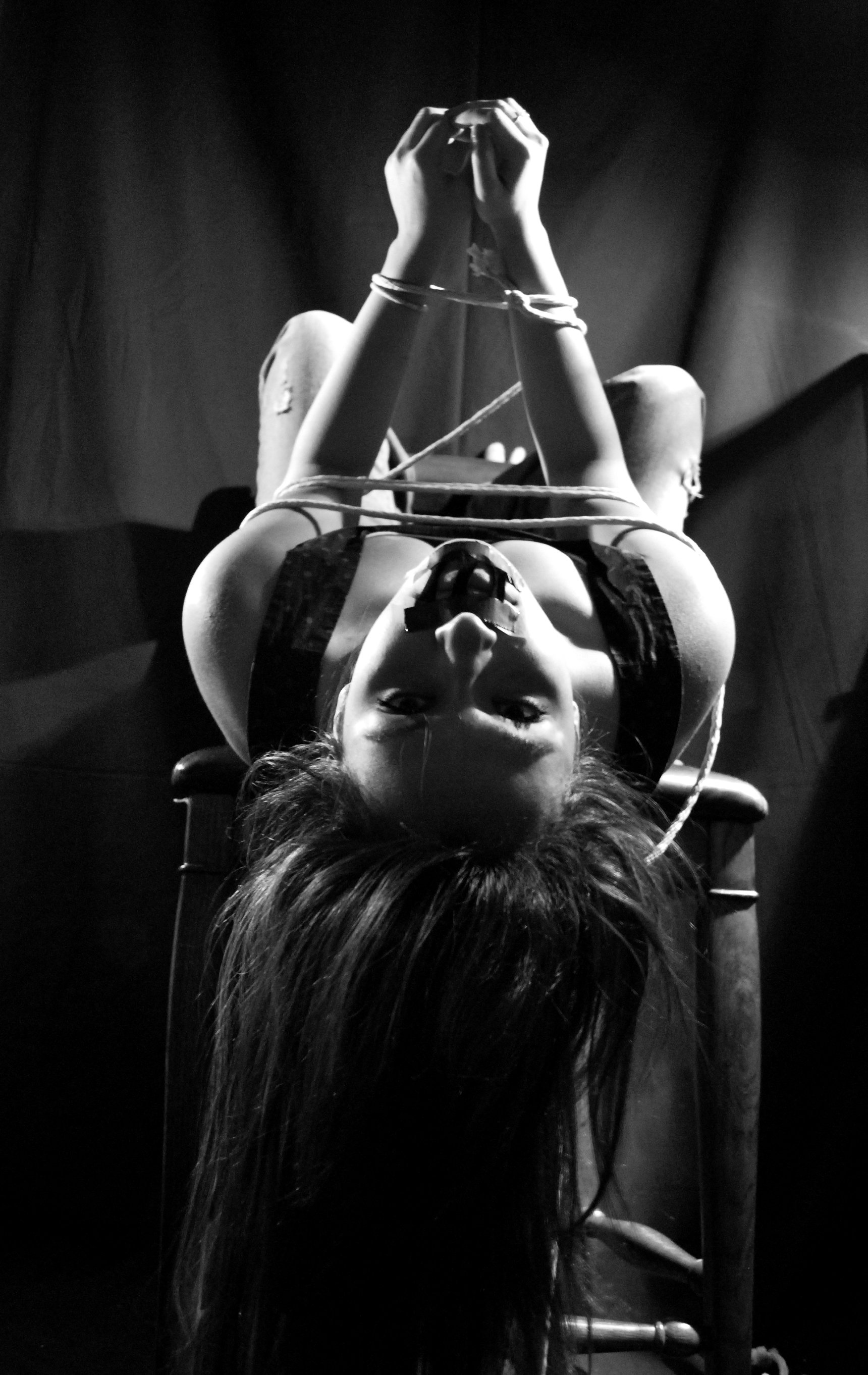
A woman is tied to bondage furniture.

Fear play is typically considered edge play, a category of BDSM-related activities with high physical or psychological risk. While limits are discussed in BDSM, they may be pushed in some edge play scenes to heighten sexual arousal as the subject becomes excited by the feeling of helplessness. Asphyxiation and castration play are common within edge play sub-sections of BDSM.

== Examples ==
Some types of fear play may take advantage of a person's doubts, such as abandonment or humiliation. Others are more physically based. Medical play, knife play, or kidnappings may include a psychological aspect of fear, but it may be the physical activity that causes the emotion.
