= Welt (bruise) =

Elongated bruises on skin

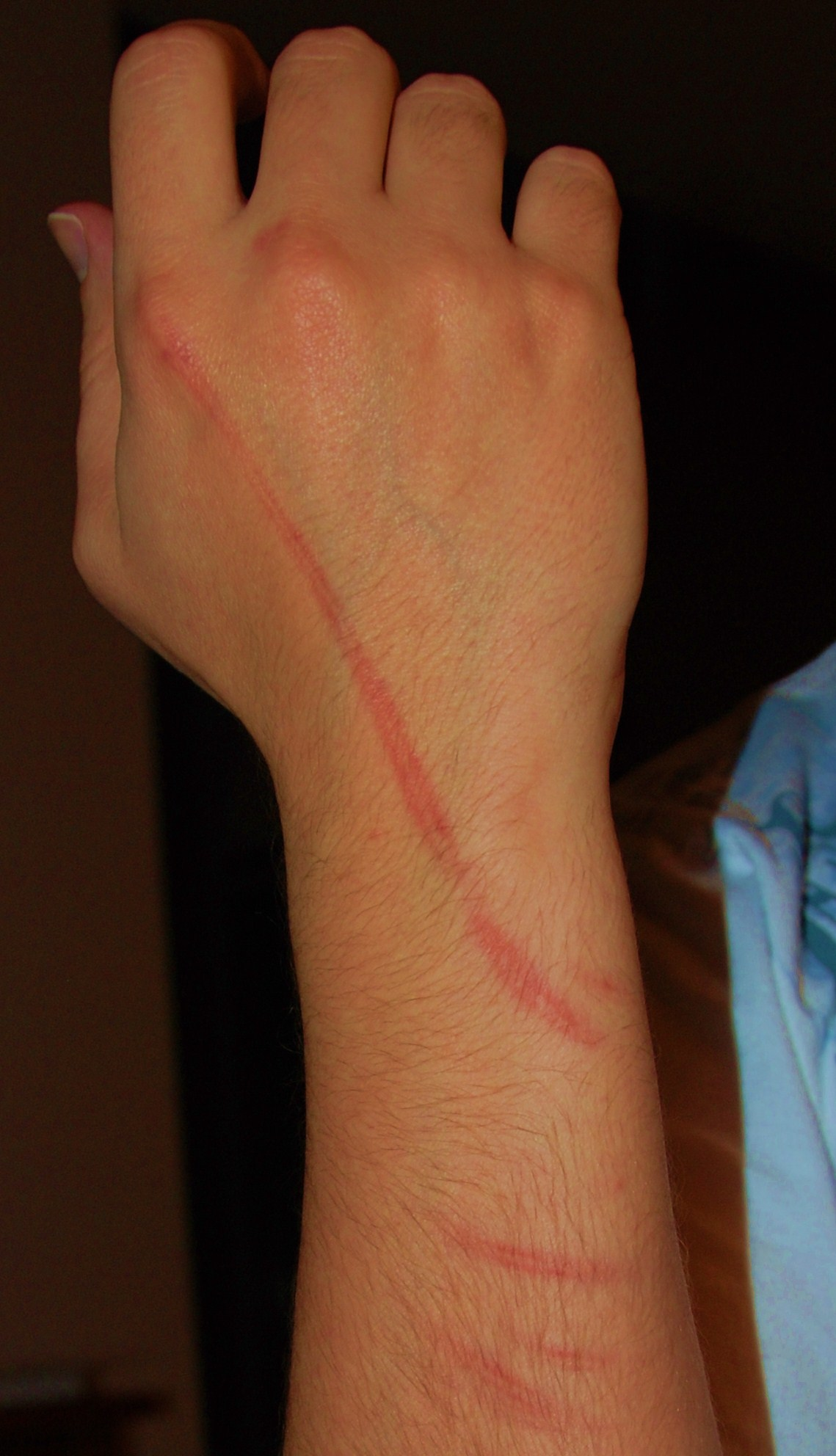
Welts on the hand and forearm

A welt is a bloodshot stripe on the skin. They are hematoma, a special form of a bruise.

Welts occur when blunt force is applied to the body with elongated objects without sharp edges. Like other haematomas, welts change their colors as they heal, which usually takes two to four weeks. The colors include purplish black, reddish blue, brown or yellowish green. That makes it possible to determine their approximate age.

A special form of welts—when the impact tool is not flat—are double welts. They occur after blows with stick-like, long objects, such as a cane for caning, a riding crop or a garden hose. The energy of the striking tool hitting the skin forces the tissue fluid or tissue matrix to the outside of the instrument. This leaves a rather anemic, brighter area of skin, so the area of impact of the striking tool on the skin is usually free of injury. However, capillary vessels located under the skin at the edges of the impacting object rupture, resulting in two parallel, striated skin lacerations. Such double straps in a child indicate abuse and require clarification.
