= Conversio Virium =

Columbia University BDSM group

Conversio Virium (CV), was one of the oldest university student-run BDSM education groups in the United States. It was the central Columbia University student organization that represented the college's collective population who engage in consensual BDSM and related activities. CV was a not-for-profit group that advocated strongly for freedom of sexual self-expression and was particularly concerned with creating a safe and welcoming environment for young people to explore their interest in alternative sexual practices, especially consensual sexual dominance and submission (D/s). CV participated in many of New York City's sexuality community events alongside similar organizations such as The Eulenspiegel Society.

== History ==
In 1994, soon after Conversio Virium's inception, a Columbia University Christian group accused CV of violating its own constitution and as a result the university expelled CV from its grounds. The accusations were eventually proven untrue and CV was reinstated as an official Columbia University student organization. In the process, CV gained many allies from both the BDSM community and elsewhere, including Robert B. Chatelle, board member of the National Writers Union at the time, who wrote to CV offering support.

In 2007, Conversio Virium made national television headlines when Fox News invited Ann Coulter to comment on an article published in the New York Daily News about the university's sex clubs called Wild Sex 101, in which the club and the university was criticized.

Conversio Virium's records are housed at the Leather Archives & Museum in Chicago.

In 2018 the club folded, before being revived in 2023. As of December 4, 2025, Conversio Virium is not listed on Columbia University's website as an existing student group.

== See also ==
- Cuffs (Iowa State University)
- List of universities with BDSM clubs
