= Zipper (BDSM) =

BDSM toy made of a string of connected clips

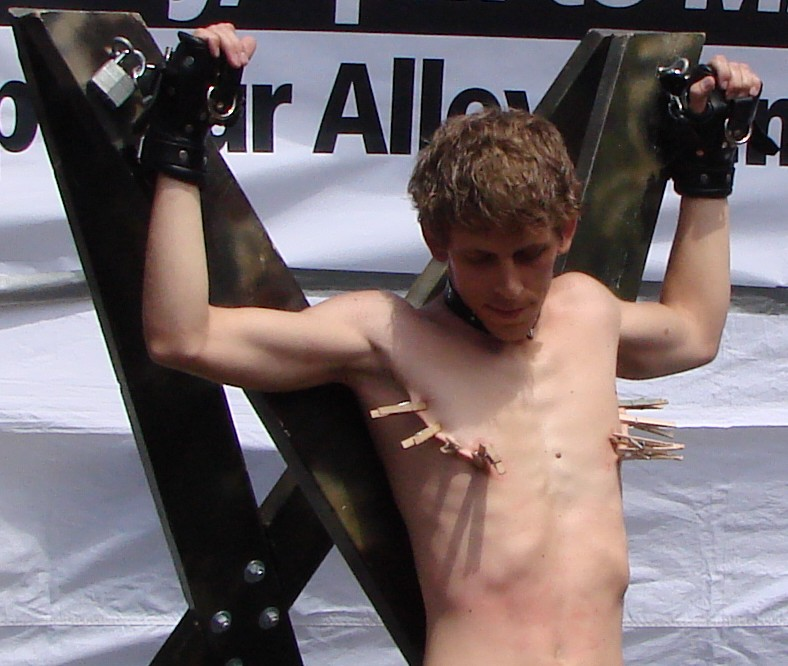
Clothespin zipper used in bondage demonstration

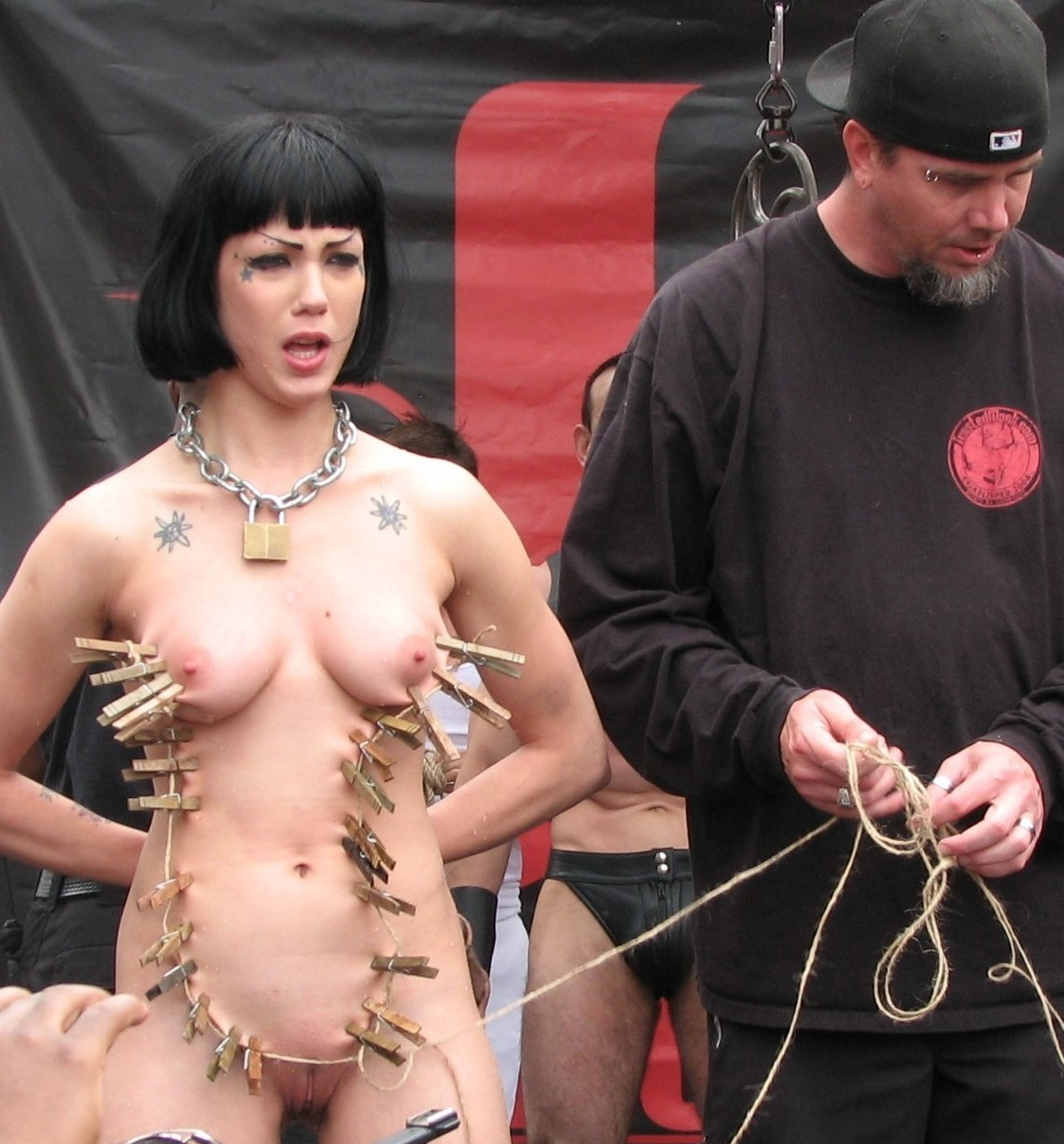
A demonstration of a zipper at Folsom Street Fair

In BDSM terms, a zipper is a string of clothespins or other clips, held together loosely by a cord or light chain.

The skin is clipped in the clips for a short time, then the cord is pulled, causing the clips to be pulled off the skin one by one in rapid sequence causing a unique sensation.
