= Mano Destra =

1986 BDSM art film by Cleo Uebelmann

- A bound woman, a central subject of the film
- Directed by: Cleo Uebelmann
- Written by: Cleo Uebelmann
- Starring: Cleo Uebelmann; Unknown model
- Release date: 1986 (Switzerland)
- Running time: 53 minutes
- Country: Switzerland

Mano Destra (Italian for "right hand") is a 1986 Swiss lesbian sadomasochistic art film written, directed by and starring Cleo Uebelmann. Shot in black and white on 16mm film, Mano Destra is a study of erotic objectification which depicts Uebelmann as a dominatrix tying a woman in a lengthy series of acts of consensual bondage. The film dwells at length on the bound woman tied in a series of positions, in a series of extended almost static shots. The film has music and sound effects, but is without dialogue.

The film is presented as a set of tableux; only at the end do we see the dominatrix and her subject touch.

Images from the film were later published in 1988 as part of a book, The Dominas - Mano Destra by the Cleo Übelmann-Group. Uebelmann was 22 at the time of the film's making.

The music is by the Swiss electro-wave group The Vyllies.

== Reception ==
Writing in Women, Workers, & Whores on Film, Ayanna Dozier comments that the film was made at the height of the feminist sex wars, a conflict within the feminist movement regarding the validity of BDSM in a feminist context. The film was shown at the Xenia women's cinema in Zurich, where it was billed as the "lesbian sado film". In one showing of the film in Munich, the film was pulled from the projector by protestors.

== Accolades ==
In Women and the New German Cinema, Julia Knight describes it as a film which explores the liberating possibilities of sadomasochism, subverting audience expectations of what sadomasochism is like. In New Queer Cinema, B. Ruby Rich described it as "deserving of instant cult status".

In The Pleasure Threshold: Looking at Lesbian Pornography on Film, Cherry Smyth states that its imagery is "beyond sex", and that "like being offered an ice-cold, luscious fruit drink on a hot day, which you are forbidden to taste, this film encapsulates desire as death, as nothingness, and yet utter completeness".

The director Peter Strickland has cited the film as a favourite and one of his sources of inspiration for his film The Duke of Burgundy. In a 2015 interview with Sight & Sound, he described it as “a very interesting [film], not really sexploitation at all, more like Chris Marker doing a female-female bondage film".
