= Temperature play =

BDSM sensual play involving hot or cold stimuli

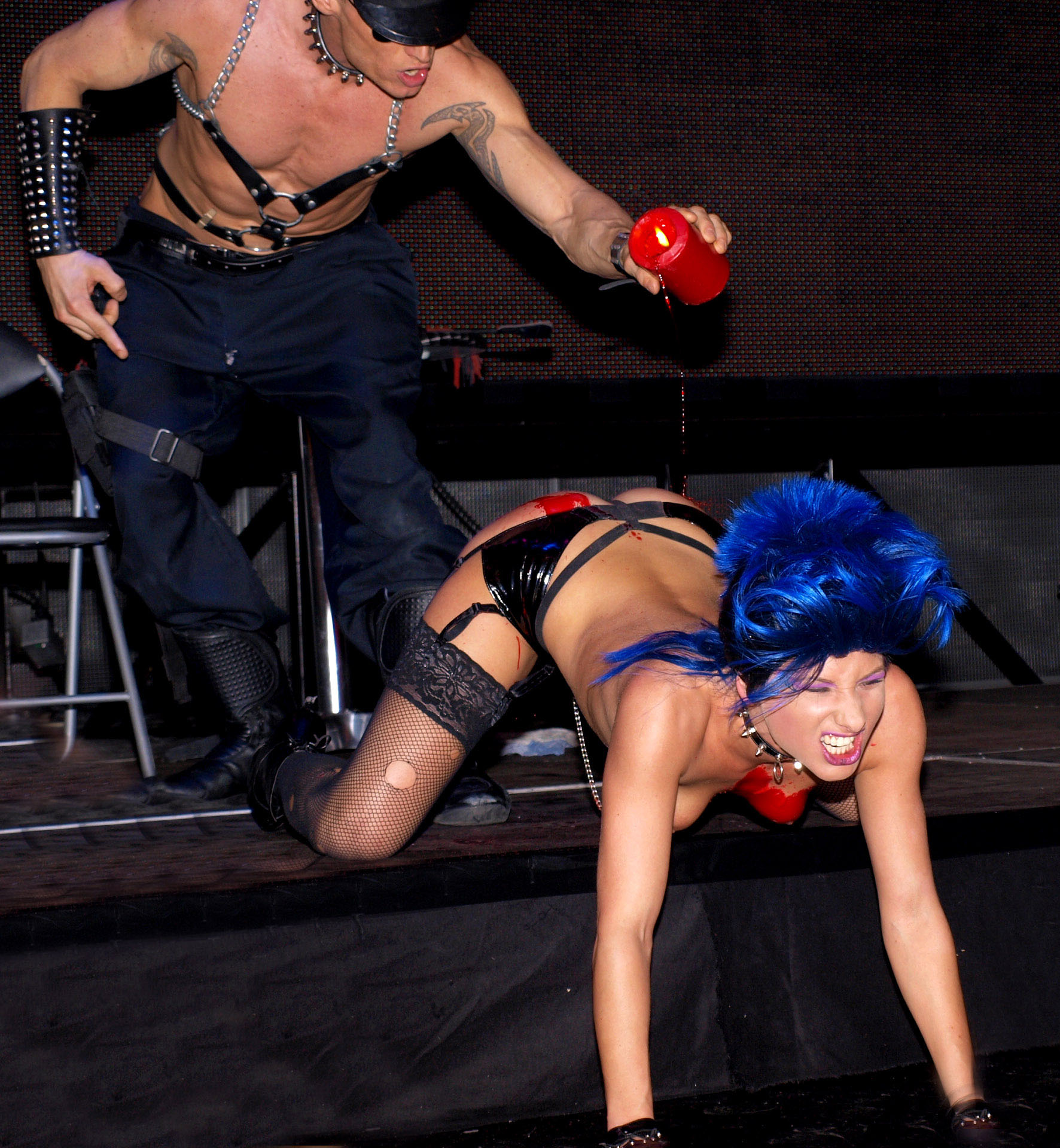
Dripping wax is a common form of temperature play.

Temperature play is a form of BDSM sensual play where objects and substances are used to stimulate the body's neuroreceptors for heat and cold for sensual effect. Substances used can include water, molten wax, ice, hot oil, chocolate syrup, whipped cream, melted butter, chilled fresh fruit and steamed vegetables. Objects can include sex toys, cutlery, ball chains and necklaces, often pre-heated in hot water or chilled in ice water. Space heaters, radiators, and other sources of heat can also be used for stimulating sensory arousal with heat. Blindfolds may be used to intensify the sensations.

Safety precautions include first aid certification, having a fire safety kit on hand including flame-retardant fire blankets, burn creams, wet towels and fire extinguishers. Regular candles are discouraged over massage candles for safety.

According to a 2022 systematic review, tolerance to heat pain appears higher in BDSM participants, particularly submissives.

== Variants of temperature play ==
=== Fire play ===
Fire play is a form of temperature play that involves using flame on or very close to the skin. The flame is typically on or applied with a small cotton torch soaked in a isopropyl alcohol as fuel, also known as a fire wand. Other common fire play toys include flaming gloves and flaming floggers; other common varieties of fuel include 70% isopropyl alcohol, mousse, hand sanitizer, super-proof rum, grain alcohol, and flash cotton. As with many forms of BDSM play, the proper tools, fuels, and safety guidelines are often in hot contention between players.

Fire play is usually considered a form of edge play - frequently exciting, but with significant dangers. The sensations inflicted in most fire play scenes aren't painful (much like hot wax play or sensation play). Fire play also rarely leaves marks on the skin - though some people deliberately burn the skin slightly to leave it red and irritated.

==== Bouncing/Streaking ====
The two most common fire play techniques are bouncing and streaking. In bouncing, lit fire wands (sometimes called batons; essentially a small torch) are bounced along the skin. This may or may not involve transfer of burning fuel.

In streaking, fuel is applied directly to the skin (commonly in straight lines, though sometimes in more elaborate patterns), lit, and then extinguished before the skin begins to burn. Frequently the fuel is applied to the skin with unlit fire wands, then ignited with a lit fire wand (sometimes double-headed wands or two wands are used to streamline the procedure).

==== Fire cupping ====
Fire cupping is where the air inside a cup (almost always glass) is heated then placed on the skin - the cooling air creates a low-pressure pocket that pulls the skin partially into the cup. Experienced cuppers can create varying strengths of suction by controlling the heat of the cup.

Fire cupping was appropriated from traditional and holistic medicine communities. Cupping was used in Western medicine to encourage blood movement as recently as the American Civil War. It is still used (often with the same name) by masseurs and in Chinese medicine (where it is said to have predated traditional needle acupuncture) as well as in traditional Arab medicine. For this reason, cupping sets can be found in some Asian stores. Some merchants will only sell sets to licensed massage therapists.

Methods include:

- Wiping alcohol directly on the skin, igniting it, and then quickly placing the cup over the area (frequently criticized as having a higher risk of burning the skin and greater difficulty creating/controlling suction);
- Holding the cup over an open flame until it is warm and then applying it to cool skin (some people feel this is the safest - though some feel that heating the glass (rather than the air) causes room for additional danger. This is also the hardest method for beginners wishing to create a strong suction);
- Placing small disks with cotton balls soaked in alcohol on them onto the skin. The cotton is then ignited and a cup is placed over the disk. (In theory, the leather shield protects the skin, but the method is sometimes criticized as too complicated and more likely to burn the skin when performed inexpertly.)
- Applying fuel directly inside the cup - the cup is then usually put on the skin with the fuel still burning (the flame will quickly extinguish from want of oxygen).

Fire cupping typically leaves small, round marks on the body that may last for hours or for days. If a single area is cupped again and again, a deep bruise may form and not disappear for some time.

Fire cupping is often combined with blood play, and is then usually termed blood- or wet-cupping. (This variant also comes from traditional medicine). The skin is pierced (commonly with needles or scalpels) before the cups are applied; the suction then draws blood out of the wound.

=== Ice play ===
Ice play is a form of temperature play that usually involves running pieces of ice across a person's naked skin. In popular culture this form of cold temperature play is frequently shown as foreplay to suggest sex with a flair of kink/interest but which may not be classed as BDSM - see movies such as Do the Right Thing, and 9½ Weeks. In BDSM, it's not uncommon for ice play to be used more elaborately. Ice is sometimes used as an insertable (for the vagina, anus, and occasionally for the male urethra), but this is risky because ice, as it melts, can form edges sharp enough to cut skin or tender tissues. Part or all of the body may be immersed in ice or ice water for short periods of time (longer periods of time run the risk of hypothermia and frostbite). Ice may be used to provide contrast in a scene that also involves warm or hot stimuli.

=== Cold and heat exposure ===
Exposure to heat and cold conditions is often employed. These are usually extremes of either of these, not usually experienced on an everyday basis.

One of the simplest ways to engage in cold and heat exposure is with metal and glass sex toys that are built to withstand temperature play. These toys can either be placed in the fridge for cold exposure or inside a sex toy warming pouch for heat exposure.

A common and easily employed type of cold torture is to make subjects stand or lay naked in snow. This can be either freely or tied up. Where a subject is tied, it may be in a stretched or splayed out position to expose as much of the body to the extreme condition. A variant of cold exposure is to water down a subject with cold water in cold or windy conditions or employing fans. The risks of cold exposure are hypothermia and frostbite.

Common methods of heat torture are to wrap a subject in plastic wrap, blankets, or leather or PVC bodysuits, usually with their legs together and their arms next to their body. Other methods include physical activity in severe heat or sun exposure. Lesser used methods employ heaters, fire or coals (known as roasting) for direct exposure to extreme heat. Other physical tortures such as electric shock are sometimes applied at the same time to make the subject exert themselves in order to generate more body heat. The main risk of heat exposure is dehydration but under extreme conditions heatstroke can also occur.

With both heat and cold exposure, other torture methods are sometimes applied at the same time. General heat and cold exposure may be used as foreplay, during which intercourse occurs or orgasm is induced.

== See also ==
- Alternative sexuality
- Food play
- Knife play
- Wax play
