= Federal Association for Sadomasochism =

German BDSM civil liberties advocacy organization

BVSM logo

The Federal Association for Sadomasochism (German: Bundesvereinigung Sadomasochismus, BVSM) is an association of various groups and persons of the German BDSM subculture. It sees itself as an information platform in the field of sadomasochism, is recognized as charitable and benevolent, and has been since the beginning of 2005 a member of the German Society for Social-Scientific Sexuality Research and officially registered as a lobbying organization at the German Bundestag.

The organization was founded on May 31, 2003, in Cologne by about 40 BDSM group representatives and individuals. As of August 2011, the Federal Association had about 400 members - including 60 groups and clubs.

== Goals ==
The aim of the BVSM is to contribute as a platform for better coordination of activities in the BDSM scene and to act as a larger association effective for the interests of sadomasochists in Germany. The organization sees its priority area of work in the networking and active support of groups and initiatives, and continues to establish contacts with other organizations at a supra-regional level. In the long term, it believes that similarly emancipated living conditions should be created for BDSMers in Germany or in the entire Central European area, as they already exist in part for homosexuals today.

Another goal is to build bridges between the different groups, currents and varieties of sadomasochism, to promote sadomasochists as part of cultural and political diversity in Germany and to promote their acceptance by the population. The BVSM addresses internal and external target groups and conducts information and education on sadomasochism by providing information material tailored to the respective target group. The information for BDSM members includes in particular practical tips as well as safety instructions, while towards the general public promotion of acceptance and the dismantling of fears and reservations are in the foreground.

The third major task of the organization is advocacy and lobbying, in which the BVSM makes itself available to the public as a competent point of contact.

== Organization ==
The BVSM sees itself as a network platform that supports and promotes the formation of supraregional structures and the work of expert working groups on specialist topics. There are committees on various topics, and in its function as an organization office, the BVSM coordinates the cross-regional networking of regional resources and supraregional events such as the BDSM Congress.
