= List of universities with BDSM clubs =

Higher education institutions with extra-curricular clubs relating to BDSM education

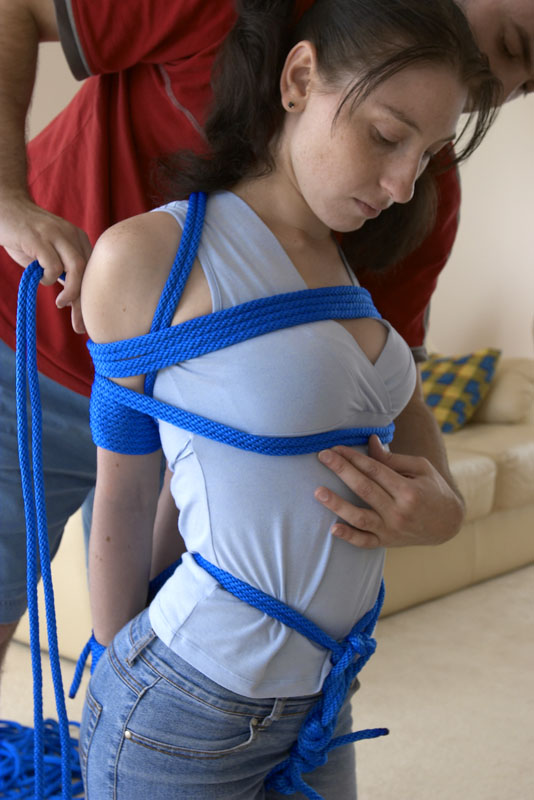
Safe rope bondage is generally an activity taught in BDSM clubs of universities. This representational image shows a male bondage rigger performing bondage on a female volunteer.

Universities and colleges with BDSM clubs exist in a number of countries, especially in the United States. Some of these student clubs dedicated to BDSM (along with sexual fetishism and kink) are officially recognized and funded by their university or college administration. The extent of nudity and consensual pain allowed in each BDSM club varies, as per the university.

The following is a list of universities that have registered student clubs for BDSM, along with sexual fetishism or kink education:

== Brazil ==
- University of São Paulo

== Canada ==
- McGill University
- York University

== Czech Republic ==
- Charles University in Prague (faculty of Maths and Physics)

== Finland ==
- University of Helsinki

== Taiwan ==
- National Cheng Kung University
- National Taiwan Normal University
- National Taiwan University
- National Tsing Hua University
- Soochow University (Taipei)

== United Kingdom ==
- Dundee University
- Durham University
- Keele University
- Lancaster University
- Leeds Beckett University
- University of Lincoln
- University of Nottingham
- University of Portsmouth
- University of York
- Warwick University

== United States ==
- Harvard University: Harvard College Munch
- Harvey Mudd College: MUNCH Club
- Massachusetts Institute of Technology: PLEASURE at MIT
- Mount Holyoke College
- Molloy University
- Northeastern University
- Northwestern University
- Ohio State University
- Princeton University
- Reed College
- San Francisco State University
- Stanford University
- Stony Brook University
- Syracuse University
- Tufts University
- University of California, Berkeley
- University of California, Santa Barbara
- University of Chicago
- University of Connecticut
- University of Minnesota
- University of Pennsylvania
- University of Southern California
- University of Wisconsin–Madison
- Washington University in St. Louis

There are American universities that do not have a dedicated BDSM club, but regularly conduct workshops on safe BDSM for students, such as the University of South Florida St. Petersburg and Hofstra University.

Some American universities, such as Texas Tech University, Indiana University and Michigan State University, have professors who conduct research and take curriculum classes on BDSM.

A few US university presses, such as those of Duke University, Indiana University and University of Chicago, have also published books on BDSM written by professors.

== Former clubs ==
=== United States ===
- Columbia University: Conversio Virium
- Cornell University: Crunch
- Iowa State University: Cuffs
- Kent State University: K.I.N.K Kent State

== See also ==
- BDSM in culture and media
- BDSM and the law
- Primal Scream (Harvard)
- Sex club
- Sex education
- Sex Week at Yale
