= Knife play =

Form of consensual BDSM edgeplay involving knives, daggers, and swords

A woman licking a knife

Knife play (also knifeplay) is a form of consensual BDSM edgeplay involving knives, daggers, and swords as a source of physical and mental stimulation. Knife play is also used as a form of sensation play and temperature play.

Knives are typically used to cut away clothing, scratch the skin, or remove wax after wax play.

== Practice ==
Knifeplay is used in various types of BDSM scenes, including medical play, consensual non-consent (CNC), and interrogation scenes. Common forms of knifeplay include cutting clothing or restraints, scraping off cooled wax, or gently running the knife over a person's skin. A training knife or the back edge of a real knife might be used in place of a real one in order to reduce the risk of accidents. Knives are also used in bloodplay in order to cut the skin and draw blood.

Sometimes the knife is only a psychological element in the scene to create the feeling of danger. The submissive may be shown a knife and then blindfolded, after which the dominant can use a dull metal utensil to create the illusion that they are using the knife.

=== Safety ===
A training knife such as this is safer for sensory play

During sensory knifeplay, it is important for the wielder to use a fake or dulled knife or, if the blade is sharp, to use the back of the blade. When cutting clothing off, the wielder should cut from the inside to keep the blade facing away from the submissive's skin.

If blood is intentionally being drawn, the cuts should be shallow and far from the neck, groin, or any other areas with important veins and arteries. Tendons and ligaments should also be avoided. The skin and the knife should both be sterilized beforehand, and first aid should be administered after.

== Research ==
=== Kinky Women Research Study ===
In 2015, the scientific journal Archives of Sexual Behavior published the "Kinky Women Research Study" by author Jennifer Eve Rehor, a San Diego relationship therapist. Rehor conducted the study at San Francisco State University while in the Human Sexuality Studies graduate program. Rehor surveyed 1,580 women within the kink community and questioned them about 126 sexual behaviors.

A 2015 article in Men's Health magazine written by Eric Spitznagel about the kink study stated that, "38 percent like "Knife play," which I’m going to assume means they like being on the receiving end of a knife."

== In media ==
A 2015 advertisement for Wilkinson Sword titled Swordplay as Foreplay showed a man and a woman cutting each others clothes off in an erotic swordfight.
