= Böse Buben =

Association of gay men in Berlin, Germany

Böse Buben (German for Bad Boys) is the name of an association and club of adult gay men in Berlin, Germany, who are interested in SM, especially in flagellation (mostly spanking/caning). Böse Buben is a non-profit organization with the "intention to be a counterbalance to the commercialized scene".

== History ==
Böse Buben usually opens five times a week (Wednesday, Thursday, Friday, Saturday, Sunday).

Böse Buben is participating in the project "safety4free" of manCheck Berlin.
