= BDSM =

Erotic practices involving domination and sadomasochism

- The BDSM initialism

Aspects
- B&D, B/D, or BD: Bondage and discipline
- D&s, D/s, or Ds: Dominance and submission
- S&M, S/M, or SM: Sadism and masochism

Roles
- Top/dominant: Partner who performs or controls the activity
- Bottom/submissive: Partner who receives or is controlled
- Switch: Switches between roles

BDSM is a variety of often erotic practices or roleplaying involving bondage, discipline, dominance and submission, sadomasochism, and other related interpersonal dynamics. Given the wide range of practices, some of which may be engaged in by people who do not consider themselves to be practising BDSM, inclusion in the BDSM community or subculture often is said to depend on self-identification and shared experience.

The initialism BDSM is first recorded in a Usenet post from 1991, and is interpreted as a combination of the abbreviations B/D (Bondage and Discipline), D/s (Dominance and submission), and S/M (Sadism and Masochism). BDSM is used as a catch-all phrase covering a wide range of activities, forms of interpersonal relationships, and distinct subcultures. BDSM communities generally welcome anyone with a non-normative streak who identifies with the community; this may include the leather subculture, body modification enthusiasts, animal roleplayers, rubber fetishists, and many others.

Activities and relationships in BDSM are typically characterized by the participants' taking on roles that are complementary and involve inequality of power; thus, the idea of informed consent of both the partners is essential. The terms submissive and dominant are usually used to distinguish these roles: the dominant partner ("dom") takes psychological control over the submissive ("sub"). The terms top and bottom are also used; the top is the instigator of an action while the bottom is the receiver of the action. The two sets of terms are subtly different: for example, someone may choose to act as bottom to another person, for example, by being whipped, purely recreationally, without any implication of being psychologically dominated, and submissives may be ordered to massage their dominant partners. Although the bottom carries out the action and the top receives it, they have not necessarily switched roles.

The abbreviations sub and dom are frequently used instead of submissive and dominant. Sometimes the female-specific terms mistress, domme, and dominatrix are used to describe a dominant woman, instead of the sometimes gender-neutral term dom. Individuals who change between top/dominant and bottom/submissive roles—whether from relationship to relationship or within a given relationship—are called switches. The precise definition of roles and self-identification is a common subject of debate among BDSM participants.

== Fundamentals ==
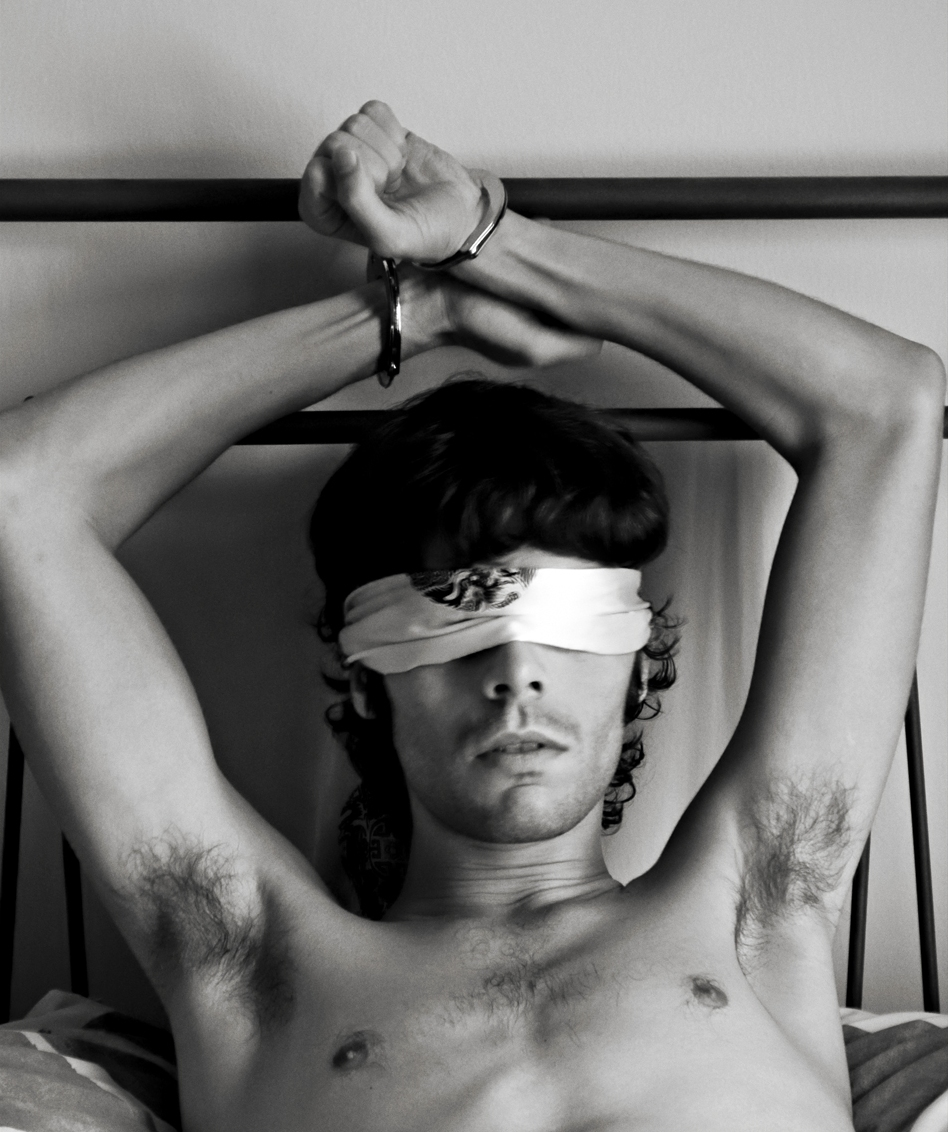
A handcuffed and blindfolded man

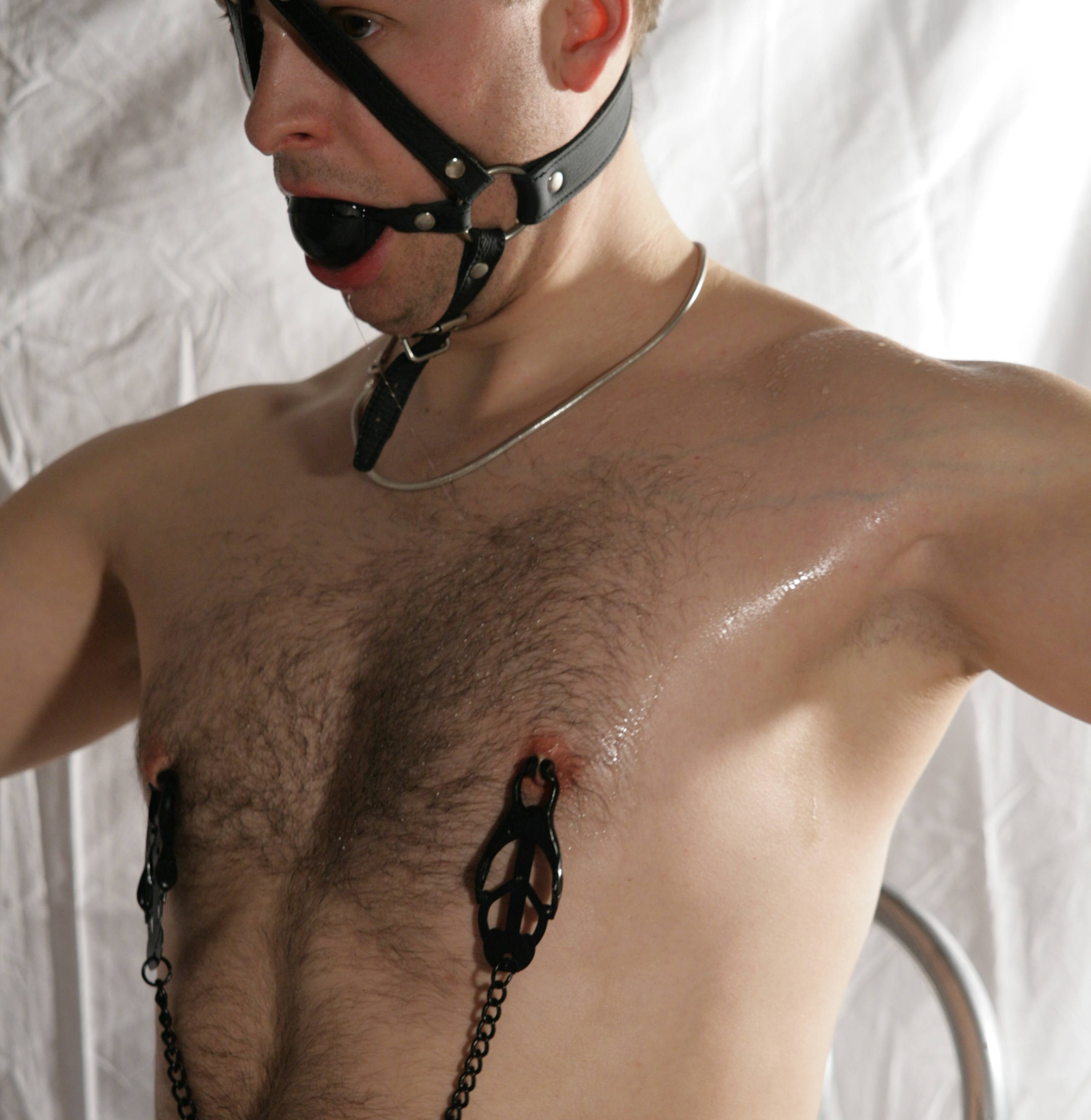
A man with gagged mouth and clamped nipples

BDSM is an umbrella term for certain kinds of erotic behaviour between consenting adults, encompassing various subcultures. Terms for roles vary widely among the subcultures. Top and dominant are widely used for those partner(s) in the relationship or activity who are, respectively, the physically active or controlling participants. Bottom and submissive are widely used for those partner(s) in the relationship or activity who are, respectively, the physically receptive or controlled participants. The interaction between tops and bottoms—where physical or mental control of the bottom is surrendered to the top—is sometimes known as "power exchange", whether in the context of an encounter or a relationship.

BDSM actions can often take place during a specific period of time agreed to by both parties, referred to as "play", a "scene", or a "session". Participants usually derive pleasure from this, even though many of the practices—such as inflicting pain, erotic spanking, ballbusting, or erotic humiliation—would be unpleasant under other circumstances. Explicit sexual activity, such as sexual penetration, may occur within a session, but is not essential. For legal reasons, such explicit sexual interaction is seen only rarely in public play spaces and is sometimes banned by the rules of a party or playspace. Whether it is a public "playspace"—ranging from a party at an established community dungeon to a hosted play "zone" at a nightclub or social event—the parameters of allowance can vary. Some have a policy of panties/nipple sticker for women (underwear for men) and some allow full nudity with explicit sexual acts.

The fundamental principles for the exercise of BDSM require that it be performed with the informed consent of all parties. Since the 1980s, many practitioners and organizations have adopted the motto (originally from the statement of purpose of GMSMA—a gay SM activist organization) safe, sane and consensual (SSC), which means that everything is based on safe activities, that all participants are of sufficiently sound mind to consent, and that all participants do consent. Mutual consent makes a clear legal and ethical distinction between BDSM and such crimes as sexual assault and domestic violence.

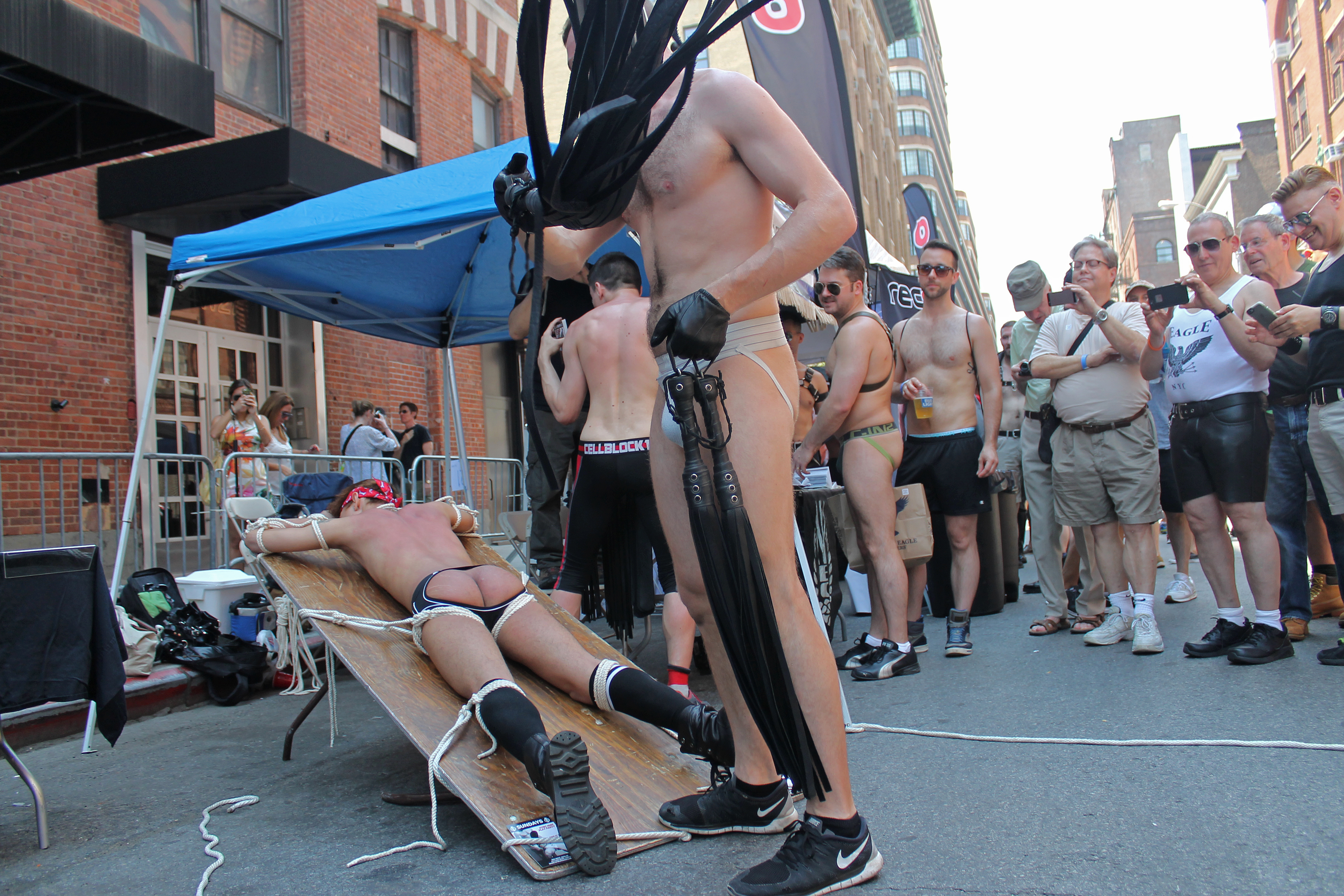
Flogging of the bare buttocks as seen in this New York street fair is a common practice in BDSM.

Some BDSM practitioners prefer a code of behaviour that differs from SSC. Described as "risk-aware consensual kink" (RACK), this code shows a preference for a style in which the individual responsibility of the involved parties is emphasized more strongly, with each participant being responsible for their own well-being. Advocates of RACK argue that SSC can hamper discussion of risk because no activity is truly "safe", and that discussion of even low-risk possibilities is necessary for truly informed consent. They further argue that setting a discrete line between "safe" and "not-safe" activities ideologically denies consenting adults the right to evaluate risks versus rewards for themselves; that some adults will be drawn to certain activities regardless of the risk; and that BDSM play—particularly higher-risk play or edgeplay—should be treated with the same regard as extreme sports, with both respect and the demand that practitioners educate themselves and practice the higher-risk activities to decrease risk. RACK may be seen as focusing primarily upon awareness and informed consent, rather than accepted safe practices.

Consent is the most important criterion. The consent and compliance for a sadomasochistic situation can be granted only by people who can judge the potential results. For their consent, they must have relevant information (the extent to which the scene will go, potential risks, if a safe word will be used what that safe word is, and so on) at hand and the necessary mental capacity to judge. The resulting consent and understanding is occasionally summarized in a written "contract", which is an agreement of what can and cannot take place.

BDSM play is usually structured such that it is possible for the consenting partner to withdraw their consent at any point during a scene; for example, by using a safe word that was agreed on in advance. Use of the agreed safe word (or occasionally a "safe symbol" such as dropping a ball or ringing a bell, especially when speech is restricted) is seen by some as an explicit withdrawal of consent. Failure to honor a safe word is considered serious misconduct and could constitute a crime, depending on the relevant law, since the bottom or top has explicitly revoked their consent to any actions that follow the use of the safe word. For other scenes, particularly in established relationships, a safe word may be agreed to signify a warning ("this is getting too intense") rather than explicit withdrawal of consent; and a few choose not to use a safeword at all.

=== Terminology and subtypes ===
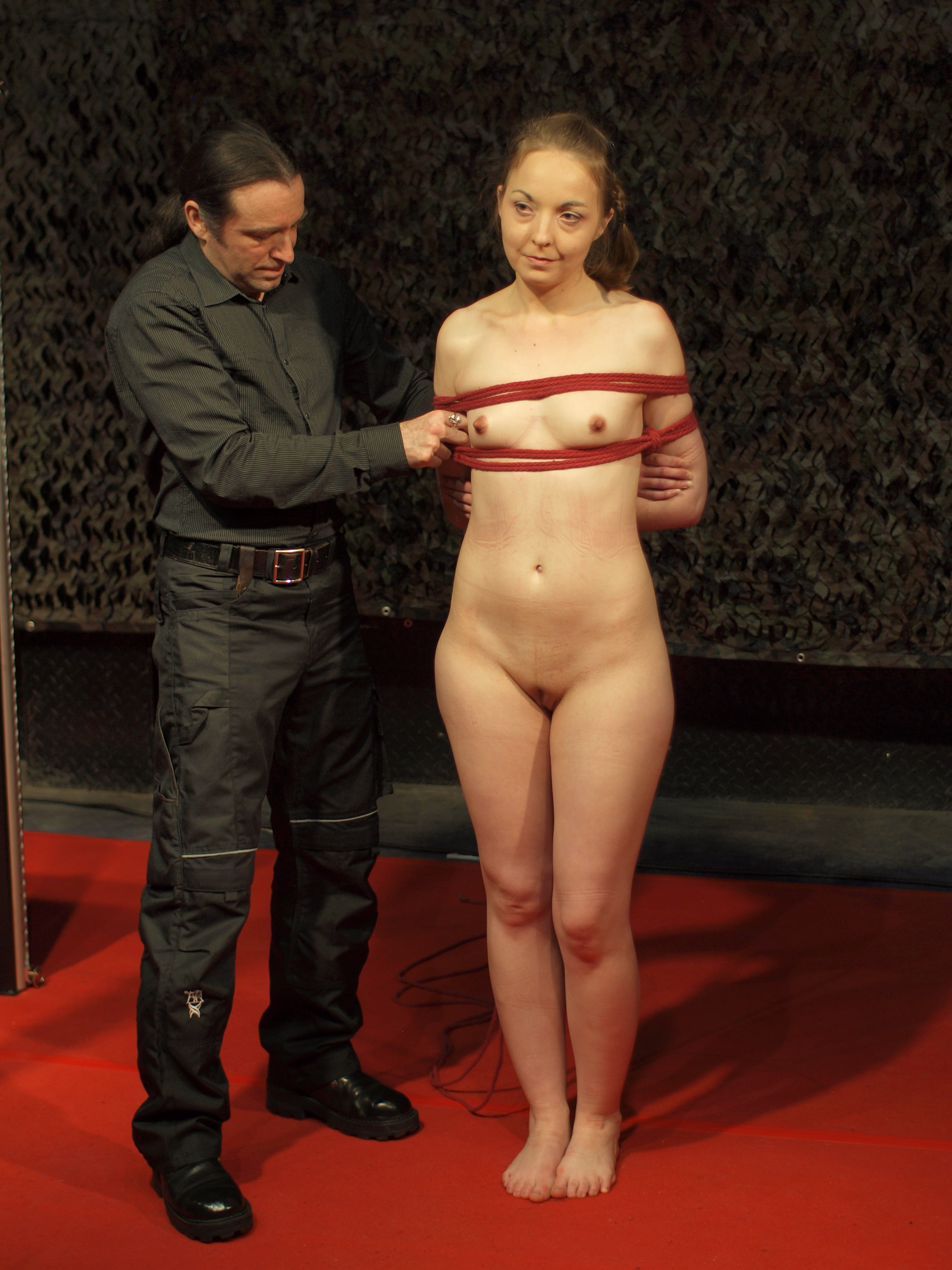
A male bondage rigger demonstrates to the audience how to do rope bondage at the 2015 BoundCon event in Germany. The bondage technique used here is box tie, a basic form of arm and breast bondage.

According to the Oxford English Dictionary, the earliest evidence for the use of the initialism BDSM is from a reply on 20 June 1991 of an anonymous user to Quarterhorse Says in a list of frequent questions from the Usenet newsgroup alt.sex.bondageFAQ. The term was reposted between 1995 and 1997 in the forum soc.subculture.bondage-bdsm. It stands for:

- Bondage and discipline (B&D)
- Dominance and submission (D&s)
- Sadomasochism (or S&M)

These terms replaced sadomasochism, as they more broadly cover BDSM activities and focus on the submissive roles instead of psychological pain. The model is only an attempt at phenomenological differentiation. Individual tastes and preferences in the area of human sexuality may overlap among these areas.

Under the initialism BDSM, these psychological and physiological facets are also included:

- Male dominance
- Male submission
- Female dominance
- Female submission

The term bondage describes the practice of physical restraint. Bondage is usually, but not always, a sexual practice. While bondage is a very popular variation within the larger field of BDSM, it is nevertheless sometimes differentiated from the rest of this field. A 2015 study of over 1,000 Canadians showed that about half of all men held fantasies of bondage, and almost half of all women did as well. In a strict sense, bondage means binding the partner by tying their appendages together; for example, by the use of handcuffs or ropes, or by lashing their arms to an object. Bondage can also be achieved by spreading the appendages and fastening them with chains or ropes to a St. Andrew's cross or spreader bars.

The term discipline describes the use of rules and punishment to control overt behaviour. Punishment can be pain caused physically (such as caning), humiliation caused psychologically (such as a public flagellation) or loss of freedom caused physically (for example, chaining the submissive partner to the foot of a bed). Another aspect is the structured training of the bottom.

Dominance and submission (also known as D&s, Ds or D/s) is a set of behaviours, customs and rituals relating to the giving and accepting of control of one individual over another in an erotic or lifestyle context. It explores the more mental aspect of BDSM. This is also the case in many relationships not considering themselves as sadomasochistic; it is considered to be a part of BDSM if it is practiced purposefully. The range of its individual characteristics is thereby wide.

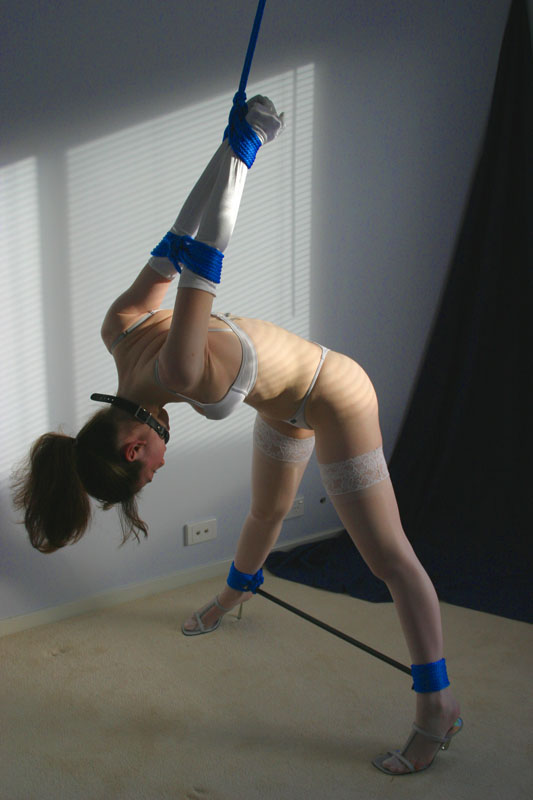
Strappado with rope and a spreader bar. This practice has a distinct effect of immobilization and pain.

Often, BDSM contracts are set out in writing to record the formal consent of the parties to the power exchange, stating their common vision of the relationship dynamic. The purpose of this kind of agreement is primarily to encourage discussion and negotiation in advance and then to document that understanding for the benefit of all parties. Such documents have not been recognized as being legally binding, nor are they intended to be. These agreements are binding in the sense that the parties have the expectation that the negotiated rules will be followed. Often other friends and community members may witness the signing of such a document in a ceremony, and so parties violating their agreement can result in loss of face, respect or status with their friends in the community.

In general, as compared to conventional relationships, BDSM participants go to greater lengths to negotiate the important aspects of their relationships in advance, and to contribute significant effort toward learning about and following safe practices.

In D/s, the dominant is the top and the submissive is the bottom. In S/M, the sadist is usually the top and the masochist the bottom, but these roles are frequently more complicated or jumbled (as in the case of being dominant, masochists who may arrange for their submissive to carry out S/M activities on them). As in B/D, the declaration of the top/bottom may be required, though sadomasochists may also play without any power exchange at all, with both partners equally in control of the play.

=== Etymology ===
The term sadomasochism is derived from the words sadism and masochism. These terms differ somewhat from the same terms used in psychology since those require that the sadism or masochism cause significant distress or involve non-consenting partners. Sadomasochism refers to the aspects of BDSM surrounding the exchange of physical or emotional pain. Sadism describes sexual pleasure derived by inflicting pain, degradation, humiliation on another person or causing another person to suffer. On the other hand, the masochist enjoys being hurt, humiliated, or suffering within the consensual scenario. Sadomasochistic scenes sometimes reach a level that appears more extreme or cruel than other forms of BDSM—for example, when a masochist is brought to tears or is severely bruised—and is occasionally unwelcome at BDSM events or parties. Sadomasochism does not imply enjoyment through causing or receiving pain in other situations (for example, accidental injury, medical procedures).

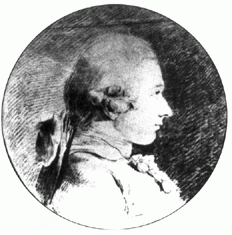
Portrait of Marquis de Sade by Charles-Amédée-Philippe van Loo (1761)

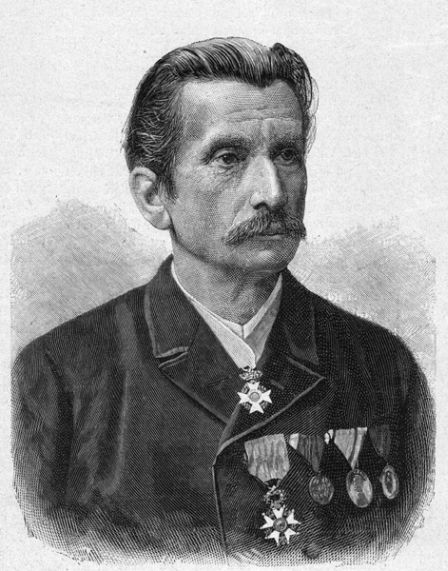
Portrait of Leopold von Sacher-Masoch

The terms sadism and masochism are derived from the names of the Marquis de Sade and Leopold von Sacher-Masoch, based on the content of the authors' works. Although the names of de Sade and Sacher-Masoch are attached to the terms sadism and masochism respectively, the scenes described in de Sade's works do not meet modern BDSM standards of informed consent. BDSM is solely based on consensual activities, and based on its system and laws. The concepts presented by de Sade are not in accordance with the BDSM culture, even though they are sadistic in nature. In 1843, the Ruthenian physician Heinrich Kaan published Psychopathia Sexualis (Psychopathy of Sex), a writing in which he converts the sin conceptions of Christianity into medical diagnoses. With his work, the originally theological terms perversion, aberration and deviation became part of the scientific terminology for the first time. The German psychiatrist Richard von Krafft-Ebing introduced the terms sadism and masochism to the medical community in his work Neue Forschungen auf dem Gebiet der Psychopathia sexualis (New research in the area of Psychopathy of Sex) in 1890.

In 1905, Sigmund Freud described sadism and masochism in his Three Essays on the Theory of Sexuality as diseases developing from an incorrect development of the child psyche and laid the groundwork for the scientific perspective on the subject in the following decades. This led to the first time use of the compound term sado-masochism (German sado-masochismus) by the Viennese psychoanalytic Isidor Isaak Sadger in their work, "Über den sado-masochistischen Komplex" ("Regarding the sadomasochistic complex") in 1913.

In the later 20th century, BDSM activists have protested against these conceptual models, as they were derived from the philosophies of two singular historical figures. Both Freud and Krafft-Ebing were psychiatrists; their observations on sadism and masochism were dependent on psychiatric patients, and their models were built on the assumption of psychopathology. BDSM activists argue that it is illogical to attribute human behavioural phenomena as complex as sadism and masochism to the "inventions" of two historic individuals. Advocates of BDSM have sought to distinguish themselves from widely held notions of antiquated psychiatric theory by the adoption of the term BDSM as a distinction from the now common usage of those psychological terms, abbreviated as S&M.

== Behavioural and physiological aspects ==
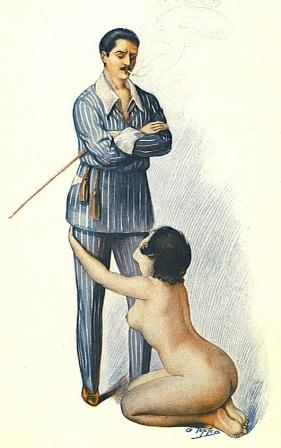
BDSM is commonly misconceived to be "all about pain". This 1921 art of a clothed male, naked female is an illustration of male dominance and female submission.

BDSM is commonly mistaken as being "all about pain". Freud was confounded by the complexity and counterintuitiveness of practitioners' doing things that are self-destructive and painful. Rather than pain, BDSM practitioners are primarily concerned with power, humiliation, and pleasure. The aspects of D/s and B/D may not include physical suffering at all, but include the sensations experienced by different emotions of the mind.

Of the three categories of BDSM, only sadomasochism specifically requires pain, but this is typically a means to an end, as a vehicle for feelings of humiliation, dominance, etc. In psychology, this aspect becomes a deviant behaviour once the act of inflicting or experiencing pain becomes a substitute for or the main source of sexual pleasure. In its most extreme, the preoccupation on this kind of pleasure can lead participants to view humans as insensate means of sexual gratification.

Dominance and submission of power are an entirely different experience, and are not always psychologically associated with physical pain. Many BDSM activities involve no pain or humiliation, but just the exchange of power and control. During the activities, the participants may feel endorphin effects comparable to "runner's high" and to the afterglow of orgasm. The corresponding trance-like mental state is also called subspace, for the submissive, and domspace, for the dominant. Some use body stress to describe this physiological sensation. The experience of algolagnia is important, but is not the only motivation for many BDSM practitioners. The philosopher Edmund Burke called the sensation of pleasure derived from pain "sublime". Couples engaging in consensual BDSM tend to show hormonal changes that indicate decreases in stress and increases in emotional bonding.

There is an array of BDSM practitioners who take part in sessions in which they do not receive any personal gratification. They enter such situations solely with the intention to allow their partners to indulge their own needs or fetishes. Professional dominants do this in exchange for money, but non-professionals do it for the sake of their partners.

In some BDSM sessions, the top exposes the bottom to a range of sensual experiences, such as pinching; biting; scratching with fingernails; erotic spanking; erotic electrostimulation; and the use of crops, whips, liquid wax, ice cubes, and Wartenberg wheels. Fixation by handcuffs, ropes, or chains may occur. The repertoire of possible "toys" is limited only by the imagination of both partners. To some extent, everyday items, such as clothespins, wooden spoons, and plastic wrap, are used in sex play. It is commonly considered that a pleasurable BDSM experience during a session depends strongly on the top's competence and experience and the bottom's physical and mental state. Trust and sexual arousal help the partners enter a shared mindset.

=== Types of play ===
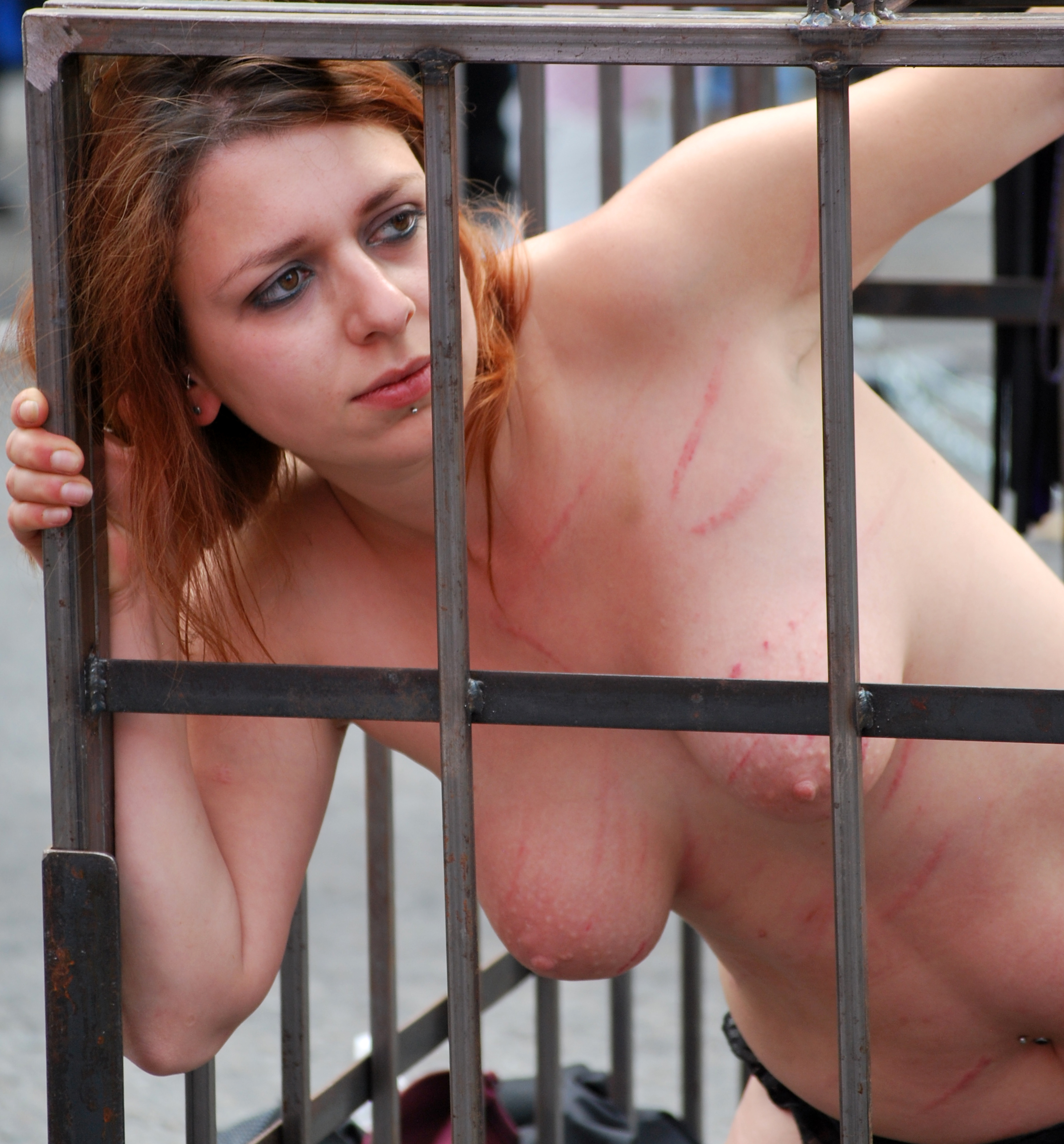
Erotic humiliation: A submissive woman publicly caged at the Folsom Street Fair in U.S., with cane markings on her body.

Following are some of the types of BDSM play:

- Animal roleplay
- Bondage (BDSM)
- Breast torture
- Cock and ball torture
- Diaper play
- Edgeplay
- Erotic electrostimulation
- Erotic sexual denial
- Spanking
- Flogging
- Human furniture
- Japanese bondage
- Medical play
- Omorashi and bathroom use control
- Paraphilic infantilism
- Play piercing
- Predicament bondage
- Pussy torture
- Salirophilia
- Sexual roleplay
- Suspension
- Tickle torture
- Urolagnia
- Wax play

=== Safety ===
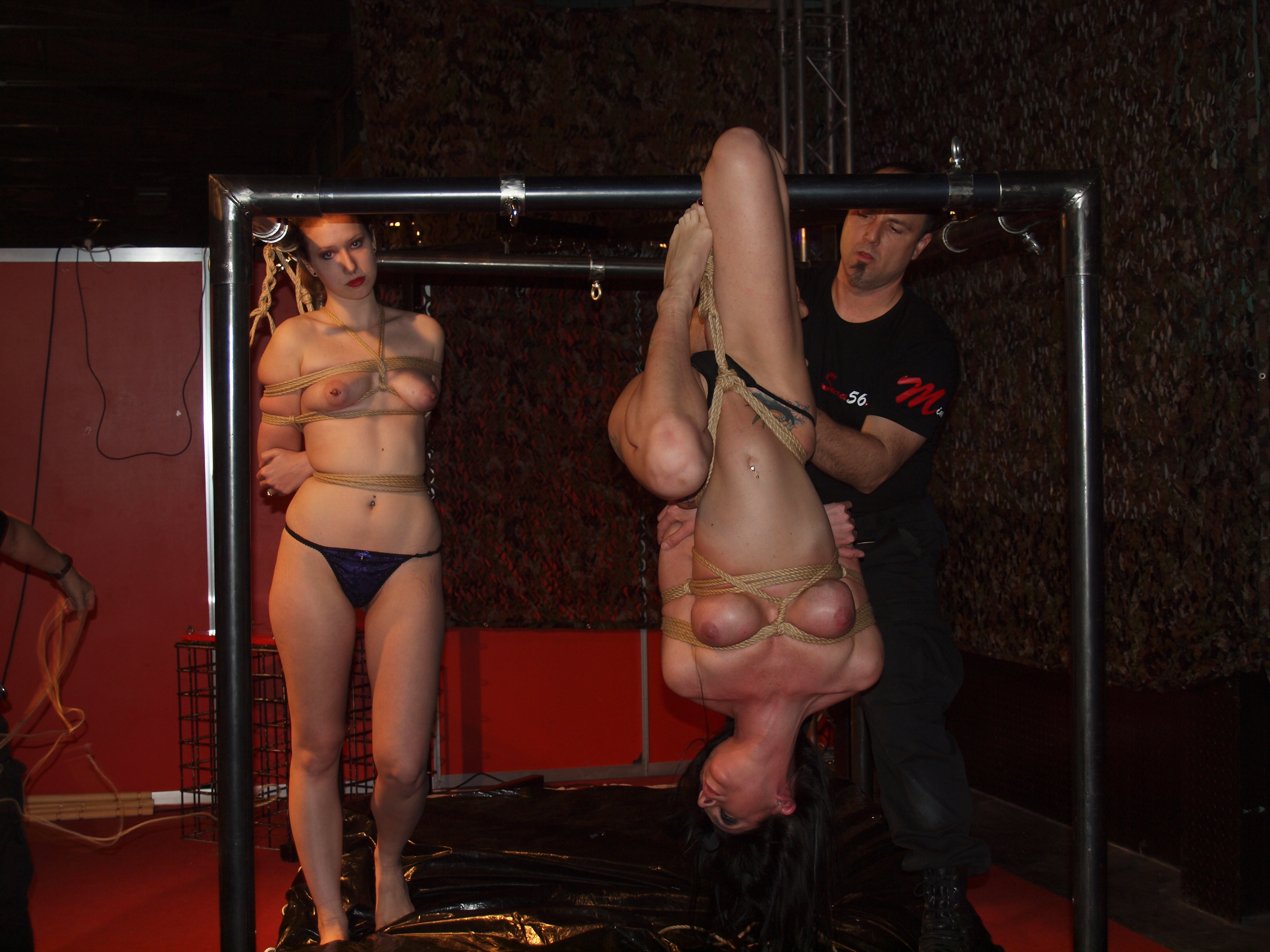
A woman being put in suspension bondage at BoundCon, Germany, 2013. Since the submissive is vulnerable to a potential fall, it is important that great care is taken.

Besides safe sex, BDSM sessions often require a wider array of safety precautions than vanilla sex (sexual behaviour without BDSM elements). To ensure consent related to BDSM activity, pre-play negotiations are commonplace, especially among partners who do not know each other very well. In practice, pick-up scenes at clubs or parties may sometimes be low in negotiation (much as pick-up sex from singles bars may not involve much negotiation or disclosure). These negotiations concern the interests and fantasies of each partner and establish a framework of both acceptable and unacceptable activities. This kind of discussion is a typical "unique selling proposition" of BDSM sessions and quite commonplace. Additionally, safewords are often arranged to provide for an immediate stop of any activity if any participant should so desire.

Safewords are words or phrases that are called out when things are either not going as planned or have crossed a threshold one cannot handle. They are something both parties can remember and recognize and are, by definition, not words commonly used playfully during any kind of scene. Words such as no, stop, and don't, are often inappropriate as a safeword if the roleplaying aspect includes the illusion of non-consent.

The traffic light system (TLS) is the most commonly used set of safewords.

- Red – meaning: stop immediately and check the status of your partner
- Yellow – meaning: slow down, be careful
- Green – meaning: I'm all good, we can start. If used it's normally uttered by everyone involved before the scene can start.

At most clubs and group-organized BDSM parties and events, dungeon monitors (DMs) provide an additional safety net for the people playing there, ensuring that house rules are followed and safewords respected.

BDSM participants are expected to understand practical safety aspects, such as the potential for harm to body parts. Contusion or scarring of the skin can be a concern. Using crops, whips, or floggers, the top's fine motor skills and anatomical knowledge can make the difference between a satisfying session for the bottom and a highly unpleasant experience that may even entail severe physical harm. The very broad range of BDSM "toys" and physical and psychological control techniques often requires a far-reaching knowledge of details related to the requirements of the individual session, such as anatomy, physics, and psychology. Despite these risks, BDSM activities usually result in far less severe injuries than sports like boxing and football, and BDSM practitioners do not visit emergency rooms any more often than the general population.

It is necessary to be able to identify each person's psychological "squicks" or triggers in advance to avoid them. Such losses of emotional balance due to sensory or emotional overload are a fairly commonly discussed issue. It is important to follow participants' reactions empathetically and continue or stop accordingly. For some players, sparking "freakouts" or deliberately using triggers may be the desired outcome. Safewords are one way for BDSM practices to protect both parties. However, partners should be aware of each other's psychological states and behaviours to prevent instances where the "freakouts" prevent the use of safewords.

After any BDSM activities, it is important that the participants go through sexual aftercare, to process and calm down from the activity. After the sessions, participants can need aftercare because their bodies have experienced trauma and they need to mentally come out of the role play.

== Social aspects ==
=== Types of relationships ===
==== Long term ====
A 2003 study, the first to look at these relationships, fully demonstrated that "quality long-term functioning relationships" exist among practitioners of BDSM, with either sex being the top or bottom (the study was based on 17 heterosexual couples). Respondents in the study expressed their BDSM orientation to be built into who they are, but considered exploring their BDSM interests an ongoing task, and showed flexibility and adaptability in order to match their interests with their partners. The "perfect match" where both in the relationship shared the same tastes and desires was rare, and most relationships required both partners to take up or put away some of their desires. The BDSM activities that the couples partook in varied in sexual to nonsexual significance for the partners who reported doing certain BDSM activities for "couple bonding, stress release, and spiritual quests". The most reported issue amongst respondents was not finding enough time to be in role with most adopting a lifestyle wherein both partners maintain their dominant or submissive role throughout the day.

Amongst the respondents, it was typically the bottoms who wanted to play harder, and be more restricted into their roles when there was a difference in desire to play in the relationship. The author of the study, Bert Cutler, speculated that tops may be less often in the mood to play due to the increased demand for responsibility on their part: being aware of the safety of the situation and prepared to remove the bottom from a dangerous scenario, being conscious of the desires and limits of the bottom, and so on. The author of the study stressed that successful long-term BDSM relationships came after "early and thorough disclosure" from both parties of their BDSM interests.

Many of those engaged in long-term BDSM relationships learned their skills from larger BDSM organizations and communities. There was a lot of discussion by the respondents on the amount of control the top possessed in the relationships but "no discussion of being better, or smarter, or of more value" than the bottom. Couples were generally of the same mind of whether or not they were in an ongoing relationship, but in such cases, the bottom was not locked up constantly, but that their role in the context of the relationship was always present, even when the top was doing non-dominant activities such as household chores, or the bottom being in a more dominant position. In its conclusion the study states:

The respondents valued themselves, their partners, and their relationships. All couples expressed considerable goodwill toward their partners. The power exchange between the cohorts appears to be serving purposes beyond any sexual satisfaction, including experiencing a sense of being taken care of and bonding with a partner.

The study further goes on to list three aspects that made the successful relationships work: early disclosure of interests and continued transparency, a commitment to personal growth, and the use of the dominant/submissive roles as a tool to maintain the relationship. In closing remarks, the author of the study theorizes that due to the serious potential for harm, couples in BDSM relationships develop increased communication that may be higher than in mainstream relationships.

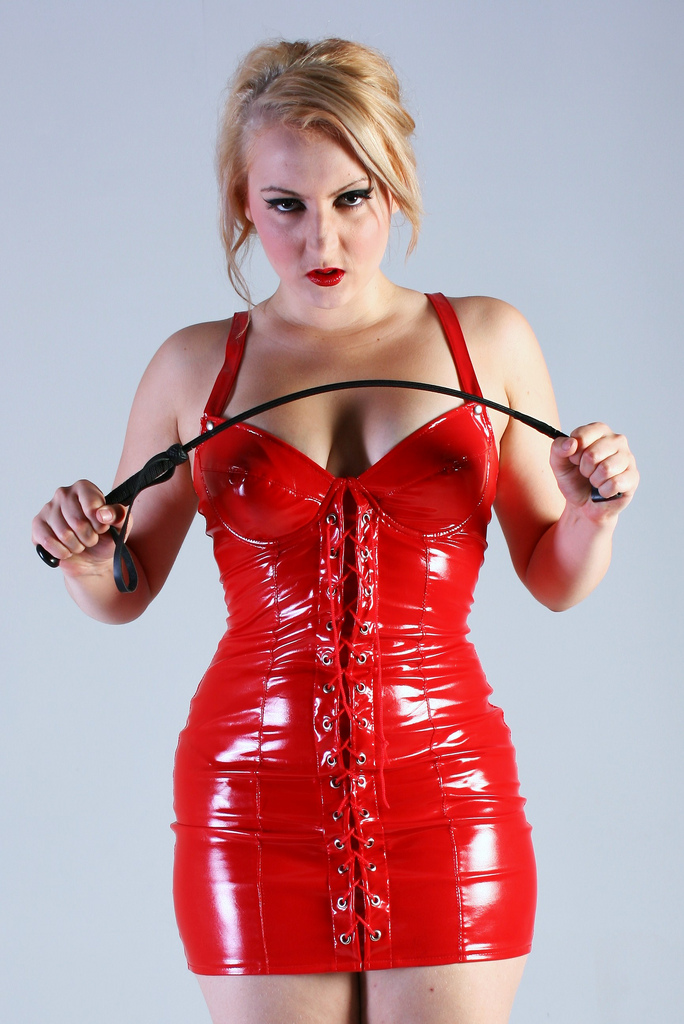
Domitrix Victoria Vendetta with a riding crop.

==== Professional services ====
A professional dominatrix or professional dominant, often referred to within the culture as a pro-dom(me), offers services encompassing the range of bondage, discipline, and dominance in exchange for money. The term dominatrix is little-used within the non-professional BDSM scene. A non-professional dominant woman is more commonly referred to simply as a domme, dominant, or femdom (short for female dominance). Professional submissives ("pro-subs"), although far more rare, do exist.

=== Scenes ===
In BDSM, a "scene" is the stage or setting where BDSM activity takes place, as well as the activity itself. The physical place where a BDSM activity takes place is usually called a dungeon, though some prefer less dramatic terms, including playspace or club. A BDSM activity can, but need not, involve sexual activity or sexual roleplay. A characteristic of many BDSM relationships is the power exchange from the bottom to the dominant partner, and bondage features prominently in BDSM scenes and sexual roleplay.

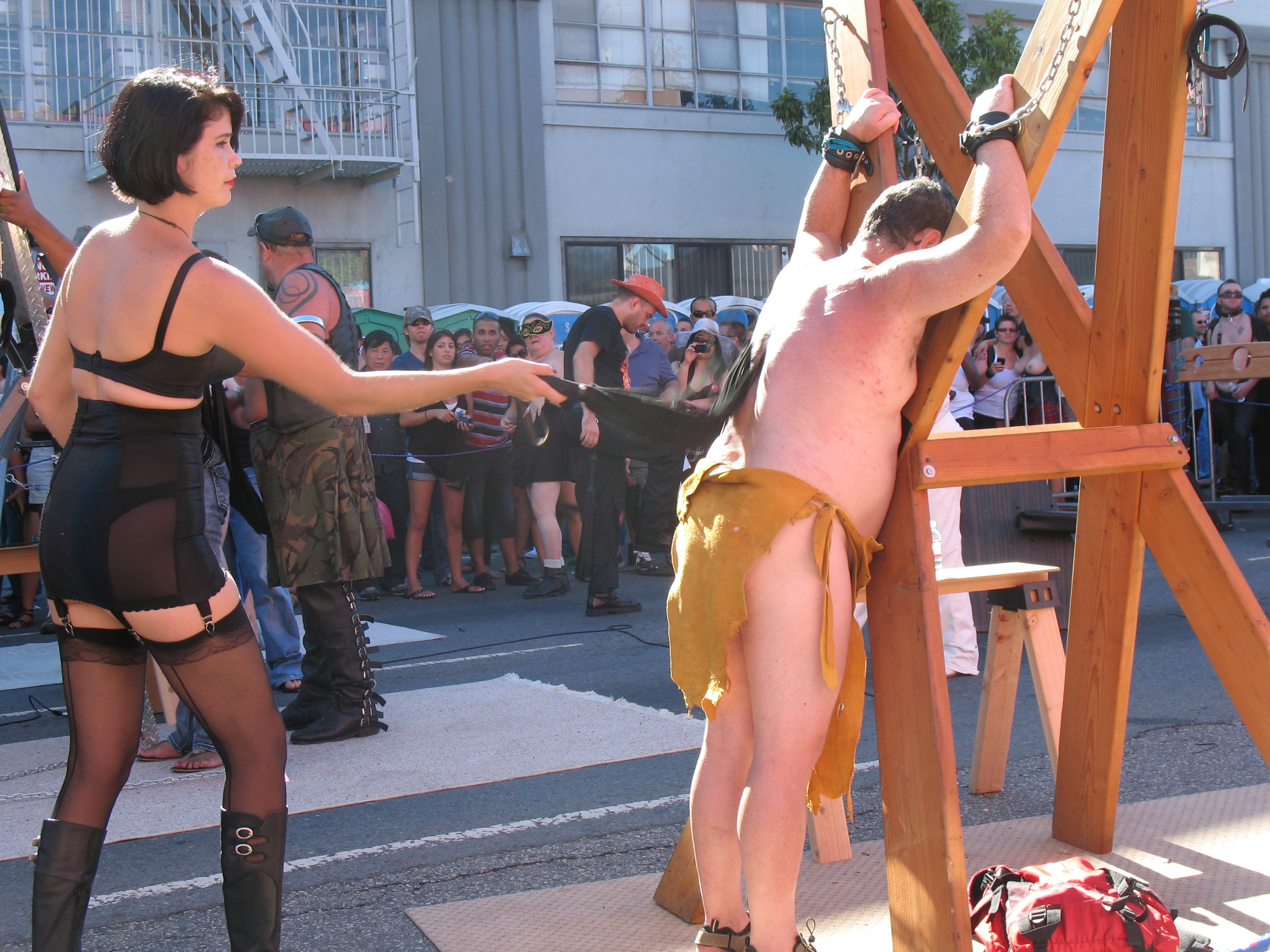
A BDSM scene involving female dominance and male submission, 2010.

"The Scene" (including use of the definite article the) is also used in the BDSM community to refer to the BDSM community as a whole. Thus someone who is on "the Scene", and prepared to play in public, might take part in "a scene" at a public play party.

A scene can take place in private between two or more people and can involve a domestic arrangement, such as servitude or a casual or committed lifestyle master/slave relationship. BDSM elements may involve settings of slave training or punishment for breaches of instructions.

A scene can also take place in a club, where the play can be viewed by others. When a scene takes place in a public setting, it may be because the participants enjoy being watched by others, or because of the equipment available, or because having third parties present adds safety for play partners who have only recently met.

=== Etiquette ===
Most standard social etiquette rules still apply when at a BDSM event, such as not intimately touching someone you do not know, not touching someone else's belongings (including toys), and abiding by dress codes. Many events open to the public also have rules addressing alcohol consumption, recreational drugs, cell phones, and photography.

A specific scene takes place within the general conventions and etiquette of BDSM, such as requirements for mutual consent and agreement as to the limits of any BDSM activity. This agreement can be incorporated into a formal contract. In addition, most clubs have additional rules which regulate how onlookers may interact with the actual participants in a scene. As is common in BDSM, these are founded on the catchphrase "safe, sane, and consensual".

=== Parties and clubs ===
BDSM play parties are events in which BDSM practitioners and other similarly interested people meet in order to communicate, share experiences and knowledge, and to "play" in an erotic atmosphere. BDSM parties show similarities to ones in the dark culture, being based on a more or less strictly enforced dress code; often clothing made of latex, leather or vinyl/PVC, lycra and so on, emphasizing the body's shape and the primary and secondary sexual characteristics. The requirement for such dress codes differ. While some events have none, others have a policy in order to create a more coherent atmosphere and to prevent outsiders from taking part.

At these parties, BDSM can be publicly performed on a stage, or more privately in separate "dungeons". A reason for the relatively fast spread of this kind of event is the opportunity to use a wide range of "playing equipment", which in most apartments or houses is unavailable. Slings, St. Andrew's crosses (or similar restraining constructs), spanking benches, and punishing supports or cages are often made available. The problem of noise disturbance is also lessened at these events, while in the home setting many BDSM activities can be limited by this factor. In addition, such parties offer both exhibitionists and voyeurs a forum to indulge their inclinations without social criticism. Sexual intercourse is not permitted within most public BDSM play spaces or not often seen in others, because it is not the emphasis of this kind of play. In order to ensure the maximum safety and comfort for the participants, certain standards of behaviour have evolved; these include aspects of courtesy, privacy, respect and safewords. Today BDSM parties are taking place in most of the larger cities in the Western world.

This scene appears particularly on the Internet, in publications, and in meetings such as at fetish clubs (like Torture Garden), SM parties, gatherings called munches, and erotic fairs like Venus Berlin. The annual Folsom Street Fair held in San Francisco is the world's largest BDSM event. It has its roots in the gay leather movement. The weekend-long festivities include a wide range of sadomasochistic erotica in a public clothing optional space between 8th and 13th streets with nightly parties associated with the organization.

There are also conventions such as Living in Leather and Black Rose.

== Psychology ==
The causes of paraphilias in people are unclear, but it is believed to be a mixture of neurological, cultural, and psychodynamic factors. No two or more people with a paraphilia will develop it for the same reasons or be interested in the same qualities of the specific sexual interest.

According to Justin Lehmiller, a large part of BDSM activities in the American populace based on a survey of approximately a thousand participants is primarily due to the phenomenon of the "American id" regarding sexuality, which primarily revolves around feelings of needing to break free of societal expectations that feel overwhelming. He claimed that the most significant factors that influenced the development of atypical sexual fantasies in his study that supported his opinion were that male and female participants who reported more kink interest were more likely to have been born in communities with perceived sexually suppressive cultures and/or had otherwise sympathetic views outside of sex to socially conservative ideologies, religious dogma, and were more likely to have reported sexually and morality focused obsessions. Subjectively, he had also reported that many of his clients felt as if practicing BDSM had "freed them" sexually and from worry about their sexual being. Compared to BDSM roleplay, many masochistic and sadistic fantasies often have "extremists" who take the fantasy to the extreme, such as women who fantasize about legitimately being raped and tortured to severe disability or death compared to milder themes of seduction and the more common variant of rape fantasies as an escape from sexual demands on women which are often featured in dark romance. Lehmiller anecdotally says that these types of fantasies are more congruent with psychopathology, with many sexual aggressors and extreme masochists being more likely to have legitimate trauma or true psychiatric illness and personality disorders. They do not reflect the majority of people who experience an interest in BDSM.

Individuals who are homosexual or bisexual men are more likely to wish to engage in a dominant role in BDSM than heterosexual men and women. Heterosexual individuals who practice BDSM generally reported being in blue-collar work, while homosexual men (the authors did not think there were enough female samples for a statistically accurate reading on female participation) were in high-income office jobs and often valued concepts regarding control and hierarical structures. Homosexual participants preferred painful anal intercourse with either a real penis or a dildo and various outfits such as leather, while heterosexuals primarily preferred verbal humiliation, bondage, and physical forms of pain such as whips on both sides of roleplay. While sexual dysfunction was not a significant issue that was self reported, people in BDSM often reported having trouble finding stereotypically stable romantic and sexual partnerships and generally preferred casual sex and aromantic arrangements. A study in 1994 implied that women into S&M are 50% more likely to have finished some sort of post-secondary degree within their lifetime compared to those with only a secondary diploma.

In Sex Crimes and Paraphilia by Eric W. Hickey, Hickey in his meta-analysis of scholarly literature on S&M points out that many primary sources regarding the study of the etiology of the development of sadomasochistic tendencies often mention that less sadistic and masochistic analogues of domination and submission exist within normative societal contexts, especially roles regarding masculinity and feminine behaviors, professionalism and the idea of "possessing" ones partner during sexual activity, with the idea that people who engage in S&M tend to focus more on the specific power contexts in these interactions. The hypothesis attempts to explain the unusually high-income and sexually liberal lives of people who tend to practice BDSM that contradict the values of their occupations by stating that it may make someone feel as if they are truly in "their place" and that they belong in it. An alternative is that S&M may be a form of splitting and a type of atypical object relations where the sadist and masochist grossly inflate regular types of dominating and submissive forces in institutions, attempting to explain common tropes in BDSM pornography regarding teacher-student relationships or bosses often being dominant against workers.

There is evidence that while BDSM itself can be engaged in for a wide variety of reasons and in varying intensities in a given sexual relationship, there are certain types of psychological factors that are involved in subtypes of specific types of S&M play. For example, while women into a submissive role in somnophilia roleplay were only more likely to also prefer submissive rape roleplay, males who reported having fantasies of active roles in somnophilia on platforms such as Reddit and FetLife were more likely to be necrophiliacs, to have fantasied about committing nonconsensual acts of DFSA and sadistic rape, and that in comparison to the elevated ages and psychosocial normalcy in a large amount of BDSM participants, (Note: See #Prevalence.) started early in adolescence and were primarily focused on the idea of not having to worry about the thoughts and opinions of a sexually attractive person that they wished to have intercourse with, often remarking that they felt as if their sexual fetishes during intercourse would be perceived as shameful had the individual been conscious. While dominant males into consensual BDSM roleplay regarding somnophilia were present, the majority of the dominant participants primarily used roleplay as a way of attempting to sublimate their sexual fantasies into a more legally and morally acceptable format.

An Australian study which attempted to resolve a perceived gap between clinical descriptions of sadism and statistically average manifestations of sadism in humans claimed that there is no concrete evidence that interest in a large amount of BDSM activities is inherently pathological or generally related to traumatic experiences, though the study authors claimed that the results were only indicative of the mean of the 1.8% of BDSM respondents in the general population, with no other information on the participants other than education, marriage status, household population, and age. Australians into BDSM are statistically between the ages of 16-29 and generally engage in a large amount of sexually activities in their free time at much higher rates than the rest of the population, with the most significant result being a nearly 25-fold higher chance of engaging in group sex, a 23-fold higher chance of regularly fisting and a 3-fold increase of reporting more than fifty sexual partners. While those into BDSM did not report sexual dysfunction issues such as erectile dysfunction or anorgasmia at higher or lower rates than the rest of the population, the study authors also claimed that a big limitation and source of bias was that all self-reported virgins were immediately eliminated from the study. Australians into BDSM reported low levels of anxiety and worry and had an odds ratio of 0.33 of worry compared to controls, though they were about 5.65 times more likely to have been detained in a correctional facility in their lifetime, though exactly what the crimes were and if any inter-demographic correlates existed were unknown as those were not recorded.

A Berlin study on 1915 men between the ages of 40-70 showed that of 367 who claimed to have related to a subclinical or clinical description of a paraphilia and consented to further personality and psychometric testing, including sadism or masochism, shows that individuals with paraphilias may be prone to minimization of negative feelings they may experience or may not see sex, romance and social performance in similar ways as the general population, as despite the sadist group have the lowest distress rate (0% reporting distress relating to the paraphilia and in general life, with only participants with pedophilia ranking higher in self distress than the general population), all paraphilias equally had at least a two-fold chance of being single, a 4.4-fold more frequent masturbation rate, and were nearly 11 times more likely to report that they felt like their quality of life was poor or that they felt frail. The authors warned that the study did have limitations, such as that they did not differentiate between those into BDSM and people with undiagnosed sexual sadism disorder, sex offenders, or contents of a fantasy. They cautioned that the psychological pattern seen may be a form of selection bias in sexology studies as impulsive and open-minded participants who may feel more likely to engage in sexually impulsive behaviors would be less likely to shy away from divulging info about their sexuality and that the impulsive group with low neuroticism regarding risk aversion would be more likely to have health issues down the road.

A Swedish study of similar methodology to the Australian study replicated health issues in paraphiliacs, but said that the most predictive traits in regards to all paraphilia were actually hypersexual traits in an individual, with men who scored high on libido traits and frequent masturbation having a OR ratio relative to the general population (those who did not score above the 90th percentile on a hypersexuality questionnaire) between 4.6 and 25.6 for exhibitionism, voyeurism, and S&M, with no particular paraphilia preferred over the other statistically and with high overlap. The usage of novel substances and open-mindedness in regards to risky activities was reported as the most correlated links between them and paraphilic behavior, generally suggesting a sort of "maverick" personality type in regards to sex and life. Female subjects were much more stable, with no particular paraphilia dominating significantly even with hypersexuality.

Some reports suggest that people abused as children may have more BDSM injuries and have difficulty with safe words being recognized as meaning stop the previously consensual behaviour; thus, it is possible that people choosing BDSM as part of their lifestyle, who also were previously abused, may have had more police or hospital reports of injuries. In one study of three online surveys, many transgender adults remarked that BDSM influenced their individual experience of gender.

Joseph Merlino, author and psychiatry adviser to the New York Daily News, said in an interview that a sadomasochistic relationship, as long as it is consensual, is not a psychological problem:

It's a problem only if it is getting that individual into difficulties, if he or she is not happy with it, or it's causing problems in their personal or professional lives. If it's not, I'm not seeing that as a problem. But assuming that it did, what I would wonder about is what is his or her biology that would cause a tendency toward a problem, and dynamically, what were the experiences this individual had that led him or her toward one of the ends of the spectrum.

Some psychologists agree that experiences during early sexual development can have a profound effect on the character of sexuality later in life. Sadomasochistic desires, however, seem to form at a variety of ages. Some individuals report having had them before puberty, while others do not discover them until well into adulthood. According to one study, the majority of male sadomasochists (53%) developed their interest before the age of 15, while the majority of females (78%) developed their interest afterward (Breslow, Evans, and Langley 1985). The prevalence of sadomasochism within the general population is unknown. Despite female sadists being less visible than males, some surveys have resulted in comparable amounts of sadistic fantasies between females and males. The results of such studies may demonstrate that one's sex does not determine preference for sadism.

Following a phenomenological study of nine individuals involved in sexual masochistic sessions who regarded pain as central to their experience, sexual masochism was described as an addiction-like tendency, with several features resembling that of drug addiction: craving, intoxication, tolerance and withdrawal. It was also demonstrated how the first masochistic experience is placed on a pedestal, with subsequent use aiming at retrieving this lost sensation, much as described in the descriptive literature on addiction.

== Prevalence ==
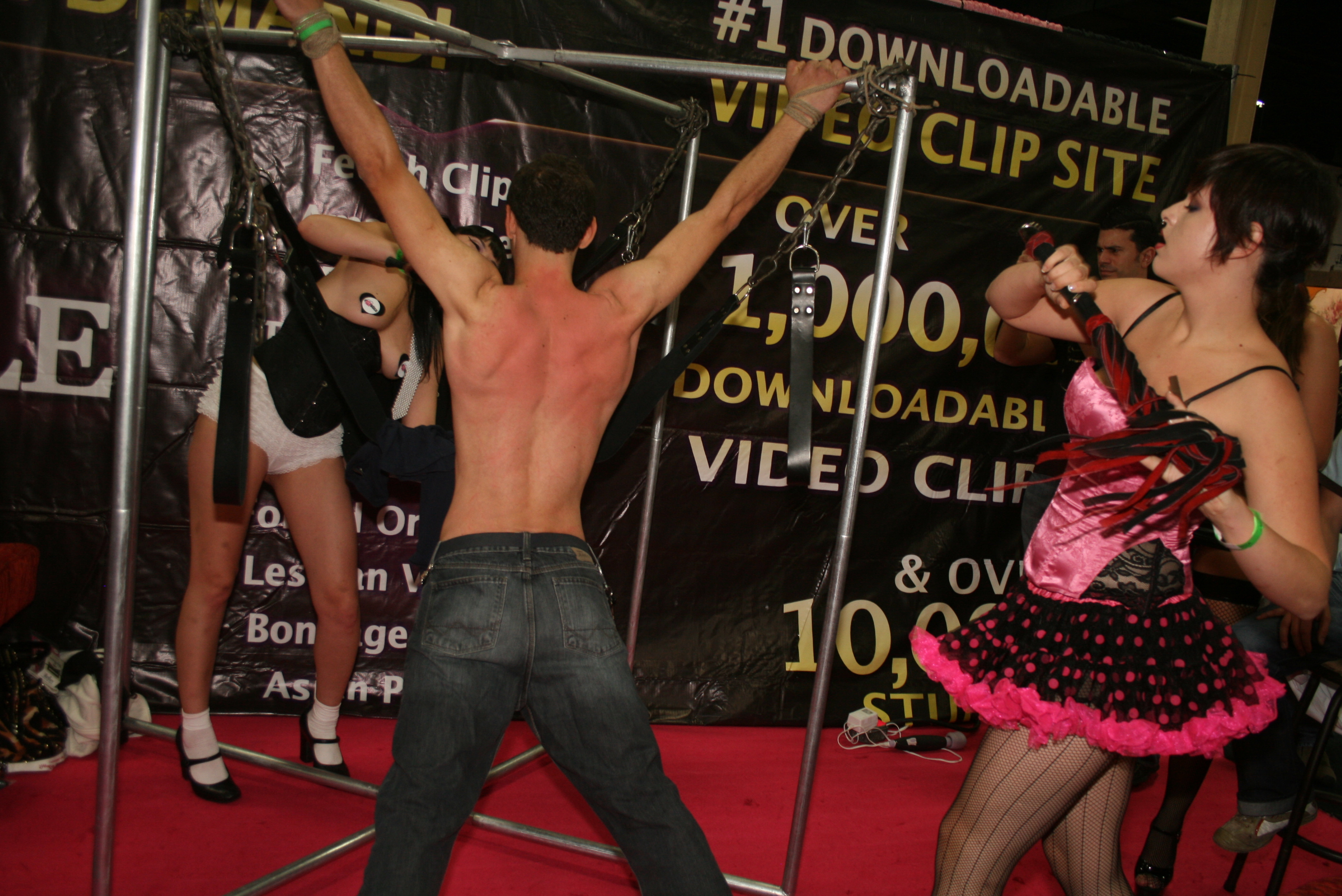
Flogging of a bound man by a dominatrix at the Exxxotica adult event at the Jersey Shore, New Jersey, U.S.

Two professional dominatrices interviewed by David Shankbone about the psychological aspects of some of their stranger requests

BDSM occurs among people of all genders and sexual orientations, and in varied occurrences, practices, and intensities. The spectrum ranges from couples with no connections to the subculture outside of their bedrooms or homes, without any awareness of the concept of BDSM, playing "tie-me-up-games", to public scenes on St. Andrew's crosses at large events such as the Folsom Street Fair in San Francisco. Estimation on the overall percentage of BDSM-related sexual behaviour varies.

Alfred Kinsey stated in his 1953 nonfiction book Sexual Behavior in the Human Female that 12% of females and 22% of males reported having an erotic response to a sadomasochistic story. In that book erotic responses to being bitten were given as:

Erotic responses	By females	By males
Definite and/or frequent	26%	26%
Some response	29%	24%
Never	45%	50%
Number of cases	2200	567

A non-representative survey on the sexual behaviour of American students published in 1997 and based on questionnaires had a response rate of about 8–9%. Its results showed 15% of homosexual and bisexual males, 21% of lesbian and female bisexual students, 11% of heterosexual males and 9% of female heterosexual students committed to BDSM related fantasies. In all groups the level of practical BDSM experiences were around 6%. Within the group of openly lesbian and bisexual females, the quote was significantly higher, at 21%. Independent of their sexual orientation, about 12% of all questioned students, 16% of lesbians and female bisexuals and 8% of heterosexual males articulated an interest in spanking. Experience with this sexual behaviour was indicated by 30% of male heterosexuals, 33% of female bisexuals and lesbians, and 24% of the male gay and bisexual men and female heterosexual women. Even though this study was not considered representative, other surveys indicate similar dimensions in differing target groups.

A representative study done from 2001 to 2002 in Australia found that 1.8% of sexually active people (2.2% men, 1.3% women but no significant sex difference) had engaged in BDSM activity in the previous year. Of the entire sample, 1.8% of men and 1.3% of women had been involved in BDSM. BDSM activity was significantly more likely among bisexuals and homosexuals of both sexes. But among men in general, there was no relationship effect of age, education, language spoken at home or relationship status. Among women, in this study, activity was most common for those between 16 and 19 years of age and least likely for females over 50 years. Activity was also significantly more likely for women who had a regular partner they did not live with, but was not significantly related with speaking a language other than English or education.

Another representative study, published in 1999 by the German Institut für rationale Psychologie, found that about 2/3 of the interviewed women stated a desire to be at the mercy of their sexual partners from time to time. 69% admitted to fantasies dealing with sexual submissiveness, 42% stated interest in explicit BDSM techniques, 25% in bondage. A 1976 study in the general US population suggests three per cent have had positive experiences with Bondage or master-slave roleplaying. Overall 12% of the interviewed females and 18% of the males were willing to try it. A 1990 Kinsey Institute report stated that 5% to 10% of Americans occasionally engage in sexual activities related to BDSM, 11% of men and 17% of women reported trying bondage. Some elements of BDSM have been popularized through increased media coverage since the middle 1990s. Thus both black leather clothing, sexual jewelry such as chains and dominance roleplay appear increasingly outside of BDSM contexts.

According to yet another survey of 317,000 people in 41 countries, about 20% of the surveyed have at least used masks, blindfolds or other bondage utilities once, and 5% explicitly connected themselves with BDSM. In 2004, 19% mentioned spanking as one of their practices and 22% confirmed the use of blindfolds or handcuffs.

A 1985 study found 52 out of 182 female respondents (28%) were involved in sadomasochistic activities.

Recent surveys

A 2009 study on two separate samples of male undergraduate students in Canada found that 62 to 65%, depending on the sample, had entertained sadistic fantasies, and 22 to 39% engaged in sadistic behaviours during sex. The figures were 62 and 52% for bondage fantasies, and 14 to 23% for bondage behaviours. A 2014 study involving a mixed sample of Canadian college students and online volunteers, both male and female, reported that 19% of male samples and 10% of female samples rated the sadistic scenarios described in a questionnaire as being at least "slightly arousing" on a scale that ranged from "very repulsive" to "very arousing"; the difference was statistically significant. The corresponding figures for the masochistic scenarios were 15% for male students and 17% for female students, a non-significant difference. In a 2011 study on 367 middle-aged and elderly men recruited from the broader community in Berlin, 21.8% of the men self-reported sadistic fantasies and 15.5% sadistic behaviors; 24.8% self-reported any such fantasy and/or behavior. The corresponding figures for self-reported masochism were 15.8% for fantasy, 12.3% for behaviour, and 18.5% for fantasy and/or behaviour. In a 2008 study on gay men in Puerto Rico, 14.8% of the over 425 community volunteers reported any sadistic fantasy, desire or behaviour in their lifetime; the corresponding figure for masochism was 15.7%. A 2017 cross-sectional representative survey among the general Belgian population demonstrated a substantial prevalence of BDSM fantasies and activities; 12.5% of the population performed one of more BDSM-practices on a regular basis.

Lifetime BDSM behaviors among North American medical students	Straight men	Gay men	Bisexual men	Straight women	Gay women	Bisexual women
Has been restrained for pleasure	12%	20%	13%	19%	38%	55%
Has restrained someone else for pleasure	17.5%	17%	13%	13%	36%	51%
Has received pain for pleasure	4%	6.5%	18%	8%	10%	36%
Has inflicted pain for pleasure	5%	6%	9%	4%	6.5%	26%

Recent surveys on the spread of BDSM fantasies and practices show strong variations in the range of their results. Researchers believe that 5 to 25 per cent of the population practices sexual behaviour related to pain or dominance and submission. The population with related fantasies is believed to be even larger.

== Medical categorization ==
The current opinions of contemporary psychiatric associations are that S&M fantasies by themselves are not a cause for concern, and that antisocial expressions of the behavior against unconsenting or unable to consent individuals or extreme distress socially, occupationally, or in any situation from behaviors directly brought forth by the sexual urges that impairs quality of life are the only expressions of behavior that may necessitate intervention.

In 1995, Denmark became the first European Union country to have completely removed sadomasochism from its national classification of diseases. This was followed by Sweden in 2009, Norway in 2010, Finland in 2011, and Iceland in 2015.

=== DSM ===
Up until the fourth edition of the Diagnostic and Statistical Manual of Mental Disorders (DSM), a diagnostic manual created by the APA, defined any activities involving the sexual gratification of inflicting or feeling pain as grounds for potential intervention. Following campaigns from advocacy organizations including the National Coalition for Sexual Freedom, as well as academic sources who the group claims to have persuaded in part, the fourth edition attempted to eliminate the diagnosis of a disorder as long as no distress was caused on another person or the own individual apart from social taboos. However, the usage of the term "disorder" had led to various situations in family courts where a parties sexual interests were abused as a reason to gain custody of a child under the provision that the party was mentally ill and used the distress from the complaining party as proof of the secondary criteria, with judges accepting the reasoning due to the prima facie authoritativeness of the DSM, leading to the DSM-5 attempting to correct the issue by differentiating what it meant to have a paraphilia and a paraphilic disorder. The current version of the DSM, DSM-5, does not recognize consensual sadistic or masochistic activity between two adults as being inherently harmful unless it is likely to cause serious disability or death to someone.

=== ICD ===
The World Health Organization's International Classification of Diseases (ICD) has changed in regard to BDSM in recent years.

In Europe, a pro-kink organization known as ReviseF65 (German Wikipedia: de:ReviseF65) campaigned to remove sadomasochism from the ICD.

On 18 June 2018, the WHO (World Health Organization) published the ICD-11, in which sadomasochism, together with fetishism and fetishistic transvestism (cross-dressing for sexual pleasure) are now removed as explicitly listed examples of paraphilias. (Note: It is still possible to diagnose an individual with these conditions under ICD-11 codes 6D35 for nonconsenting individuals or in 63D6 for consensual but potentially dangerous activities.) The proposal which resulted in these changes primarily focused on the lack of practical legal utility in forensic environments, their initial addition being related to misguided conceptions about S&M and fetishism as public safety risks, and the potential for the diagnostic terms to be weaponized politically and legally. Activities related to choking and self-asphyixation were still considered to be pathological in the same report due to the potential possibility of autoerotic deaths or accidental homicide/manslaughter during these activities.

The classifications of sexual disorders reflect contemporary sexual norms and have moved from the idea of inherent psychopathology to anyone with a certain set of sexual believes, to a model that primarily attempts to ignore private sexual matters and focuses primarily on illegal, more self-focused manifestations of sadistic behavior such as rape rather than consensual activity, and those who feel that co-morbid issues or the sexual activities inhibit their ability to live a good quality life (hypersexuality, excessive spending on fetish gear that causes financial issues, disinterest in a partner, etc.)

== Culture ==
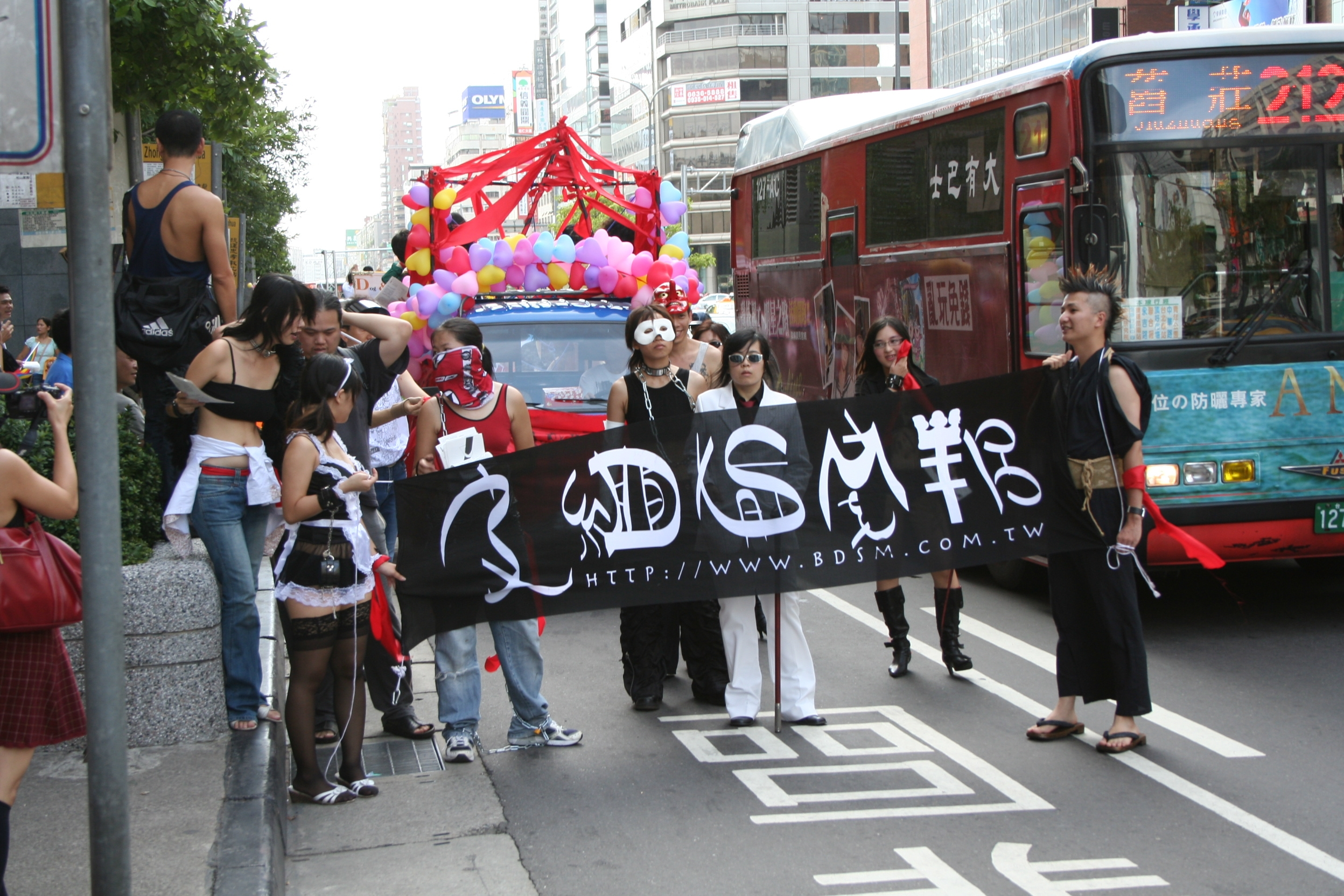
BDSM activists at Taiwan Pride 2005, Taipei

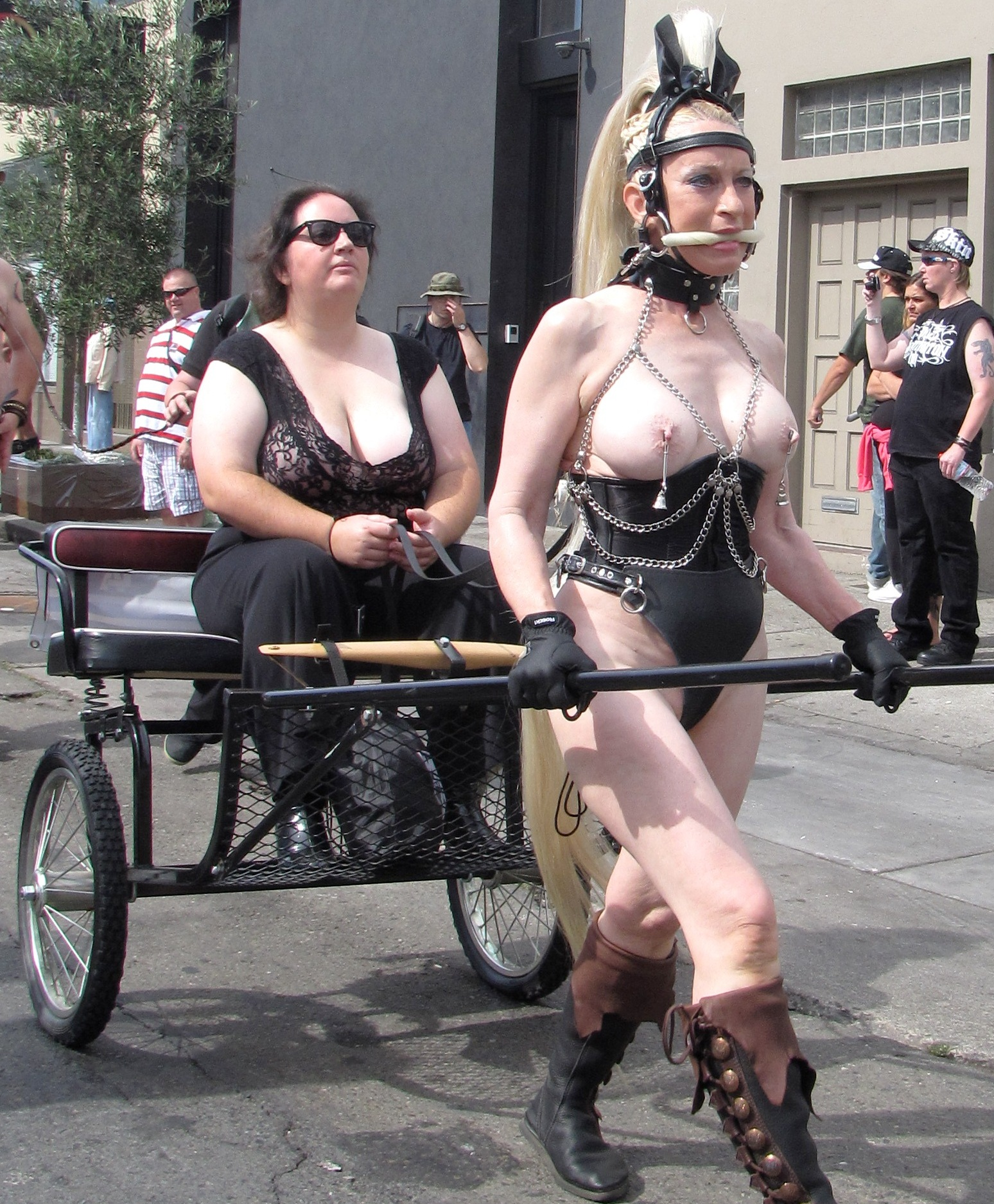
A sulky cart drawn by a pony-girl, an example of petplay at the Folsom Parade, 2012. She is wearing a bit gag and a neck collar, to which are attached a ring of O and a leash. Bells are hung from her pierced nipples. All these symbols indicate she is roleplaying a 'pet slave'.

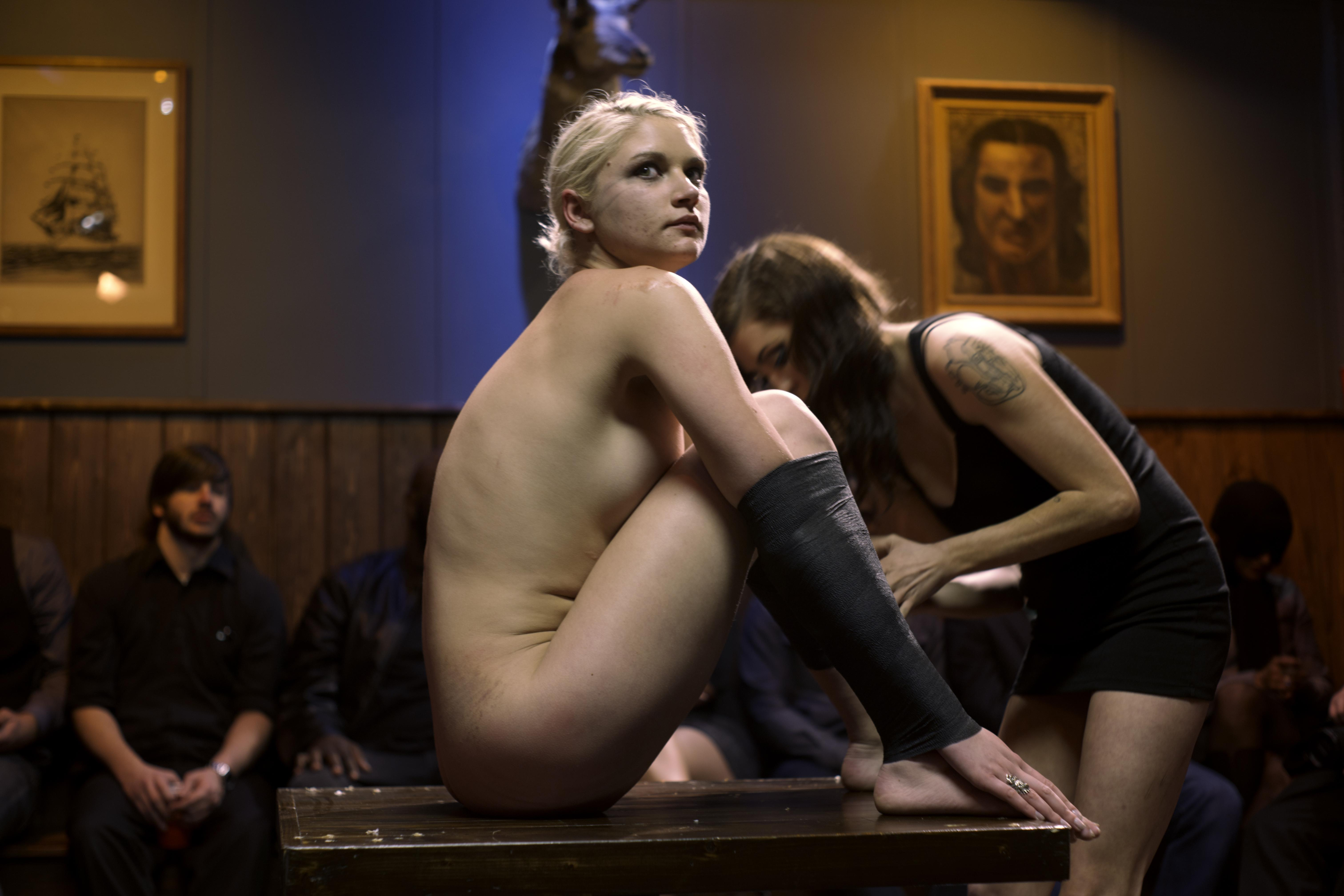
A bondage pornography shoot in the U.S., 2011

Some people who are interested in or curious about BDSM decide to tell others. Depending upon a survey's participants, about 5 to 25 per cent of the US population show affinity to the subject. Other than a few artists and writers, practically no celebrities are publicly known as sadomasochists.

Public knowledge of one's BDSM lifestyle can have detrimental vocational and social effects for sadomasochists. Many face severe professional consequences or social rejection if they are exposed, either voluntarily or involuntarily, as sadomasochists.

Within feminist circles, the discussion is split roughly into two camps: some who see BDSM as an aspect or reflection of oppression (for example, Alice Schwarzer) and, on the other side, pro-BDSM feminists, often grouped under the banner of sex-positive feminism (see Samois); both of them can be traced back to the 1970s. Some feminists have criticized BDSM for eroticizing power and violence and reinforcing misogyny. They argue that women who engage in BDSM are making a choice that is ultimately bad for women. Feminist defenders of BDSM argue that consensual BDSM activities are enjoyed by many women and validate the sexual inclinations of these women. They argue that there is no connection between consensual kinky activities and sex crimes, and that feminists should not attack other women's sexual desires as being "anti-feminist". They also state that the main point of feminism is to give an individual woman free choices in her life; which includes her sexual desire. While some feminists suggest connections between consensual BDSM scenes and non-consensual rape and sexual assault, other sex-positive ones find the notion insulting to women.

Roles are not fixed to gender, but personal preferences. The dominant partner in a heterosexual relationship may be the woman rather than the man, or BDSM may be part of male/male or female/female sexual relationships. Finally, some people switch, taking either a dominant or submissive role on different occasions. Several studies investigating the possibility of a correlation between BDSM pornography and the violence against women also indicate a lack of correlation. In 1991, a lateral survey came to the conclusion that between 1964 and 1984, despite the increase in amount and availability of sadomasochistic pornography in the U.S., Germany, Denmark and Sweden, there is no correlation with the national number of rapes to be found.

Operation Spanner in the U.K. proves that BDSM practitioners still run the risk of being stigmatized as criminals. In 2003, the media coverage of Jack McGeorge showed that simply participating and working in BDSM support groups poses risks to one's job, even in countries where no law restricts it. Here a clear difference can be seen to the situation of homosexuality. The psychological strain appearing in some individual cases is normally neither articulated nor acknowledged in public. Nevertheless, it leads to a difficult psychological situation in which the person concerned can be exposed to high levels of emotional stress.

In the stages of "self-awareness", he or she realizes their desires related to BDSM scenarios or decides to be open for such. Some authors call this internal coming-out. Two separate surveys on this topic independently came to the conclusion that 58 per cent and 67 per cent of the sample respectively, had realized their disposition before their 19th birthday. Other surveys on this topic show comparable results. Independent of age, coming-out can potentially result in a difficult life crisis, sometimes leading to thoughts or acts of suicide. While homosexuals have created support networks in the last decades, sadomasochistic support networks are just starting to develop in most countries. In German-speaking countries they are only moderately more developed. The Internet is the prime contact point for support groups today, allowing for local and international networking. In the U.S., Kink Aware Professionals (KAP) a privately funded, non-profit service provides the community with referrals to psychotherapeutic, medical, and legal professionals who are knowledgeable about and sensitive to the BDSM, fetish, and leather community. In the U.S. and the U.K., the Woodhull Freedom Foundation & Federation, National Coalition for Sexual Freedom (NCSF) and Sexual Freedom Coalition (SFC) have emerged to represent the interests of sadomasochists. The German Bundesvereinigung Sadomasochismus is committed to the same aim of providing information and driving press relations. In 1996, the website and mailing list Datenschlag went online in German and English providing the largest bibliography, as well as one of the most extensive historical collections of sources related to BDSM.

=== Sociological research ===
There have been few studies on the psychological aspects of BDSM using modern scientific standards. Psychotherapist Charles Moser has said there is no evidence for the theory that BDSM has common symptoms or any common psychopathology, emphasizing that there is no evidence that BDSM practitioners have any special psychiatric other problems based on their sexual preferences.

Problems sometimes occur with self-classification. During the phase of the "coming-out", self-questioning related to one's own "normality" is common. According to Moser, the discovery of BDSM preferences can result in fear of the current non-BDSM relationship's destruction. This, combined with the fear of discrimination in everyday life, leads in some cases to a double life which can be highly burdensome. At the same time, the denial of BDSM preferences can induce stress and dissatisfaction with one's own "vanilla"-lifestyle, feeding the apprehension of finding no partner. Moser states that BDSM practitioners having problems finding BDSM partners would probably have problems in finding a non-BDSM partner as well. The wish to remove BDSM preferences is another possible reason for psychological problems since it is not possible in most cases. Finally, the scientist states that BDSM practitioners seldom commit violent crimes. From his point of view, crimes of BDSM practitioners usually have no connection with the BDSM components existing in their life. Moser's study comes to the conclusion that there is no scientific evidence, which could give reason to refuse members of this group work- or safety certificates, adoption possibilities, custody or other social rights or privileges. The Swiss psychoanalyst Fritz Morgenthaler shares a similar perspective in his book, Homosexuality, Heterosexuality, Perversion (1988). He states that possible problems result not necessarily from the non-normative behavior, but in most cases primarily from the real or feared reactions of the social environment towards their own preferences. In 1940 psychoanalyst Theodor Reik reached implicitly the same conclusion in his standard work Aus Leiden Freuden. Masochismus und Gesellschaft.

Moser's results are further supported by a 2008 Australian study by Richters et al. on the demographic and psychosocial features of BDSM participants. The study found that BDSM practitioners were no more likely to have experienced sexual assault than the control group, and were not more likely to feel unhappy or anxious. The BDSM males reported higher levels of psychological well-being than the controls. It was concluded that "BDSM is simply a sexual interest or subculture attractive to a minority, not a pathological symptom of past abuse or difficulty with 'normal' sex."

=== Gender differences in research ===
Several recent studies have been conducted on the gender differences and personality traits of BDSM practitioners. Wismeijer and van Assen (2013) found that "the association of BDSM role and gender was strong and significant" with only 8% of women in the study being dominant compared to 75% being submissive; Hébert and Weaver (2014) found that 9% of women in their study were dominant compared to 88% submissive; Weierstall1 and Giebel (2017) likewise found a significant difference, with 19% of women in the study as dominant compared to 74% as submissive, and a study from Andrea Duarte Silva (2015) indicated that 61.7% of females who are active in BDSM expressed a preference for a submissive role, 25.7% consider themselves a switch, while 12.6% prefer the dominant role. In contrast, 46.6% of men prefer the submissive role, 24% consider themselves to be switches and 29.5% prefer the dominant role. They concluded that "men more often display an engagement in dominant practices, whereas females take on the submissive part. This result is inline with a recent study about mate preferences that has shown that women have a generally higher preference for a dominant partner than men do (Giebel, Moran, Schawohl, & Weierstall, 2015). Women also prefer dominant men, and even men who are aggressive, for a short-term relationship and for the purpose of sexual intercourse (Giebel, Weierstall, Schauer, & Elbert, 2013)". Similarly, studies on sexual fantasy differences between men and women show the latter prefer submissive and passive fantasies over dominant and active ones, with rape and force being common.

==== Gender differences in masochistic scripts ====
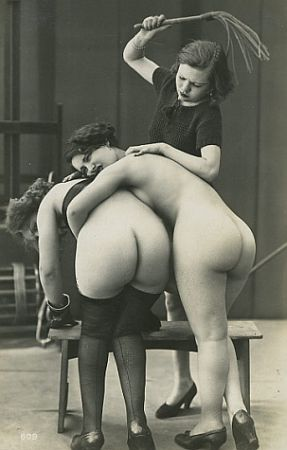
A whipping scene where both dominant and submissives are female, Paris, 1930

One common belief of BDSM and kink is that women are more likely to take on masochistic roles than men. Roy Baumeister (2010) had more male masochists in his study than female, and fewer male dominants than female. The lack of statistical significance in these gender differences suggests that no assumptions should be made regarding gender and masochistic roles in BDSM. One explanation why we might think otherwise lies in our social and cultural ideals about femininity; masochism may emphasize certain stereotypically feminine elements through activities like feminization of men and ultra-feminine clothing for women. But such tendencies of the submissive masochistic role should not be interpreted as a connection between it and the stereotypical female role—many masochistic scripts do not include any of these tendencies.

Baumeister found that masochistic males experienced greater: severity of pain, frequency of humiliation (status-loss, degrading, oral), partner infidelity, active participation by other persons, and cross-dressing. Trends also suggested that male masochism included more bondage and oral sex than female (though the data was not significant). Female masochists, on the other hand, experienced greater: frequency in pain, pain as punishment for 'misdeeds' in the relationship context, display humiliation, genital intercourse, and presence of non-participating audiences. The exclusiveness of dominant males in a heterosexual relationship happens because, historically, men in power preferred multiple partners. Finally, Baumeister observes a contrast between the 'intense sensation' focus of male masochism to a more 'meaning and emotion' centred female masochistic script.

Prior argues that although some of these women may appear to be engaging in traditional subordinate or submissive roles, BDSM allows women in both dominant and submissive roles to express and experience personal power through their sexual identities. In a study that she conducted in 2013, she found that the majority of the women she interviewed identified as bottom, submissive, captive, or slave/sex slave. In turn, Prior was able to answer whether or not these women found an incongruity between their sexual identities and feminist identity. Her research found that these women saw little to no incongruity, and in fact felt that their feminist identity supported identities of submissive and slave. For them, these are sexually and emotionally fulfilling roles and identities that, in some cases, feed other aspects of their lives. Prior contends that third wave feminism provides a space for women in BDSM communities to express their sexual identities fully, even when those identities seem counter-intuitive to the ideals of feminism. Furthermore, women who do identify as submissive, sexually or otherwise, find a space within BDSM where they can fully express themselves as integrated, well-balanced, and powerful women.

==== Women in S/M culture ====
Levitt, Moser, and Jamison's 1994 study provides a general, if outdated, description of characteristics of women in the sadomasochistic (S/M) subculture. They state that women in S/M tend to have higher education, become more aware of their desires as young adults, are less likely to be married than the general population. The researchers found the majority of females identified as heterosexual and submissive, a substantial minority were versatile—able to switch between dominant and submissive roles—and a smaller minority identified with the dominant role exclusively. Oral sex, bondage and master-slave script were among the most popular activities, while feces/watersports were the least popular.

=== Orientation observances in research ===
BDSM is considered by some of its practitioners to be a sexual orientation. The BDSM and kink scene is more often seen as a diverse pansexual community. Often this is a non-judgmental community where gender, sexuality, orientation, preferences are accepted as is or worked at to become something a person can be happy with. In research, studies have focused on bisexuality and its parallels with BDSM, as well as gay-straight differences between practitioners.

==== Asexuality ====
It has been suggested that some asexual people have found a language for navigating relationships through BDSM.

==== Bisexuality ====
In Steve Lenius' original 2001 paper, he explored the acceptance of bisexuality in a supposedly pansexual BDSM community. The reasoning behind this is that 'coming-out' had become primarily the territory of the gay and lesbian, with bisexuals feeling the push to be one or the other (and being right only half the time either way). What he found in 2001, was that people in BDSM were open to discussion about the topic of bisexuality and pansexuality and all controversies they bring to the table, but personal biases and issues stood in the way of actively using such labels. A decade later, Lenius (2011) looks back on his study and considers if anything has changed. He concluded that the standing of bisexuals in the BDSM and kink community was unchanged, and believed that positive shifts in attitude were moderated by society's changing views towards different sexualities and orientations. But Lenius (2011) does emphasize that the pansexual promoting BDSM community helped advance greater acceptance of alternative sexualities.

Brandy Lin Simula (2012), on the other hand, argues that BDSM actively resists gender-conforming and identified three different types of BDSM bisexuality: gender-switching, gender-based styles (taking on a different gendered style depending on the gender of partner when playing), and rejection of gender (resisting the idea that gender matters in their play partners). Simula (2012) explains that practitioners of BDSM routinely challenge our concepts of sexuality by pushing the limits on pre-existing ideas of sexual orientation and gender norms. For some, BDSM and kink provides a platform in creating identities that are fluid, ever-changing.

==== Comparison between gay and straight men in S/M ====
Demographically, Nordling et al.'s (2006) study found no differences in age, but 43% of gay male respondents compared to 29% of straight males had university-level education. The gay men also had higher incomes than the general population and tended to work in white-collar jobs while straight men tended toward blue-collar ones. Because there were not enough female respondents (22), no conclusions could be drawn from them.

Sexually speaking, the same 2006 study by Nordling et al. found that gay males were aware of their S/M preferences and took part in them at an earlier age, preferring leather, anal sex, rimming, dildos and special equipment or uniform scenes. In contrast, straight men preferred verbal humiliation, mask and blindfolds, gags, rubber/latex outfits, caning, vaginal sex, straitjackets, and cross-dressing among other activities. From the questionnaire, researchers were able to identify four separate sexual themes: hyper-masculinity, giving and receiving pain, physical restriction (i.e. bondage), and psychological humiliation. Gay men preferred activities that tended towards hyper-masculinity while straight men showed greater preference for humiliation, significantly higher master/madame-slave role play at ≈84%. Though there were not enough female respondents to draw a similar conclusion with, the fact that there is a difference in gay and straight men suggests strongly that S/M (and BDSM in general) can not be considered a homogenous phenomenon. As Nordling et al. (2006) puts it, "People who identify as sadomasochists mean different things by these identifications." (54)

=== History of psychotherapy and current recommendations ===
Psychiatry has an insensitive history in the area of BDSM. There have been many involvements by institutions of political power to marginalize subgroups and sexual minorities. Mental health professionals have a long history of holding negative assumptions and stereotypes about the BDSM community. Beginning with the DSM-II, Sexual Sadism and Sexual Masochism were listed as sexually deviant behaviours. Sadism and masochism were also found in the personality disorder section. This negative assumption has not changed significantly which is evident in the continued inclusion of Sexual Sadism and Sexual Masochism as paraphilias in the DSM-IV-TR. The DSM-V, however, has depathologized the language around paraphilias in a way that signifies "the APA’s intent to not demand treatment for healthy consenting adult sexual expression". Still, biases and misinformation can result in pathologizing and unintentional harm to clients who identify as sadists and/or masochists and medical professionals who have been trained under older editions of the DSM can be slow to change in their ways of clinical practice.

According to Kolmes et al. (2006), major themes of biased and inadequate care to BDSM clients are:

- Considering BDSM to be unhealthy
- Requiring a client to give up BDSM activities in order to continue in treatment
- Confusing BDSM with abuse
- Having to educate the therapist about BDSM
- Assuming that BDSM interests are indicative of past family/spousal abuse
- Therapists misrepresenting their expertise by stating that they are BDSM-positive when they lack knowledge of BDSM practices

These same researchers suggested that therapists should be open to learning more about BDSM, to show comfort in talking about BDSM issues, and to understand and promote "safe, sane, consensual" BDSM.

There has also been research which suggests BDSM can be a beneficial way for victims of sexual assault to deal with their trauma, most notably by Corie Hammers, but this work is limited in scope and, to date, has not undergone empirical testing as a treatment.

=== Clinical issues ===
Nichols (2006) compiled some common clinical issues: countertransference, non-disclosure, coming out, partner/families, and bleed-through.

Countertransference is a common problem in clinical settings. Despite having no evidence, therapists may find themselves believing that their client's pathology is "self-evident". Therapists may feel intense disgust and aversive reactions. Feelings of countertransference can interfere with therapy. Another common problem is when clients conceal their sexual preferences from their therapists. This can compromise any therapy. To avoid non-disclosure, therapists are encouraged to communicate their openness in indirect ways with literature and artworks in the waiting room. Therapists can also deliberately bring up BDSM topics during the course of therapy. With less informed therapists, sometimes they over-focus on clients' sexuality which detracts from original issues such as family relationships, depression, etc. A special subgroup that needs counselling is the "newbie". Individuals just coming out might have internalized shame, fear, and self-hatred about their sexual preferences. Therapists need to provide acceptance, care, and model positive attitude; providing reassurance, psychoeducation, and bibliotherapy for these clients is crucial. The average age when BDSM individuals realize their sexual preference is around 26 years. Many people hide their sexuality until they can no longer contain their desires. However, they may have married or had children by this point.

== History ==
=== Origins ===
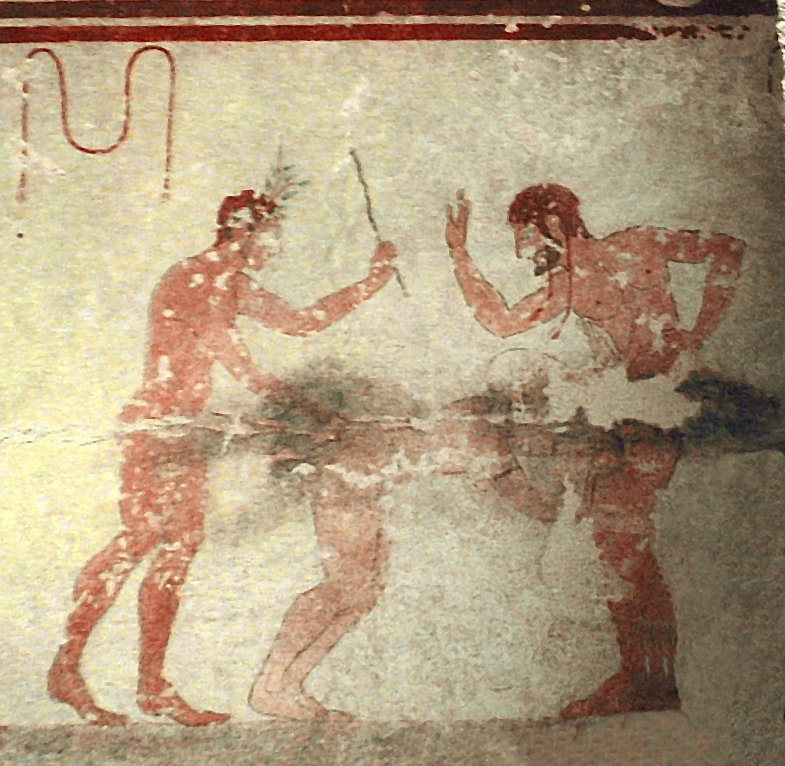
A fresco in the Etruscan Tomb of the Whipping, 5th century BC

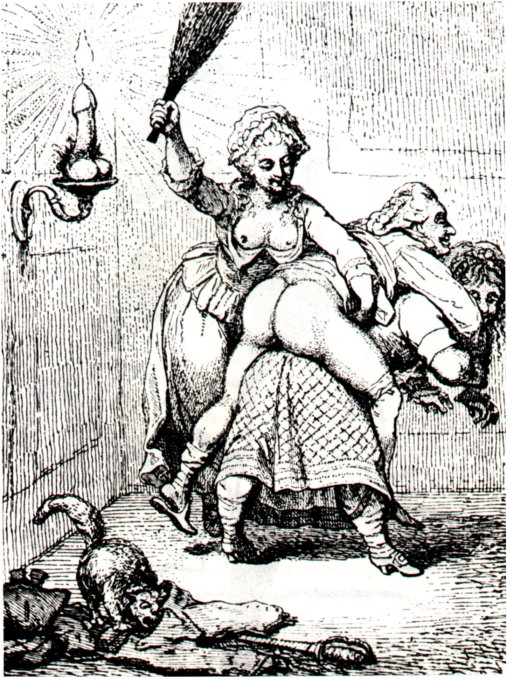
Copper engraving, about 1780

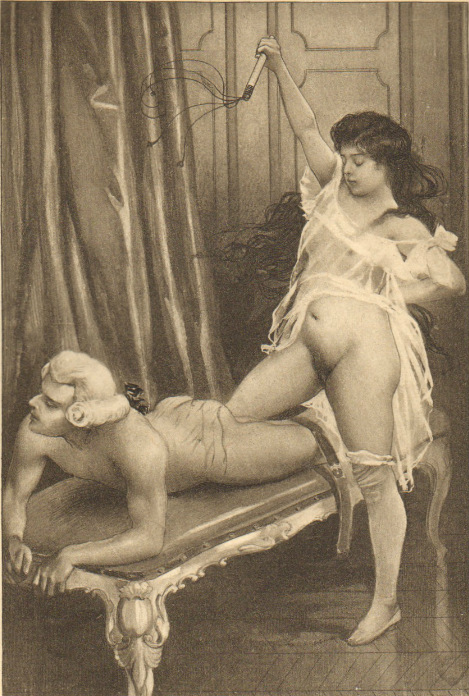
Flagellation scene, illustration to Fanny Hill by Édouard-Henri Avril, 1907

Practices of BDSM survive from some of the oldest textual records in the world, associated with rituals to the goddess Inanna (Ishtar in Akkadian). Cuneiform texts dedicated to Inanna which incorporate domination rituals. In particular, she points to ancient writings such as Inanna and Ebih (in which the goddess dominates Ebih), and Hymn to Inanna describing cross-dressing transformations and rituals "imbued with pain and ecstasy, bringing about initiation and journeys of altered states of consciousness; punishment, moaning, ecstasy, lament and song, participants exhausting themselves in weeping and grief."

During the 9th century BC, ritual flagellations were performed in Artemis Orthia, one of the most important religious areas of ancient Sparta, where the Cult of Orthia, a pre-Olympic religion, was practiced. Here, ritual flagellation called diamastigosis took place, in which young adolescent men were whipped in a ceremony overseen by the priestess. These are referred to by a number of ancient authors, including Pausanius (III, 16: 10–11).

One of the oldest graphical proofs of sadomasochistic activities is found in the Etruscan Tomb of the Whipping near Tarquinia, which dates to the 5th century BC. Inside the tomb, there is a fresco which portrays two men who flagellate a woman with a cane and a hand during an erotic situation. Another reference related to flagellation is to be found in the sixth book of the Satires of the ancient Roman Poet Juvenal (1st–2nd century A.D.), further reference can be found in Petronius's Satyricon where a delinquent is whipped for sexual arousal. Anecdotal narratives related to humans who have had themselves voluntary bound, flagellated or whipped as a substitute for sex or as part of foreplay reach back to the 3rd and 4th century BC.

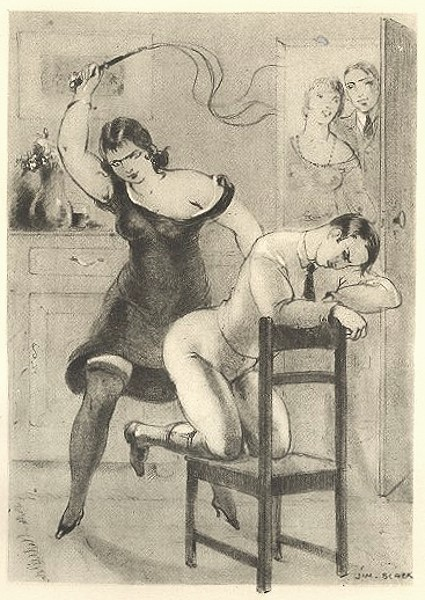
A woman flogging a man wearing stockings and heels, as a couple observe, from Dresseuses d'Hommes (1931)

In Pompeii, a whip-mistress figure with wings is depicted on the wall of the Villa of Mysteries, as part of an initiation of a young woman into the Mysteries. The whip-mistress role drove the sacred initiation of ceremonial death and rebirth. The archaic Greek Aphrodite may too once have been armed with an implement, with archaeological evidence of armed Aphrodites known from a number of locations in Cythera, Acrocorinth and Sparta, and which may have been a whip.

The Kama Sutra of India describes four different kinds of hitting during sex, the allowed regions of the human body to target and different kinds of joyful "cries of pain" practiced by bottoms. The collection of historic texts related to sensuous experiences explicitly emphasizes that impact play, biting and pinching during sexual activities should only be performed consensually since only some women consider such behavior to be joyful. From this perspective, the Kama Sutra can be considered one of the first written resources dealing with sadomasochistic activities and safety rules. Further texts with sadomasochistic connotation appear worldwide during the following centuries on a regular basis.

There are anecdotal reports of people willingly being bound or whipped, as a prelude to or substitute for sex, during the 14th century. The medieval phenomenon of courtly love in all of its slavish devotion and ambivalence has been suggested by some writers to be a precursor of BDSM. Some sources claim that BDSM as a distinct form of sexual behavior originated at the beginning of the 18th century when Western civilization began medically and legally categorizing sexual behavior (see Etymology).

Flagellation practiced within an erotic setting has been recorded from at least the 1590s evidenced by a John Davies epigram, and references to "flogging schools" in Thomas Shadwell's The Virtuoso (1676) and Tim Tell-Troth's Knavery of Astrology (1680). Visual evidence such as mezzotints and print media is also identified revealing scenes of flagellation, such as "The Cully Flaug'd" from the British Museum collection.

John Cleland's novel Fanny Hill, published in 1749, incorporates a flagellation scene between the character's protagonist Fanny Hill and Mr Barville. A large number of flagellation publications followed, including Fashionable Lectures: Composed and Delivered with Birch Discipline (c. 1761), promoting the names of women offering the service in a lecture room with rods and cat o' nine tails.

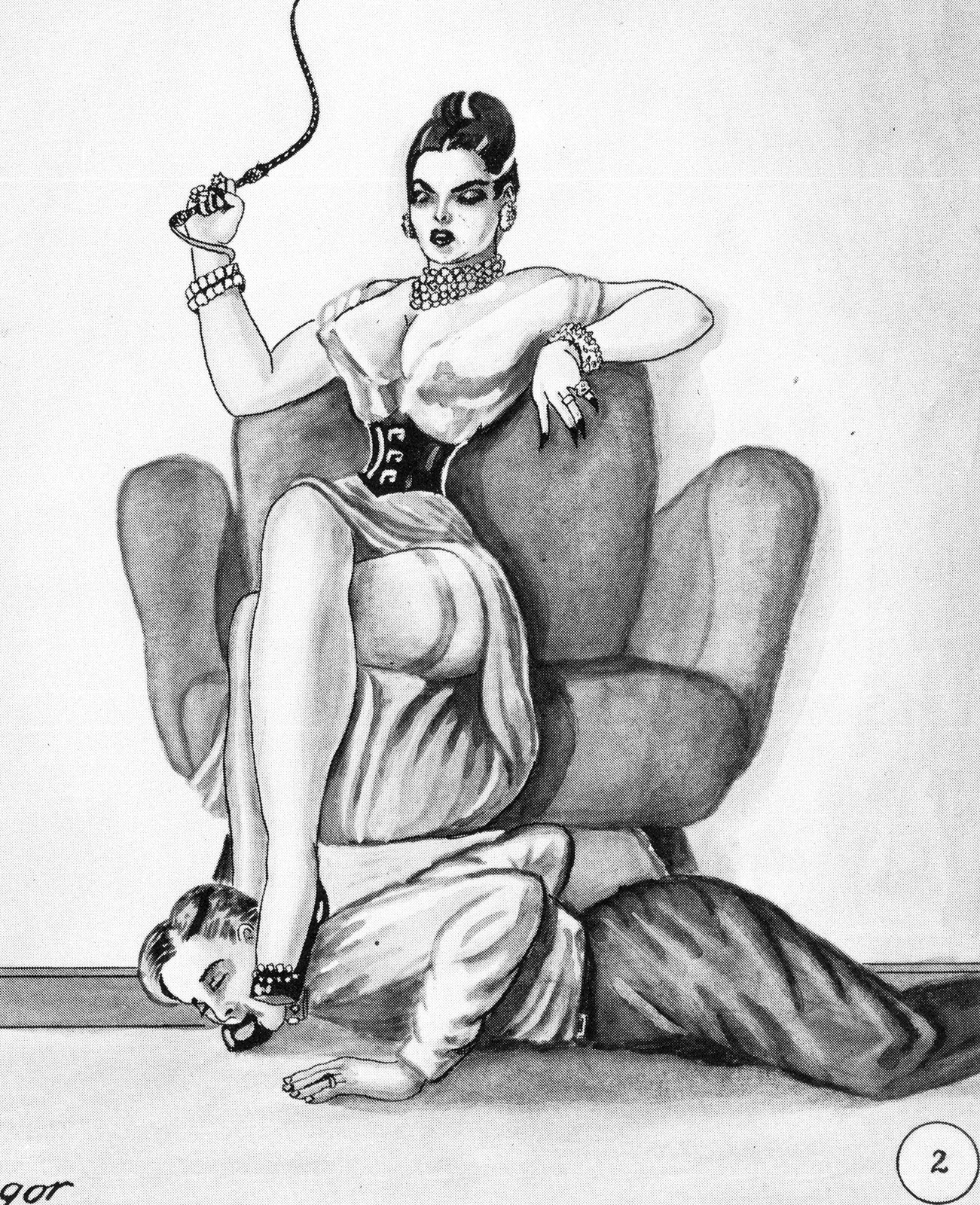
Foot worship of one of the feet of a dominatrix by a submissive man. Her other foot rests over the man's head, using it as a footstool (human furniture). This sketch is from a 1950 work named Bizarre Honeymoon.

Other sources give a broader definition, citing BDSM-like behavior in earlier times and other cultures, such as the medieval flagellates and the physical ordeal rituals of some Native American societies.

BDSM ideas and imagery have existed on the fringes of Western culture throughout the 20th century. Robert Bienvenu attributes the origins of modern BDSM to three sources, which he names as "European Fetish" (from 1928), "American Fetish" (from 1934), and "Gay Leather" (from 1950). Another source are the sexual games played in brothels, which go back to the 19th century, if not earlier. Charles Guyette was the first American to produce and distribute fetish related material (costumes, footwear, photography, props and accessories) in the U.S. His successor, Irving Klaw, produced commercial sexploitation film and photography with a BDSM theme (most notably with Bettie Page) and issued fetish comics (known then as "chapter serials") by the now-iconic artists John Willie, Gene Bilbrew, and Eric Stanton.

Stanton's model Bettie Page became at the same time one of the first successful models in the area of fetish photography and one of the most famous pin-up girls of American mainstream culture. Italian author and designer Guido Crepax was deeply influenced by him, coining the style and development of European adult comics in the second half of the 20th century. The artists Helmut Newton and Robert Mapplethorpe are the most prominent examples of the increasing use of BDSM-related motives in modern photography and the public discussions still resulting from this.

Alfred Binet first coined the term erotic fetishism in his 1887 book, Du fétichisme dans l'amour Richard von Krafft-Ebing saw BDSM interests as the end of a continuum.

=== Leather movement ===
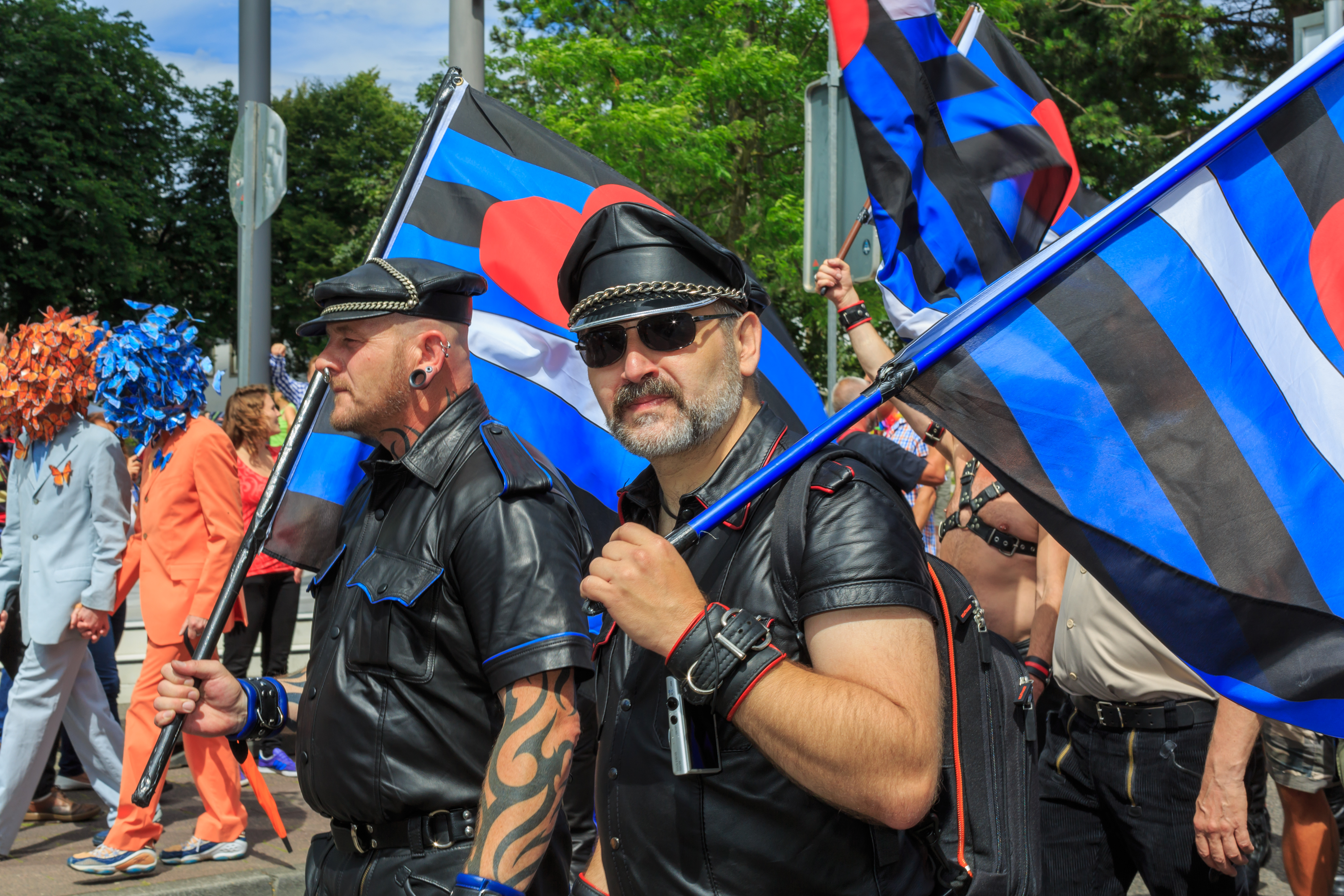
Leathermen participating in the Cologne Pride Parade, 2014

Leather has been a predominantly gay male term to refer to one fetish, but it can stand for many more. Members of the gay male leather community may wear leathers such as motorcycle leathers, or may be attracted to men wearing leather. Leather and BDSM are seen as two parts of one whole. Much of the BDSM culture can be traced back to the gay male leather culture, which formalized itself out of the group of men who were soldiers returning home after World War II (1939–1945). World War II was the setting where countless homosexual men and women tasted the life among homosexual peers. Post-war, homosexual individuals congregated in larger cities such as New York, Chicago, San Francisco, and Los Angeles. They formed leather clubs and bike clubs; some were fraternal services. The establishment of Mr. Leather Contest and Mr. Drummer Contest were made around this time. This was the genesis of the gay male leather community. Many of the members were attracted to extreme forms of sexuality, for which peak expression was in the pre-AIDS 1970s. This subculture is epitomized by the Leatherman's Handbook by Larry Townsend, published in 1972, which describes in detail the practices and culture of gay male sadomasochists in the late 1960s and early 1970s. In the early 1980s, lesbians also joined the leathermen as a recognizable element of the gay leather community. They also formed leather clubs, but there were some gender differences, such as the absence of leatherwomen's bars. In 1981, the publication of Coming to Power by lesbian-feminist group Samois led to a greater knowledge and acceptance of BDSM in the lesbian community. By the 1990s, the gay men's and women's leather communities were no longer underground and played an important role in the kink community.

Today, the leather movement is generally seen as a part of the BDSM-culture instead of as a development deriving from gay subculture, even if a huge part of the BDSM-subculture was gay in the past. In the 1990s, the so-called New Guard leather subculture evolved. This new orientation started to integrate psychological aspects into their play.

The Leather Archives and Museum (LA&M) in Chicago was founded in 1991 by Chuck Renslow and Tony DeBlase as a “community archives, library, and museum of leather, kink, fetish, and BDSM history and culture.” The LA&M has an extensive collection of leather- and BDSM-related artifacts, including one of three original leather pride flags.

The San Francisco South of Market Leather History Alley consists of four works of art along Ringold Alley honoring leather culture; it opened in 2017. One of the works of art is metal bootprints along the curb which honor 28 people (including Steve McEachern, owner of the Catacombs, a gay and lesbian S/M fisting club, and Cynthia Slater, a founder of the Society of Janus, the second oldest BDSM organization in the United States) who were an important part of the leather communities of San Francisco.

=== Internet ===
In the late 1980s, the Internet provided a way of finding people with specialized interests around the world as well as on a local level, and communicating with them anonymously. This brought about an explosion of interest and knowledge of BDSM, particularly on the usenet group alt.sex.bondage. When that group became too cluttered with spam, the focus moved to soc.subculture.bondage-bdsm. With an increased focus on forms of social media, FetLife was formed, which advertises itself as "a social network for the BDSM and fetish community". It operates similarly to other social media sites, with the ability to make friends with other users, events, and pages of shared interests.

In addition to traditional sex shops, which sell sex paraphernalia, there has also been an explosive growth of online adult toy companies that specialize in leather/latex gear and BDSM toys. Once a very niche market, there are now very few sex toy companies that do not offer some sort of BDSM or fetish gear in their catalog. Kinky elements seem to have worked their way into "vanilla" markets. The former niche expanded to an important pillar of the business with adult accessories. Today practically all suppliers of sex toys do offer items which originally found usage in the BDSM subculture. Padded handcuffs, latex and leather garments, as well as more exotic items like soft whips for fondling and TENS for erotic electro stimulation, can be found in catalogs aiming at classical vanilla target groups, indicating that former boundaries increasingly seem to shift.

During the last years, the Internet also provides a central platform for networking among individuals who are interested in the subject. Besides countless private and commercial choices, there is an increasing number of local networks and support groups emerging. These groups often offer comprehensive background and health-related information for people who have been unwillingly outed as well as contact lists with information on psychologists, physicians and lawyers who are familiar with BDSM-related topics.

== Legal status ==
=== Austria ===
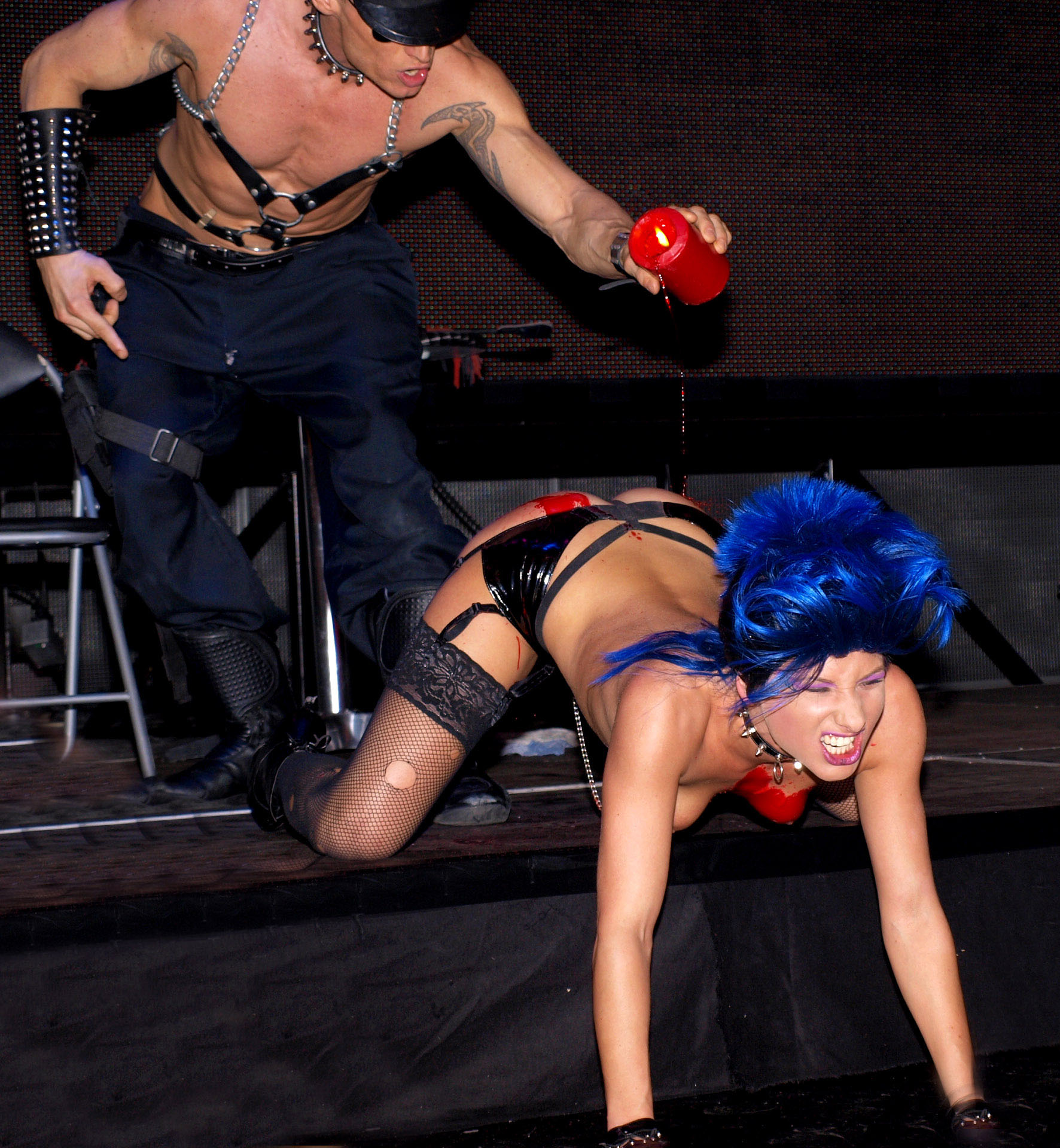
Consensual giving or receiving of pain is legal in Austria, showing wax play at the Eros Pyramide sex show in 2009

Section 90 of the Austrian criminal code declares bodily injury (Sections 83–84) or the endangerment of physical security (Section 89) to not be subject to penalty in cases in which the victim has consented and the injury or endangerment does not offend moral sensibilities. Case law from the Austrian Supreme Court has consistently shown that bodily injury is only offensive to moral sensibilities, thus it is only punishable when a "serious injury" (damage to health or an employment disability lasting more than 24 days) or the death of the "victim" results. A light injury is generally considered permissible when the "victim" has consented to it. In cases of threats to bodily well-being, the standard depends on the probability that an injury will occur. If serious injury or even death would be a likely result of a threat being carried out, then even the threat itself is considered punishable.

=== Canada ===
In 2004, a judge in Canada ruled that videos seized by the police featuring BDSM activities were not obscene and did not constitute violence, but a "normal and acceptable" sexual activity between two consenting adults.

In 2011, the Supreme Court of Canada ruled in R. v. J.A. that a person must have an active mind during the specific sexual activity in order to legally consent. The Court ruled that it is a criminal offence to perform a sexual act on an unconscious person—whether or not that person consented in advance.

=== Germany ===
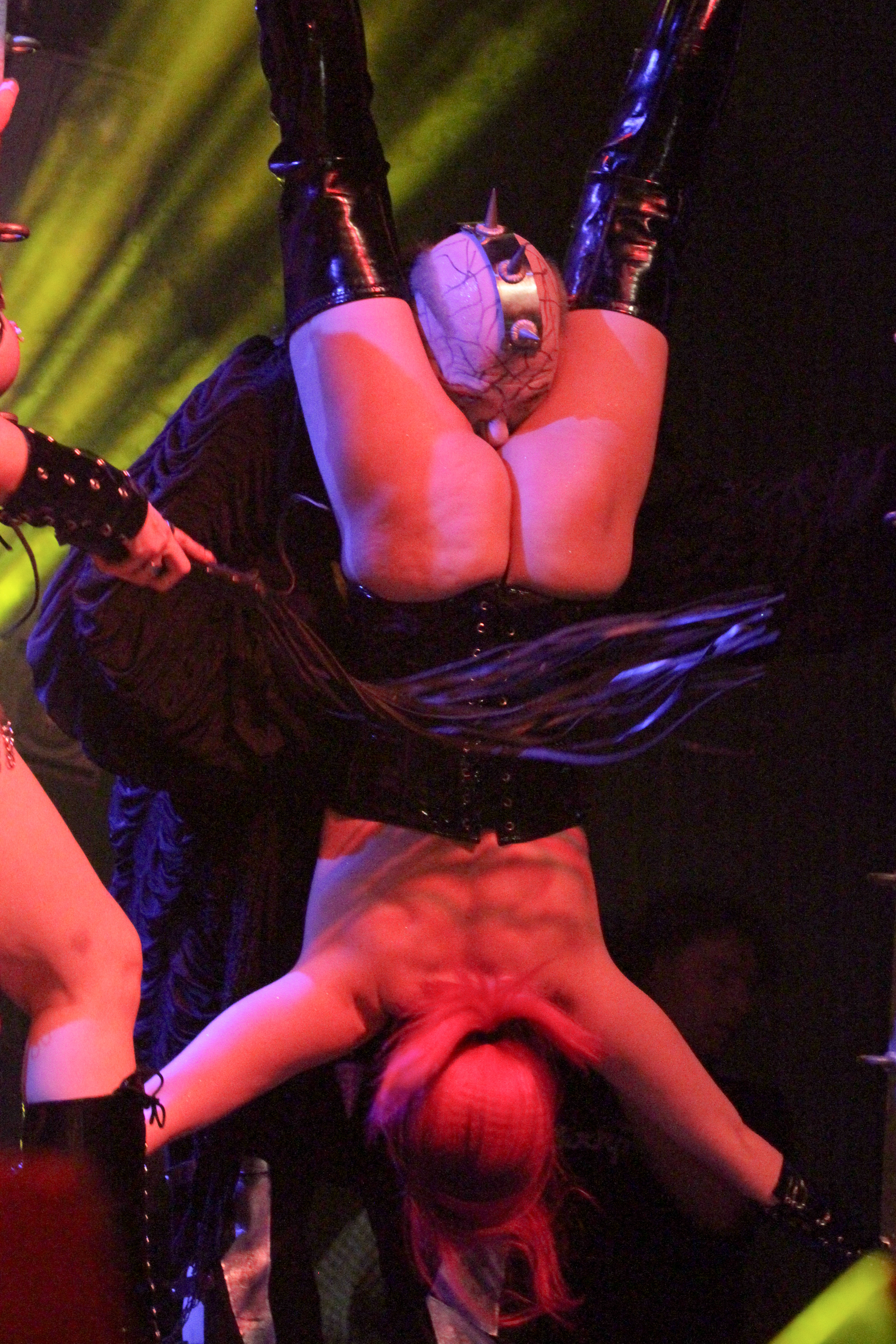
Sexual activity may occur in BDSM, but it is not essential part of BDSM. Photo shows erotic humiliation of sexual nature being performed at Wave-Gotik-Treffen music festival, Germany, 2014. The submissive woman is stripped naked, hung upside down, whipped and a master doing sexual roleplay of a devil forces himself on her to cause vagina torture.

According to Section 194 of the German criminal code, the charge of insult (slander) can only be prosecuted if the defamed person chooses to press charges. False imprisonment can be charged if the victim—when applying an objective view—can be considered to be impaired in their rights of free movement. According to Section 228, a person inflicting a bodily injury on another person with that person's permission violates the law only in cases where the act can be considered to have violated good morals in spite of permission having been given. On 26 May 2004, the Criminal Panel No. 2 of the Bundesgerichtshof (German Federal Court) ruled that sado-masochistically motivated physical injuries are not per se indecent and thus subject to Section 228.

Following cases in which sado-masochistic practices had been repeatedly used as pressure tactics against former partners in custody cases, the Appeals Court of Hamm ruled in February 2006 that sexual inclinations toward sado-masochism are no indication of a lack of capabilities for successful child-raising.

=== Italy ===
In Italian law, BDSM is right on the border between crime and legality, and everything lies in the interpretation of the legal code by the judge. This concept is that anyone willingly causing "injury" to another person is to be punished. In this context, though, "injury" is legally defined as "anything causing a condition of illness", and "illness" is ill-defined itself in two different legal ways. The first is "any anatomical or functional alteration of the organism" (thus technically including little scratches and bruises too); the second is "a significant worsening of a previous condition relevant to organic and relational processes, requiring any kind of therapy". This could make it somewhat risky to play with someone, as later the "victim" may call foul play citing even an insignificant mark as evidence against the partner. Also, any injury requiring over 20 days of medical care must be denounced by the professional medic who discovers it, leading to automatic indictment of the person who caused it.

=== Nordic countries ===
In September 2010, a Swedish court acquitted a 32-year-old man of assault for engaging in consensual BDSM play with a 16-year-old girl (the age of consent in Sweden is 15). Norway's legal system has likewise taken a similar position, that safe and consensual BDSM play should not be subject to criminal prosecution. This parallels the stance of the mental health professions in the Nordic countries which have removed sadomasochism from their respective lists of psychiatric illnesses.

=== Switzerland ===
The age of consent in Switzerland is 16 years, which also applies to BDSM play. Minors (i.e., those under 16) are not subject to punishment for BDSM play as long as the age difference between them is less than three years. Certain practices, however, require granting consent for light injuries, with only those over 18 permitted to give consent. Consent must be expressed in advance, either expressly or tacitly but perceptibly. In 2025, in a leading case, the Federal Supreme Court convicted a man of rape and assault because he had not sought consent from a woman on the occasion on which he subjected her to violent sexual acts, even though the two had some months previously engaged in consensual sadomasochistic acts in which they agreed (but never used) a safeword.

In 2002, Articles 135 and 197 of the Swiss Criminal Code were tightened to make ownership of "objects or demonstrations [...] which depict sexual acts with violent content" a punishable offense. In the view of a BDSM advocacy group, this amounts to a general criminalization of sado-masochism since nearly every sado-masochist will have some kind of media that fulfills this criterion. They also objected to the law which putting sado-masochists in the same category as pedophiles and pederasts.

=== United Kingdom ===
In British law, consent is an absolute defense to common assault, but not necessarily to actual bodily harm, where courts may decide that consent is not valid, as occurred in the case of R v Brown. Accordingly, consensual activities in the U.K. may not constitute "assault occasioning actual or grievous bodily harm" in law. The Spanner Trust states that this is defined as activities which have caused injury "of a lasting nature" but that only a slight duration or injury might be considered "lasting" in law. The decision contrasts with the later case of R v Wilson in which conviction for non-sexual consensual branding within a marriage was overturned, the appeal court ruling that R v Brown was not an authority in all cases of consensual injury and criticizing the decision to prosecute.

Following Operation Spanner, the European Court of Human Rights ruled in January 1999 in Laskey, Jaggard and Brown v. United Kingdom that no violation of Article 8 occurred because the amount of physical or psychological harm that the law allows between any two people, even consenting adults, is to be determined by the jurisdiction the individuals live in, as it is the State's responsibility to balance the concerns of public health and well-being with the amount of control a State should be allowed to exercise over its citizens. In the Criminal Justice and Immigration Bill 2007, the British Government cited the Spanner case as justification for criminalizing images of consensual acts, as part of its proposed criminalization of possession of "extreme pornography". Another contrasting case was that of Stephen Lock in 2013, who was cleared of actual bodily harm on the grounds that the woman consented. In this case, the act was deemed to be sexual.

=== United States ===
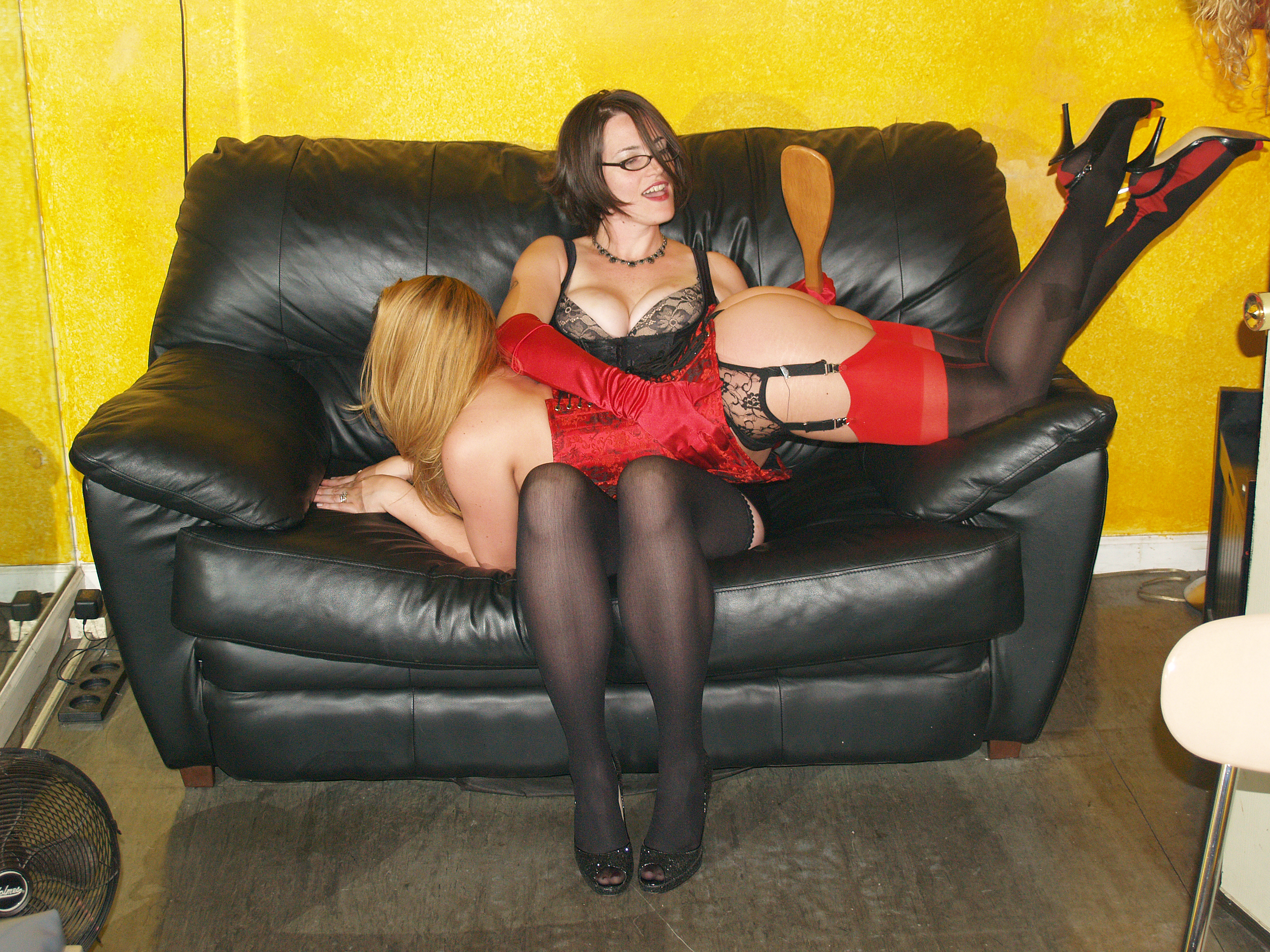
Spanking with a paddle in a BDSM dungeon in Lower Manhattan

The United States Federal law does not list a specific criminal determination for consensual BDSM acts. Many BDSM practitioners cite the legal decision of People v. Jovanovic, 95 N.Y.2d 846 (2000), or the "Cybersex Torture Case", which was the first U.S. appellate decision to hold (in effect) that one does not commit assault if the victim consents. However, many individual states do criminalize specific BDSM actions within their state borders. Some states specifically address the idea of "consent to BDSM acts" within their assault laws, such as the state of New Jersey, which defines "simple assault" to be "a disorderly persons offense unless committed in a fight or scuffle entered into by mutual consent, in which case it is a petty disorderly persons offense".

Oregon Ballot Measure 9 was a ballot measure in the U.S. state of Oregon in 1992, concerning sadism, masochism, gay rights, pedophilia, and public education, that drew widespread national attention. It would have added the following text to the Oregon Constitution:

All governments in Oregon may not use their monies or properties to promote, encourage or facilitate homosexuality, pedophilia, sadism or masochism. All levels of government, including public education systems, must assist in setting a standard for Oregon's youth which recognizes that these behaviors are abnormal, wrong, unnatural and perverse and they are to be discouraged and avoided.

It was defeated in the 3 November 1992 general election with 638,527 votes in favor, 828,290 votes against.

The National Coalition for Sexual Freedom collects reports about punishment for sexual activities engaged in by consenting adults, and about its use in child custody cases.

== Cultural aspects ==
Today, the BDSM culture exists in most Western countries. This offers BDSM practitioners the opportunity to discuss BDSM relevant topics and problems with like-minded people. This culture is often viewed as a subculture, mainly because BDSM is often still regarded as "unusual" by some of the public. Many people hide their leaning from society since they are afraid of the incomprehension and of social exclusion.

In contrast to frameworks seeking to explain sadomasochism through psychological, psychoanalytic, medical or forensic approaches, which seek to categorize behaviour and desires and find a root "cause", Romana Byrne suggests that such practices can be seen as examples of "aesthetic sexuality", in which a founding physiological or psychological impulse is irrelevant. Rather, sadism and masochism may be practiced through choice and deliberation, driven by certain aesthetic goals tied to style, pleasure, and identity. These practices, in certain circumstances and contexts, can be compared with the creation of art.

=== Symbols ===
The leather pride flag, a symbol of the BDSM and leather subculture

The BDSM rights flag with triskelion-type emblem

One of the most commonly used symbols of the BDSM community is a derivation of a triskelion shape within a circle. Various forms of triskele have had many uses and many meanings in many cultures; its BDSM usage derives from the Ring of O in the classic book Story of O. The BDSM Emblem Project claims copyright over one particular specified form of the triskelion symbol; other variants of the triskelion are free from such copyright claims.

The triskelion as a BDSM symbol can easily be perceived as the three separate parts of the acronym BDSM; which are BD, DS, and SM (Bondage & Discipline, Dominance & Submission, Sadism & Masochism). They are three separate items, that are normally associated together.

The leather pride flag, shown to the right, is a symbol for the leather subculture and also widely used within BDSM. In continental Europe, the Ring of O is widespread among BDSM practitioners.

The BDSM rights flag, shown to the right, was designed by Tanos, a Master from the United Kingdom. It is partially loosely based on the design of the leather pride flag, and also includes a version of the BDSM Emblem (but not similar enough to fall within Steve Quagmyr's specific copyright claims for the Emblem). The BDSM rights flag is intended to represent the belief that people whose sexuality or relationship preferences include BDSM practices deserve the same human rights as everyone else, and should not be discriminated against for pursuing BDSM with consenting adults.

The flag is inspired by the leather pride flag and BDSM emblem but is specifically intended to represent the concept of BDSM rights and to be without the other symbols' restrictions against commercial use. It is designed to be recognizable by people familiar with either the leather pride flag or BDSM triskelion (or triskele) as "something to do with BDSM"; and to be distinctive whether reproduced in full colour, or in black and white (or another pair of colours).

BDSM and fetish items and styles have been spread widely in Western societies' everyday life by different factors, such as avant-garde fashion, heavy metal, goth subculture, and science fiction TV series, and are often not consciously connected with their BDSM roots by many people. While it was mainly confined to the punk and BDSM subcultures in the 1990s, it has since spread into wider parts of Western societies.

=== Film and music ===
- In music: The Romanian singer-songwriter ro:NAVI featured BDSM and Shibari scenes in her music video "Picture Perfect" (2014). The video was banned in Romania for its explicit content. In 2010, Rihanna's song "S&M" and Christina Aguilera's single "Not Myself Tonight" appeared, both full of BDSM imagery. Madonna has acted in the BDSM-themed movie Body of Evidence (1993).
- In movies: While BDSM activity appeared initially in subtle form, in the 1960s famous works of literature like Story of O and Venus in Furs were filmed explicitly. With the release of the 1986 film 9½ Weeks, the topic of BDSM was transferred to mainstream cinema. From the 1990s, cinematic representation of alternative sexualities, including BDSM, increased dramatically, as seen in documentary productions such as Graphic Sexual Horror (a 2009 film based on the website Insex), Kink (a 2013 film based on the website Kink.com), and movies such as Fifty Shades of Grey (2015) and its two sequels Fifty Shades Darker (2017) and Fifty Shades Freed (2018). Raaz (2002) was Bollywood's first brush with BDSM — a dark romance where control, submission, and desire ignited a new kind of passion.
  - The Fifty Shades movies have been criticised for conflating abusive activities with consensual BDSM activities. "A lot of what happens in the main relationship of Fifty Shades of Grey is domestic abuse, both physical and emotional, and for people whose entire understanding of BDSM now comes from jiggle balls and rooms of pain this is a dangerous misconception to foster."

=== Theater ===
Although it would be possible to establish certain elements related to BDSM in classical theater, not until the emergence of contemporary theater would some plays have BDSM as the main theme. Exemplifying this are two works: one Austrian, one German, in which BDSM is not only incorporated but integral to the storyline of the play.

- Worauf sich Körper kaprizieren, Austria. Peter Kern directed and wrote the script for this comedy which is a present-day adaption of Jean Genet's 1950 film, Un chant d'amour. It is about a marriage in which the wife (film veteran Miriam Goldschmidt) submits her husband (Heinrich Herkie) and the butler (Günter Bubbnik) to her sadistic treatment until two new characters take their places.
- Ach, Hilde (Oh, Hilda), Germany. This play by Anna Schwemmer premiered in Berlin. A young Hilde becomes pregnant, and after being abandoned by her boyfriend she decides to become a professional dominatrix to earn money. The play carefully crafts a playful and frivolous picture of the field of professional dominatrices.

=== Literature ===
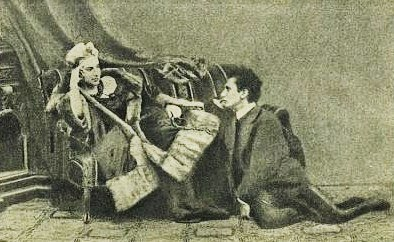
Fanny Pistor (with whip) and Leopold von Sacher-Masoch. Venus in Furs was inspired by the author's own life where he was dominated by a woman.

Although examples of literature catering to BDSM and fetishistic tastes were created in earlier periods, BDSM literature as it exists today cannot be found much earlier than World War II.

The word sadism originates from the works of Donatien Alphonse François, Marquis de Sade, and the word masochism originates from Leopold von Sacher-Masoch, the author of Venus in Furs. However, it is worth noting that the Marquis de Sade describes non-consensual abuse in his works, such as in Justine. Venus in Furs describes a consensual dom-sub relationship.

A central work in modern BDSM literature is undoubtedly Story of O (1954) by Anne Desclos under the pseudonym Pauline Réage.

Other notable works include 9½ Weeks (1978) by Elizabeth McNeill, some works of the writer Anne Rice (Exit to Eden, and her Claiming of Sleeping Beauty series of books), Jeanne de Berg (L'Image (1956) dedicated to Pauline Réage), the Gor series by John Norman, and naturally all the works of Patrick Califia, Gloria Brame, the group Samois and many of the writer Georges Bataille (Histoire de l'oeil-Story of the Eye, Madame Edwarda, 1937), as well as those of Bob Flanagan (Slave Sonnets (1986), Fuck Journal (1987), A Taste of Honey (1990)). A common part of many of the poems of Pablo Neruda is a reflection on feelings and sensations arising from the relations of EPE or erotic exchange of power. The Fifty Shades trilogy is a series of very popular erotic romance novels by E. L. James which involves BDSM; however, the novels have been criticized for their inaccurate and harmful depiction of BDSM.

In the 21st century, a number of prestigious university presses, such as Duke University, Indiana University and University of Chicago, have published books on BDSM written by professors, thereby lending academic legitimacy to this once taboo topic.

=== Art ===
- In photography: Eric Kroll and Irving Klaw (with Bettie Page, the first well-known bondage model), and Japanese photographer Araki Nobuyoshi, whose works are exhibited in several major art museums, galleries and private collections, such as the Baroness Marion Lambert, the world's largest holder of contemporary photographic art. Also Robert Mapplethorpe, whose most controversial work is that of the underground BDSM scene in the late 1960s and early 1970s of New York. The homoeroticism of this work fuelled a national debate over the public funding of controversial artwork.
- Comic book drawings: Guido Crepax with Histoire d'O (1975), Justine (1979) and Venere in Pelliccia (1984); inspired by the work of Pauline Réage, the Marquis de Sade and Leopold von Sacher-Masoch. John Willie and The Adventures of Sweet Gwendoline (1984) which was the basis for the film The Perils of Gwendoline in the Land of the Yik-Yak. The Sunstone/Mercy (2011-ongoing) books by Stjepan Sejic have become very popular and are found in many conventional bookstores around the world.
- In graphic design: Eric Stanton and his work on dominance and female bondage, as well as Hajime Sorayama and Robert Bishop.
- In art deco sculpture: Bruno Zach produced perhaps his best known sculpture—called "The Riding Crop" (c. 1925)—which features a scantily clad dominatrix wielding a riding crop.

== See also ==
- Autosadism
- Dominance hierarchy
- Glossary of BDSM
- List of BDSM equipment
- List of BDSM organizations
- List of bondage positions
- Leather subculture
- Outline of BDSM
- Vulnerability and care theory of love
