= Psychopathia Sexualis (disambiguation) =

Psychopathia Sexualis is an 1886 book by Richard von Krafft-Ebing.

Psychopathia Sexualis may also refer to:

- Psychopathia Sexualis, a controversial comic by Miguel Ángel Martín
- Psychopathia Sexualis, an album by The Makers
- Psychopathia Sexualis (album), a 1982 album by Whitehouse
- Psychopathia Sexualis (film), a 2006 film directed by Bret Wood
- Psychopathia Sexualis (Kaan book), an 1844 moral psychology book about human sexuality by Heinrich Kaan
- Psychopathia Sexualis (play), a 1998 play by John Patrick Shanley
