= Professional submissive =

Sex worker who performs the submissive role in BDSM activities

A professional submissive is a person who performs the submissive role in BDSM activities in exchange for money. Most professional submissives do not have sex with their clients.

Professional submissives are rarer than professional dominants.
