= Psychopathia Sexualis (Kaan book) =

Psychopathia Sexualis (Latin for Psychopathies of Sexuality) is a book written in 1844 by the Russian physician Heinrich Kaan. In this work, Kaan transformed and reinterpreted the Christian sexual sins (homosexuality, masturbation etc.) as mental diseases. An English translation appeared in 2016.

Contemporary reviews were written by Maximilian von Heine, Heinrich Ellinger and Gustav Blumröder.

In 1861, Kaan published a continuation to his book in an article titled "Psychiatrische Skizzen" [Psychiatric Sketches].
