= Bondage pornography =

Pornography depicting bondage and related acts

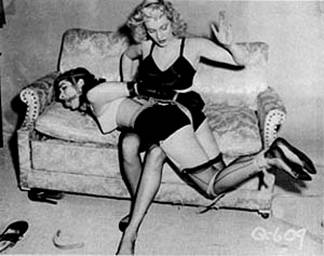
- Categories: Pornography, Erotica
- Cultural origins: Early 20th century, United States and Europe
- Stylistic origins: Pulp magazines, pin-up girl photography, underground fetish art
- Subgenres: Femdom, BDSM erotica, Kinbaku
- Related topics: Bondage fetishism, BDSM, Erotic humiliation

Bondage pornography, also referred to as bondage erotica is the depiction of sexual bondage or other BDSM activities using photographs, stories, films or drawings. Though often described as pornography, the genre involves the presentation of bondage fetishism or BDSM scenarios and does not necessarily involve the commonly understood pornographic styles. The genre often prioritizes the aesthetics of physical restraint over explicit depictions of sexual acts or nudity.

== History ==
=== Before 1970s ===
In the early 20th century, bondage imagery was available through "detective magazines", and comic books often featured characters being tied up or tying others up, particularly in "damsel in distress" plots.

There were also a number of dedicated fetish magazines which featured images of fetishism and bondage. The first of such magazines in the United States was Bizarre, first published in 1946 by fetish photographer John Willie (the phallic pseudonym of John Coutts), who developed the concept in the 1920s. Willie was able to avoid controversy in censorship through careful attention to guidelines and the use of humor.

Willie is better remembered for his Sweet Gwendoline comic strips.The comic strips were published largely in the 1950s and 60s.

Though Bizarre was a small format magazine, it had a huge impact on later kink publications, such as ENEG's fetish magazine, Exotique, published 1956–1959. Exotique was entirely devoted to fetish fashions and female-dominant bondage fantasies. The 36 issues featured photos and illustrations of dominatrix-inspired vamps (including Burtman's wife Tana Louise and iconic model Bettie Page) wearing exotic leather and rubber ensembles, corsets, stockings/garters, boots, and high heels. Gene Bilbrew contributed illustrations to the magazine. The articles, many written by Leonard Burtman, using an alias, covered various aspects of sadomasochism and transvestism, with men depicted as slaves to imperious, all-powerful women. Exotique had no nudity, pornographic content, or even sexually suggestive situations. Nevertheless, much like fellow publisher Irving Klaw, in 1957, Burtman would be targeted as a pornographer. He was relentlessly pursued by the U.S. Postal Inspection Service (acting as a censorship agency under the Comstock laws) and local law enforcement (which functioned in coordination with Postal Inspectors and the Catholic Church). Eventually, he was arrested, his magazines and materials confiscated, and brought to trial. This led to the demise of the magazine in 1959.

=== 1970s to 1990s ===
Dedicated bondage magazines again became popular in America in the 1970s. From the mid-1970s through the late 1990s, they were produced by publishers such as Harmony Concepts, California Star, and House of Milan (HOM, Inc.).

=== Late 1990s to onwards ===
From the late 1990s onwards, specialist BDSM pornographic websites such as Insex and the various websites of Kink.com appeared. As Internet pornography became more widely available, the bondage magazine market began to decrease. As of 2003, specialist bondage magazines were mostly displaced by bondage material on the Internet, and bondage imagery is to be found in mainstream pornographic magazines, such as Nugget and Hustler's Taboo magazine.

However, the tradition of bondage magazines continues in the form of "art books" of bondage photographs, published by mainstream publishers such as Taschen.

== Criticism and mainstream media ==
Feminist views on pornography have often regarded bondage magazines as misogynistic. Editorial disclaimers in the magazines typically stated that they portrayed fantasies. Over time, the storylines developed from the traditional "damsel in distress" motif towards descriptions of more restrictive and explicit BDSM practices. Bondage models began to develop fan bases and became recognized stars in their own right.

As the availability of free pornography on the Internet has increased, its possible effects on microaggression towards women have been discussed. Bondage pornography mostly depicts women who are primarily portrayed in situations of female submission, and the concern has been raised that such pornography may promote an attitude legitimising violence against women.

The book series and film 50 Shades of Grey has been said to perpetuate misogyny and portray BDSM/bondage subcultures in a patriarchal and misogynistic light. In this view, to properly reflect the BDSM/bondage subculture it is necessary for pornography to "focus on mutual consent, mutual power, and communication".

== See also ==
- Fetish model
- Irving Klaw
- Japanese bondage
- Kink.com
- List of fetish artists
- Sadism and masochism in fiction
- Splatter film
- Sexual fetishism
