= Exotique =

1950s American fetish magazine

Exotique was a specialized fetish magazine published by Leonard Burtman under his Burmel Publishing Company imprint in New York City between 1951 and 1959. The magazine's femdom theme, photos, and artwork mark it as a direct descendant of the first major fetish magazine Bizarre (1946–1959), produced by John Willie.

Exotique was entirely devoted to fetish fashions and female-dominant bondage fantasies. The 36 issues featured photos and illustrations of dominatrix-inspired vamps (including wife Tana Louise and iconic model Bettie Page) wearing exotic leather and rubber ensembles, corsets, stockings/garters, boots, and high heels. The articles, many written by Burtman using an alias, covered various aspects of sadomasochism and transvestism, with men depicted as slaves to imperious, all-powerful women.

Fetish artists Eric Stanton and Gene Bilbrew, also known by his pseudonym ENEG, were frequent contributors to this magazine and others produced by Burtman.

Exotique had no nudity. Nevertheless, much like fellow publisher Irving Klaw (a major influence on Burton) in 1957, Burtman would be targeted as a pornographer. He was relentlessly pursued by the U.S. Postal Inspection Service (acting as a censorship agency then) and local law enforcement (who functioned in coordination with Postal Inspectors and the Catholic Church). Eventually, he was arrested, his magazines and materials confiscated, and he was brought to trial. This led to the demise of the magazine in 1959.

However, starting in 1960, Burtman (under the Selbee Associates imprint) went on to publish many more fetish magazines that were nearly identical to Exotique such as New Exotique, Masque, Connoisseur, Bizarre Life, High Heels, Unique World, Corporal (a pioneering spanking-fetish magazine), and others well into the 1970s. In 2011 Burtman was inducted into the Leather Hall of Fame.

== See also ==
- Fetish art
- Mara Gaye
- Charles Guyette
- Thigh-high boots
