= Fetish art =

Art that depicts fetishistic situations

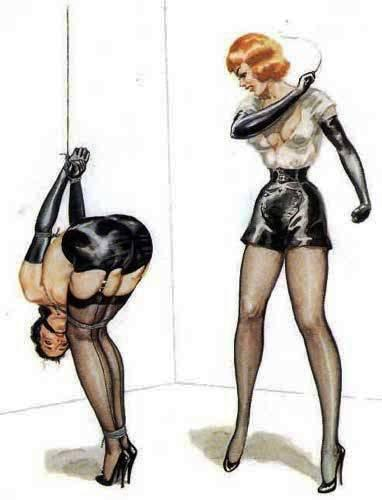
Illustration by John Willie showing a sadomasochistic scene between two women

Fetish art is art that depicts people in fetishistic situations such as S&M, dominance and submission, bondage, transvestism and the like, sometimes in combination. It may simply depict a person dressed in fetish clothing, which could include undergarments, stockings, high heels, corsets, or boots. A common fetish theme is a woman dressed as a dominatrix.

== History ==
Fetish art has been around for a very long time, tracing all the way back to the Han Dynasty in China where some of the earliest pieces of fetish art were found on carved stone and earthenware tiles which depicted an orgy in the springtime. Chinese fetish art in later periods such as the Qing Dynasty tended to show sex in what was considered a more tranquil way where themes of sadism and rape were rarely depicted, and when it was it was normally orchestrated by a man who was depicted as a commoner because they were considered less civilized. Objects such as pomegranates, lotus flowers, peonies, coral, and even rocks were used as sort of symbolic euphemisms for intercourse and genitalia and were depicted in their art. These old symbols still have an impact in modern fetish art in China where they still see use due to censorship on erotic art.

Shunga was a popular form of fetish art during Japan's Edo Period and the following Meiji Era, though shunga art can be traced back all the way to the Heian Era. This type of art was produced and sold lucratively due to it being banned by the ruling Tokugawa shogunate in 1722. Done in the ukiyo-e style, wood block prints were widely used to make and reproduce shunga artwork, with some luxurious prints even going as far to have metallic printing and gradated shading. The more dominant figure was depicted as larger, both in height and with genitalia to a point where it would be disproportionate to the human body. This size-difference was meant to depict age or class difference, with the older or higher class individual being larger and the dominant one.

Heterosexuality was the most common, however themes of homosexuality between two men, as well as bestiality were depicted in shunga as well. A well-known depiction of bestiality in shunga is The Dream of the Fisherman's Wife by Katsushika Hokusai which illustrates a woman being given oral sex from an octopus as it wraps its tentacles around her. Homosexuality between men was primarily depicted in shunga with an older man partnered with an adolescent or prepubescent boy because age-structured homosexuality was considered normal during the time period. Intercourse between two women was also depicted in shunga artwork, though it is comparatively more rare. There was no concept of lesbianism in Japan at the time, so the artwork was made by men entirely for the male gaze.

Orientalist fetish art was originally started by Europeans in the 19th century because imperialism had brought European attention to these nations they considered to be exotic. These European artists relied on their own personal fantasies and imagination, creating fetish art depicting harems of women in nude or Oriental dress that was largely unrealistic to the actual places depicted and did not show a full understanding of their cultures. Though it created inaccurate stereotypes, orientalist fetish art was largely popular in both Europe and America and it remains popular to this day.

In France between the world wars, an illustrator and writer known only by the pseudonym Bernard Montorgueil produced illustrated manuscripts celebrating the dominant woman, among them Dressage and Les Quat' jeudis; the work began to circulate clandestinely in the 1950s and was first published in Rotterdam in 1970.

Charles Guyette (August 14, 1902 – June, 1976) was the first person in the United States to produce and distribute fetish art. In 1935, Guyette went to federal prison, becoming the first martyr of fetish art history. Later, he operated under a series of aliases and owned a costume shop on West 45th Street in New York City. Largely uncredited in his lifetime, Guyette influenced key fetish art innovators, including Irving Klaw, John Willie, Eric Stanton, and Leonard Burtman.

Many of the 'classic' 1940s, 1950s and 1960s-era fetish artists such as Eric Stanton and Gene Bilbrew began their careers at Irving Klaw's Movie Star News company (later Nutrix), creating drawings for episodic illustrated bondage stories.

In 1946 fetish artist John Coutts (a.k.a. John Willie) founded Bizarre magazine. Bizarre was first published in Canada, then printed in the U.S., and was the inspiration for a number of new fetish magazines such as Bizarre Life. In 1957 English engineer John Sutcliffe founded Atomage magazine, which featured images of the rubber clothing he had made. Sutcliffe's work was an inspiration for Dianna Rigg's leather-catsuit-wearing character in The Avengers, a TV show that "opened the floodgates for fetish-SM images".

In the 1970s and 1980s, fetish artists such as Robert Bishop were published extensively in bondage magazines. In more recent years, the annual SIGNY awards have been awarded to the bondage artists voted the best of that year.

Many artists working in the mainstream comic book industry have included fetishistic imagery in their work, usually as a shock tactic or to denote villainy or corruption. The boost that depictions of beautiful women in tight fetish outfits give to the sales of comics to a mostly teenage male comic-buying audience may also be a factor. In 1950s America comics with bondage or fetish themes began appearing. Around the same time, fetish artists influenced the cartoons of George Petty, Alberto Vargas and others, which featured in magazines like Playboy and Esquire. One example of fetish imagery in comics is the catsuit-wearing, whip-wielding Catwoman, who has been called, "an icon of fetish art".

Many S&M, leather and fetish artists have produced images depicting urine fetishism ("watersports"), including Domino, Touko Laaksonen ("Tom of Finland"), MATT, and Bill Schmeling ("The Hun").

Mainstream fine artists such as Allen Jones have included strong fetish elements in their work. An artist whose erotica transcends to mainstream collectors is found in the Shunga and Shibari style works of Hajime Sorayama. Taschen books included artist Hajime Sorayama, whom his peer artists call a cross between Norman Rockwell and Salvador Dalí, or an imaginative modern day Vargas. Sorayama's robotic diverse illustrative works are in the permanent collections of the New York City Museum of Modern Art (MoMA) and the Smithsonian Institution, as well as the fetish arts in the private World Erotic Art Museum Miami collection.

The works of contemporary fetish artists such as Roberto Baldazzini and Michael Manning are published by companies such as NBM Publishing and Taschen.

Today, much fetish art can be found on online platforms such as DeviantArt and Fur Affinity.

In the 21st century, fetish art has increasingly intersected with digital culture and online identity formation. Artists use social media platforms, virtual galleries, and NFT marketplaces to distribute work that blends eroticism with technology. Digital illustration and 3D modeling has expanded the aesthetic possibilities of fetish imagery, enabling artists to explore synthetic textures, latex, and fantasy bodies beyond traditional photography and painting. Platforms that exist such as X, Instagram, and Patreon have also become central spaces for independent fetish artists, however they face frequent censorship and content moderation challenges.

== Fetish art in the digital age ==
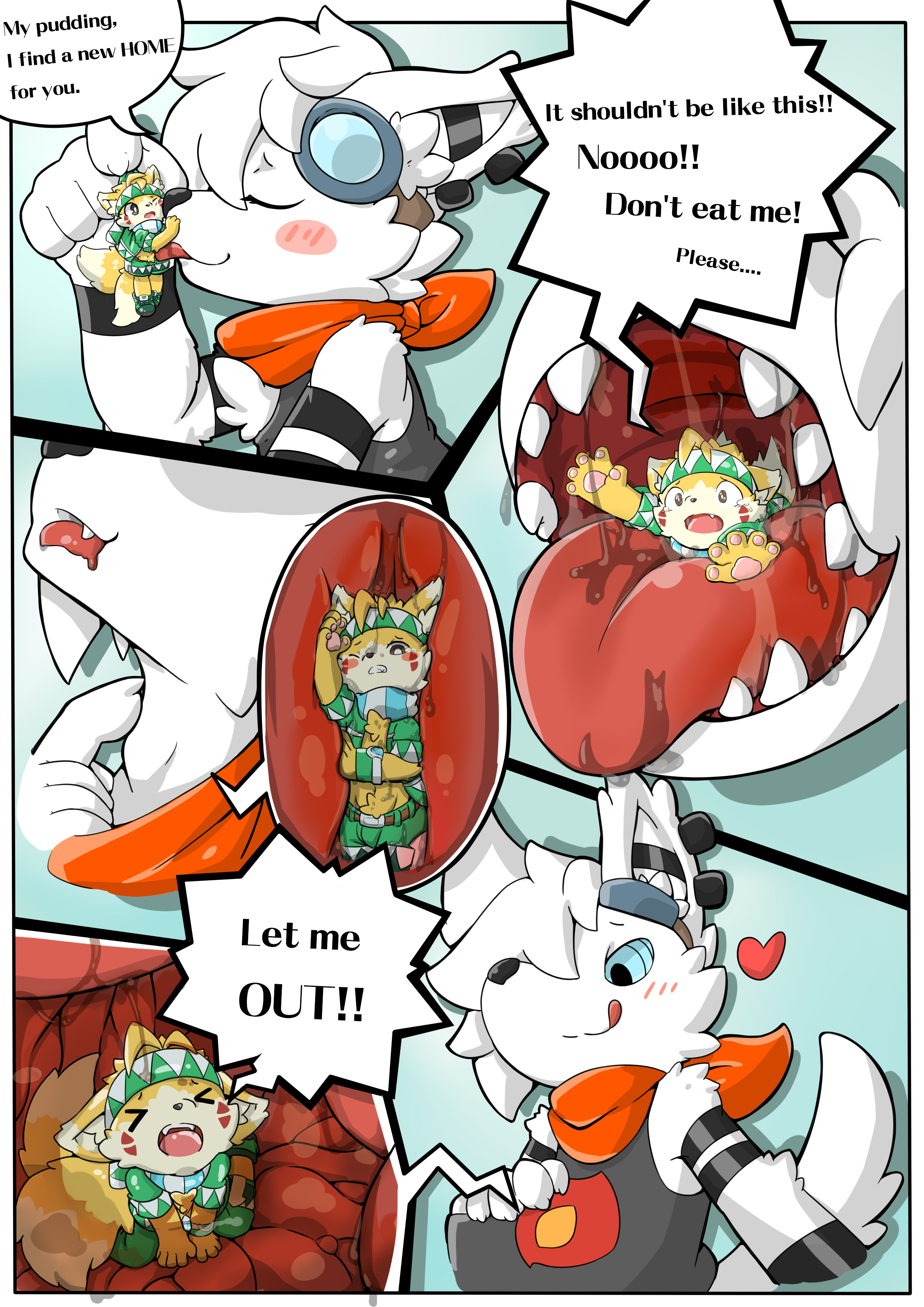
Digital art combining furry characters and vorarephilia

With the growth of access to the internet over the years, fetish art has become increasingly entangled with digital culture and the many online identity formations. Digital illustration, 3D modeling, and photo manipulation have been expanding the technical and aesthetic vocabulary available to many creators. Artists of today are able to render hyperreal synthetic textures such as latex and rubber skins. These creations depart from biological norms and stage virtual scenes that would be difficult or unsafe to create in photography or live performance. Scholars and commentators observe that these practices rejuvenate established fetish themes and create new subgenres that highlight virtual embodiment and material simulation.

Online platforms and marketplaces have also reshaped how fetish art is distributed and monetized. Social networks and image sharing sites more recently NFT marketplaces have all allowed independent creators to reach global audiences and to develop direct financial relationships with collectors and patrons. Some argue that these channels democratically lower barriers to entry for marginalized or niche creators and permit alternative economic models outside traditional gallery systems. Critics warn that new monetization forms such as NFT's reproduce existing market inequalities and may commodify intimate or marginalized sexual cultures.

A recurrent challenge for digital fetish artists is content moderation and censorship. Major platforms apply a mix of human review and automated filters that often struggle to distinguish between erotic content, sexual expression, and art. The opacity of moderation rules have led to frequent takedowns, de-platforming, reduced visibility/censorship, or account restrictions for creators whose work falls within or near platform defined prohibitions. Artist led initiatives and critics have documented numerous instances in which historical and contemporary artworks were removed or suppressed, which fuels debates about artistic freedom and cultural policing of sexual content.

In response to perceived restrictions, some institutions and creators have sought alternative channels. Museums and cultural organizations in several cases have experimented with subscription or adult oriented platforms more notably OnlyFans in order to present works that mainstream social networks would otherwise limit, arguing that the move preserves access to canonical art while highlighting inconsistencies in moderation policies. At the same time, regulatory pressures in various jurisdictions such as age verification requirements and legal orders have produced additional complexity for platforms and creators, sometimes prompting blanket removals of adult oriented accounts.

These developments have spurred academic and activist engagement. Researchers have begun to analyze how algorithmic moderation shapes visibility and community formation, while advocacy campaigns for example artist coalitions like the DDA calling for clearer rules and greater transparency seek reform. The ongoing conversation positions fetish art within larger questions about digital governance, sexual representation, and the economics of contemporary visual culture.

== Modernized fetish culture ==
As art in general has developed, social media has become a prominent space that places emphasis on participatory cultures, which shape accessibility, production and public reception of art. Audiences on platforms such as Reddit are used to create niche fan communities, who often contribute to the platform through commentary feedback, collaborative creation, and inspired works, allowing for a space that fosters connections between artists and their audience.

With fetish art becoming prevalent in the digital space, there is an increasingly reflected global influence that has allowed for fetish art to become more evident in media. Creators and audiences globally share and exchange their unique aesthetic styles, themes, and cultural motifs with one another. In a cultural setting, the word fetish was used to represent an object with a strong symbolic potential, now it's digitally modernized as something which is meant to provoke a sensation of and underlying sexual desire, that is detached from the original purpose of the object. These collaborations and the reimagining the concept of fetish have contributed to the evolution of new sub genres and hybrid categories, expanding the limits of fetish art beyond traditional boundaries. Fetish art grows rapidly as people find new ways to place a sexual context on objects that can evoke a sensation of pleasure.

Fetish Art within the digital space has become a form of expression that goes beyond traditional boundaries, allowing creators to experiment with aesthetic, style, identity, and desire in ways that were previously considered extremely taboo. As online communities grow, artists are able to exchange ideas, reinterpret cultural motifs, and collaborate. These digital connections not only increase the capabilities of fetish art in terms of breaking community ideologies such as gender norms, but also allows for new ethical conversations surrounding the importance of consent.

== See also ==
- Erotic art
- Robert Bishop
- Charles Guyette
- Eric Stanton
- Gene Bilbrew
- Jeff Gord
- Irving Klaw
- John Willie
- List of fetish artists
- Damsel in distress
- Fetish model
- Photomanipulation
- Yiff
