= Tana Louise =

- Occupation: Burlesque striptease artist
- Known for: Fetish model
- Spouse: Leonard Burtman

Tana Louise was a burlesque striptease artist, nicknamed the "Cincinnati Sinner", in the 1950s. However, she was more famous as a fetish model. She contributed regularly to the fetish magazine Exotique, as both a columnist and model, and married the owner of the magazine, Leonard Burtman. Among the photographers that she worked with was Irving Klaw.

In 1950, she was accused of hitting fellow stripper, Emerald Forrest, over the head with a club. When asked of the charges, Louise responded: "T'ain't so".

By the late 1950s, her marriage to Burtman had begun to deteriorate and they divorced. Soon after, she left the magazine and disappeared from the public eye. She was one of the most famous fetish models of her day, but, as time went on, she was overshadowed by her peer, Bettie Page.

Louise was sued by Tina Louise for allegedly "swiping her name and capitalizing on her fame".

In the 1960s, Tana Louise and burlesque striptease artist Mara Gaye started an exotic bizarre costumes mail order catalog company called "Tana and Mara".
