= Bondage cover =

Magazine cover featuring bondage

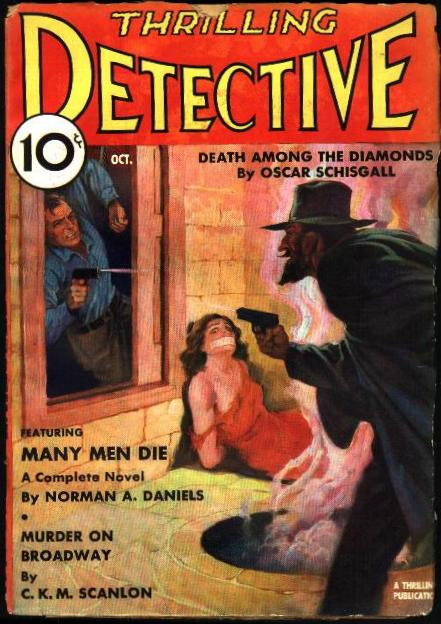
Thrilling Detective cover, 1935

A bondage cover, as opposed to a bondage magazine, was a general-interest magazine that featured bondage imagery on its cover, usually an image of a bound and gagged woman.

== Painted covers ==
These were the earliest examples of bondage cover art images, and ran from about 1910 (when the pulps became more common) until roughly 1975 (when the "men's adventure" type of magazines started to disappear).

The peak era for these seems to be the 1930s with weird menace and detective pulps and the 1960s heyday of men's adventure magazines.

== Photo covers ==
Perhaps the earliest detective magazine to employ photographic covers was Actual Detective Magazine, whose first issue appeared in November 1937. The earliest use of a color photo on a cover is the February 1939 issue of True magazine, with the February 1940 edition apparently the first to feature a gag worn by a damsel in distress. The peak era for these was the era from roughly 1959 until 1986, when, due to the Meese Commission (a contribution by Park Dietz), and the end of a few of the publishers of detective (or "true crime") magazines, the main era of the bondage cover ended, though there were a few issues of Detective Dragnet in the late 1980s and early 1990s, and a brief revival from about 1994 until 2000, though even then they were few and far between (unlike the late 1960s, when at least two such covers could be seen monthly). Also, the use of over-the-mouth gags was common enough that the slang term "detective gag" is used for it.

== Controversy ==
Due to many detective magazines and comics being aimed at younger audiences, bondage covers often caused controversy. Controversy intensified in the socially conservative 1950s, prompting psychiatrist Fredric Wertham to write his 1954 book Seduction of the Innocent. Examinations of bondage covers and other related phenomena let to the creation of the Comic Code Authority.
