= Gene Bilbrew =

American cartoonist and fetish artist

- Born: Eugene Bilbrew; June 29, 1923 Los Angeles, California, U.S.
- Died: May 1974 (aged 50) New York City, U.S.
- Areas: Cartoonist, Artist
- Pseudonyms: ENEG, Van Rod, Bondy
- Notable works: Island of Captive Girls, Prison for Women, The Whip Artist, High Heels in the Heavens, Madam Adista, Dangerous Years Satin Satellite, Exotique magazine

Eugene "Gene" Bilbrew (June 29, 1923 – May 1974) was an American vocal group singer, cartoonist, and "bizarre art" pioneer. As noted in the biography, GENE BILBREW REVEALED: The Unsung Legacy of a Fetish Art Pioneer, he was "the first black career fetish artist in history." Starting in the mid-1950s, he was among the most prolific illustrators of fetish-oriented pulp book covers. In addition to signing his work under his own name, he produced art under a range of pseudonyms, including ENEG ("Gene" spelled backwards), Van Rod, and Bondy.

== Early life ==
The Bronze Bomber challenges a coroner's jury on the facts behind the lynching of two Black men.

Born in Los Angeles in 1923, Bilbrew's first career was as a vocal group singer, performing with The Mellow Tones and the Basin Street Boys.

Pérez Seves debunked the myth that Bilbrew illustrated or produced the comic strip series named The Bronze Bomber for the African-American newspaper, Los Angeles Sentinel. In truth, Bilbrew's friend William Alexander produced the strip for the Los Angeles Tribune. One printed page, showing the Bomber cartoon from March 8, 1943, was repurposed by artist Mildred Howard as the base layer of her collage Millenials & XYZ #IV (2014), which is in the permanent collection of the Jordan Schnitzer Family Foundation. Four of the six panels are partly or wholly obscured by other elements of the collage. The upper three panels show the source and style. The Tribune began publication in 1941, but the earliest microfilm copies begin in September 1943, and the Bomber does not appear there. By early 1944, Alexander was in the Army. During 1941–1944, March 8 was a Monday only in 1943. Bilbrew was then 18 years old.

According to Pérez Seves, later that year, at age 19, Bilbrew would evade the draft due to psychiatric reasons and become a founding member of his first vocal group, The Mellow Tones.

== Career ==
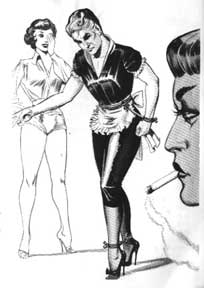
A forced feminization drawing from Women Bind and Dominate Male Maid by Bilbrew

Starting in 1950, Bilbrew switched from singing to illustrative art. His first professional art job was for the hugely influential comics artist Will Eisner on The Spirit, where Bilbrew took over the back-up series Clifford—a humor page for small children—after its originator Jules Feiffer was drafted into the army. Bilbrew's Clifford was syndicated as a weekly comic strip by General Features from 1951 to 1952.

The start of Bilbrew's "bizarre art" career came in 1951 through underground artist and pioneer Eric Stanton, whom Bilbrew met while attending Cartoonists and Illustrators School. From then on, Bilbrew focused on fetish art, producing work for notable underground publishers Irving Klaw, Edward Mishkin, Stanley Malkin, and the Sturman brothers. He also notably produced many illustrations and covers for Leonard Burtman, publisher of Exotique, a fetish magazine published between 1955 and 1959.

== Death ==
While his career waned with the coming of relaxed censorship laws of the 1960s, his substance abuse worsened in the early 1970s. According to Eric Stanton, Gene Bilbrew died in the back of a Times Square adult bookstore in May 1974.

== Other ==
In 2019, the National Leather Association International established an award named after Bilbrew for creators of animated erotic art.

== See also ==
- Exotique (fetish magazine)
- Fetish art
- Fetish artist
- Charles Guyette
- Irving Klaw
- Bettie Page
- Eric Stanton
- John Willie
