= List of fetish magazines =

Sexual fetish publication

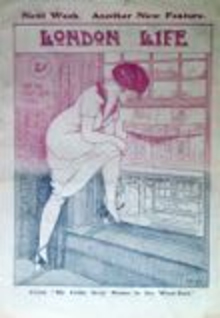
Front cover from London Life, 1921, an early British fetish magazine

A fetish magazine is a type of magazine originating in the late 1940s which is devoted to sexual fetishism. The content is generally aimed at being erotic rather than pornographic. Fetish magazines are usually devoted to a specific fetish, such as leather fetishism, rubber and PVC fetishism, cross-dressing, bondage, sadomasochism, female domination, sexual roleplay, corporal punishment, etc. Much of the content in fetish magazines is baffling to people who do not share the particular fetishes discussed and depicted.

The most well-known early examples are Bizarre (1946–1959) published by John Willie and Leonard Burtman's Exotique, Masque, Connoisseur, Bizarre Life, High Heels, Unique World, and Corporal. London Life, a British fetish magazine published in the inter-war period of the 20th century, dates back to the 1920s.

An early study, The Undergrowth of Literature by Gillian Freeman (1967), concluded that such magazines provide a catharsis for those whose sexual needs are otherwise unsatisfied: she identified rubberwear magazines as the most popular at the time.

== Rubberist magazines ==
- AtomAge
- Dressing for Pleasure
- Marquis
- O
- Pussy Cat (UK, N.A. Burton, 1964–1989)
- Shiny International
- Skin Two
- Bedeseme

== Bondage magazines ==
Japan:

- Kitan Club (1947–1975)

United States:

- Bizarre (published by John Willie, 1946-1959)
- Bizarre Life (Consolidated Publishing Inc., 1966–1971)
- Exotique (Burmel Publishing Co., 1955-1959)
- Bondage in the Buff (House of Milan, 1982–1999), issue 3:4 photos
- Bondage Photographer (House of Milan, 1982–2000)
- Bound to Please (House of Milan, 1973), issue 4:12 photos
- Bridled (Lyndon Distributors, Ltd., c. 1990s), issue #28
- Captured (House of Milan, 1975–1999), cover photo archive
- Hard Bound (Lyndon Distributors, Ltd., 1990s), photos
- Hogtie (House of Milan, 1972–1992), cover photo archive
- Hogtied (House of Milan, 1993–1999), issue 6:1 photos
- Knotty (House of Milan, 1971–2002), issue 5:6 photo
- Knots & Kinks (Lyndon Distributors, Ltd., c. 1990s), photo
- Latent Image (House of Milan, c. 1990s), letters, personals, photo
- Leashed (Lyndon Distributors, Ltd., c. 1990s), photo, photo 2
- Strict! (House of Milan, 1982-1997), photo
- Ties That Bind (House of Milan, 1990s), photo: issue 1:8
- Tight Ropes (House of Milan, 1980s), issue 2:6

Europe:

- Secret (1991–2008)

== Spanking magazines ==
- Blushes (UK, 1984-1994)
- Corporal (Consolidated Publishing/Eros-Goldstripe, 1960s-70s)
- Das neue Flagellanten Forum (Germany), website
- Der gelbe Onkel (Germany, DBS-Zirkel, 1997-?)
- Februs (UK, a Janus imprint, 1994–2003)
- Frauen unter der Peitsche (Germany, c. 1980s), photos
- Freies Forum für Erziehungsfragen (Germany, ArtPrint-Media Verlag, 1967-2019)
- Janus (UK, 1971–2007)
- Kane (UK, 1982 to present, ed. Harrison Marks 1982–1997)
- Martinet (UK, 1975-c.1985), cover photo
- Over The Knee Spanking (Lyndon Distributors Ltd., 1980s-90s), issue #3 photo
- Phoenix (UK, 1980–1991), Issue 1:2 photos
- Punished (House of Milan, 1978–2001), Issue 2:6
- Rohrstockmagazin (Germany, Rohrstock-Verlag, 1980s-2000s)
- Roué (UK, c. 1978–1988), issue #2 photos
- Spank Hard (Lyndon Distributors Ltd., 1990s), issue #3 photo
- Stand Corrected (Shadow Lane, 1990s)
- Sting (UK, Parliament Publications, 1970s)
- Strict! (House of Milan, c. 1980s-90s)
- Uniform Girls (UK, Blushes imprint), 1985-90s
- Whispers (UK, Blushes imprint)

== Femdom magazines ==
- Black and Blue
- Capitulation
- Cruella
- Dominant Mystique
- Domination Directory International
- Fetish World
- Forced Womanhood
- Obey (UK), a Janus imprint
- Obey Me (Parliament, 1983)
- The Vault
- Whap!

== Cultural magazines ==
- Bizarre (UK, Dennis Publishing, 1997–2015)
- Fet-X
- Fetish Times (UK, editor Mark Ramsden, 1994–?)
- KFS Magazine
- Demasque Magazine
- Skin Two magazine

== Other ==
- Splosh! (UK, 1989–2001) – wet and messy fetishism
- Girl in the Fishnet! – fishnet fetishism
- Leash Magazine (Canada) – fetish and BDSM magazine
- Whiplash (Canada) – fetish and BDSM magazine
- Smoke Signals – smoking fetishism magazine
- Wet Set Magazine (Australia) – omorashi magazine
- Modern Dungeon Quarterly (Perverted Imp Productions, 2012– ) – fetish, kink and BDSM magazine
- Von Gutenberg (Canada) – fetish fashion, fantasy and lifestyle magazine
- Bedeseme Magazine (Spain, 2009) – alternative lifestyle, fetish and kink magazine
- Massad Magazine (Netherlands, 1968) - fetish and BDSM magazine
- London Life, published 1920s - 1960s - fetish magazine

== See also ==
- Fetish fashion
- Fetish model
