= Mara Gaye =

American showgirl and burlesque dancer (1920–2005)

- Born: Marjorie Helen Ginsberg; September 16, 1920; Bronx, New York, US
- Died: July 22, 2005 (aged 84)
- Occupation: Burlesque dancer

Mara Gaye (September 16, 1920 – July 22, 2005), born Marjorie Helen Ginsberg in The Bronx, New York, was a professional showgirl, dancer with the Radio City Music Hall Rockettes (1938–1943), and exotic burlesque striptease dancer of the 1940s through the 1960s. She also performed under the name Marjorie Gaye.

== Biography ==
Gaye was cast as a dancer alongside the then-unknown Ann Miller in the 1936 film The Devil on Horseback. She won both the Miss North Dallas and Miss Dallas beauty contests in 1936. In the mid-1930s, she performed at the Little Theatre of Dallas. She traveled with her mother to California in search of a talent agent that turned out to not exist. At that time, she was also contemplating forming a tap-dancing duo with Miller until her father made her return home. She studied professional dance in Los Angeles.

In April 1936, she was chosen to participate in the "Discoveries of 1936" show at the Wilshire-Ebell Theatre by the Assistance League of Southern California located in Hollywood, California.

In 1937, Gaye performed at the Casa Mañana 4,000-seat theatrical restaurant in Texas as part of the Fort Worth Centennial Frontier Fiesta exhibition produced by Billy Rose. Fan dancer Sally Rand was the main attraction of the show. Gaye continued to perform in the Casa Mañana show when it moved and opened in New York City.

In 1943 and 1944, she was a dancer in the Broadway and traveling show Mexican Hayride. Other shows she performed in include Yankee, Riviera, and My Dear Public with Nanette Fabray. During 1944, she danced with the Sande Dancers in musical shorts called the Soundies such as "Home Again Polka" with Lawrence Welk. In 1945–46, she became the captain (lead dancer) at the Clover Club in Miami, working for Boots McKenna. Other jobs included that of hat check and cigarette girl.

In the 1950s-60s, during her exotic striptease dance career, Gaye performed at Minsky's, Theaters of the I. Hirst Circuit (Wheel) such as the Troc in Philadelphia, the Hudson Theater, Empire Theater, Club Samoa on 52nd Street Broadway NYC, the Willows in Rochester, NY, on stage in Detroit, Michigan, as well as numerous private functions such as the Outdoor Knitwear Association Convention at the Waldorf Astoria in New York.

While on the Izzy Hirst Circuit, she was a new strip feature with a different undress-and-dress routine. k At the Holiday Theater, Broadway, New York City, on the marquee "On Stage Michael Rose Capers PARIS SPICE, in person Mara Gaye. Her many shows were met with reviews such as "An Instant Hit" Boston Record,

Gaye was once the birthday surprise for Baseball Hall of Fame shortstop Phil Rizzuto. Numerous display ads for her act appeared in the NY Daily News, NY Daily Mirror, NJ newspapers, as well as mentions in the NY Burlesque Bits and gossip columns.

On stage, she performed with Peaches at the Empire, Lili St. Cyr at Minsky's, Lotus DuBois, Flash O'Farrell, Georgia Sothern, and many others. Her friends included Ann Corio, Comic Lou Ascol and his wife stripped talker Petti Dayne who named their child after Gaye.

In 1954 at Minsky's in Newark, Mara Gaye and Lili St. Cyr had a feud over who would be the first to introduce the black eye patch to burlesque.

In the 1960s, she and Tana Louise started an exotic bizarre costumes mail-order catalog company called Tana and Mara. Tana was the wife of Lenny Burtman, who published Exotique Magazine.

Photographs of Gaye can be found in many of the early pin-up magazines and publications of the 1950s and 1960s, including Bold, Calvacade of Burlesque, Cherchez la Femme, Dazzle, Frolic, Gala, Hollywood Confidential, Night and Day, Play, Playgirl, Pose, Tab, Tom Boy, Uncensored, and Vue. The magazine photos do not always credit her by name.

Mara Gaye's vanity and a few personal items are on view in the ongoing spotlight section of the Museum of Sex in New York City.
