= Fetish model =

Person employed to display, advertise and promote extreme provocative attire

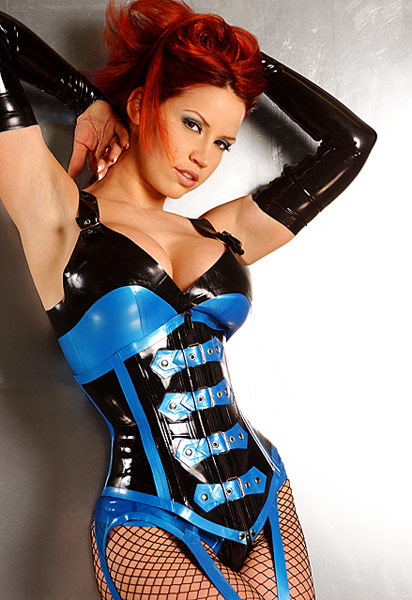
Bianca Beauchamp modelling a latex corset

A fetish model is a model who models fetish clothing or accessories that augment their body in a fetish-like manner or in fetishistic situations. Fetish models do not necessarily work exclusively in that form of modeling.

Fetish models often wear fetish fashion, an extreme and provocative style of clothing designed to elicit a strong emotional reaction or sexual desire on the part of the observer. Such clothing ranges from exotic stylized bathing suits to body armor and sci-fi fantasy suits.

Bondage models appear in various forms of bondage. Other fetish modeling may involve body modification, appearing in fetish photography or exotic glamour photography, or wearing sexual fantasy costumes that fulfil a uniform fetish (e.g. French maid, nurse, etc.). As well as modelling for photography, fetish models also make public appearances at events such as BDSM fairs and parties.

Some pornographic actors and glamour models also work as fetish models.

== Types of fetish models ==
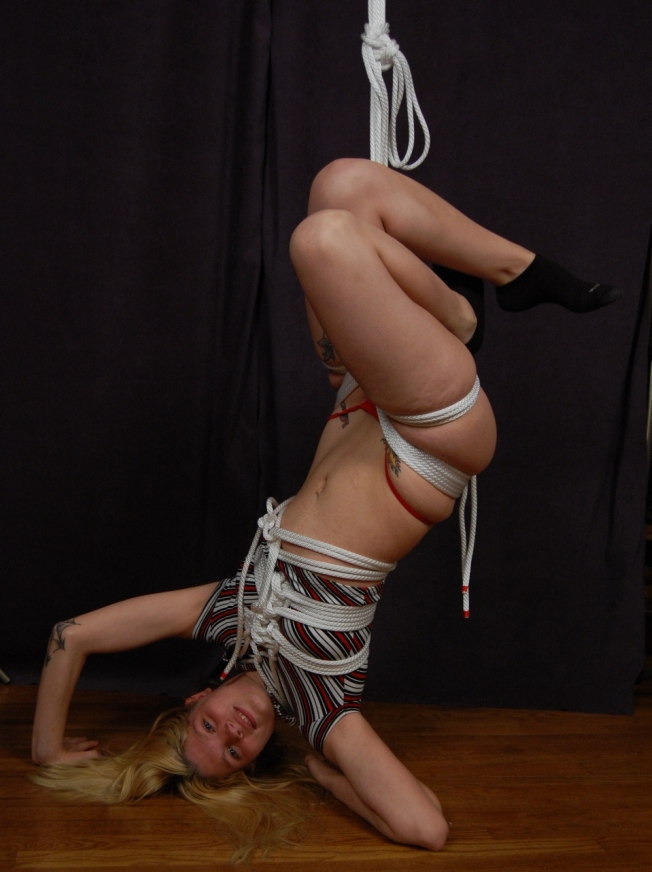
A model prepares for a suspension bondage scene

Fetish modelling covers a wide range of fetishes, including those involving bondage and shibari, latex and PVC, corsets, tattoos, body piercings, shoe fetishism, food fetishism and nyotaimori. Fetishes may also involve body parts, such as breast fetishism, navel fetishism and foot fetishism.

Fetish videos also include ballbusting, a subgenre of CBT pornography.

Fetish models are usually considered to work in a different category from Gothic fashion models or alternative models, whose work is generally far more niche-specific. Fetish modelling is usually considered to be a part of the sex industry due to the popular perception that it has a solely adult audience. However, in recent times, many aspects of the fetish fashion market have been incorporated and accepted into mainstream fashion, with fashion creators using exotic materials such as latex or sheer fabric instead of cotton or wool for their creations. Some fetish models only involve themselves in the aesthetic aspects of the work rather than involving themselves directly with sex and sexuality.

== Popular culture ==
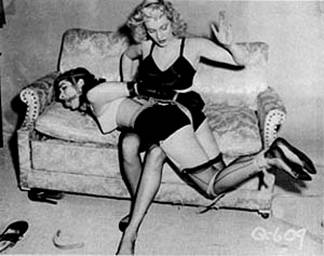
Bettie Page is tied and spanked in an image from Bizarre.

There have been several notable performers and producers of both the bondage and fetish area who have attained mainstream notability. The most recognized is the 1950s bondage model and pin-up girl, Bettie Page, who posed for photographer Irving Klaw for mail-order photographs and was subsequently featured in Playboy. She was the first famous bondage model.

In the 1960s, the popular British TV program The Avengers included several fetish costume elements worn by its female lead performers. This began with Honor Blackman and included Diana Rigg's leather catsuits and leotards, as well as Tara King's use of thigh-length boots and leather evening gloves.

The neo-burlesque performer Dita Von Teese started her career as a fetish model and stripper. Other notable fetish models include the Russian-American performer Mosh and the Canadian photographic model Bianca Beauchamp.

== Markets ==
There are specialized fetish magazines that feature and promote fetish models, including Skin Two, Secret, Italian A Magazine (not to be confused with the now defunct A(sian) Magazine), and Marquis.

Fetish models may run personal adult pay websites and are featured on fetish adult pay sites.

There are also fetish fashion designers. Most of these designers employ fetish models for their clothing line. Fetish fashion shows are hosted several times a year, including Vex, The Baroness, Skintwo, and House of Harlot.

== Awards ==
The SIGNY awards were awarded each year between 2000 and 2005 (except 2002) to the bondage models voted as the best of that year. The SIGNY award winners have been:

- 2000: Eve Ellis, runners-up Ashley Renee, Andrea Neal
- 2001: Ashley Renee, runners-up Andrea Neal, Eve Ellis
- 2003: Jasmine Sinclair, runners-up Amber Michaels, Ashley Renee.
- 2004: Jenni Lee, runners-up Jewell Marceau, Emily Marilyn (Molly Matthews)
- 2005: Jewell Marceau, runners-up Ashley Renee, Christina Carter

== See also ==
- Bondage rigger
- Fetish art
- Japanese bondage
- Nyotaimori – serving sushi on the body of a naked woman
- Total enclosure fetishism
- Uniform fetishism
