= Charles Guyette =

American artist (1902–1976)

Charles Guyette (August 14, 1902 – June, 1976) was a pioneer of fetish style, the first person in the United States to produce and distribute fetish art, and regarded as the mail-order predecessor of Irving Klaw. Later known as the "G-String King," he is best remembered for his fetish photographs, some of which featured sadomasochistic content.

== Biography and legacy ==
Guyette worked as an innovative burlesque costumer and dealer in theatrical accessories, providing vintage corsets, opera gloves, custom-made fetish boots, and, most famously, G-strings. Employed by National Police Gazette editor, Edythe Farrell, he later provided costumes, high heel shoes and boots, and occasionally photographs for publisher Robert Harrison, known for pin-up magazines such as Wink, Titter, Beauty Parade, Whisper, and Eyeful. He was also important in early fetish community social circles of the day and in the careers of John Willie and Irving Klaw. Guyette was a fetish fashion pioneer.

Guyette was also influenced by earlier fetish designs including those of Yva Richard.

In 1935, Guyette went to federal prison, becoming the first martyr of fetish art history. Later, he operated under a series of aliases and owned a costume shop on West 45th Street in New York City. Largely uncredited in his lifetime, Guyette influenced key fetish art innovators, including Irving Klaw, John Willie, Eric Stanton, and Leonard Burtman.

The subject of a book tribute, Charles Guyette: Godfather of American Fetish Art, he is also featured in the independent biopic on Wonder Woman creator William Moulton Marston. The film Professor Marston and the Wonder Women, written and directed by Angela Robinson, features Guyette as the costumer for Wonder Woman's real-life inspiration, Olive Byrne. Guyette is played by actor JJ Feild. In 2025 Guyette was inducted into the Leather Hall of Fame.

== See also ==
- Gene Bilbrew
- Fetish fashion
- Irving Klaw
- Bettie Page
- Eric Stanton
- Dita Von Teese
- John Willie
