= Self-bondage =

Form of erotic pleasure

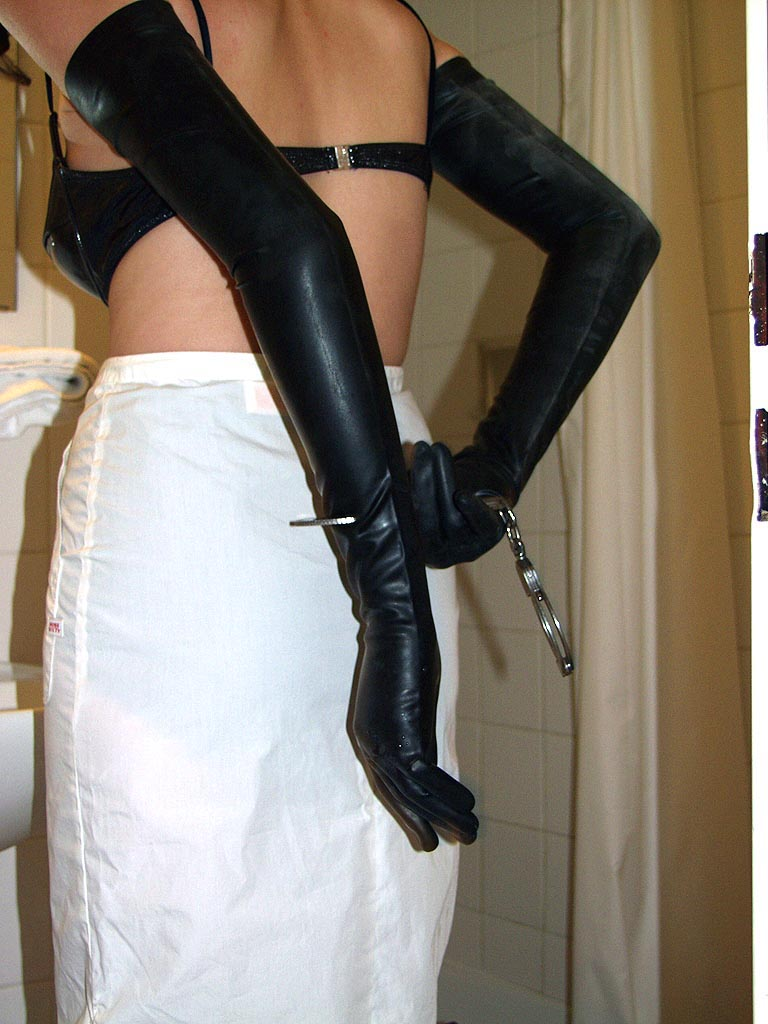
Woman handcuffing herself

Self-bondage refers to the use of restraints on oneself for erotic pleasure. It is a form of erotic bondage which can be practiced alone.

Self-bondage is characterized by experimentation and ingenuity, and can be riskier than conventional bondage. Self-bondage requires use of techniques for self-binding as movement becomes increasingly restricted as more restraints are applied, and also requires a reliable release mechanism. Many types of bondage equipment can be applied before the one that restrains the hands. For example, leg irons can be applied, as well as gags, blindfolds, etc.

For many of its practitioners, the added challenges and dangers are a part of the appeal of self-bondage, who often devise elaborate self-bondage schemes and release mechanisms, both in practice and in erotic fiction.

== Risks ==
Self-bondage is considered a higher-risk activity than many other BDSM practices — particularly when combined with autoerotic asphyxia — and has led to a number of recorded deaths. The death in 1994 of Stephen Milligan, the British Conservative MP for Eastleigh, was a case of autoerotic asphyxiation combined with self-bondage.

Self-bondage has all the risks of physical restraint and sexual bondage, with the added factor that should anything go wrong, there is no one to effect a rescue. For example, if blood circulation cuts off sensation in limbs, the planned escape mechanism may not be usable.

== Types ==
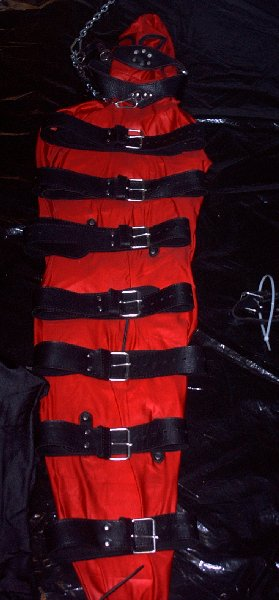
Preparation of a strict self-bondage with leather belts and a special version of a lycra bodybag

Self-bondage can be either strict or sensual.

=== Sensual self-bondage ===
In sensual self-bondage, escape from restraints is simple and available immediately, if desired. For example, the keys might be within reach or the knots loosely tied. The chief aim is the sensation of immobility and of constrained movement.

=== Strict self-bondage ===
Strict self-bondage requires that the means of escape be unavailable until the lapse of time before the release mechanism activates itself. This feature of strict self-bondage makes it potentially more hazardous, but some practice it for the greater sense of helplessness it creates.

=== Emergency intervention ===
A compromise position between safety and strictness allows for a backup release mechanism that is available immediately, but carries with it some penalty or cost with its use. For example, keys could be placed in a bucket of paint. The person in self-bondage can escape quickly if necessary, such as a fire breaking out, or excessive numbness of limbs. However, the annoyance of cleaning up the paint afterwards would coerce the person into waiting for the main release mechanism to come into effect if they were merely bored or uncomfortable. Another penalty may be the need to contact somebody, with the penalty being having to explain what has happened.

== Release mechanisms ==
Many release mechanisms are used in self-bondage to allow the practitioner to escape the restraints after a period of time. There are various trade-offs to be made between ease of use, reliability, precision of timing, cost, and so forth. There should be several mechanisms available, thus ensuring redundancy and safety.

- Ice cubes are commonly used as a release mechanism. For example, a key can be placed in water which is then frozen. The key will not be available until the ice melts. Advantages include simplicity and reliability. The disadvantage is that it can be difficult to gauge precisely how long a scenario will last, although some enjoy the uncertainty.

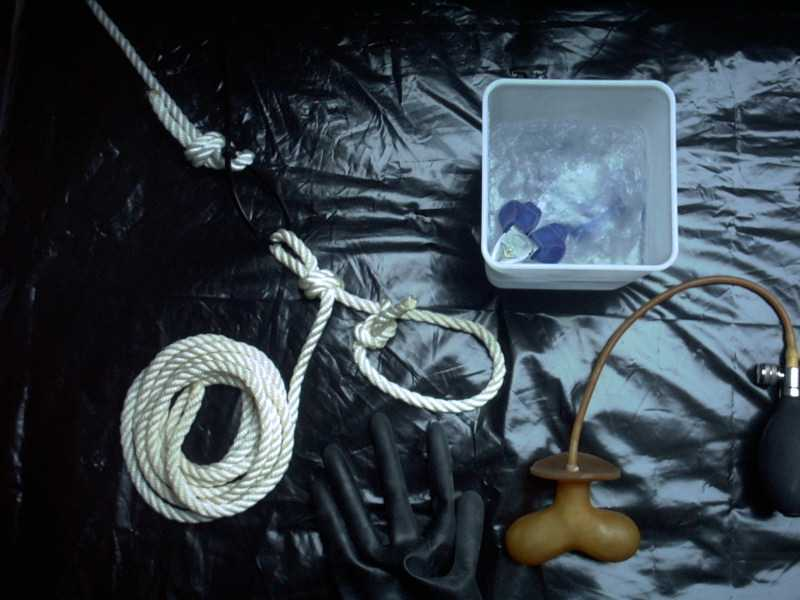
Self-bondage preparations with an ice lock as release mechanism

- Ice locks are frozen together and do not move until the ice has melted down. These can be used alone (to lock a person to a stationary object) or in combination with tightening devices (to keep the tension for a certain period of time).
- "Salt locks": Salt, sugar or any other safe water-soluble substance blocks parts of a lock. It needs to be dissolved in order to release the mechanism.
- Combination locks can be used as release mechanisms. These can rely on the time needed to try every possibility for an unknown combination, or they can rely on light in order to see to enter the known combination correctly.
  - Unknown combination: The idea is that the lock is reset to an unknown combination, then used to lock the bondage in place. The person must find the correct combination by trial and error. A three digit combination lock contains a thousand possibilities. At a second per attempt, this could take up to 16 minutes and 40 seconds, usually less assuming the combination starts with lower numbers. For a four-digit lock, it is nearer two hours. Disadvantages include the fact that it may be distracting to actively "crack" the lock.
  - In darkness: Even if the number is known, for many locks, it is not possible to enter the combination without being able to see the faces of the dials. This release mechanism relies on darkness. The light can be provided either by the morning sunlight, or, preferably, through a light on a time switch. The advantages include a large amount of control over how long the bondage lasts (with a timer), and a backup of the onset of daylight. The disadvantages are only being able to use the technique at night, and having to perform the bondage in the dark.
- Electromagnets: Electromagnets can be used to release keys after a delay. If combined with electronics or a computer, a large amount of control is possible over the timing, and the mechanism is somewhat "fail-safe" — if power fails, the key will fall early. Disadvantages include complexity and cost. The powerful electromagnets used in door locks can also be adapted for use directly as restraints.
- Soldering irons: Soldering irons can be used, in conjunction with a timing mechanism, to cut a nylon rope, or to release keys. This may be a fire hazard unless appropriate precautions are taken.
- The use of a delivery/messenger service or regular mail in order to obtain the object (usually key/keys) needed in order to become released. This relies on the delivery service being 100% reliable.

=== Emergency backup ===
There are also a number of release mechanisms designed to be emergency backups. The idea behind these release mechanisms is that triggering them will cause something undesirable to happen, and thus are only used in situations where death or serious injury could occur otherwise.

- Paint tin: A backup key is stored in a bucket of paint, ink or motor oil in such a way that recovering the key will cause the contents of the container to spill, causing costly damage to a carpet or other possessions. This mechanism can be used for extremely quick release in an emergency such as a fire, but can make the situation worse if a flammable liquid is used.
- Unpleasant drink: An unpleasant liquid, such as urine (the safety of this is discussed in the article Urophagia), is stored in a container. The key is only released when the contents of the container have been drunk (it should be designed so that the contents can not be spilled). The idea is to make the drink so unpleasant that it will only be considered as a last resort.
- Rescue: A friend or relative is notified to come over at a certain time (that time being after the bondage session is planned to end). The friend may or may not be aware of the bondage. An alternative is to position a phone somewhere that is accessible during the bondage, so that a friend or the emergency services may be called if the planned release mechanisms fail.

== Techniques ==
Apart from release mechanisms, self-bondage poses a somewhat awkward problem of getting into bondage, especially when using rope. What might be a relatively simple matter for more than one person can be considerably more complex alone.

With rope, the main difficulty is tying the hands in a way that is not easy to untie. One common solution is to use a cinch noose — essentially a kind of slip knot — together with a coil (a loop of rope). The wrists are placed through the coil with the cinch noose between the wrists and around the coil. To achieve a basic hogtie position, the cinch noose is tied to the ankles. With pressure, the noose tightens the wrist coil, securing the hands. It proves very difficult to escape from, and usually a knife or scissors is required to cut free.

Equipment that can be tightened only, and not loosened, often has application in self-bondage. This includes handcuffs, zip ties and ratcheting pulleys.

== Commercial equipment ==
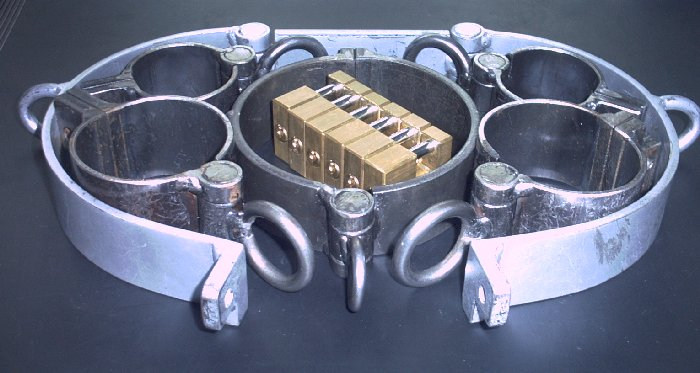
Professional metal cuffs set for bondage and self-bondage purposes

While for the most part self-bondage is performed using ordinary and easily available equipment (indeed, it lends itself to impromptu adaptation and a "do it yourself" approach), a few commercial products have appeared — in the United States and United Kingdom for the most part — catering for the self-bondage practitioner.

== See also ==
- Escape artist
