= O (German magazine) =

German fetish magazine

O was an international fetish magazine published in Germany. The name comes from the French sadomasochistic novel Story of O by Anne Desclos.

== History and profile ==
O was started in 1989 as a successor to the German version of Skin Two magazine, Skin Two Germany. The magazine was owned by Techcom GmbH from its start to 1994 when it was acquired by Ronald Brockmeyer.

It was published in German and English. It was first published by Peter W. Czernich (No. 1 - 24). During this period it was subtitled as the Art of Fetish, Fashion and Fantasy. The last issues, O No. 25 (which was designed by David Sparks, who went on to publish his own magazine Mirror Mirror, a fetish who's- who) and 26, were published by Ronald Brockmeyer. Its subtitle was changed to the Art, the Fashion, the Fantasy.

The magazine was notably in a trademark dispute with Oprah Winfrey and Hearst Magazines over their O: The Oprah Magazine title.

O magazine ceased publication in 1994 and was followed by Marquis magazine.

== See also ==
- Fetish magazine
