= Paul Little (author) =

American novelist

Paul Hugo Little (1915–1987) was an American pulp fiction writer and author of the historical novels forming the Windhaven series and The Hawk and the Dove series under the pen names Marie de Jourlet and Leigh Franklin James respectively. He was the author of 700 historical fiction, erotica and romance novels mostly published under pseudonyms. He also published a few books under his own name including Chessworks (a book on chess theory) and The Condominium Trap (a literary novel).

Kenan Heise of the Chicago Tribune says "The Guinness Book of World Records lists a South African woman, Kathleen Lindsay, as the most prolific writer with 904 novels. Mr. Little believed he was second, averaging a novel every week and a half since 1963."

Little died in 1987 at the age of 72.
