= Over-arm =

Body position

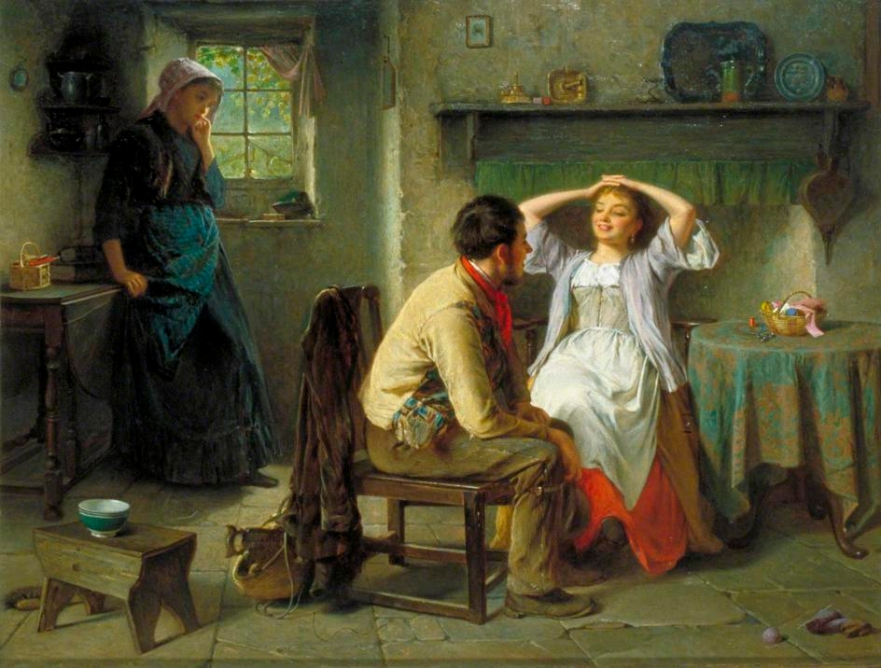
A study in body language: Haynes King's Jealousy and Flirtation

An over-arm position is a body position in which a person's arms are extended over their shoulders or behind their head. This may take place, for example, during work or sporting activity, and is used in stretching exercises or during meditation besides other activities.

In wrestling, for example, nelson holds are over-arm holds, in a contest for physical dominance, as are several other over-arm positions.

In cricket, Overarm bowling is the norm.

Also, in law enforcement, the raising of the arms above or behind the head is a gesture of surrender or submission, as it is in a military situation.

== Over-arm strap ==
Over-arm straps involves tying a person's wrists behind their head, then securing the waist or other areas with the strap. A simple over-arm strap can be used for tickling, preventing the bound person from protecting their ticklish spots (such as the armpits or ribs).

During sexual activity, the person making the over-arm strap motion is considered submissive. Many people view this motion by their partner as erotic.

Over-arm straps can be part of more complex bondage techniques. For example, passing a rope across the back between the legs and securing it in front creates a crotch rope.

== See also ==
- Body language
- List of bondage positions § Over-arm tie
- Overarm bowling
