= Eric Stanton =

American illustrator (1926–1999)

- Eric Stanton, circa late 1950s, early 1960s
- Born: Ernest Stanzoni; September 30, 1926 New York City, U.S.
- Died: March 17, 1999 (aged 72) West Haven, Connecticut, U.S.
- Areas: Writer, Penciller, Inker
- Notable works: Sweeter Gwen, Bound in Leather, Pleasure Bound, Tame-Azons, Stantoons, Blunder Broad, Princkazons.

Eric Stanton (born Ernest Stanzoni Jr.; September 30, 1926 – March 17, 1999) was an American underground cartoonist and fetish art pioneer.

While Stanton began his career as a bondage fantasy artist for Irving Klaw, the majority of his later work depicted gender role reversal and proto-feminist female dominance scenarios. Commissioned by Klaw starting in the late 1940s, his bondage fantasy chapter serials earned him underground fame. Stanton also worked with pioneering underground fetish art publishers, Leonard Burtman (publisher of Exotique and Selbee magazines), the notorious Times Square publisher Edward Mishkin, paperback publisher Stanley Malkin, and later magazine publisher George W. Mavety. For a decade, Stanton also shared a working studio with Marvel Comics legend Steve Ditko.

Past the soft-core era of the 1960s, his art became more transgressive. Creating a mail-order business in the 1970s named the "Stanton Archives," Stanton sold his work directly to fans and, starting in 1982, issued offset staple-bound fan-inspired books known as "Stantoons," producing more than a hundred by the time of his death. In his lifetime, Stanton also contributed to countless underground publications and later adult magazines like Leg Show and Leg World. In 1984, Stanton had the only art exhibit in his lifetime at the New York City nightclub Danceteria. Artists Banksy, Allen Jones, and Madonna among others took inspiration from Stanton's work.

== Biography ==
=== Early life and career ===
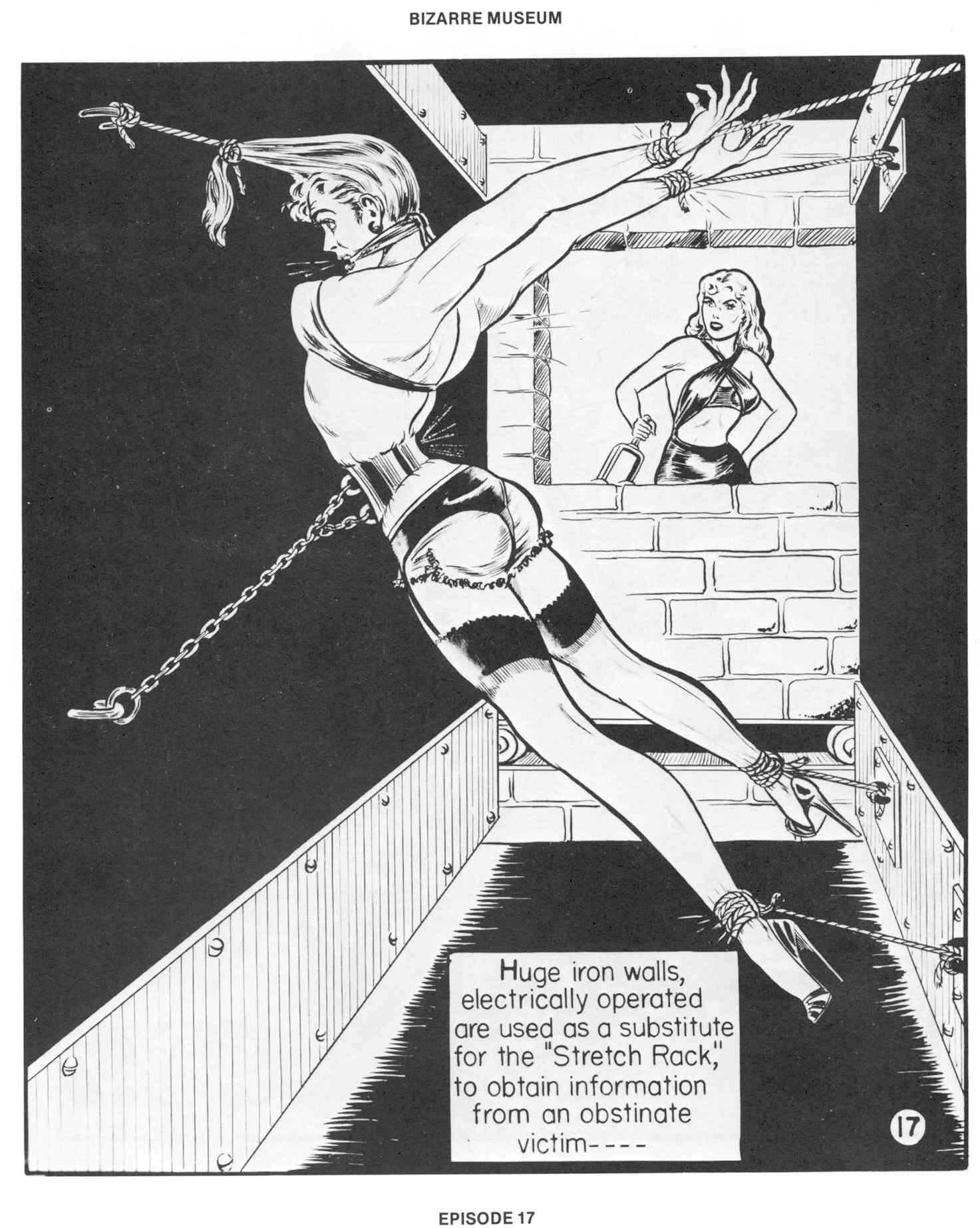
An episode from Bizarre Museum, originally published in 1951–1952

Stanton was born and raised in Brooklyn, New York, the son of an Italian father and a Russian mother. During World War II, while in the US Navy, a head injury left him partially color blind. Following this, he was an art assistant to Boody Rogers on Sparky Watts or Babe, supplying background art and plot ideas. Though his personal preference was for drawing lady wrestling and fighting women comics, he was commissioned to create bondage fantasy chapter serials by Irving Klaw, who also sold pin-ups and movie stills from his shop on 212 E. 14th Street. This marked the beginning of his fetish art career. Stanton then attended the Cartoonists and Illustrators School in the early 1950s, studying under comics artist Jerry Robinson and others. One classmate was future Spider-Man and Dr. Strange co-creator Steve Ditko. Another was Gene Bilbrew, whom he introduced to Klaw.

From 1958 to 1968, Stanton shared a Manhattan studio at 43rd Street and Eighth Avenue with Ditko. For many years, the two collaborated on fetish comics. Ditko biographer Blake Bell, without citing sources, said, "At one time in history, Ditko denied ever touching Stanton's work, even though Stanton himself said they would each dabble in each other's art; mainly spot-inking", and the introduction to one book of Stanton's work says, "Eric Stanton drew his pictures in India ink, and they were then hand-coloured by Ditko". In a 1988 interview with Greg Theakston, Stanton recalled that although his contribution to Spider-Man was "almost nil", he and Ditko had "worked on storyboards together and I added a few ideas.... I think I added the business about the webs coming out of his hands". According to the fetish art historian and Stanton biographer Richard Pérez Seves, Stanton may have purposely underplayed his role and contribution to Spider-Man to maintain his friendship with Ditko. Even more startling, evidence exists that Stanton also made uncredited contributions to Dr. Strange.

=== Later career ===
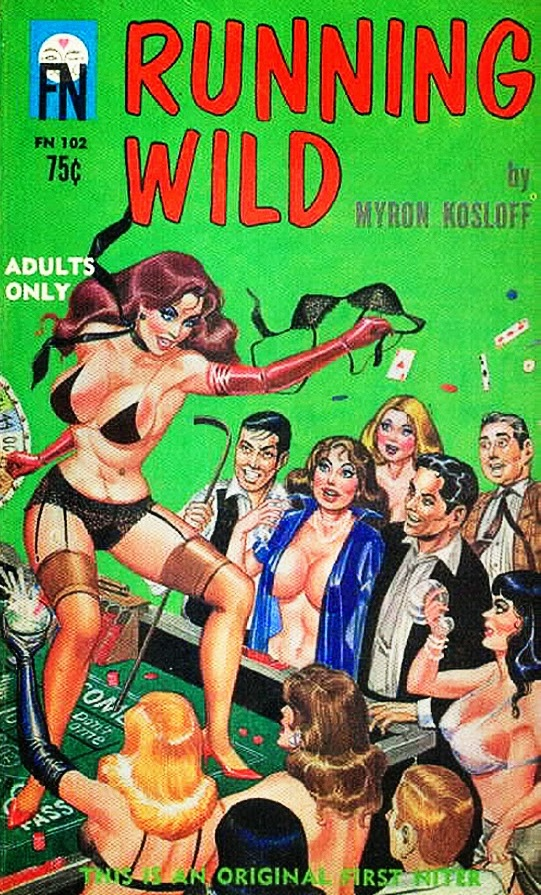
Cover illustration by Eric Stanton for Running Wild by Myron Kosloff (a pseudonym of Paul Little)

Starting in the late 1960s, Stanton supported himself by self-publishing and distributing his work to a quasi-underground network of subscribers and patrons. His offset printed Stantoons comic-book series, which began in 1982, continued to his death in 1999 and featured many of his best-known "transgressive" concepts, including the superheroine Blunder Broad, and the Amazon-like Princkazons.

==== Blunder Broad ====
Stanton created Blunder Broad in the 1970s with writer Andrew J. Offutt (a.k.a. Turk Winter) for use in a great number of BDSM adventures. A parody of Wonder Woman, Blunder Broad is an inept superheroine who continually fails in her missions and is invariably tortured by her enemies, who include a lesbian supervillainess called Leopard Lady, Pussycat Galore, or Cheetah, and her male sidekick Count Dastardly. Blunder Broad can be deprived of her super strength when subjected to cunnilingus.

==== Princkazons ====
With "Lady Princker", Stanton and Shaltis (as well as Alan Throne and Winter) created the Princkazons storyline in which women around the world grew oversized female penises, or "princks". These women also grew taller and stronger than men and began dominating and humiliating the men in public, including facesitting, urophagia, coprophagia, and anal and oral rape.

== Legacy ==
Beginning in the mid-1970s, Bélier Press, a New York publisher of vintage fetish art, reprinted many of Stanton's comic serials in its 24-volume Bizarre Comix series. Titles, mainly from the 1950s, include Dianna's Ordeal, Perils of Dianna, Priscilla: Queen of Escapes, Poor Pamela, Bound in Leather, Duchess of the Bastille, Bizarre Museum, Pleasure Bound, Rita's School of Discipline, Mrs. Tyrant's Finishing School, Fifi Chastises Her Maids, A Hazardous Journey, Helga's Search for Slaves, Madame Discipline, and Girls' Figure Training Academy.

Book-length collections of Stanton comics have been translated into many foreign languages, including French, Italian, German, Spanish, and Dutch. Additionally, Stanton's art was reprinted in the 1990s in comic books from Fantagraphics Books' imprint Eros Comix: The Kinky Hook (1991), Sweeter Gwen (1992), Confidential TV (1994), and Tops and Bottoms #1–4 (1997). Individual issues were subtitled "Bound Beauty" (#1), "Lady in Charge" (#2), "Broken Engagement" (#3), and "Broken Engagement 2" (#4).
