= Marquis (magazine) =

Fetish magazine

Marquis is a Germany- based fetish magazine originally produced by Peter W. Czernich since 1994. For around 25 years, the magazine was published under his auspices. First, the magazine ceased publication in 2015 with issue 63. Then, in 2016, issue 64 appeared after an economic restructuring. Czernich's last issue as editor-in-chief in charge was issue 67, the 25th anniversary issue. Czernich's original publishing venture entitled «O» began as a spin-off of the British Skin Two magazine but quickly developed its own identity. After losing the right to the «O» name, Czernich created Marquis in 1994. It has continued to be published semiannually-to-quarterly ever since.

== The Time after Peter W. Czernich ==
In 2019, the magazine was sold to the U-Line publishing house, which had mainly appeared with its imprint "Ubooks" in the years before. Marquis issue 68 was released in March 2020. Peter W. Czernich remained on board as creative consultant and photographer, but the owner of U-Line Verlag, Andreas Reichardt, was now responsible. In the first issue under new management, the cabaret artist Lisa Eckhart, among others, could be won for an exclusive interview along with a photo shoot in latex.

Marquis magazine is published semi- to quarterly. It is mainly made for fetish, latex and fashion lovers. Topics include photography, models, books, films, fashion and lifestyle. The name of the magazine refers to the Marquis de Sade. The first issue was published in 1994 as a successor to the magazine O.

== Heavy Rubber ==
The magazine Heavy Rubber was created as a spin-off in 1996. While Marquis magazine focuses more on fashion, mainstream and glamour, Heavy Rubber is clearly aimed at fetishists. It is all about latex, rubber as a source of erotic pleasure.
