= John Willie =

British artist and photographer

- Born: John Alexander Scott Coutts; 9 December 1902; British Singapore
- Died: 5 August 1962 (aged 59); Guernsey, British Isles
- Occupations: artist; photographer; comic strip cartoonist; magazine publisher and editor; (1945–1956)
- Known for: Sweet Gwendoline, Publisher of the first 20 issues of Bizarre magazine.

John Alexander Scott Coutts (9 December 1902 – 5 August 1962), better known by the pseudonym John Willie, was an artist, fetish photographer, cartoonist, specialty shoe designer, and the publisher and editor of the first 20 issues of the fetish magazine Bizarre, featuring his characters Sweet Gwendoline and Sir Dystic d'Arcy.

Though distributed underground, Bizarre magazine had a far-reaching impact on later fetish-themed publications and experienced a resurgence in popularity, along with fetish model Bettie Page, beginning in the 1970s. As noted in John Willie: The Story of John Alexander Scott Coutts, Richard Pérez Seves's definitive biography:

In the realm of 20th-century underground art, John Willie stands as a singular figure whose meticulous artistry and imaginative vision redefined fetish as both a creative and cultural force. More than just an 'erotic artist,' Willie’s work blended fantasy and humor with a refined style that elevated his art beyond mere titillation.

== Early life ==
John Alexander Scott Coutts was born on 9 December 1902 in Straits Settlements, Singapore, then a British colony. Born into wealth, his family relocated to the United Kingdom the following year." Coutts attended Glenalmond, a prestigious boarding school in Scotland, then the Royal Military College, Sandhurst. Commissioned as a Second Lieutenant into the Royal Scots, Coutts was forced to resign in 1925 when he married a night-club dancer, Eveline Stella Frances Fisher, without the permission of his commanding officer. He migrated with his wife to Sydney, Australia in 1926; their marriage, however, ended in divorce in 1930.

In 1934, Coutts met Holly Anna Faram, who became both his wife and artistic muse, marking the beginning of his professional artistic career. Later that year or in early 1935, while in Sydney, Coutts experienced another significant moment when he discovered a shoe store called MacNaughts. There he encountered both ultra-high heels and London Life magazine, followed by meeting a man known as "Achilles," who operated a local High Heel Club for fetishists. It was London Life magazine that provided the inspiration for Bizarre magazine.

== Fetish career ==
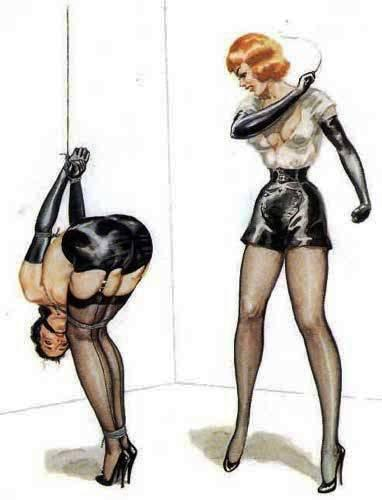
Illustration by Coutts (in Bizarre, under the name "John Willie"), showing a sadomasochistic scene between two women

Coutts initially distributed his photographs through the High Heel Club's mailing list and sold specialty footwear with plans to finance a magazine (which would become Bizarre), though these ventures were interrupted by World War II.

After the war ended, Coutts relocated to North America while Faram remained in Australia. Though he initially sought to settle in New York, immigration complications required him to stay in Montreal, Canada. There, in December 1945, he published the inaugural issue of Bizarre (labeled as "Volume 2"), introducing both his pseudonym "John Willie" and the character Sweet Gwendoline in the same issue.

Once his immigration issues were resolved, Coutts moved to New York City, where he was introduced to the American fetish underground by Charles Guyette. Guyette had a connection with Robert Harrison and it was likely through Guyette that Coutts was introduced to the magazine publisher.

Between June 1947 and February 1950, Harrison published Sweet Gwendoline in his magazine, Wink, and other work by "John Willie." Later, through Guyette's social cirle, Coutts was introduced to Irving Klaw, who would have a significant impact on his career.

Coutts (as "John Willie") drew in a style that influenced later artists such as Gene Bilbrew and Eric Stanton. In fact, Coutts was the inspiration for most of the fetish art produced in the 20th century.

Bizarre was published, at irregular intervals, from 1945 to 1956. Despite the nature of the magazine, Coutts was able to circumvent censorship and orders to cease publication because he was careful to avoid "nudity, homosexuality, overt violence, or obvious depictions of things that might be read as perverse or immoral and that might rankle those parties who were capable of banning, censoring or blocking the magazine's circulation." The magazine included many photographs, often of Willie's wife, and drawings of costume designs, some based on ideas from readers. There were also many letters from readers, covering topics such as high heels, bondage, amputee fetishism, sadomasochism, transvestism, corsets, and body modification.

In 1956, the magazine was sold to his friend R.E.B., who published six more issues.

In early 1957, Coutts would travel to Los Angeles, where he would successfully establish himself as a fetish photographer.

In 1961 he developed a brain tumour and was forced to end his mail-order business. Destroying his archives and returning home to the British Isles, Coutts went to live with his sister who resided on the island of Guernsey. Whilst living with his sister, Coutts died in his sleep on the 5th August 1962.

== Publication elsewhere ==
Willie's work was featured in the Japanese magazine Kitan Club, making him one of few Western artists to have work in it.

== Legacy ==
Willie was portrayed by Jared Harris in the movie The Notorious Bettie Page (2006), which featured a fictional meeting between Willie and Page.

In 2009, Willie was inducted into the Leather Hall of Fame.

== Quotations ==
"Unless a model is a good actress, and has 'that type' of face, it's difficult for her to look sad and miserable when working for me. My studio is a pretty cheerful place, and quite unlike the atmosphere that surrounds Gwendoline when the Countess gets hold of her."

"Bizarre. The magazine for pleasant optimists who frown on convention. The magazine of fashions and fantasies fantastic! Innumerable journals deal with ideas for the majority. Must all sheeplike follow in their wake? Bizarre is for those who have the courage of their own convictions. Conservative? — Old fashioned? — Not by any means! Where does a complete circle begin or end? And doesn't fashion move in a circle? Futuristic? Not even that—there is nothing new in fashion, it is only for the application of new materials—new ornaments—a new process of making—coupled with the taste and ability to create the unusual and unorthodox to the trend of the moment."

"As for sex, ignorance is abysmal, because for centuries those who could not satisfy themselves, except by denying pleasure to others, have taught generation after generation that "sex is taboo." Thou shalt not think about it or discuss it. In fact, it's a dreadful thing, but it's all right as long as you don't enjoy it. If you have any other ideas on the subject, you are a pervert. The basis of a decent society is a happy home. Marriages break up almost invariably because of sex. What you do, or do not do, is your own business, all that matters is that the enjoyment be mutual, — and the time to discuss these things is before you get hitched up. There is a partner to suit everyone somewhere, but the search will be difficult until we can discuss our likes and dislikes, openly, in good taste, without threat from our own brand of standardized Police State."

== See also ==
- Studio Biederer
- Charles Guyette
- Irving Klaw
- Eric Stanton
- Gene Bilbrew
- Bettie Page
- Fetish art
- Fetish artist
