= Shackle (disambiguation) =

A shackle is a device used as a connecting link in rigging systems.

Shackle or Shackles may also refer to:

== Objects and measures ==
- Certain restraint devices, such as handcuffs, legcuffs or thumbcuffs
- As part of a land vehicle, a shackle is a link connecting a leaf spring to the frame
- A nautical unit used for measuring the lengths of the cables and chains (especially anchor chains), equal to 15 fathoms, 90 feet or 27.432 meters.
- USS Shackle (ARS-9), an American ship

== Art and entertainment ==
- "Shackles (Praise You)", a song by Mary Mary
- Shackles (film), a 2005 film
- Shackles or Shakles, the English translation title for the Indonesian novel Belenggu by Armijn Pane

== People with the name ==
- Christopher Shackle (born 1942), English philologist
- G. L. S. Shackle (1903–1992), English economist
- Maud Shackle, English tennis player
- Thomas Shackle, English cricketer
- Thomas Shackle (cricketer, born 1834), English cricketer

== See also ==
- Shackle code
- Shackle Island, Tennessee
- Shackled (disambiguation)
- Shackel
- Shakl
- SHACL
- SHACAL
- Shakal (disambiguation)
- Shekal
