= Rope bondage =

BDSM activity

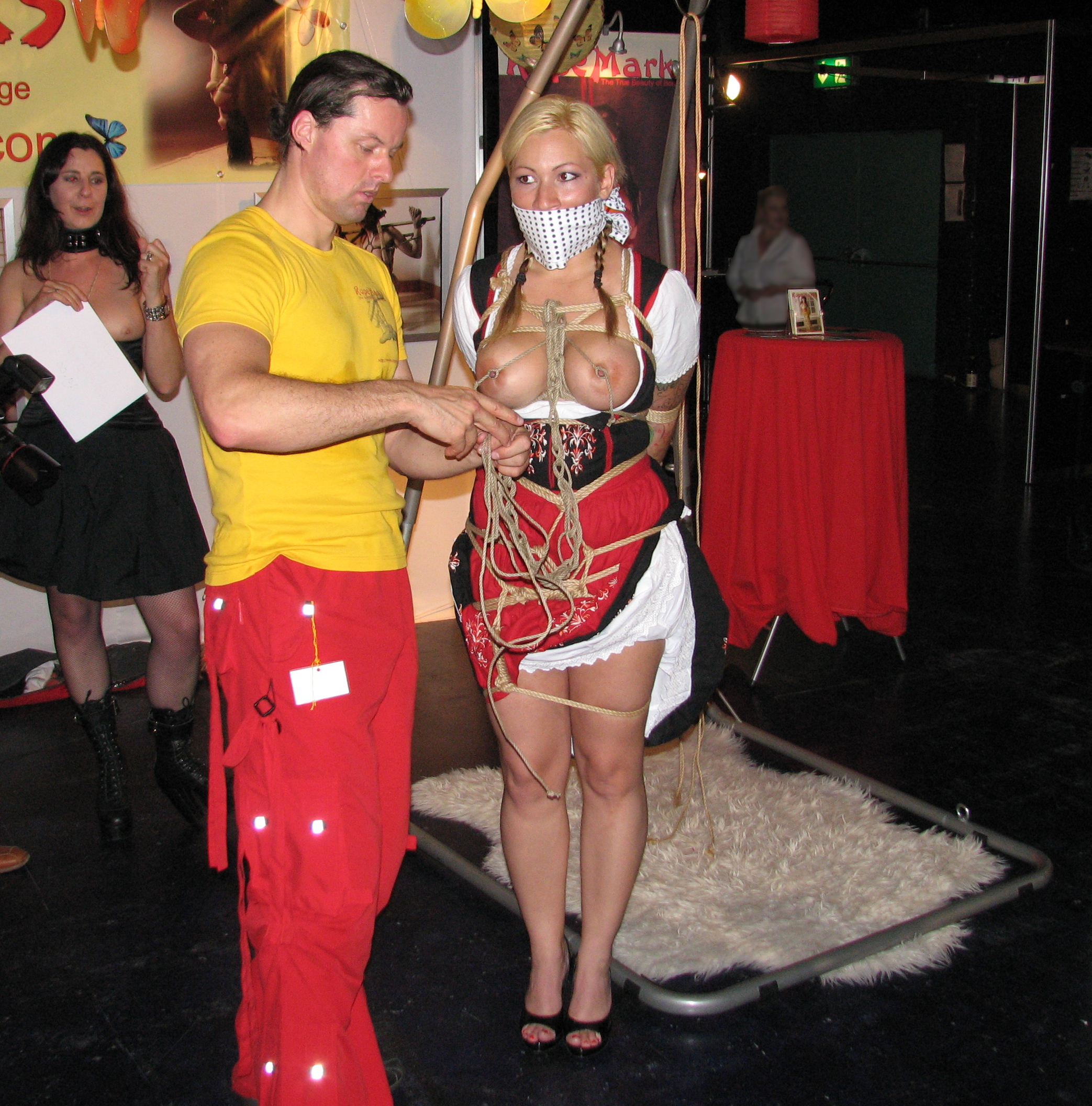
An example of rope bondage at BoundCon, Germany, 2008

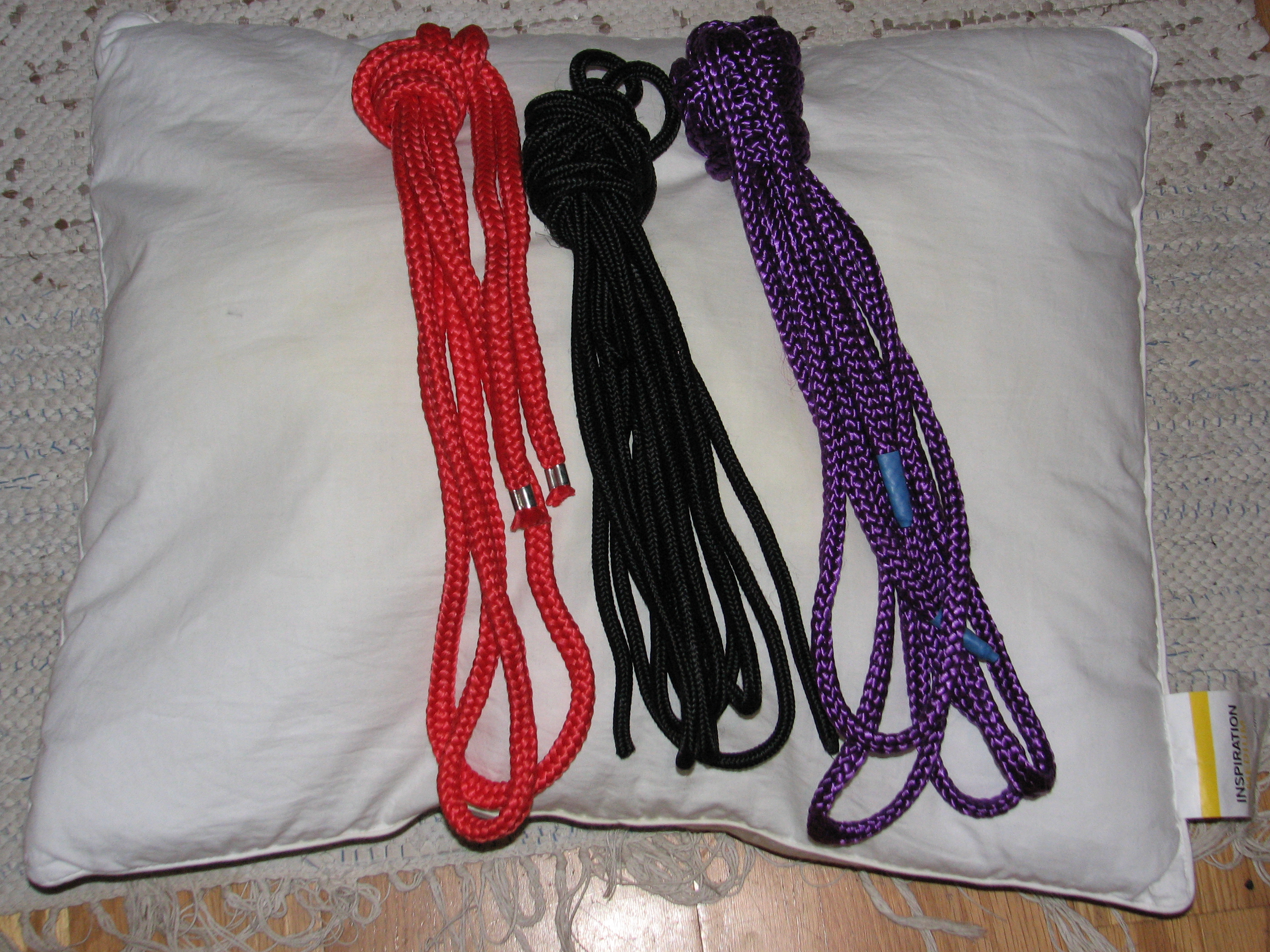
Rope used in erotic bondage is usually soft to avoid chafing the skin, and easy to twist and straighten

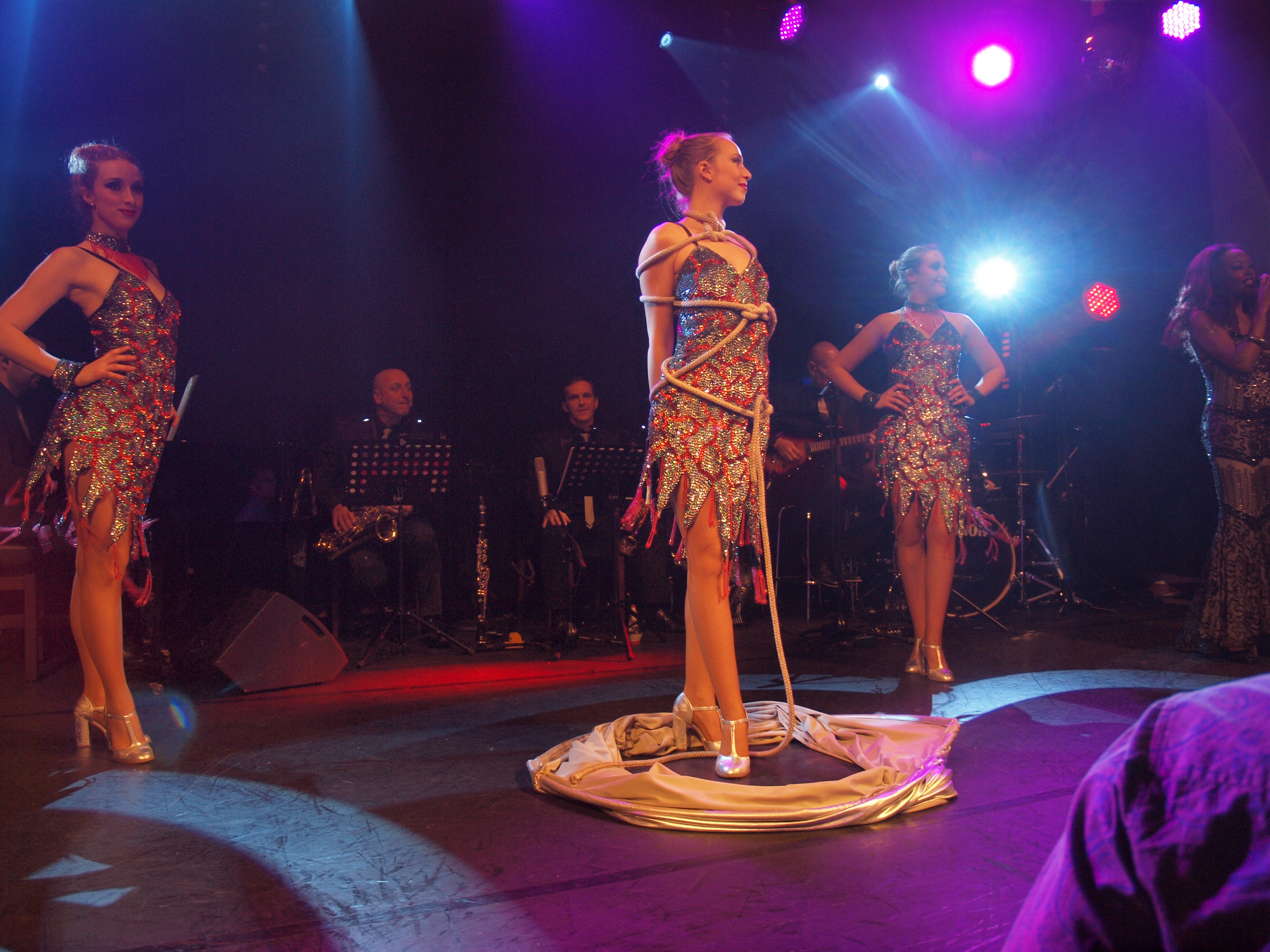
A playful, less restrictive form of rope bondage is a common magic trick at cabaret performances.

Rope bondage, also referred to as rope play, is bondage involving the use of rope to restrict movement, wrap, suspend, or restrain a person, as part of BDSM activities. Japanese bondage, also known as kinbaku or shibari, is the most publicly visible style of rope bondage. An alternative style, "Western bondage" is about achieving restraint; the Japanese style is more concerned with the artistry of the process. String bondage is the wrapping of rows of string around a body area for arousal. String bondage is also known as "constrictions".

== History ==
Rope bondage derives from the erotic Japanese bondage art form of shibari, which was in turn developed from the now-defunct Japanese military restraint technique of hojōjutsu. The rope dress is not of itself a form of restraint, but is used either by itself as an adornment, or incorporated into restraining bondage.

== Materials ==
Bondage ropes used come in a variety of materials and length. Japanese bondage traditionally uses natural fibers such as hemp and jute which are cut into approximately 25 foot (7.6 m) lengths. Western-style bondage typically uses longer ropes that span a wider variety of materials.

- Ropes (typically of a nylon or cotton variety)
- Household furniture

== Techniques ==
A four-poster bed is sometimes used to hold a subject in a spreadeagle position. The wrists and ankles are tied to the bed's vertical columns, thus restraining the arms and legs.

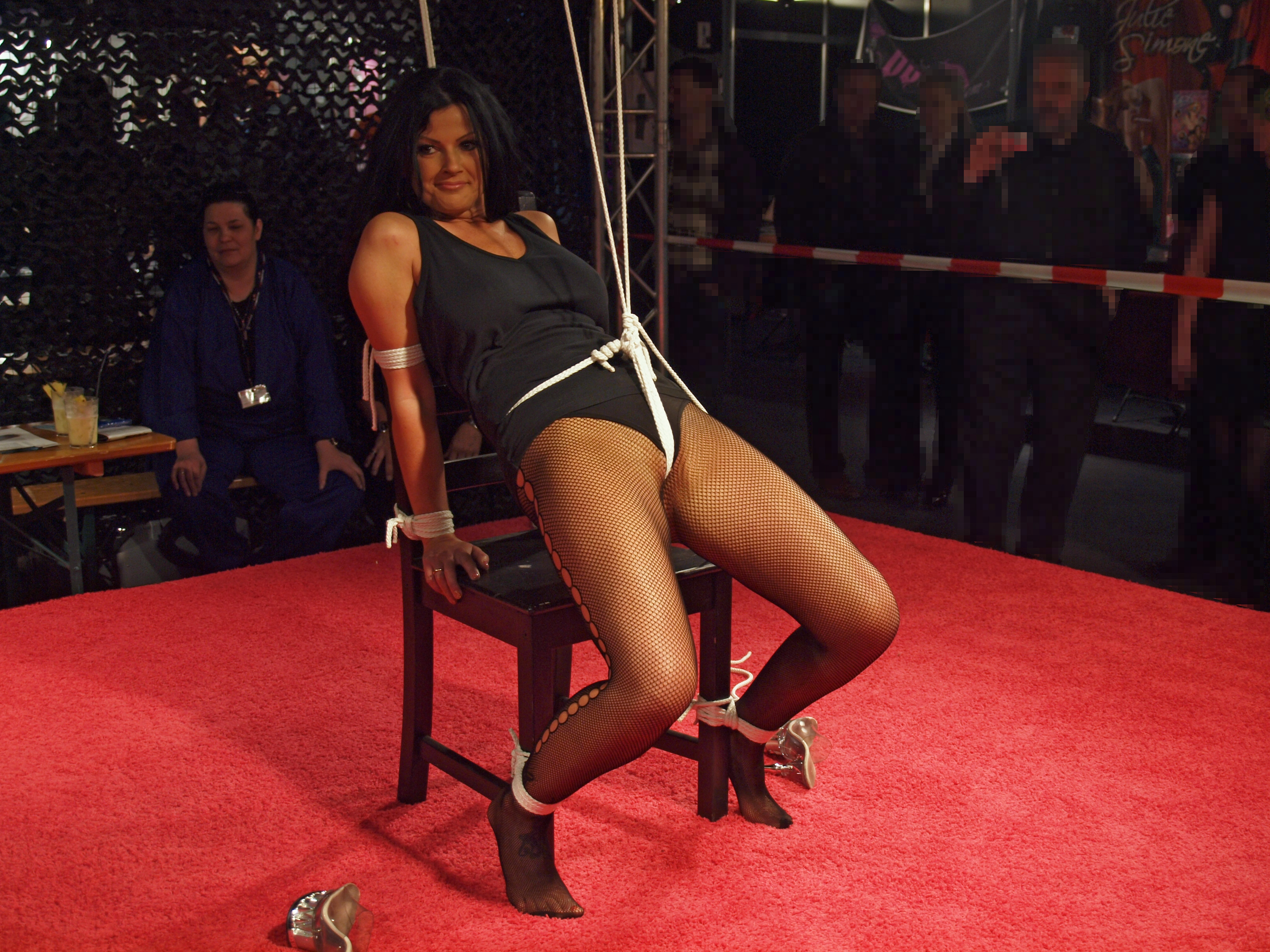
A woman at BoundCon 2013 tied to a chair by her arms and ankles. She is also tied with a crotch rope.

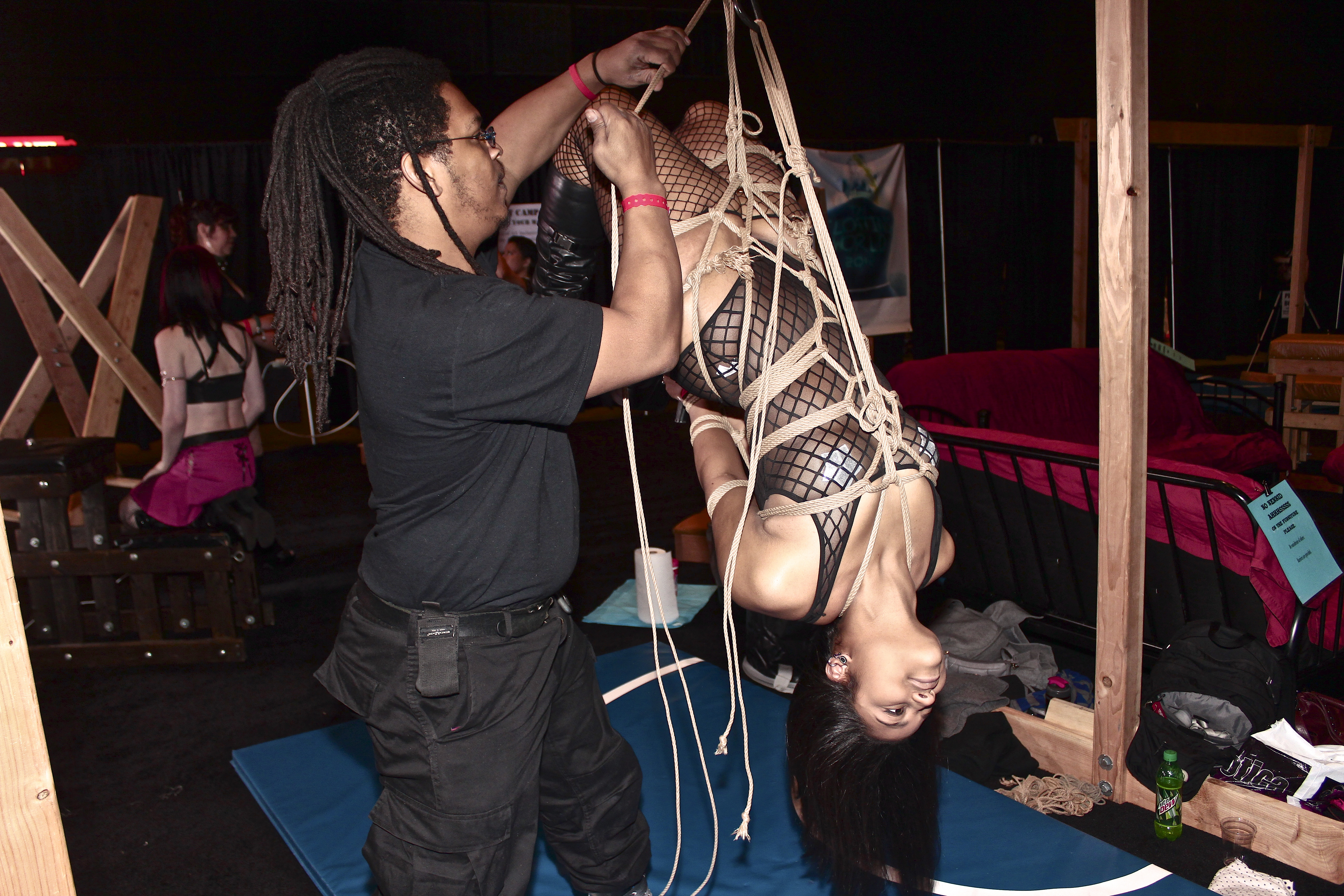
An example of suspension bondage at the Exxxotica Expo in 2013

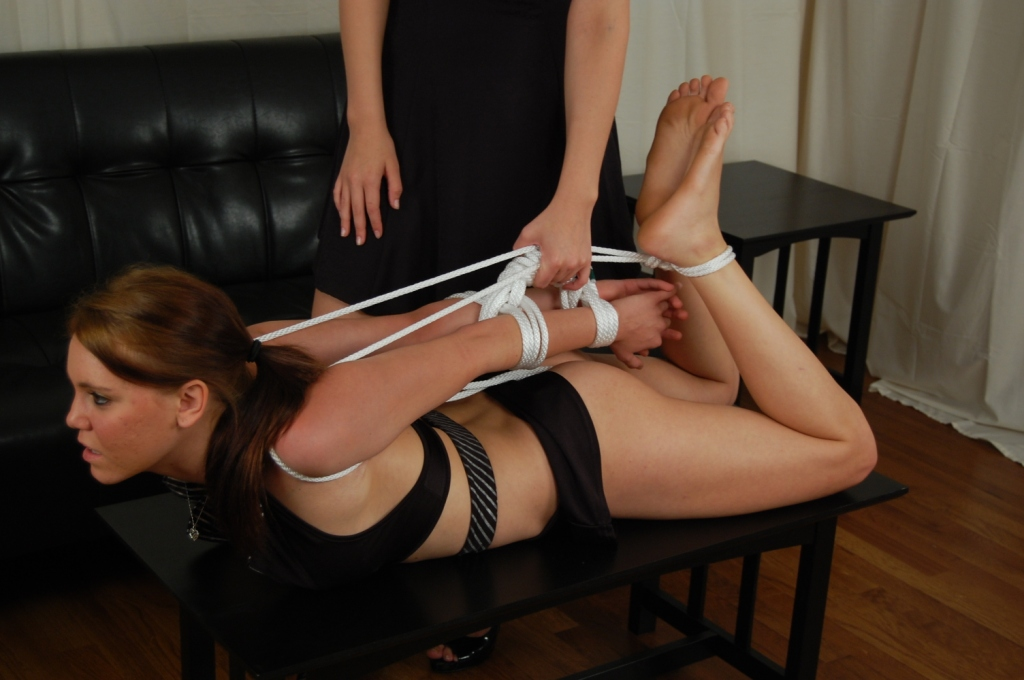
A woman who has been hogtied. She rests on her stomach and is tied at the wrists and ankles with all four joints converging together.

== See also ==
- Erotic furniture
- Human furniture
