= Bondage cuffs =

Restraints used for BDSM

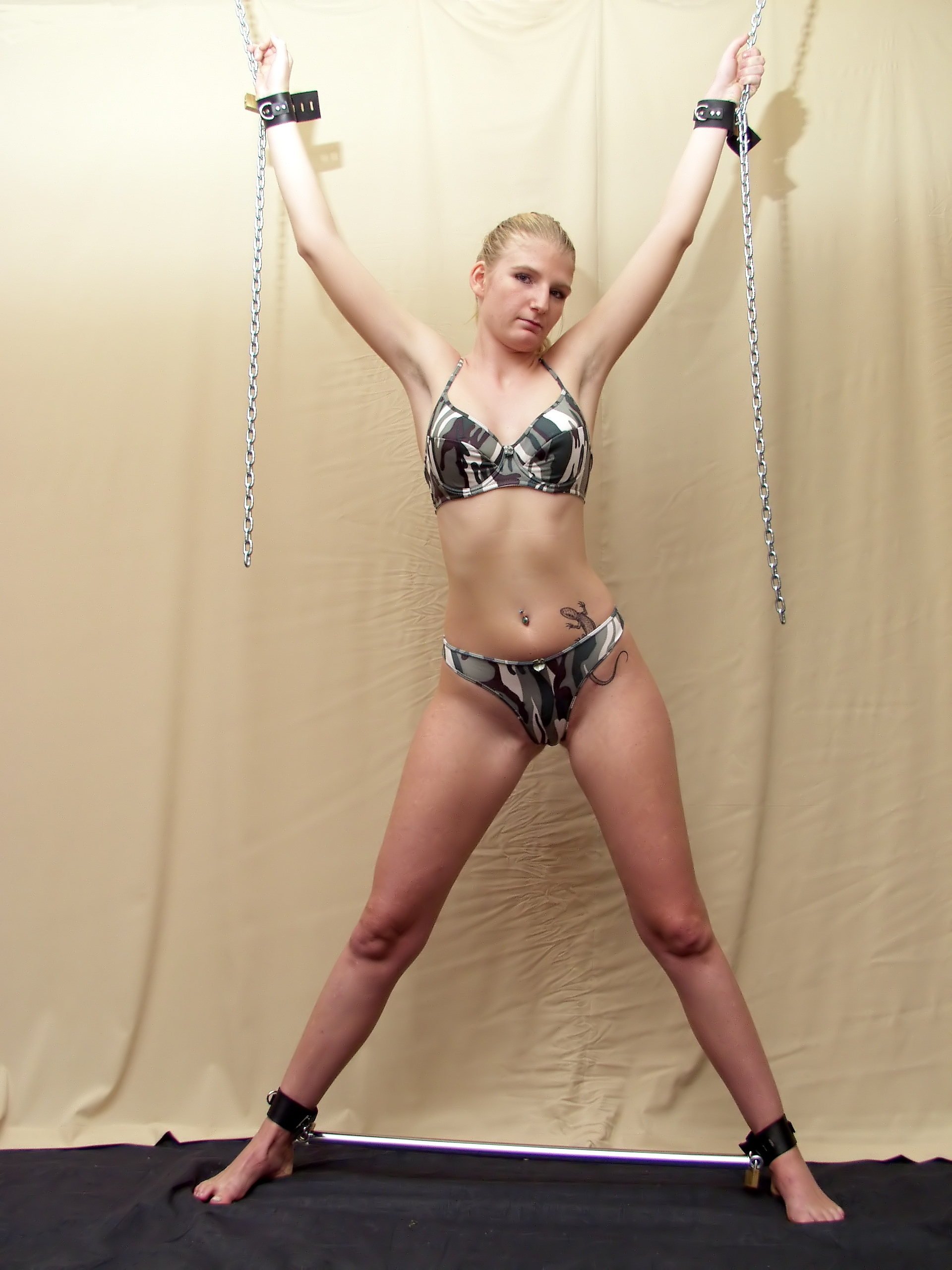
A model bound with bondage cuffs at wrists and a spreader bar at the ankles.

Bondage cuffs are restraints designed for use in sexual bondage situations. Compared to conventional handcuffs, they are wide wrist and ankle restraints generally made of leather, often padded with soft leather or fake fur. Bondage cuffs may be fastened at the wrists and/or ankles by a locking mechanism, by a buckle or by velcro. They are secured around the wrist or ankle, and the cuffs may then be attached to each other or another object.

They may be fitted with D-ring attachments or buckles to which nylon webbing, chain rather another restraining strap may be attached. The straps may have a loop mechanism to allow the tightening of the straps.

Bondage cuffs are typically secured to each wrist and ankle, and to each other and other objects depending on the needs of each play. A set of cuffs may be used to create a hogtie, and a pair of ankle cuffs can be used together with thigh-width straps to create a frogtie. They are typically used in conjunction with other bondage equipment, such as leg spreader bars.

== Safety considerations ==
Bondage cuffs are designed to be safer than conventional handcuffs. Unlike bondage cuffs, the primary design goals of handcuffs are not comfort and safety, but immobilization and prevention of escape, and they are not padded to try to reduce the risk of nerve damage and other injuries. Nevertheless, as with all restraint devices, it is still possible for the use of bondage cuffs to cause serious injuries if misused or not monitored carefully.

Ordinary bondage cuffs are not designed to be safe when used to carry any significant load. Suspension cuffs are a specialized form of bondage cuffs, designed to be used to suspend the body during suspension bondage.

== Gallery ==
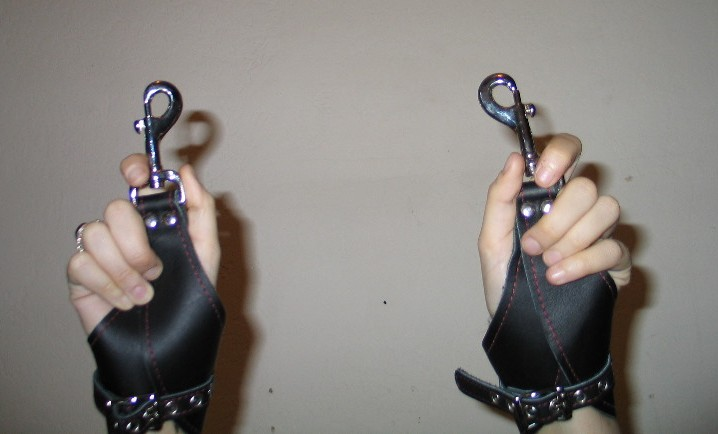
Wrists encased in suspension cuffs.

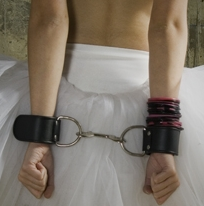
Hands restrained behind back using bondage cuffs.

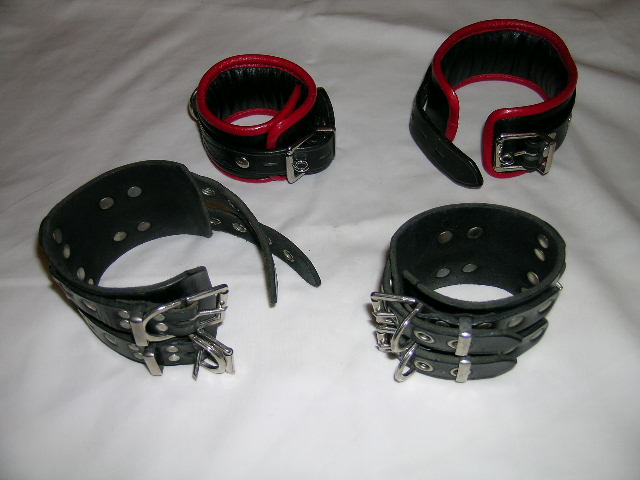
An assortment of bondage cuffs with buckles.

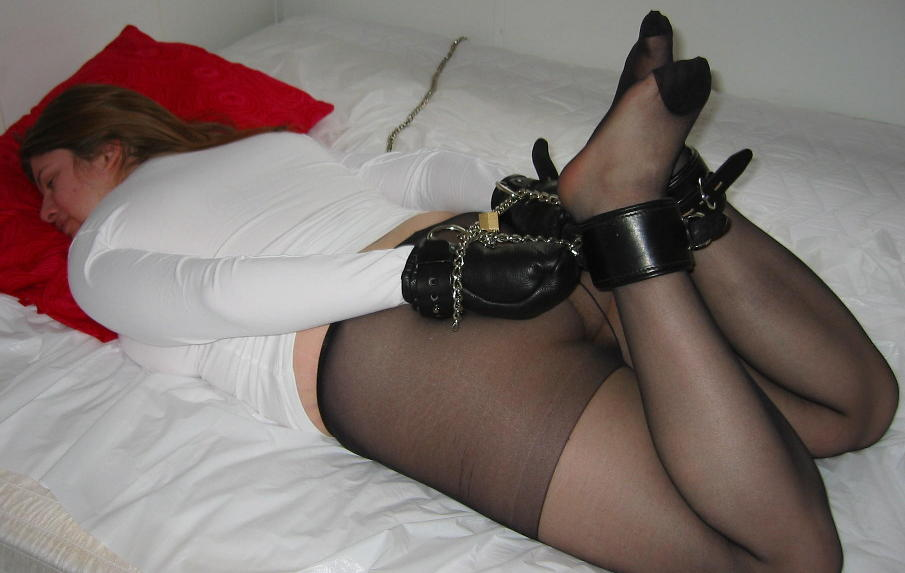
Hogtie with bondage cuffs on ankles.

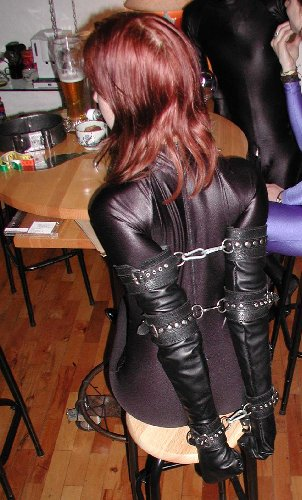
An armbinder consisting of cuffs and bondage mittens.

== See also ==
- BDSM
- Bondage positions and methods
- Collars in BDSM
- Legcuffs
- Thumbcuffs
