= Shackled =

Shackled may refer to:

- Shackled (1918 film), a silent American film
- Shackled (2012 British film), a short British film
- Shackled (2012 Indonesian film), an Indonesian horror film

== See also ==
- Shackle (disambiguation)
- "Shackled and Drawn", a track from Wrecking Ball (Bruce Springsteen album)
- Shackled City, a role-playing game Adventure Path designed for Dungeons & Dragons
