= Predicament bondage =

BDSM activity

A woman in predicament bondage - she is forced to uncomfortably stand on her toes to prevent the metallic hook from inserting further into her vagina

Predicament bondage is a form of bondage in which a person is restrained and forced to experience opposing sensory forces. The default position is typically intended to cause muscle fatigue, such as standing on tiptoe, which forces the subject to choose a more physically painful position. For example, they may let themselves lower their weight and stand while forcing a rope to pull and painfully stretch their genitals. Predicament bondage can also involve the use of a single position in which remaining still will not cause any discomfort for the subject, but moving their body will pull on ropes, weights or other devices meant to cause them pain, or refer to not allowing the subject knowledge of how to escape, even if escape is possible or making the process of escape undesirable, such as forcing them to expose themselves publicly. The subject may then be tickled, sexually stimulated, or otherwise enticed to move uncontrollably.

When performed with multiple submissive participants, a predicament bondage scenario may force one to choose a position that causes pain to the other whom they know and love. The dilemma of being able to spare a loved one pain by submitting to pain, or sparing oneself from pain by submitting another to it, is used in BDSM and master/slave play.

== See also ==
- Bondage positions and methods
- Edgeplay
- Stress position
- Limits (BDSM)
- Risk-aware consensual kink
