= Suspension bondage =

Rope bondage in which the rope bottom is suspended in the air

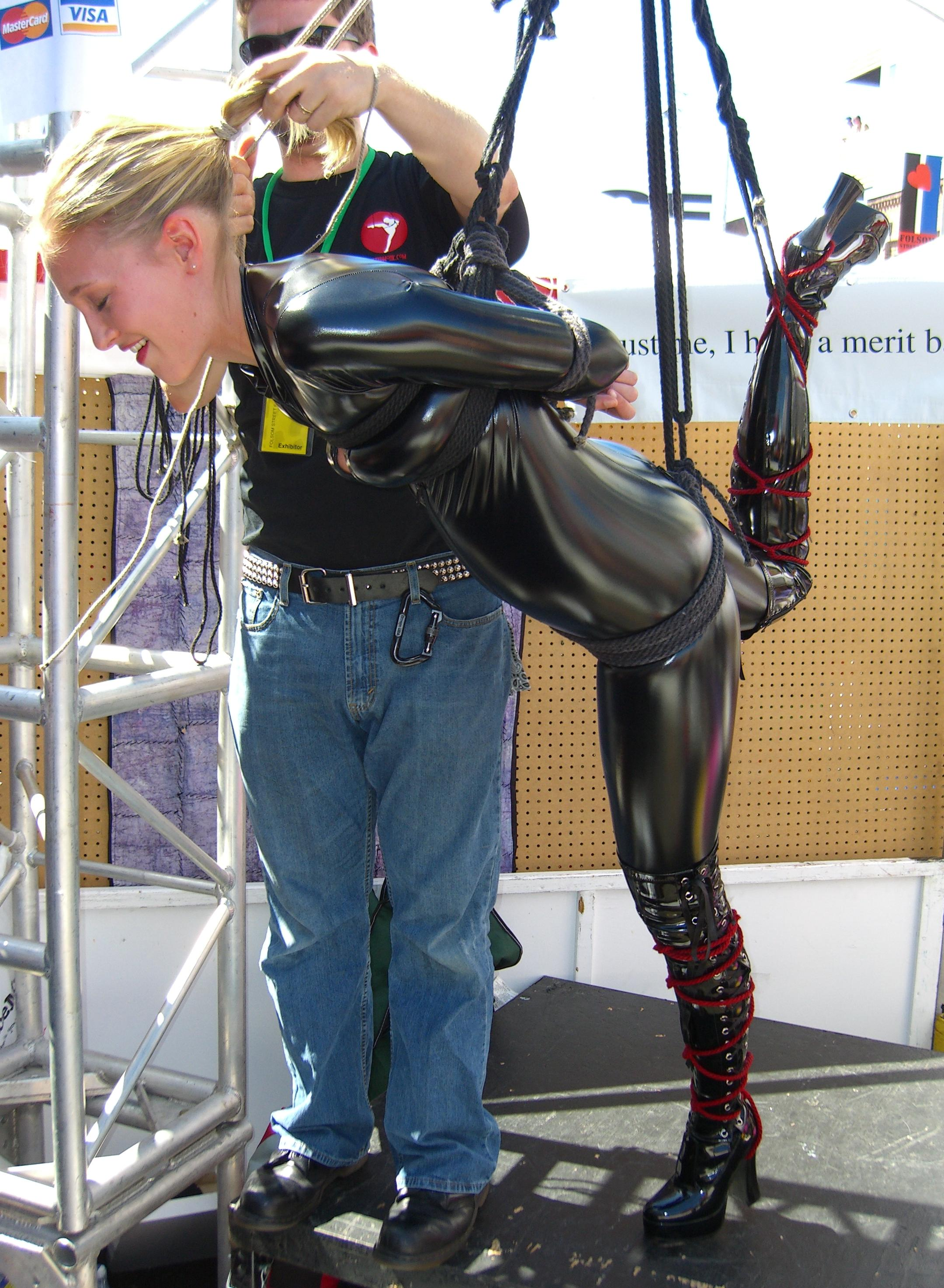
This bondage demonstration during Folsom Street Fair 2005 is a shibari style partial suspension.

Suspension bondage is a form of sexual bondage where a bound person is hung from one or more overhead suspension points. It carries a higher risk than other forms of sexual bondage.

== Stimulation ==
In partial suspension, the person is bound in a way that part of their body weight is held by suspension ropes, cables or chains. The classic partial suspension position is to have the person balancing on one foot with part of their weight supported through a chest harness and the other leg pulled up in some direction. A person lying on their upper back with legs tied upwards to a suspension point to pull their lower back off the ground would also qualify as partial suspension.

In full suspension, the person is completely supported by suspension ropes, cables or chains, and they have no contact with the ground. The position of the person's body in a full suspension is only limited by their endurance and the skill of the binder.

The main effect of suspension bondage is to create a heightened sense of vulnerability and inescapability, so that the subject is made to feel that by attempting to free themselves, they may fall and hurt themselves. This is meant to create a form of mental bondage. Being suspended, especially in a large open space, also creates a sense of objectification, submissiveness and erotic helplessness for the subject, which can be erotically stimulating for them and for those observing them. Rope suspension is sometimes done as performance art at BDSM conventions and fetish-themed nightclubs.

Suspension can alternatively create a sense of liberation in that one can glide around the room, and some styles of rigging are optimal for the suspendee to have control over their spin rate, body position, and general activities. Trance-like states are also common, resulting alternatively or simultaneously from the sensations of anti-gravity, the heightened awareness of one's body, and the sacrifice of one's natural physical strengths.

Self-induced suspension bondage may involve autoerotic asphyxia.

== Three main positions ==
The three main suspension positions are vertical, horizontal and inverted.

=== Vertical suspension ===
This primarily involves the person being lifted from the ground by their wrists. This is usually achieved by use of rope or by special suspension cuffs. When using rope, extreme damage can be caused to the soft tissues of the wrists, as well as reducing circulation, so being suspended by ropes can only normally be achieved for a very short period of time. Often in fiction and movies a person may be pictured hanging from metal cuffs or handcuffs. This is possible, although extremely painful and will leave deep marks in the wrists. The safest and "most comfortable" method of suspension by the wrists is to use suspension cuffs as they are specifically designed to spread the weight around the wrist as much as possible.

An alternative method of vertical suspension is to use a bondage rope harness. With the ropes tied around the body and in particular around the upper arms close to the shoulders as well as around the upper leg and through the groin, it is possible to suspend a person with ropes attached to these areas similar to the way a parachute is attached to a person. In this position the arms and legs may be left to hang free, as the person would have great difficulty getting free without assistance.

=== Horizontal suspension ===
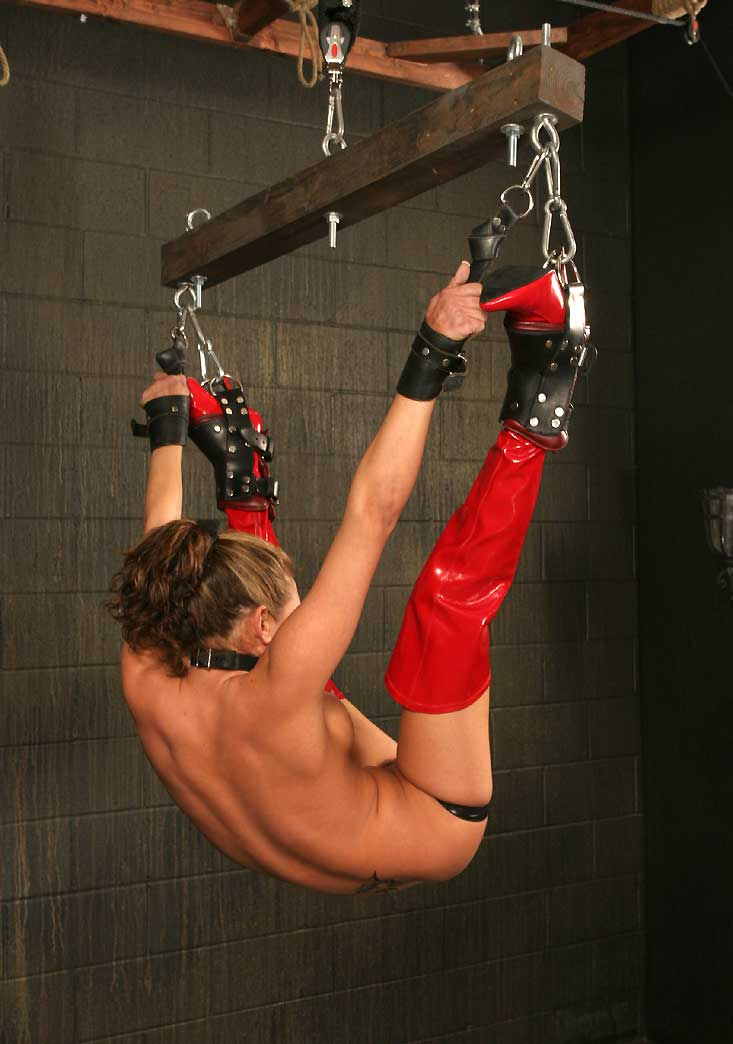
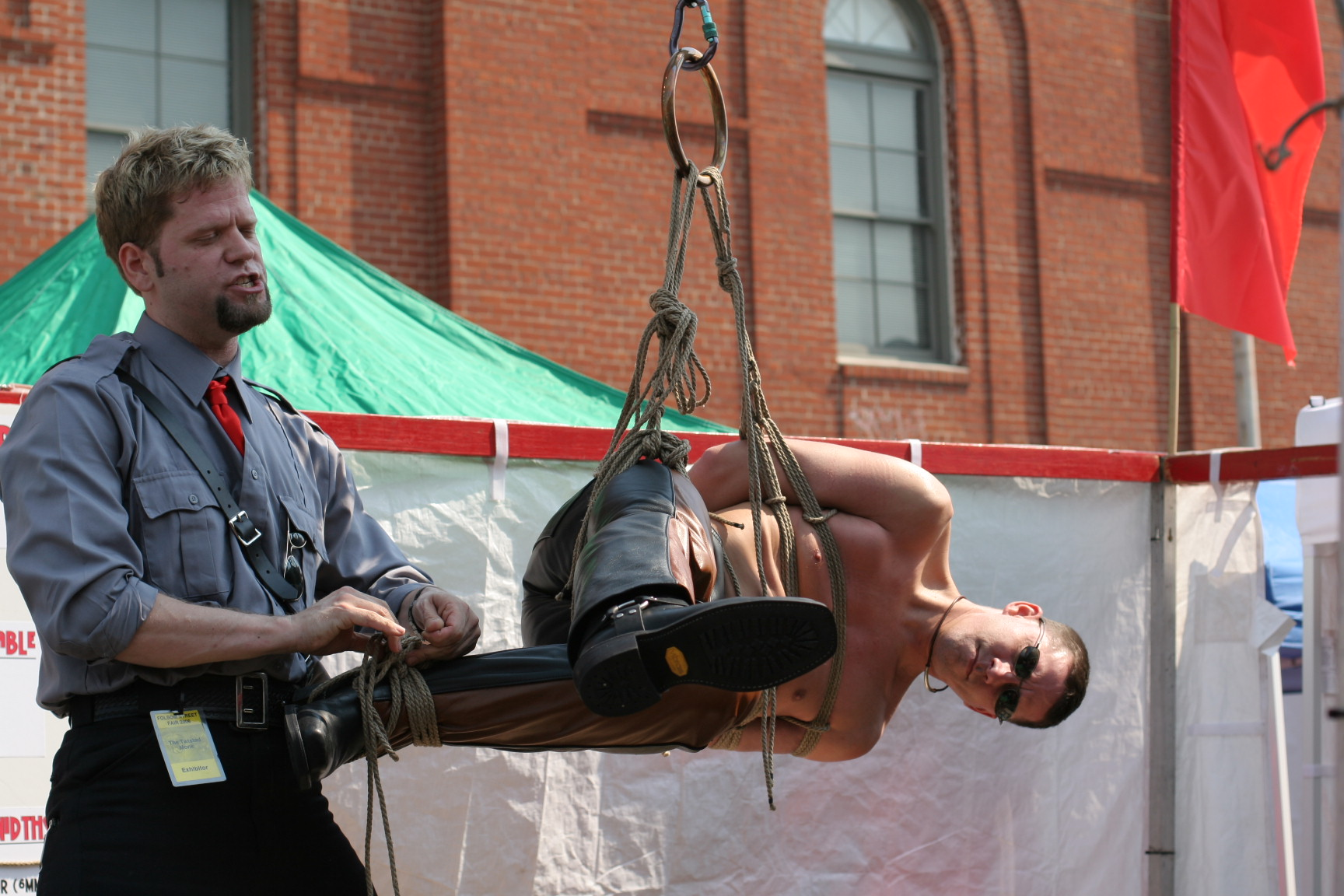
Left: Horizontal suspension, face up.
Right: A man in bondage hanging horizontally at the Folsom Street Fair in 2006.

The horizontal suspension position has the subject bound in a horizontal position, sometimes face up but usually face down. The body is lifted into this position either by attaching bondage equipment to the wrists and ankles, or to other areas of the body, or a mixture of both, with the subject's weight born by these areas. The ankles or wrists may be brought together or kept apart by a spreader bar. In case of the wrists and ankles, ropes or suspension cuffs can be used. When the body itself is used to suspend the person, they may first be tied into a conventional bondage position such as a hogtie or ball tie, then by attaching ropes or chains to ropes under areas of the body able to take weight the person is lifted into the air.

A variation on this position is to secure the wrists to either the spreader bar or to a securing point between their ankles forming a hogtie, resulting in what is called a suspension bow. In this position, if the subject is a female and facing down, her breasts would be pointing almost straight down depending on the strictness of the position, and nipple clamps and weights can be added for painful stimulation. The clamps may alternatively be secured to a point on the floor, limiting the subject's ability to struggle or move at all without causing pain.

=== Inverted suspension ===
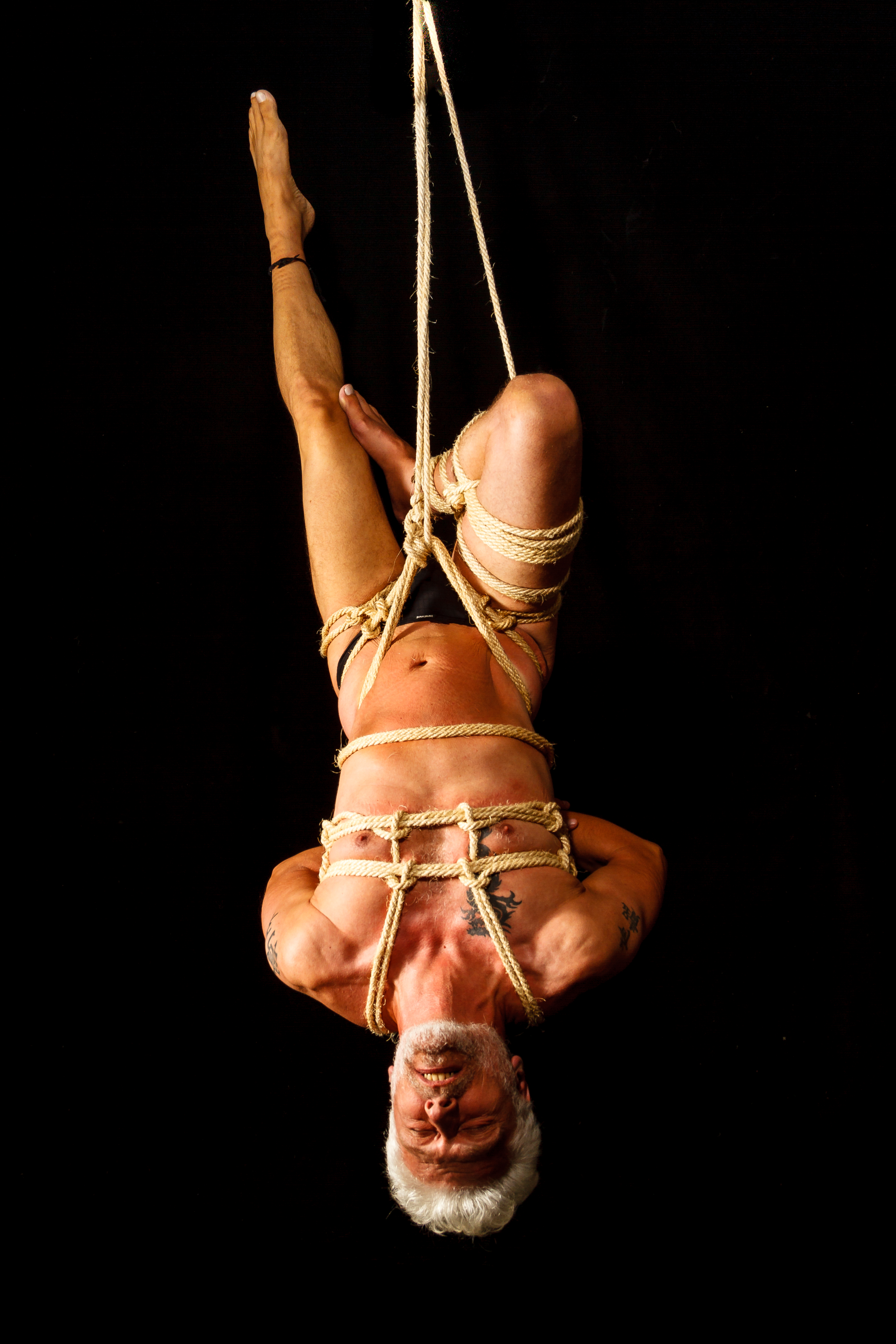
A man hanging in inverted suspension using ropes.

Being suspended upside down can be a very hard position to maintain as a result of the position causing the blood to rush to the head. This means that this position probably cannot be maintained for any length of time. To be suspended in this position, ropes or suspension cuffs are used to lift the person into the air by their ankles.

Unlike when a person is suspended by their wrists, rope suspension around the ankles can be maintained for much longer as the ankle region naturally is able to take far more weight and stress than the wrists. This is especially so if boots are used as the ropes can run around the outside surface of the boot thus protecting the skin from damage. The person may be suspended with their legs together, or held apart either by using a spreader bar or by securing the ankles to two separate locations. With the legs held in this position, the subject may have an increased sense of vulnerability as their genital region would be easily accessible.

== Risks ==
The risks of rope suspension rank up there with heavy breath play. Heck, rope suspensions can turn into heavy breath play scenes if not careful.

— Midori, Thoughts on Rope Suspension

The danger most often associated with suspension bondage, over and above the usual risks inherent in bondage, is falling; whether due to a weak suspension point, faulty equipment or poor technique. Inverted positions are especially hazardous in this regard since a head-first fall of only a few inches can kill or paralyze a person. Less obvious dangers include nerve compression and resulting damage, circulation problems and fainting, and the recently recognized harness hang syndrome. Harness hang syndrome appears to relate to suspension with the legs below the heart, as in the case when someone is suspended in a standing position, with no weight on their legs. Extracting a person safely out of suspension bondage can be difficult if they are unconscious, or if a winch or hoist jams. Suspension tops will often work with spotters who can help get the person down in an emergency.

== Experts ==
Suspension bondage is a difficult subject to find information on. While many famous riggers regularly perform suspensions, they have expressed hesitation in committing such knowledge for dissemination, due to the increased risk of injury to amateurs attempting to imitate without enough prior research or practice. Although most suspension bondage educational material is found on the Internet, there are books available on the topic.

== See also ==
- Suspension (body modification)
