= Shackell =

Shackell is a surname. Notable people with the surname include:

- Aaron Shackell (born 2004), American swimmer
- Alex Shackell (born 2006), American swimmer
- James Shackell (1833–1899), Australian politician
- Jason Shackell, English footballer
- Keith Shackell, British rower
- Nicholas Shackell (born 1974), British swimmer

== See also ==
- Shackell Bobb, Vincentian lawyer
- Shackel
