= Nipple clamp =

Sex toy

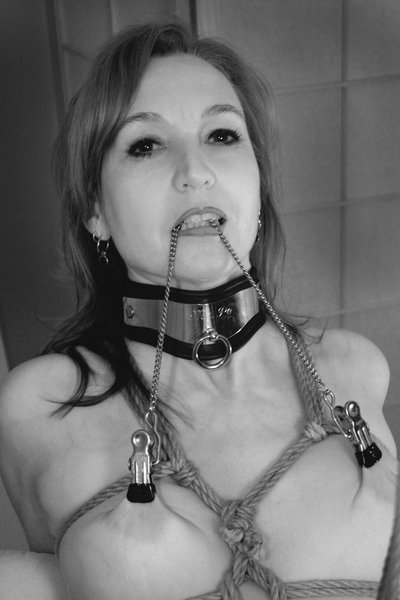
A model wearing two nipple clamps joined by a chain. The chain is held in the model's mouth to pull the nipples upwards.

A nipple clamp is a type of sex toy that is applied to a person's nipples to pinch them. Varieties of nipple clamp include clothes-pin-style, tweezer and clover. Nipple clamps are used to cause pain in the nipples as part of certain BDSM activities. They are also used to produce erotic stimulation as part of nipple play. In this context they are not primarily used to produce pain but rather to increase nipple sensation. Their use traps blood in the nipples, increasing the sensitivity of the nipple. The sexologist Carol Queen says that "clamps are also very useful for hands-free nipple play".

The first literary depiction of the nipple clamp was in 1790, in the novel Justine by the French writer Marquis de Sade.

Forceps are also sometimes used as nipple clamps to facilitate nipple piercing.

== Technique ==
As the nipples are an erogenous zone, nipple clamps can be used to heighten sensation and may lead to orgasm. BDSM practices, such as the use of a safeword, are often employed when nipple clamps are used. Before the clamps are applied, the nipples are typically stimulated manually or orally to prepare them. Pulling on the nipples to elongate them makes it easier to attach the clamps. Once the nipples are erect they are held taut and the "jaws" of the clamps are closed slowly, usually on the base of the nipples where they meet the areolae as this area is less sensitive than the tip. The technique for ensuring a firm grip on the nipples varies depending on their size. Small nipples are often clamped along with part of the areolae, while large nipples are sometimes clamped without first being erected. Subsequently, the tension is increased, and this is often accompanied by additional manual or oral stimulation.

For safety reasons the length of time for which nipple clamps are worn is limited. Bruising and soreness can result if they are used for more than 10 minutes at a time. If the blood circulation to the nipple is cut for too long there is also a risk of damage to the tissue and nerves. Changes in skin colour can be used to determine the level of blood flow, which needs to be re-established regularly to prevent any permanent damage. When the clamps are removed, the restricted blood flow rushes back into the nipples and releases oxytocin, a hormone associated with orgasm. This can make skin sensations more intense and pleasurable. The restriction and reintroduction of blood flow into the nipples can be painful, and this is used as part of some BDSM activities such as breast torture.

Nipple clamps are also be used in BDSM for predicament bondage. They can be connected to a secondary attachment point such as a hook on a wall or a piece of furniture so that the wearer is unable to move without pulling on their nipples. To avoid this they have to remain in a position that is uncomfortable or in which they can be tickled or tortured. Similarly, nipple clamps can be attached to a leash, allowing the wearer to be led by their clamps.

After the clamps are removed, it is common to soothe the nipples with ice, lotion, or aloe.

== Design variations ==
Different kinds of nipple clamps can produce different sensations and intensities. The area covered by the clamps affects the experience, with some clamps being more or less suitable for individuals with different sized nipples. Carol Queen says: "Some clamps cover a wider surface area and might be preferred by people with bigger nipples... Thin or small tips on clamps focus the pressure down to one small spot instead of spreading it out." Heavy clamps or additional weights can be used to pull on the nipples, resulting in a tugging sensation which can give additional stimulation and pleasure. A number of designs are commercially produced, including clothes-pin-style clamps, tweezer clamps and butterfly clamps. Some have additional features, such as extra weights or built-in vibrators. Some modern versions connect to a smartphone via Bluetooth and are controlled by a mobile app so that their vibration and pressure can be controlled remotely. Nipple clamp designs differ with regard to how easy they are to attach and how long they stay on without slipping off.

Nipple clamps can be applied to pierced nipples once the piercings have fully healed. Clamps specifically designed for pierced nipples can be attached directly to the piercings or applied behind them. Nipple clamps are typically used in pairs and are sometimes connected by a chain. Both nipples are tugged simultaneously if the chain is pulled. A second chain attached midway along the first may be connected to a clit clamp attached to the clitoris or onto a cock ring.

=== Clothes-pin style ===
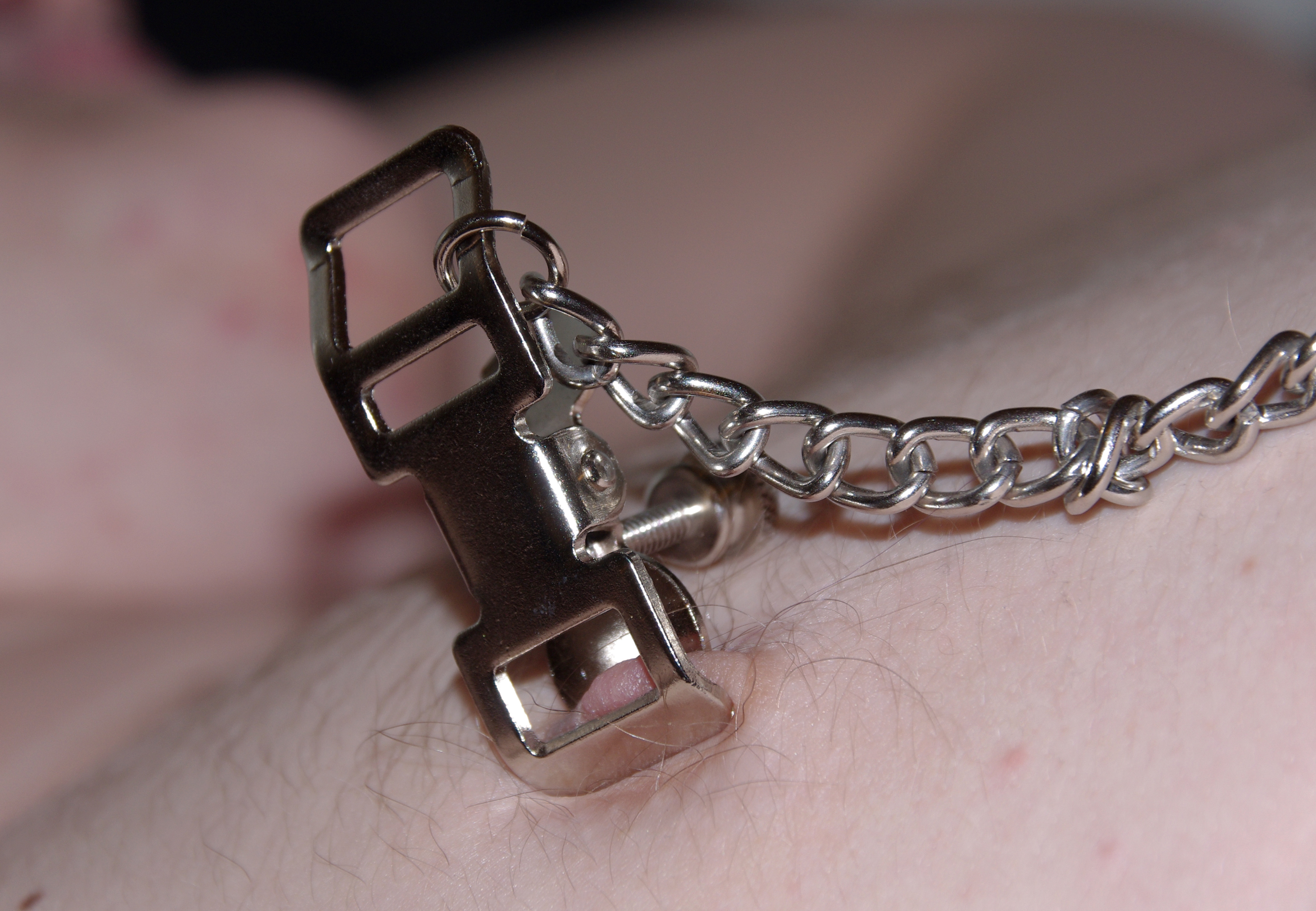
Clothespin-style clamps in use. The screw is used to adjust the pressure.

A clothes-pin style or alligator clamp works like a common household clothes-pin. It has two short lengths of metal, joined by a spring to keep one end closed; in its simplest form, it is made of a crocodile clip. Its serrated jaws are usually covered with removable rubber sheaths to protect the nipple from damage and to reduce pain. This type often comes with screws to adjust the pressure. It can produce a high intensity of sensation, especially if it has teeth, and is mostly used by experienced users.

=== Tweezer clamp ===
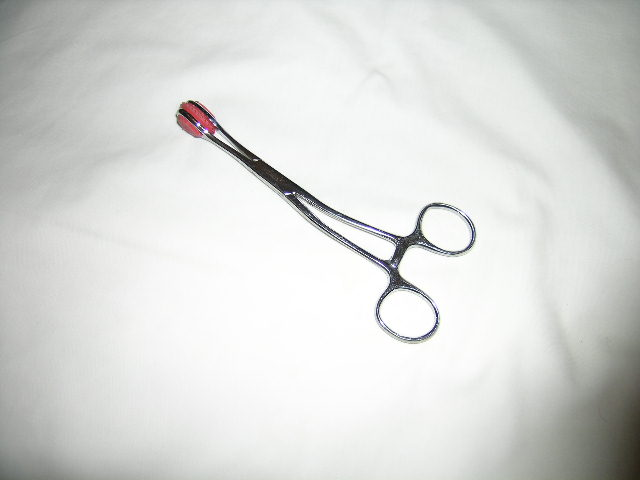
Tweezer type of Nipple clamp

A tweezer clamp looks like a pair of regular tweezers. It consists of two short lengths of metal, no more than 5–10 centimetres (2–4 in) in length, fixed together at one end and open at the other end. The open ends are curved slightly to improve their ability to grip the nipple.

These clamps are lightweight and adjustable and their starting pressure is mild, making them suitable for beginners. They are one of the most popular types of nipple clamp on sale. Typically, they have small 1 centimetre (0.4 in) rubber sheaths over the open ends for comfort, to protect the nipple from damage and to reduce slippage. A small ring wraps around the two pieces of metal and is used to adjust the tension.

The user places the two sides of the metal head on either side of the nipple, then by sliding the ring along the clamp shaft towards the nipple, causes the two halves to close tighter together. Tension can thus be adjusted depending on the location of the ring — the closer the ring is along the shaft toward the nipple, the tighter the clamp.

=== Clover clamp ===
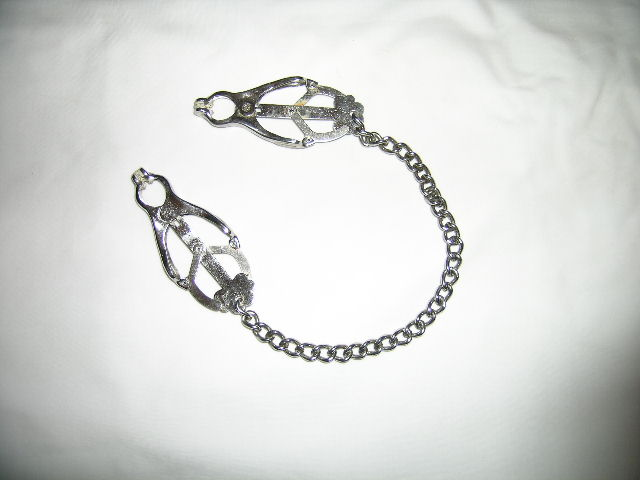
Clover clamps

The clover clamp, also referred to as "butterfly clamp" or "bird clamp", is of Japanese origin and was designed for clamping sails or sewing fabric. The clamp is flat, about 4 inches (10 cm) long and 2 inches (5 cm) wide, and has an eyelet to which a chain or cord can be attached. If this is pulled a mechanism inside the clamp moves the jaws closer together and provides increasing tension. When they are applied to the nipples a spring hinge holds them in place under tension and provides a very high pain level. They are used for nipple torture in the BDSM community. To increase the tension on the nipples, small weights are sometimes attached to the clamps or the chain. These can be weights designed specifically for this purpose, or weights such as fishing sinkers can be used. Another use for the clamps is to keep a person in one place. If a cord is tied from the clamp to a fixed place, the wearer of the clamps cannot move away because the clamps will tighten as they move. This technique can be used for predicament bondage. The removal of the clamps is also painful and different methods of removal can increase or decrease this pain.

These clamps have small points of contact and hence their pinch is usually painful, especially on people with larger nipples. They are usually only used by more experienced users for the purposes of edging, orgasm denial or nipple torture. They produce sexual pleasure

=== Magnetic clamp ===
A magnetic clamp pinches the nipple between two strong magnets. The pressure applied cannot be varied in the way that it can using adjustable clamps. Magnetic clamps typically produce a high level of pain akin to clover clamps and are more suitable for experienced wearers.

== See also ==
- Breast bondage
