= Armbinder =

Bondage restraint that restrains arms behind back

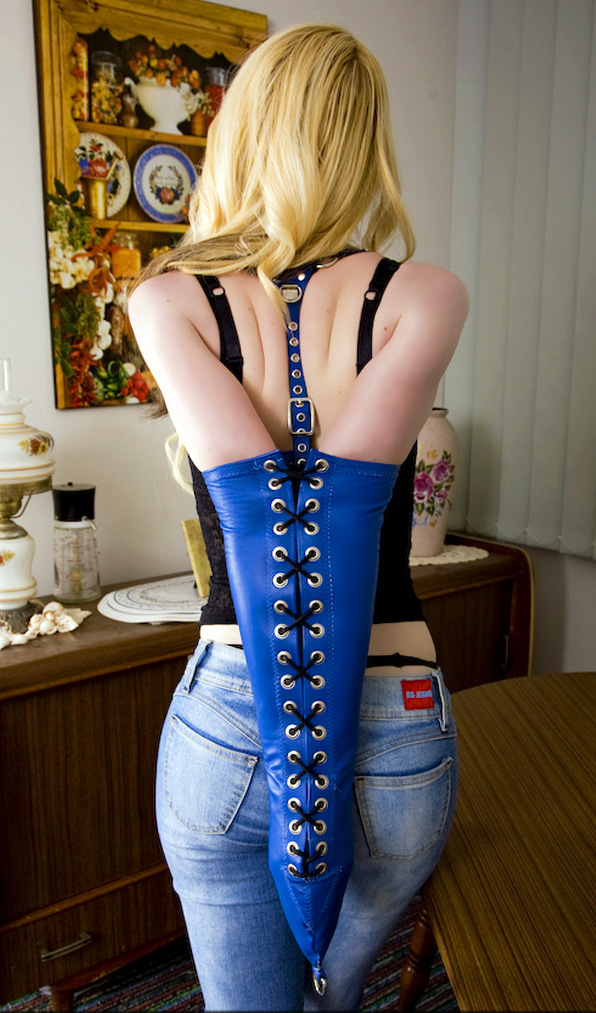
A monoglove with a Y-shaped harness configuration.

An armbinder or monoglove is a type of restraint device primarily used in bondage play (rather than law enforcement, medicine, or psychiatry), designed to bind the arms and/or hands to each other or to the body, usually behind the back, and employing a range of bondage equipment including cuffs, rods, straps, and gloves.

One type of armbinder is the monoglove.

== Single glove sheath ==
A common form of armbinder consists of a sheath, roughly conical, that encloses both of the wearer's arms from fingertips to above the elbow, holding them together behind the back, combined with one of various harness (straps) arrangements to hold it in place. The sheath is commonly of latex or leather which itself typically covers the arms from the fingertips to above the elbows, and is closed and tightened with a zipper, lacing, or sometimes both; the sheath is frequently supplemented with straps around the wrists and the elbows or upper arms. The sheath alone is ineffective without a harness to keep it from slipping down the arms; the most common harness is a pair of straps that join to the outer top of the sheath, run over the shoulders and under the armpits, and join again at the inner top of the sheath. The straps are usually crossed, behind the neck or across the upper chest, to prevent the straps from slipping off the shoulders. The latter position can cause problems if the straps tend to ride up and press on the wearer's throat. Left strap is brought from under left armpit, brought over right shoulder and then buckled up behind the neck. The same is done with the right strap and then both right and left strap are buckled together to prevent falling of armbinder. Due to this armbinder, elbows are kept in touch with each other for a long time which can cause injury if kept for a very long time.

== Monoglove variation ==
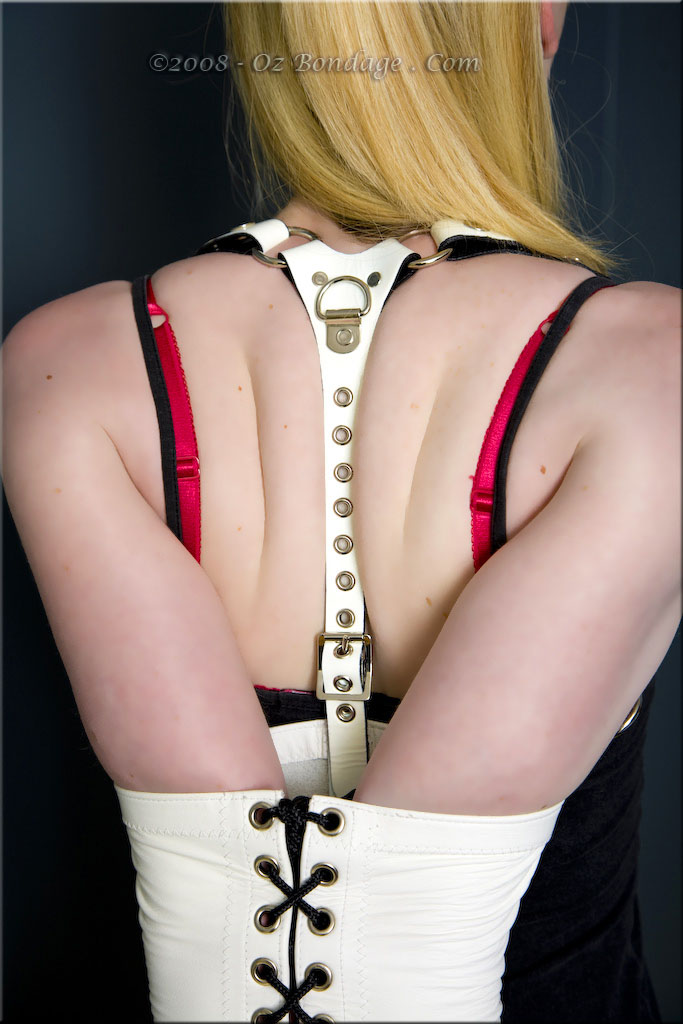
Image shows "John Willie" style of monoglove. Note the reduced circulation in arms due to tightness.

While various forms of armbinder are marketed as a "monoglove", this term is more correctly used to describe the form of armbinder often depicted in the bondage artwork of John Willie. Unlike most commercially available armbinders that are very baggy and not particularly form fitting, John Willie's images showed a leather glove that contoured to the exact shape and size of the arms behind the back, with the elbows always touching together, and the shoulders pulled back. The result was a very slick single arm in a glove look, hence the term "monoglove". In reality, such monogloves are very hard to find that fit perfectly, and as such would in most circumstances require customized design and fitting for the individual wearing it. Monogloves, due to the harshness of the position, can be very difficult to wear for any prolonged periods of time, however in comparison to rope bondage can in most situations be easier to maintain. When rope bondage is used at the elbows all the stress is pinpointed to just those areas where the ropes are, increasing the risk of circulation issues. In comparison, a correctly fitting monoglove spreads the stress down the entire length of the arms. John Willie's artwork often depicted unrealistic or impossible bondage positions and equipment; however, a monoglove very similar was once manufactured by Ron Brandt, and utilized extensively by the professional bondage publication scene, using models that were very experienced in maintaining such extreme and strict positions.

The John Willie style of monoglove used a different method of securing the armbinder to the upper body, diverging from the common method of shoulder straps across the chest. Instead, a Y-shaped yoke would run up the back, fork over the shoulders, and run under the armpits, with an optional addition of a strap or chain running up the back from the Y-shaped yoke to a collar around the neck. The fingertip end of the monoglove was frequently provided with a D-ring, allowing the bound arms to be anchored into a hogtie or strappado position, or to be strapped to the front of a waist belt (forcing the hands into the crotch).

== Construction materials ==
Monogloves are usually made of thin garment leather or latex, though other fetish materials, such as spandex or rubber, are commonly used; monogloves of denim, camouflage twill, reinforced satin, and other strong fabrics exist. Closures can utilize lacing with eyelets, zippers, straps with buckles, or combinations of all three. Some variations also utilize buckles that can have a lock inserted for additional security.

== Cuffs, rods and straps ==
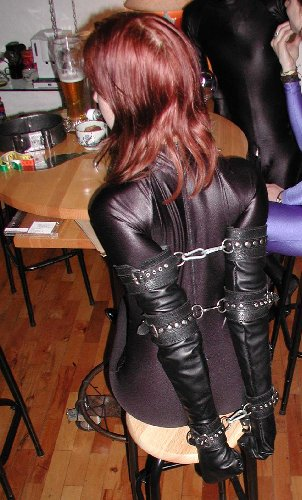
A woman wearing an armbinder using bondage mittens (specifically "bondage opera gloves") and bondage cuffs

Another form of an armbinder consists of cuffs and straps combined to hold the arms to the side of the body, or in front or back of the body. A series of cuffs, which can be made from various materials such as leather or metal, are placed on the arms at various points such as the wrists and elbows. These cuffs are then linked together with a webbing of straps, or a series of rods, to hold the arms in a particular position. To improve strength, as well as ease of use, all the cuffs and straps are typically linked together, which is why the complete piece of equipment is considered an armbinder. Another form uses a single rod, with the cuffs attached at regular distances down its length, and sometimes also including a collar at the top to hold the rod in place.

== Safety issues and visual appeal ==
Because of the extreme position into which the arms are sometimes forced, many armbinders, and especially monogloves, can cause problems with the soft tissues of the shoulder joints and with the circulation and innervation of the arms and hands. Only the most flexible people can wear them for any length of time; thus they are more often used for dramatic or visual effect in bondage erotica than in actual BDSM play. But for those who are able to tolerate having their arms pressed so tightly together behind their back that their elbows touch or nearly touch, the evenly distributed pressure of the monoglove maintains this extreme position with far less discomfort, and far less likelihood of injury, than do ropes. (For this property it was singled out for mention in the widely read 1972 manual The Joy of Sex, well before the "mainstreaming" of BDSM imagery. A 1970 scholarly study had already noted the great frequency with which this "appliance" figures in fetish literature and imagery, and pointed out its tendency to enhance the female figure). Nevertheless, great caution should always be exercised when using one, to avoid dislocation of the shoulders and damage to nerves and blood vessels.

There are several variations on the basic monoglove design, including single sleeves ending at the wrists (allowing some freedom of movement for the wearer's hands), and those that are incorporated into a larger garment, such as a jacket, catsuit, or dress, taking the place of the garment's usual sleeves.
