= Thumbcuffs =

Physical restraint device used on the thumbs

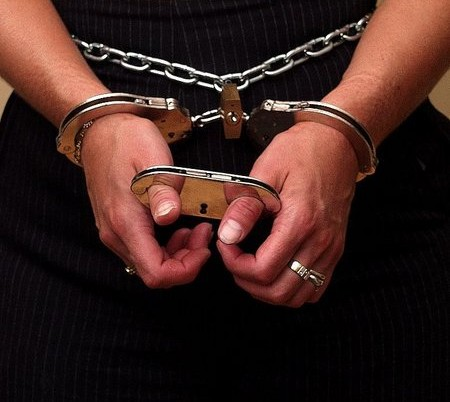
A model wearing both thumbcuffs and handcuffs

Thumbcuffs are a metal restraining device that lock thumbs in proximity to each other.

Thumbcuffs were originally intended for use by detectives, narcotics officers and off-duty policemen, their size allowing them to be carried in the pocket. Most are rigid devices, while some used in Asian countries are chain-linked, like miniature handcuffs.

Thumbcuffs are rarely used due to an increased possibility of injury, most commonly by tight cuffs blocking blood circulation. Their trade is illegal in the European Union. Handcuffs are usually used instead.

Thumbcuffs with double locks have a lockspring which, when engaged, usually using the top of the key, stops the thumbcuff from ratcheting tighter and prevents the subject from tightening them, possibly causing injury. Double locks also make picking the locks more difficult.

== See also ==
- Bondage cuffs
- Chinese finger trap
- Handcuffs
- Legcuffs
