= Spreader bar =

Restraint device used for BDSM

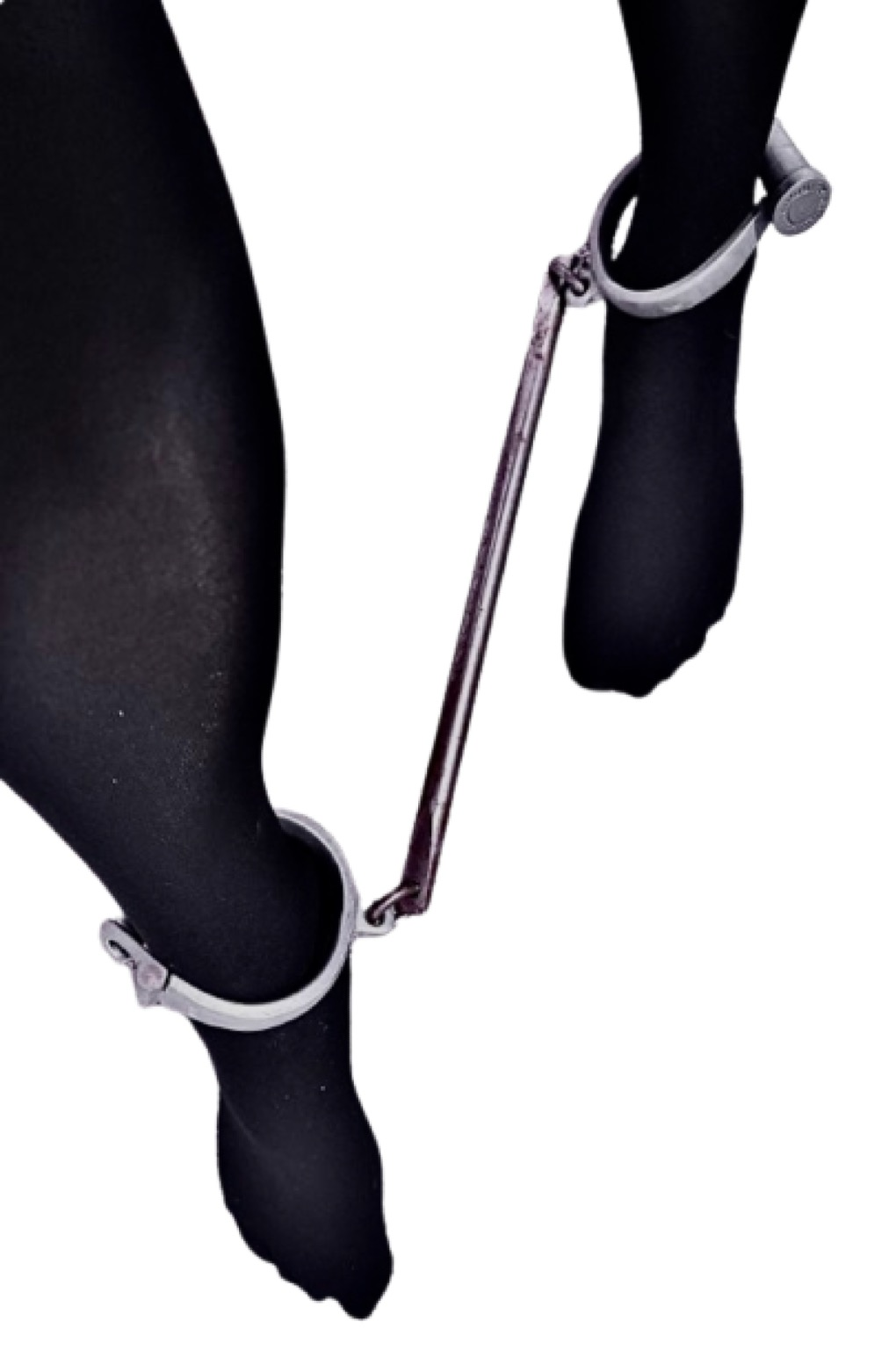
Use of a Darby style spreader bar

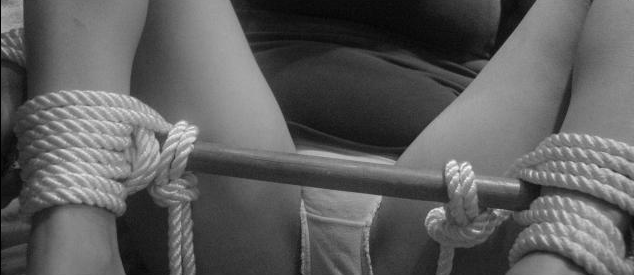
A spreader bar affixed with rope

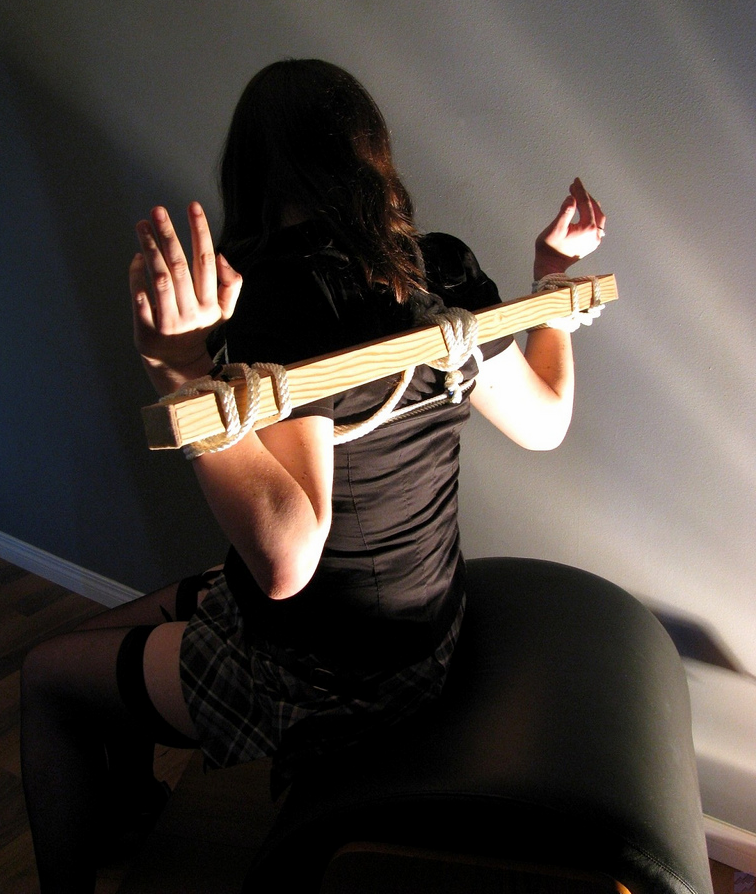
Use of an arms spreader bar

A spreader bar is an article of bondage equipment usually consisting of a metal or wooden bar, with attachment points for bondage cuffs at each end, which can be fastened to wrists, ankles or knees to hold them apart. They are used in bondage play, and sometimes in bedroom bondage, usually in association with other bondage equipment.

When applied to the wrists, a bar keeps the arms spread away from the body, providing an unimpeded access to the subject's torso. When applied to the ankles or between the knees, it immobilizes the subject by preventing all but the most awkward walking, and keeping the legs spread to allow unimpeded access to the subject's groin and trunk. If bars are applied between the knees and between the ankles, the subject may be forced to bend their knees, making walking even harder. A pair of bars may hold the subject in a spreadeagle position.

The bar may be attached solely to the subject, or it may be attached to a piece of furniture, the floor or a device for suspension bondage. Homemade versions can be made from dowels, bamboo rods, or closet poles.

== See also ==
- Stocks
- List of BDSM equipment
