= Shackel =

Shackel is a surname. It is a variant of Shackell. Notable people with the surname include:

- Dayle Shackel (born 1970), New Zealand cricketer
- Paul A. Shackel, American anthropologist and archaeologist
