= Thomas Shackle (cricketer, born 1834) =

English cricketer

Thomas Shackle (28 July 1834 – 12 March 1887) was an English cricketer who enjoyed a brief season of first-class cricket for Middlesex in 1868, and otherwise played regularly for non-first-class teams including Buckinghamshire, Southgate and Wimbledon cricket clubs. His Middlesex season featured three matches, where he scored 67 runs at a batting average of 16.75 and a best of 41 not out.
