= Tickle fetishism =

Paraphilia involving tickling

Tickle fetishism, also known as knismolagnia, knismophilia, or titillagnia, is a paraphilia where an individual receives sexual pleasure from tickling, being tickled, or watching someone be tickled. Individuals may prefer to be the dominant party, known as a ler (from tickler), or the submissive party, known as a lee (from ticklee), or they may enjoy both, known as a switch. Some people may prefer to be tickled in specific areas, typically in an erogenous zone or other particularly sensitive areas of the body.

== In BDSM ==
Restraint, bondage, and sexual humiliation may be aspects of an erotic tickling session, though they are not necessary. A BDSM tickling session can involve submissive partners being tied or restrained in a position that exposes bare parts of the body, particularly those that are sensitive to tickling, such as the feet or armpits. The body being exposed can also be intended as a form of humiliation or exhibitionism for the lee, or as visual stimulus for the ler. Tools may be used to tickle if desired.

== See also ==
- Tickle torture
- Tickling
- Sensation play
