= Mister Leather Europe =

European fetish leather subculture event and title

Mr. Leather Europe
- The sash of the Mr Leather Europe contest.
- Nickname: MLE
- Status: Active
- Genre: leather; kink; fetish; BDSM
- Frequency: Annually
- Inaugurated: 1985
- Organiser: European Confederation of Motorsport Club
- Website: ecmc.eu/mr-leather-europe/

Declan Donohoe, winner the Mr Leather Europe 2027

Mr Leather Europe (Note: Both the term Mister Leather Europe and Mr Leather Europe is often used interchangeability) (MLE) is an annual pan-European contest for leathermen, held every autumn in October or November. Organized by the European Confederation of Motorcycle Clubs (ECMC), the event rotates yearly among different member clubs. Within the leather community, it is widely regarded as the most prestigious title after International Mr. Leather.

The inaugural contest took place in 1985 in Hamburg, Germany, where Sweden's David Riseborough claimed the title. Declan Donohue of Dublin, Ireland, holds the current 2027 Mister Leather Europe title.

To compete, participants must first win a local or regional ECMC member club contest. Winners are typically sponsored to represent the region at the International Mr. Leather competition in Chicago the following May. While early contests mirrored traditional American leather pageants, the title has since evolved into a community leadership role. Winners are expected to use their platform to promote both the ECMC and the broader European leather and fetish community.

== European Confederation of Motorcycle Clubs ==
Logo of ECMC

Founded in 1974, the European Confederation of Motorcycle Clubs (ECMC) serves as an umbrella organization for 35 full and three probationary leather fetish clubs across Europe. The phrase "motorcycle club" originated as a discreet cover for gay leather gatherings during an era of heavy social stigma, though many groups did run genuine riding divisions. The ECMC grew out of a late-1960s push for regional networking, building on groundbreaking milestones like the opening of Amsterdam’s Argos in 1957, which was Europe's first leather bar and London’s Sixty Nine Club in 1965, the European continent's first leather club.

As club numbers expanded, organized coordination became crucial, yet early organizers faced steep hurdles. Long-distance travel was challenging and expensive, communication depended on postal mail or costly phone calls, and homosexuality was still widely criminalized or pathologized. Building international ties wasn't just about socializing; it was a vital strategy to foster community, preserve their culture, and protect members from legal and societal threats.

Formal cross-border collaboration took shape in April 1969 with the Atlantic Mid-West Coordinating Council (later the Atlantic Motorcycle Coordinating Council, or AMCC), which included the Sixty Nine Club. Rapid expansion soon prompted the council to divide into regional branches, sparking the creation of the ECMC.

On 14 January 1974, the Sixty Nine Club hosted delegates in London to establish the new confederation and chose its own secretary to lead it. Operating as a central hub for information and support, the ECMC used its inaugural meetings to lock in core rules: member clubs had to be non-profits with at least fifteen members holding annual meetings, and leadership would rotate to a new club every two years.

=== List of members ===
Country	Club	Title available	Notes	Link
Austria	LMC Vienna	Mr Fetish Austria		
Belgium	MSC Belgium	Mr Leather Belgium		
Denmark	SLM Copenhagen	Mr Leather Denmark		
Denmark	SLM Aarhus	N/A		
Estonia	LMC Estonia	N/A		
Finland	MSC Finland - Tom's Club	Mr Fetish Finland		
France	Association Sportive Motocycliste de France	Mr Leather France		
France	Évidence	Mr Fetish France	Probabtionary member	
Germany	BLF Berlin	Mr Fetish Berlin		
Germany	LC Stuttgart	Mr Fetish Baden-Württemberg		
Germany	Leguan Hannover	N/A		
Germany	MSC Hamburg	Mr. Leather Hamburg, Mr. Fetish Hamburg	Two titles	
Germany	MLC Münchner Löwen Club	Bavarian Mister Fetish		
Germany	Nuremberg Leather Club	N/A		
Germany	Rheinfetisch	N/A	Probabtionary member	
Ireland	Leathermen of Ireland	Mr Leather Dublin		
Italy	Leather Club Roma	Mr. Leather Italia		
Italy	Leather Friends Italia	Mr. Leather Italia		
Italy	Leather & Fetish Milano	Italian Fetishman of the Year		
The Netherlands	MS Amsterdam	Mr Leather Netherlands		
Norway	SLM Oslo	Mr Leather Norway		
Poland	Polish Leather Uniform Group	Mr Leatherman Poland		
Portugal	Gear Club Portugal	N/A		
Russia	SPBL Club	N/A		
Spain	ILBS+ (International Leather & Boots Spain+)	Mr International Leather & Boots Spain		
Spain	Leatherman Club of Spain	Mr Leather Spain		
Sweden	SLM Stockholm	Mr Baltic Battle		
Sweden	SLM Göteberg	N/A		
Sweden	SLM Malmö	N/A	Probabtionary member	
Switzerland	Leathermen of Switzerland	Mr Fetish Switzerland (Note: The title non-gender specific so the person can be Ms. Fetish Switzerland or Mx. Fetish Switzerland)		
United Kingdom	Leatherman Cyrmu	Mr Leather Cymru		
United Kingdom	Lethermen of Scotland	Mr Leather Scotland		
United Kingdom	London Leathermen	Mr Leather London		
United Kingdom	Manchester Leatherman	N/A		

== History ==
The origins of Mr Leather Europe lie in the Baltic Battle, a Northern European leather fetish event hosted by SLM Stockholm in association with MSC Helsinki that began in the 1978. The event included the crowning of "Mr Baltic Battle", modelled after similar contests held in American leather bars and clubs. The growing popularity of the event and the increasing number of participating leather clubs led to the creation of the Mr Leather Europe title at the 1985 Baltic Battle which took place in Hamburg. In 1995, ECMC assumed full control of the contest, coinciding with the event's relocation from contest's original home in Hamburg.

== Contest ==
The contest takes place during the ECMC's annual general meeting, which is hosted as part of a weekend-long leather event organised by a host club.

On Friday evening, the candidates meet with the ECMC delegates for a welcome reception, typically beginning with a group "family photo" of all attendees.

On Saturday, the confederation holds its general meeting, which features a presentation of all running candidates to the delegates and a farewell speech by the outgoing Mr Leather Europe. That afternoon, the jury interviews the candidates individually, questioning them on their knowledge of leather history, their plans for the title should they win, and their general background. Following the AGM, candidates and delegates either attend a collective dinner or proceed directly to the contest venue for the public stage presentation.

On stage, the comperes ask each candidate two questions. Typically this includes one light-hearted question related to their home country or city, before each candidate delivers a timed, one-minute pitch to the audience, after which voting takes place.

=== Scoring ===
Scoring is determined through an aggregate system agreed upon by the ECMC, in which a pre-appointed jury accounts for two-thirds of the total vote and the audience accounts for the remaining third.

The jury comprises seven judges: the outgoing Mr Leather Europe, four club delegates selected at random during a prior ECMC committee meeting, and two additional judges jointly appointed by the host club. Following the stage pitches, audience members cast their vote by placing a token into a ballot box designated for their preferred candidate. Two tally masters, appointed by the host club, count all ballots and certify the final result.

== Winners ==
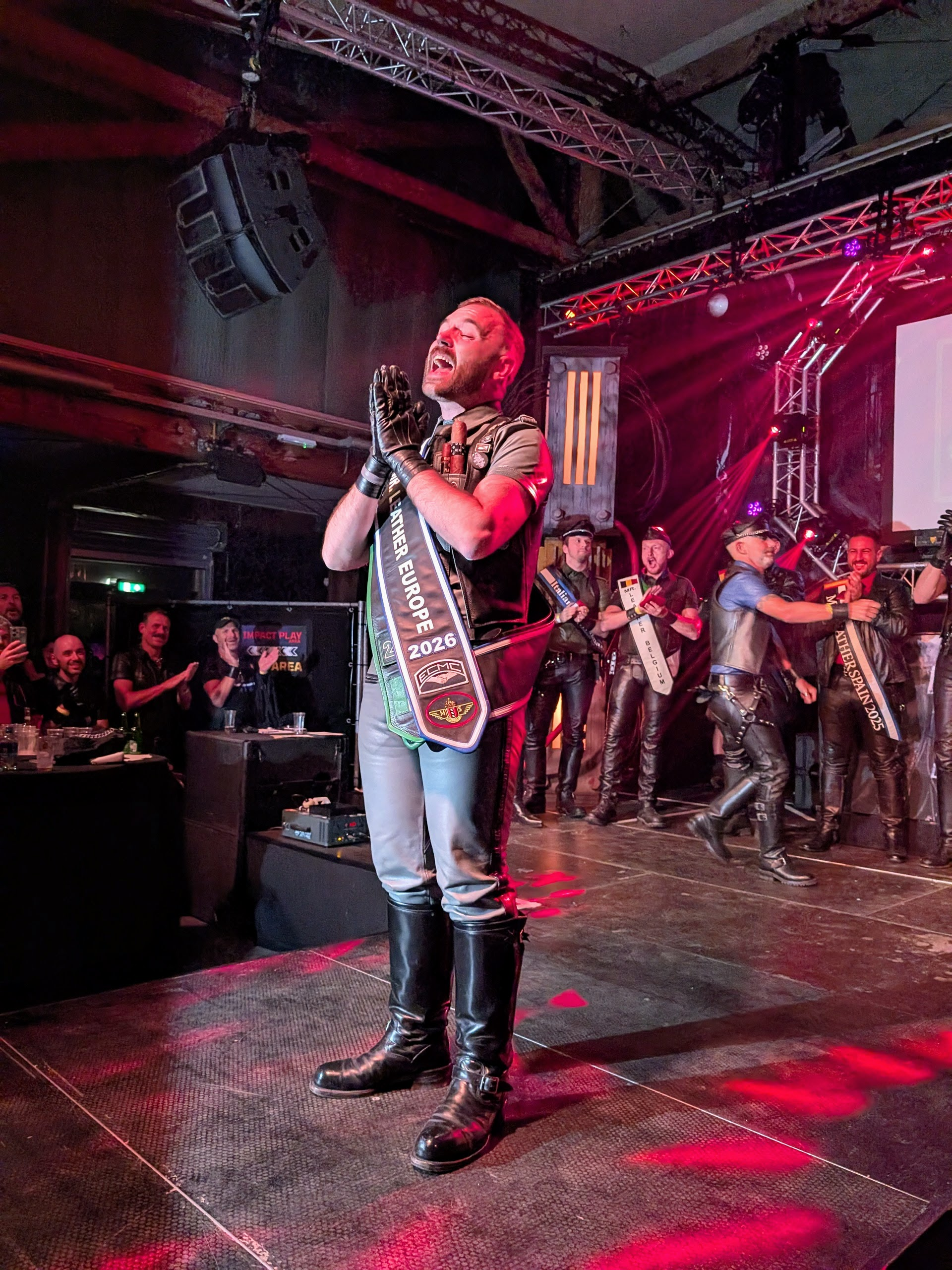
Jamie Ryan, Mr. Leather Europe 2026

While the MLE contest has been held since at least 1985, complete records of past winners are difficult to locate. As of 2026, this list is incomplete and only reflects the information currently accessible to the public.
MLE Year	Date	MLE winner	Winner's preliminary title or sponsor	Winner's city	Field of contestants	Contest's location	Host Club
1985		David Riseborough	Mr Tomsson	Stockholm, Sweden		Hamburg, Germany	MSC Hamburg e.V.
1986	1986-08-09					Bauernhaus Hamburg	MSC Hamburg e.V.
1987		Thomas Karasch		Hamburg, Germany			MSC Hamburg e.V.
1988		Vincente Jimenez		Barcelona, Spain			
1989							
1990							
1991							
1992		A. J. Steigenberger					
1993							
1994	1995-10-08					Wasahallen, Stockholm, Sweden	SLM Stockholm
1995	1995-11-05	Antonio Sanchez	MSC Madrid	Madrid, Spain	24	Amsterdam, Netherlands	MSC Amsterdam
1996	1996-10-11–13	Dario van der Lundin Videla	Mr Baltic Battle	Stockholm, Sweden		Brussels, Belgium	MSC Belgium
1997	1997-08-23	Stein Lösnesgaard				Manchester, England	Manchester Super Chain, Motor Sports Club (MSC-MSC)
1998	1998-10-09	Rob Scheers		Antwerp, Belgium		Zurich, Switzerland	Loge 70
1999		Peter Wallace	Mr. Leather SLM-Oslo	Gothenburg, Sweden		Copenhagen, Denmark	SLM Copenhagen
2000	2000-08-19					Milan, Italy	
2001	2001-10-06	Maurizio	Mr Leather Italy	Varese, Italy		Stuttgart, Germany	
2002	2002-10-19	Fernando Manzali	Mr. Leather Italy	Mantua, Italy		chalet de la porte jaune Paris France	ASMF Paris
2003	2003-10-03–05	Saad Hasson	Mr Baltic Battle	Stockholm, Sweden		MS Cap San Diego, Hamburg	MSC Hamburg
2004	2004-09-18	Roberto Menichetti	Mister Leather Belgium	Antwerp, Belgium		Helsinki, Finland	
2005	2005-09-16	Christian Roger				Amsterdam	MS Amsterdam
2006		Simen Enersen	Mr Leather Denmark	Aarhus, Denmark		Fabrikken, Oslo, Norway	SLM Oslo
2007	2007-09-27	Martin Cedergren	Mr Baltic Battle	Stockholm, Sweden	5	Gamla Tryckeriet, Stockholm, Sweden	SLM Stockholm
2008	2008-10-18	Ralf Lauritzen Rasmussen	Mr. Leather Denmark	Copenhagen, Denmark	6	Universal Hall, Berlin	BLF Berlin
2009	2009-10-03	Pieter Claeys	Mr. MS Amsterdam	Amsterdam, Netherlands	5	Risto Theatre, Rome	Leather Club Rome
2010	2010-10-02	Eric Gutierrez	Mr Leather France	Paris, France	9	Tanzhaus West, Frankfurt	FLC Frankfurter Leder Club
2011	2011-10-01	Alexi Carpentieri	Mr Baltic Battle	Stockholm, Sweden	10	Kulturhuset Islands, Copenhagen	SLM Copenhagen
2012	2012-10-20	Kilker Alcaraz	Mr Leather UK	London, United Kingdom	9	Mazza Restaurant, YoHo, Hamburg	Spike Hamburg
2013	2013-11-09	Francesco	Mr Leatherman Italia	Milan, Italy	9	Kofler Restaurant, Padua	Leather Friends Italia
2014	2014-10-25	Arnaud Houesnard	Mr. Leather Amsterdam	Amsterdam, Netherlands	7	Eagle Amsterdam, Amsterdam	MS Amsterdam
2015	2015-10-24	Thorsten Buhl	Mr. Leather Austria	Vienna, Austria	9	Fluc, Vienna	LMC Vienna
2016	2016-08-27	Joe King	Mr. Leather UK		9	Helsinki, Finland	MSC Finland
2017	2017-10-28	Raymond Timmer	Mr. Leather Amsterdam	Amsterdam, Netherlands	5	Amsterdam, Netherlands	MS Amsterdam
2019	2018-10-13	Evert Leerson	Mr. Leather Netherlands	Amsterdam, Netherlands		Paris, France	ASMF Paris
2020	2019-10-12	Stevio Blackhart	Italian Fetishman of the Year	Milan, Italy	8	Rome, Italy	Leather Club Roma
~~2021~~	Contest cancelled due to COVID-19 pandemic						
~~2022~~	Contest cancelled due to COVID-19 pandemic						
2023	2022-10-01	Andy Walgraef	Mister Leather Belgium	Antwerp, Belgium	7	Manchester, UK	Manchester Leatherman
2024	2023-10-28	Tom Keller	Mr. Leather London	London, UK	6	Milan, Italy	Leather Friends Italia
2025	2024-10-19	David "Weeble" Pleavin	Mr Leather Cymru	Cardiff, Wales	8	Zurich, Switzerland	Leathermen of Switzerland
2026	2025-10-18	Jamie Ryan	Mr Leather Dublin	Dublin, Ireland	10	IJland, Amsterdam, Netherlands	MS Amsterdam
2027	2026-11-07	Declan Donohue	Mr Leather Dublin	Dublin, Ireland	9	Seville, Spain	International Leather & Boots Spain +
2028						Rome, Italy	Leather Club Roma
2029						Stockholm, Sweden	SLM Stockholm

=== Mr Leather Europe 2026 ===
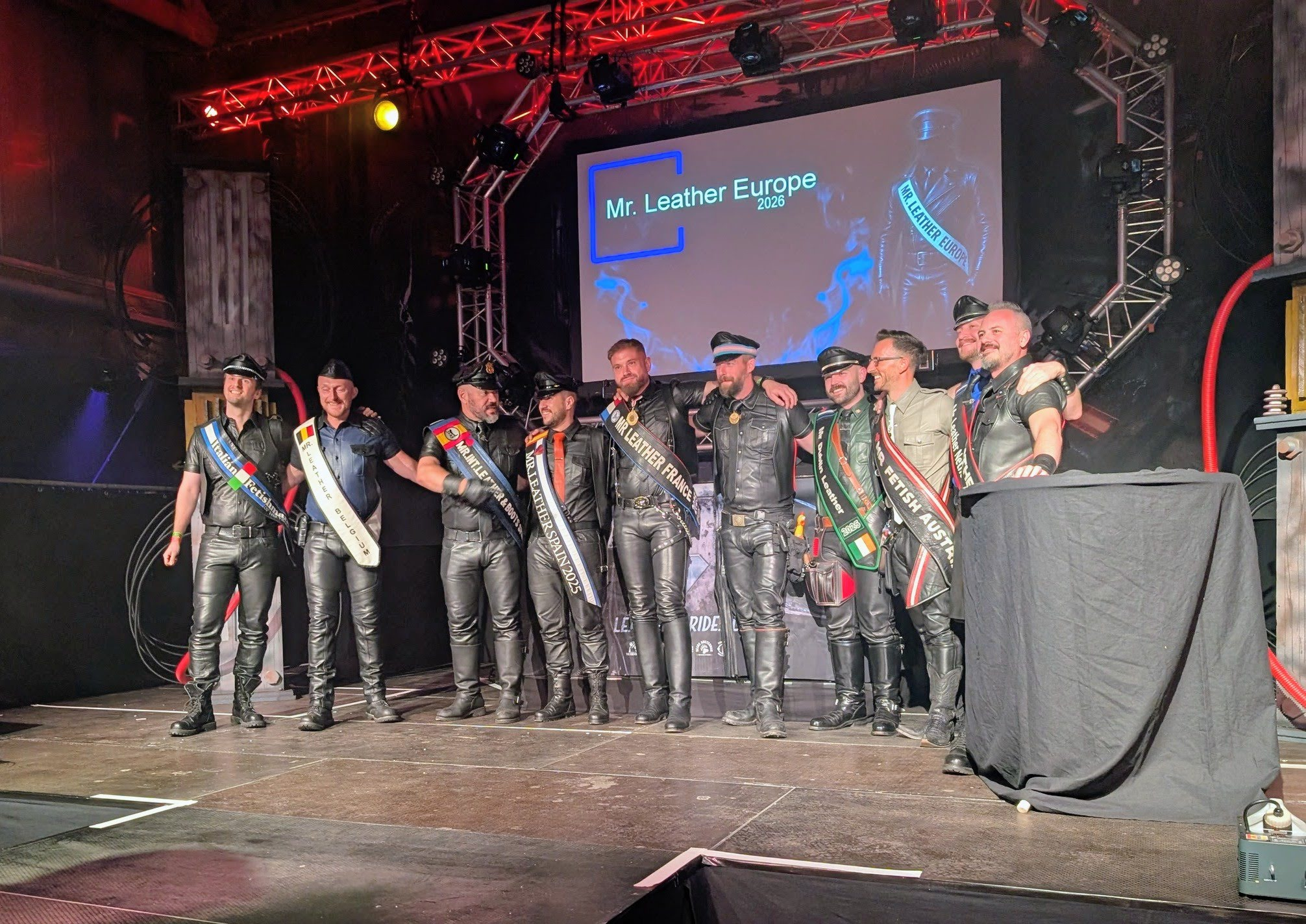
A pre-contest line-up of the ten contestants for the Mr Leather Europe 2026 title.

The Mr Leather Europe 2026 contest took place on 18 October 2025 during Amsterdam Leather Weekend at the IJland venue in the Amsterdam-Noord district of Amsterdam. Ten candidates competed for the title, which was won by Jamie Ryan (Mr Leather Dublin 2025):

- Kai – Italian Fetishman of the Year 2025
- Fred – Mr Leather Belgium 2025
- Pedro – Mr International Leather & Boots Spain 2025
- Chuso – Mr Leather Spain 2025
- Alex – Mr Leather France 2025
- Andreas – Mr Leather Berlin 2024
- Jamie Ryan – Mr Leather Dublin 2025
- Andreas – Mr Fetish Austria 2025
- Mees – Mr Leather Netherlands 2025
- Galen – Mr Leather London 2025

=== Mr Leather Europe 2027 ===
A pre-contest line-up of the nine contestants for the Mr Leather Europe 2027 title.

The Mr Leather Europe 2027 contest took place on 7 November 2026 during the International Leather & Boots Spain + (ILBS+) Leather Weekend in Seville. Hosted in the theatre of the Hogar Virgen de los Reyes cultural centre in the Macarena district, the contest featured nine candidates and was won by Declan Donohue (Mr Leather Dublin 2026):

- Mike Goudeseune – Mr Leather Belgium 2026
- Luciano Allegretti – Mr Leather Italy 2026
- Benoît Gamand – Mr Leather France 2026
- Declan Donohue – Mr Leather Dublin 2026
- Andreas Meichelböck – Bavarian Mister Fetish 2025
- Matteo "Mad" Farina – Italian Fetishman of the Year 2026
- Bartosz Fislak – Mr Leatherman Poland 2025
- Cliff Hoffmann – Mr Fetish Austria 2026
- Miguel Pires – Mr International Leather & Boots Spain 2026

Before the contest started, a minute silence was given in remembrance to the Urda train accident which happen last month, as many of the attendees were planning to use the Madrid-Seville line to travel to the contest.

== Other European titles ==
Since its inception, the Mister Leather Europe (MLE) contest has inspired several similar titles across the continent:

- Mister Rubber Europe: Founded in 2007 by the Karlsruhe-based latex fetish club RubClub, this title has been managed since 2024 by the Confederation of European Rubber Clubs, an umbrella organization similar to the ECMC. Unlike Mr. Leather Europe, which requires contestants to hold a local club title, Mister Rubber Europe follows a format similar to Mister International Rubber (MIR): local titleholders are preferred, but local titles are not strictly required. As of 2026, the current titleholder is Michał aka “Moon”, who is also the Mister Rubber Poland 2025
- European Puppy and European Handler: Administered by the Belgian organization European Puppy and Handler, these titles are contested annually by pup players at the Darklands fetish event in Antwerp. As of 2026, the current European Puppy is Lars, formerly Czech Puppy 2025 and the current European Handler is Jimmy, a handler from Switzerland.
- Mr. Sportswear Europe: Awarded by the French association United Sportswear Europe, this serves as the premier title for sportswear fetishists. Like MLE, the contestants have to be titleholders of their respective countries. However the competition in their home country is open to all. As of 2026, the current Mr Sportswear Europe 2026 is Chris, who was Mr Sportswear UK 2023.
- Mr. Fetish Europe: Rather than a collaborative multi-club effort, this is a standalone title awarded during Maspalomas Fetish Pride, held every October in Gran Canaria, Spain. As of 2026, the current Mr Fetish Europe 2026 is Rain.

== See also ==
- Mister Rubber Europe
- International Mister Leather
- International Ms. Leather
- Leather Archives and Museum
- Leather subculture
- Rubber and PVC fetishism
- LGBT culture
