= Plastic clothing =

Garments made from flexible plastic

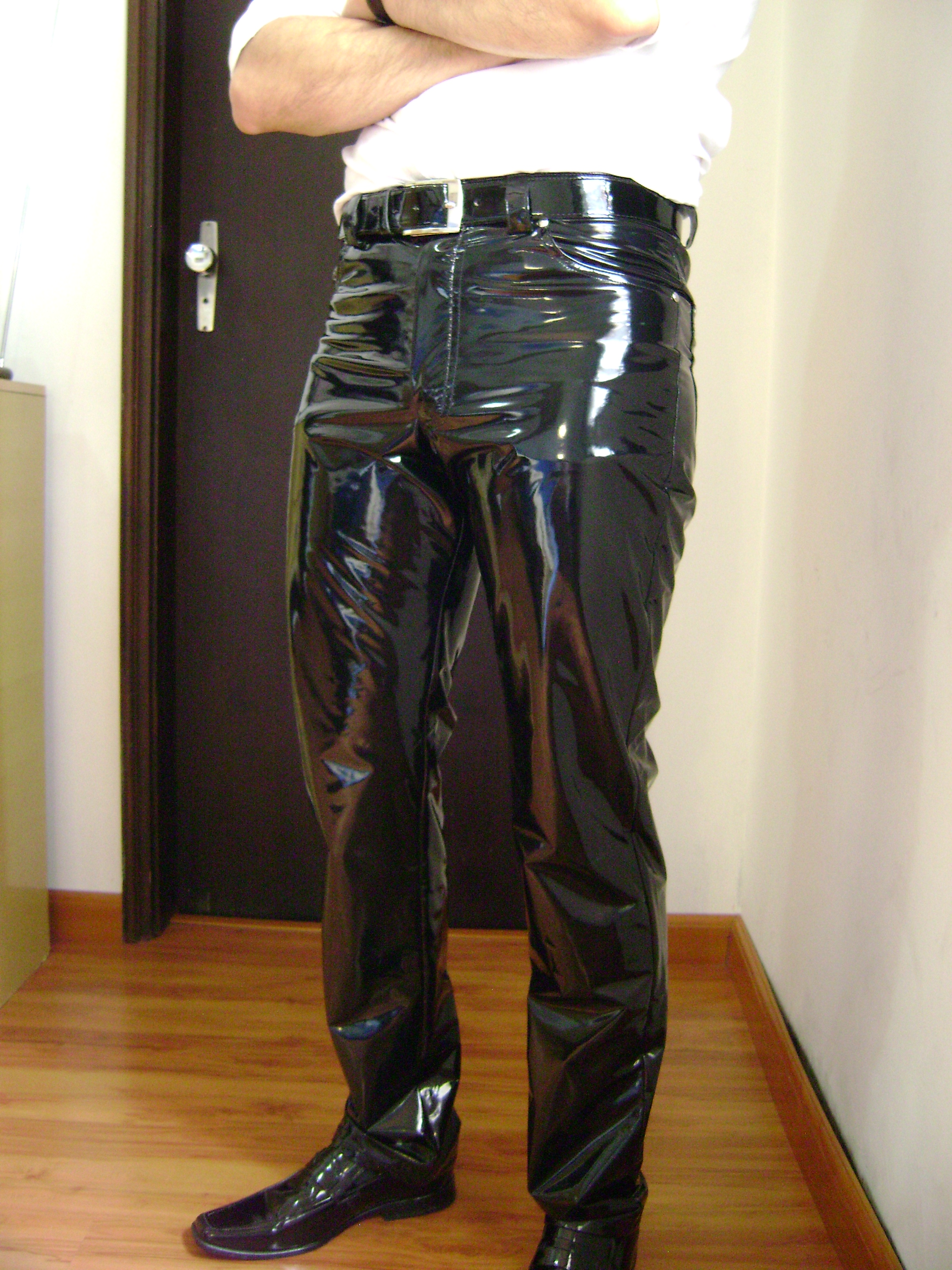
PVC pants are an example of plastic clothing

Plastic clothing is clothing made from flexible sheets of plastics such as PVC, as distinct from clothing made from plastic-based synthetic fiber textiles such as polyester. Plastic clothing has existed almost since the creation of flexible plastic, particularly rain-protection garments made from waterproof fabrics.

Fashions during the 1960s included plastic clothing such as PVC miniskirts and PVC raincoats. PVC raincoats were often brightly coloured, initially as a road safety feature for children, but later as a fashion item. They were far lighter and cheaper than rubberized mackintoshes or woven gabardine raincoats, and could also be made transparent or translucent. There was great enthusiasm at the time for the use of plastic and paper garments as futuristic clothing.

Modern clothing commonly uses flexible plastic materials, in the form of both flexible plastic sheeting and plasticized fabric. Rigid plastic components are also used to replace components which would have formerly been made of metal, bone, rubber, or other materials, for example in the form of buttons, collar stiffeners and zip fasteners. Plastic components are used extensively in footwear.

Plastic materials are also commonly used in protective clothing.

Plastic clothing is not very suitable for exercise in warm conditions. It produces high relative humidity close to the skin which retards vaporisation of moisture from the skin's surface, reducing or in some cases preventing evaporative cooling.

A man wearing a plastic bag as a shirt as trashion

As with other plastic items, plastic clothing is generally not biodegradable and its disposal can lead to plastic pollution.

Many items of plastic clothing are produced for single use eg polythene rain coats, laboratory coats and some PPE items.

Plastic clothing has also become the subject of fetishistic interest, in a similar way to rubber clothing; see PVC clothing and PVC and rubber fetishism.

There have also been fashion trends involving the wearing of plastic shopping and rubbish bags as clothing, clothing made from plastic bags is also an element of trashion.

== See also ==
- Plastic pants
