= Vinyl fetishism =

Vinyl fetishism may refer to one of the following:

- Latex and PVC fetishism
- Record collecting
