= Rubber pants =

Type of undergarments

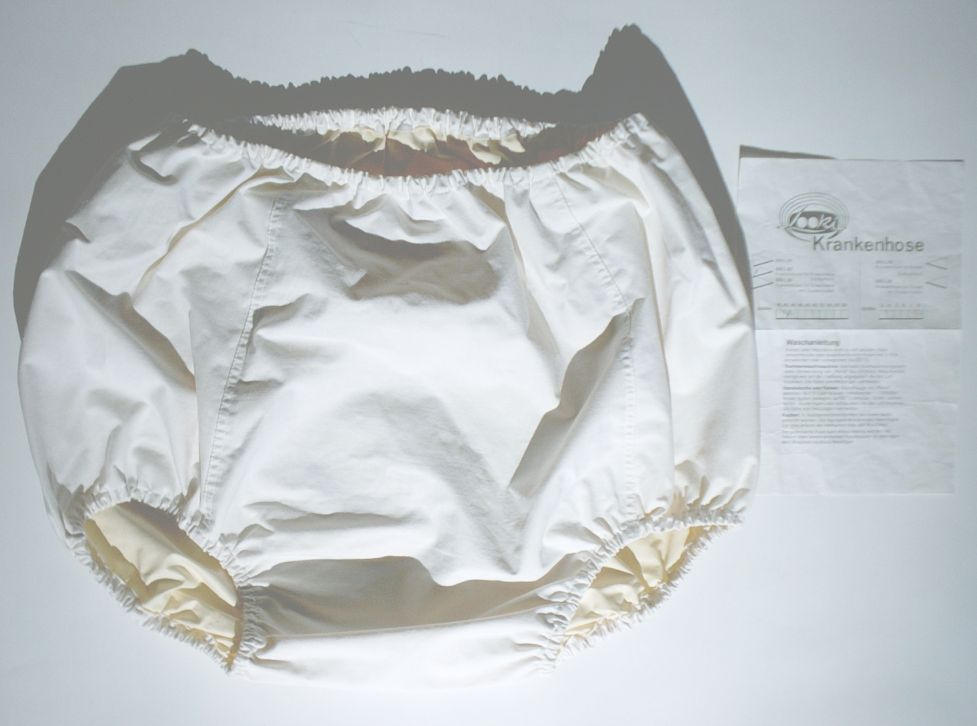
Rubber pants (about 1950)

Rubber pants or rubber panties were the predecessor to plastic pants and served the purpose of a diaper cover, replacing the woolen garment. However, "rubber pants" is still a generic term for any pull-on or snap-on incontinence protective garment.

Lacking a fly front, the traditional variant is a true panty. As an infants' garment they had fallen out of favor in the 1950s, but were still the primary adult incontinence protective garment and in that role were called "rubber bloomers".

Rubber pants for infants' wear over cloth diapers fell into two categories. Some were made of natural rubber and had rubber gathers at the waist and legs. The rubber pant itself was sized generously so the stretchy characteristic of rubber was not utilized and some air circulation took place within the oversized pants. Some were made of latex rubber that utilized the stretchy characteristic and fit very snugly over the diaper, leaving no air space.

Perhaps the best known of these stretchy latex pants were introduced by Playtex. Playtex baby pants stretched over the diaper much like rubber gloves are stretched over a hand. Undersized leg holes and waist opening allowed the stretchy latex rubber to seal against the skin to contain diaper wetness and therefore protect what ever the baby was placed upon. Ventilation was supposedly provided by two slots (holes) in the front of the pants up near the waist but they did little more than allow leakage onto the bed when baby slept on its stomach.

Stretchy, molded latex pants for adults are mostly limited to the fetish market, being supplied primarily as wear for "rubberists", who enjoy wearing rubber and latex. Molded latex pants for incontinent wear are not common but can be ordered over the Internet.

They have now been almost entirely replaced by plastic or waterproof textile panties as an infants' garment, when such is used over a diaper at all. Today they exist mainly in the adult incontinence market.

Modern Rubber Pants

Parents opting to cloth diaper their children now have several options in a diaper cover. They can use a wool cover, a polyurethane laminate, or a breathable polar fleece cover.

== See also ==
- Plastic pants
- Cloth diaper
