= Mister Rubber Europe =

European fetish rubber subculture event and title

Mr Rubber Europe
- Abbreviation: MRE
- Status: Active
- Genre: rubber; kink; fetish; BDSM
- Frequency: Annually
- Inaugurated: 2007, 2024
- Organiser: CERC - Confederation of European Rubber Clubs
- Website: www.rubbercontest.eu

Mister Rubber Europe (Note: Both the term Mister Rubber Europe and Mr Rubber Europe is often used interchangeability) (MRE) is an annual pan-European contest and title for rubber enthusiasts, held every year. It is organised by the collective group the Confederation of European Rubber Clubs (CERC), which the event is host annually by one of its member clubs. It is seen as the rubber version of the leather fetish Mister Leather Europe title.

== History ==
The history of the Mister Rubber Europe title comes in three notable parts.

=== 2007-2013: Mr Euro Rubber ===
Originally known as Mister Euro Rubber, the inaugural contest took place during Pentecost 2007 at the Rubclub fetish club in Karlsruhe, Germany, with subsequent editions held during the "Rubberpride" weekend during Pentecost in 2011 and 2013. The club Rubclub was known in the European gay scene with fetish parties from 1998 to 2014, when it stopped its activities due to the lack of suitable venues. The first three editions of Mister Euro Rubber was seen by the rubber fetish community as a stepping stone to bring together rubber lovers from across Europe and inspired the future of the community.

=== 2018-2020: Mr Rubber Europe ===
The contest adopted its current name Mr Rubber Europe in 2018, when a group of engaged rubber fetishists from different European countries joined forces to create a title which inspired by the Mr Euro Rubber title. The first two contests took place in 2018 and 2019 during the Darklands fetish festival in Antwerp, with the idea creating opportunities of connection and bringing rubber on an important international stage. This led to an idea to make Mr Rubber Europe into a travelling event carried by different rubber communities across Europe, as a way to further boost connections at the continental level and at the same time promoting the local clubs and groups. The first travelling edition was planned for April 2020 during the fetish event of Manchester Rubber Weekend in Manchester, but the plans were stopped by the COVID-19 pandemic. After the pandemic, the original MRE organising team decided to stop their activities and hand over the baton to a new team.

=== 2024 onwards: the Confederation of European Rubber Clubs ===
In 2022 at the tail end of COVID-19 pandemic after the original MRE team abandoned their activities, some engaged community members started informal talks about the possibility of rebooting the Mr Rubber Europe title. This lead to the foundation of the Confederation of European Rubber Clubs (CERC) group in 2024. The idea was to create a network of clubs that work together to organise a yearly rubber weekend and MRE election, strengthening the community ties. Such a group was influenced by the leather fetish European Confederation of Motorcycle Clubs (ECMC), which has been around since 1974. The idea behind the structure was ensures that Mr Rubber Europe is not owned by one single organisation or individual, but it is rather carried collectively by a large representation of the European rubber community.

The Mr Rubber Europe was relaunched one the 29 November 2024 in Barcelona, Spain, during the Barcelona Rubber Weekend organised by Rubber Spain. Between 12 to 14 December 2025, MRE was organised in Padua, Italy, by Leather Friends Italia. In October 2026, MRE was hosted in Amsterdam, the Netherlands, by the Dutch Rubbermen in collaboration with the Leather and Fetish Pride Netherlands, who celebrated their 30th anniversary. The current titleholder is Michał "Moon", previously Mr Rubber Poland 2025.

== Confederation of European Rubber Clubs ==
The association the Confederation of European Rubber Clubs (CERC) which was officially founded in 2024, after an exploratory phase of about two years, is a growing network of nine rubber fetish clubs across eight European countries. The mission of CERC gravitates around two core initiatives:

- Continuing and developing the legacy of the Mr Rubber Europe title;
- Fostering collaboration and mutual support between larger and smaller rubber clubs as well as informal rubber groups across Europe.

On 29 November 2024, five clubs from France, the Netherlands, Spain, Poland, and Italy formally agreed to establish the Confederation, which was inaugurated at the first CERC-organised Mr Rubber Europe contest in Barcelona, Spain. CERC has since expanded to include member clubs from Belgium, Czechia, and Germany, plus a second club from Italy. Membership is open to any rubber group based in Europe, whether they are formally registered as association or club, or they are organised informally as a group organising rubber events. The aim is to share experiences and skills for the benefit of the European rubber community.

=== List of CERC members ===
Club	Country	Title	Notes	Link
Belgian Rubbermen	Belgium	N/A		
Czech Rubbermen	Czechia	N/A		
French Rubbermen	France	Mr Rubber France		
Mister Rubber Berlin	Germany	Mr Rubber Berlin		
Leather Club Roma	Italy	Mr Rubber Italia	Also member of ECMC	
Leather Friends Italia	Italy	Mr Rubber Italia	Also member of ECMC	
Dutch Rubbermen	The Netherlands	Mr Rubber Netherlands		
PLAY - Polish Latex Assembly	Poland	Mr Rubber Poland		
Rubber Spain	Spain	Rubber Spain Ambassador		

== Format and scoring ==
=== Format and aim ===
The Mister Rubber Europe contest takes place annually during the Rubber Europe weekend, an event hosted on a rotating basis by a member club of the confederation. The stated objective of the competition is to select a person to be an ambassador to represent and promote the European rubber fetish community.

Entrants are not required to hold a prior local or regional title in order to compete. This is because not all European countries with active rubber communities organise local title contests. The competition accepts independent applicants to broaden geographic representation across the continent. An example of this is the 2024 titleholder, who entered the competition as an independent contestant. The competition is structured with minimal formal regulations, allowing titleholders the flexibility to pursue community projects of their choosing during their tenure with the support of the organization.

While each Rubber Europe weekend is different and reflects the peculiarities of the hosting club and country, some elements are usually maintained, such as during the weekend representatives of CERC member clubs carve time to meet for their annual general meeting, to regroup in person and discuss projects and ideas. The Rubber Europe weekend is in partly influenced by how the ECMC arranges its weekend and the Mister Leather Europe contest.

On the Friday evening, the Rubber Weekend is opened with a welcome reception, where the contestants are typically presented for the first time to the public. On the Saturday afternoon, while most attendees partake in social activities, such as a guided city tour or a rubber workshop, the jury interviews the candidates individually, questioning them on their rubber journey, their plans for the title should they win, and their general background. In the evening, a Rubber Europe show of about one to one-and-half hours is preformed. The show consists of which each contestant performs a show on stage demonstrating their passion for rubber and fetish culture, answers questions from the jury and/or the public, often a raffle for a selected charity, and together with a farewell speech by the outgoing Mr Rubber Europe.

Scoring to elect MRE is determined through an aggregate system agreed upon by CERC, in which a pre-appointed jury accounts for 80% of the total vote and the audience accounts for the remaining 20%, split evenly between the in-person audience (10%) and an online audience vote (10%). The jury usually comprises five judges: the outgoing Mr Rubber Europe and four additional judges that represent different aspects of the European Rubber community. Following the stage performances, in-person audience members cast their vote by placing a token into a ballot box designated for their preferred candidate, while remote viewers vote online. Tally masters, appointed by CERC and the host club, count all ballots and certify the final result.

== Winners ==
=== Mr Rubber Europe 2025 ===
The Mr Rubber Europe 2025 contest was held in Barcelona, Spain, on 30 November 2024 and was won by Rob, a rubber enthusiast from Glasgow, Scotland. The contestants were:

- Bearbie – Mr Rubber France
- Jack O – independent contestant (Germany)
- Rob – independent contestant (United Kingdom)
- Lactarius – independent contestant (France)
- Pedro – Rubber Spain Ambassador (Spain)

=== Mr Rubber Europe 2026 ===
The Mr Rubber Europe 2026 contest was held in Padua, Italy, on 13 December 2025 and was won by Effe, who stepped down as Mr Rubber Italy 2025 the evening before. The contestants were:

- Vaan – Rubber Spain Ambassador
- Effe – Mr Rubber Italy 2025
- Factemius – independent contestant (France)

=== Mr Rubber Europe 2027 ===
The Mr Rubber Europe 2027 contest was held in Amsterdam, Netherlands, on 17 October 2026 and was won by Michał (also known as Moon), a former Mr Rubber Poland titleholder. The contestants were:

- Spyder – Mr Rubber France 2026
- Daylon – Mr Rubber Netherlands 2026
- Leonardo – Mr Rubber Italy 2026
- Michał – Mr Rubber Poland 2025

== See also ==
- Mister Leather Europe
- International Mr Rubber
- International Mister Leather
- Rubber and PVC fetishism
- LGBT culture
