= Cloth diaper =

Diaper made from reusable materials

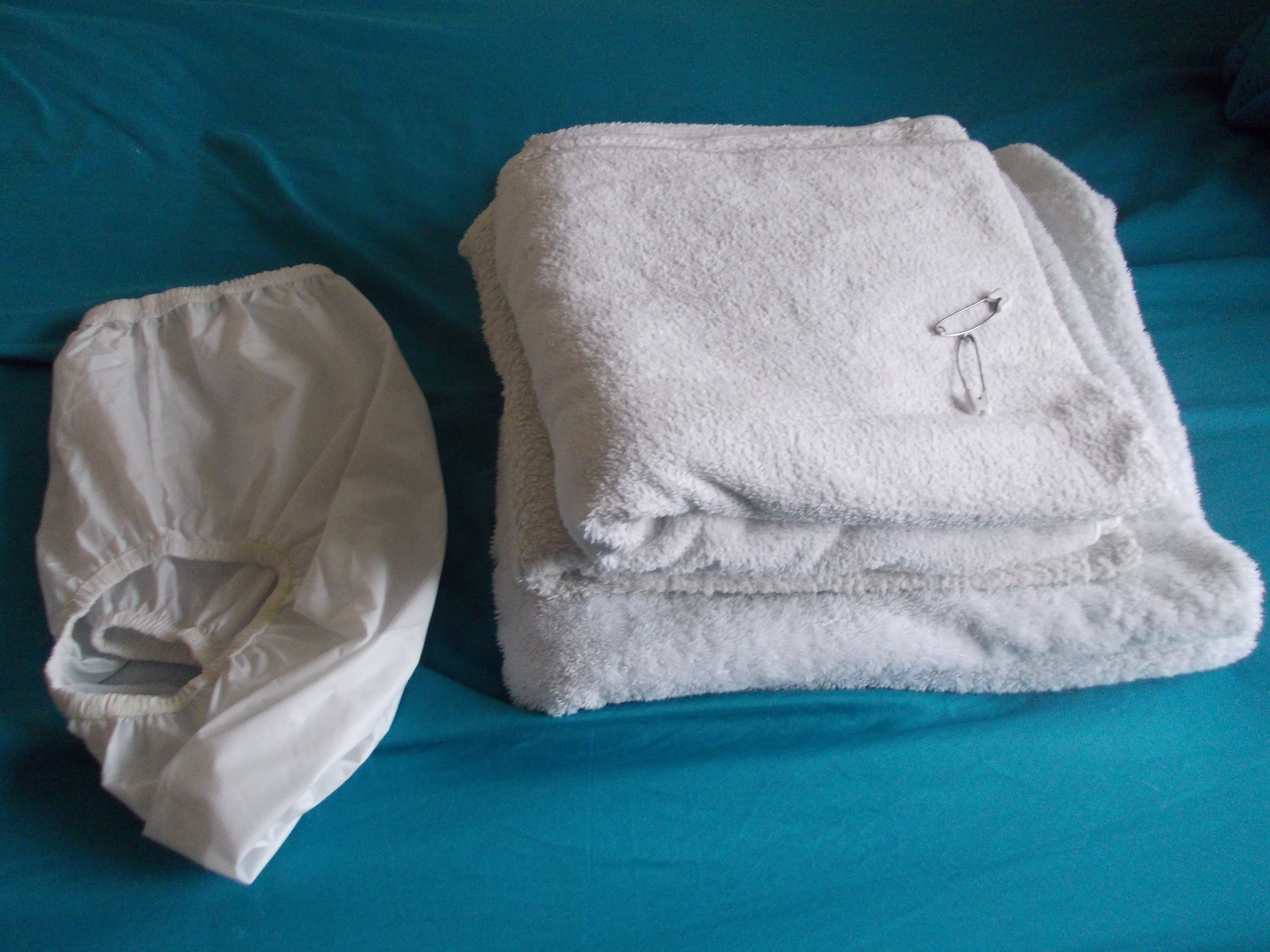
Traditional diaper cover (left) and "Flat" (right) with pins.

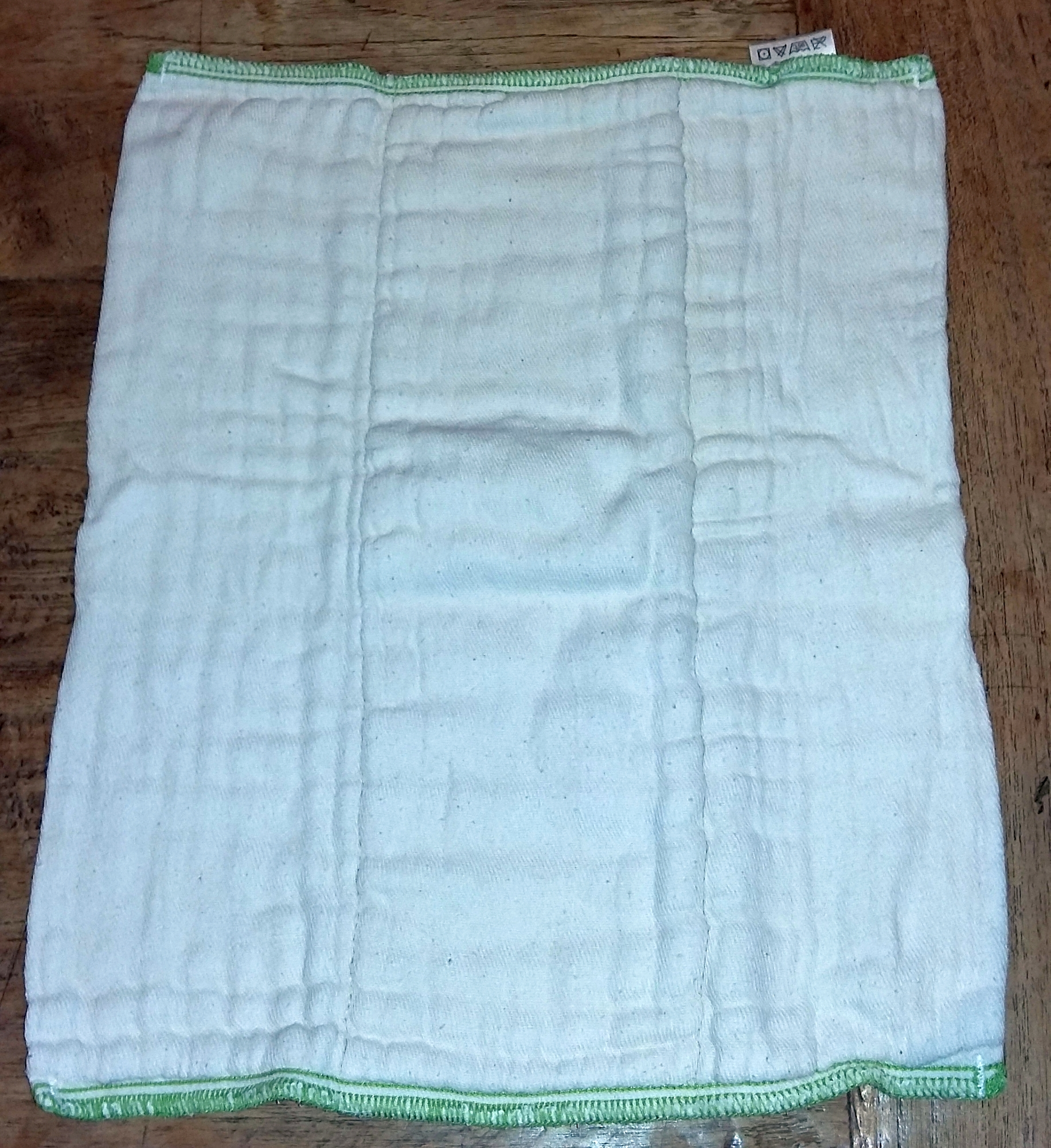
Prefold diaper

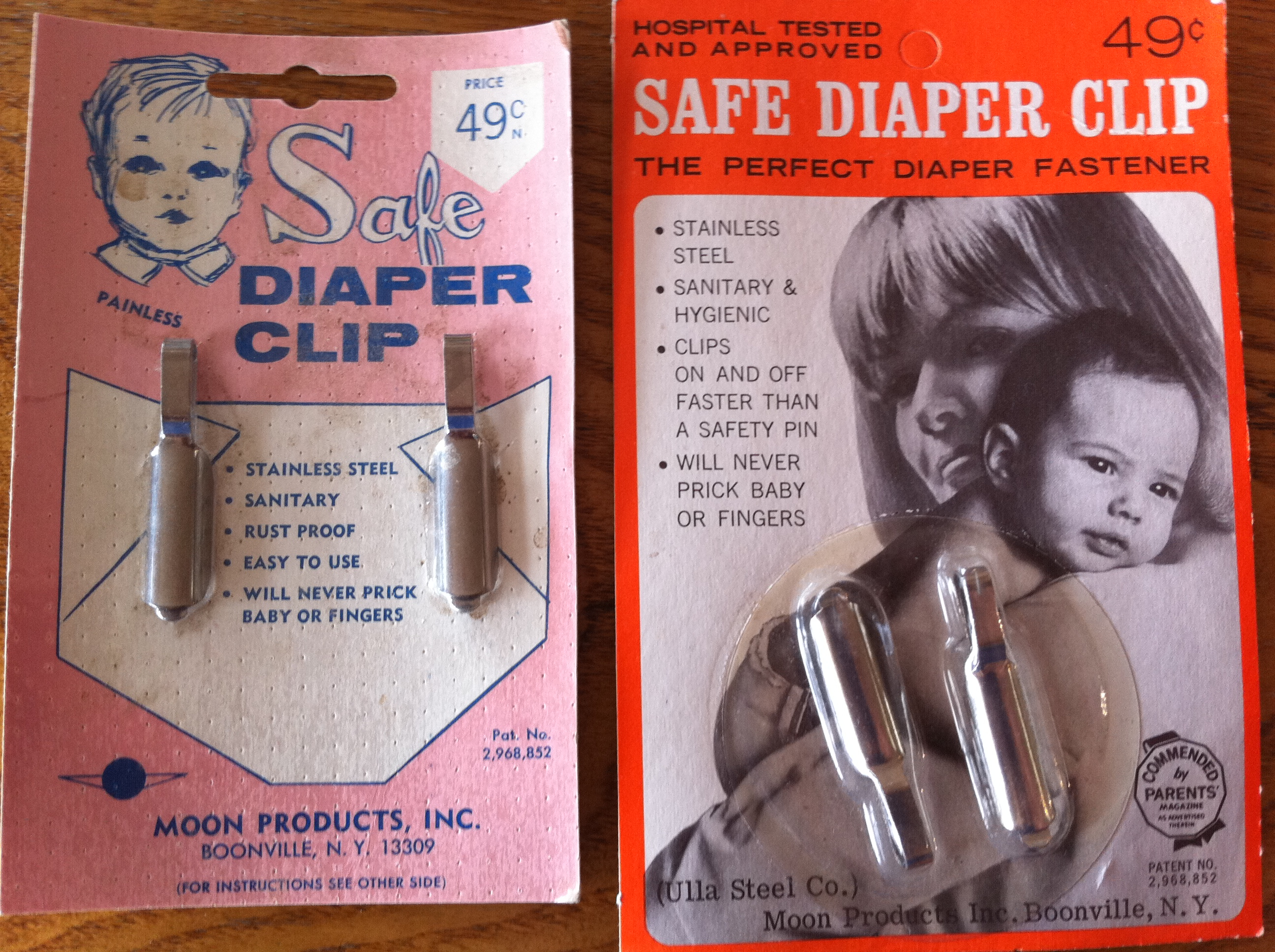
Safe Diaper Clip from mid-1960s.

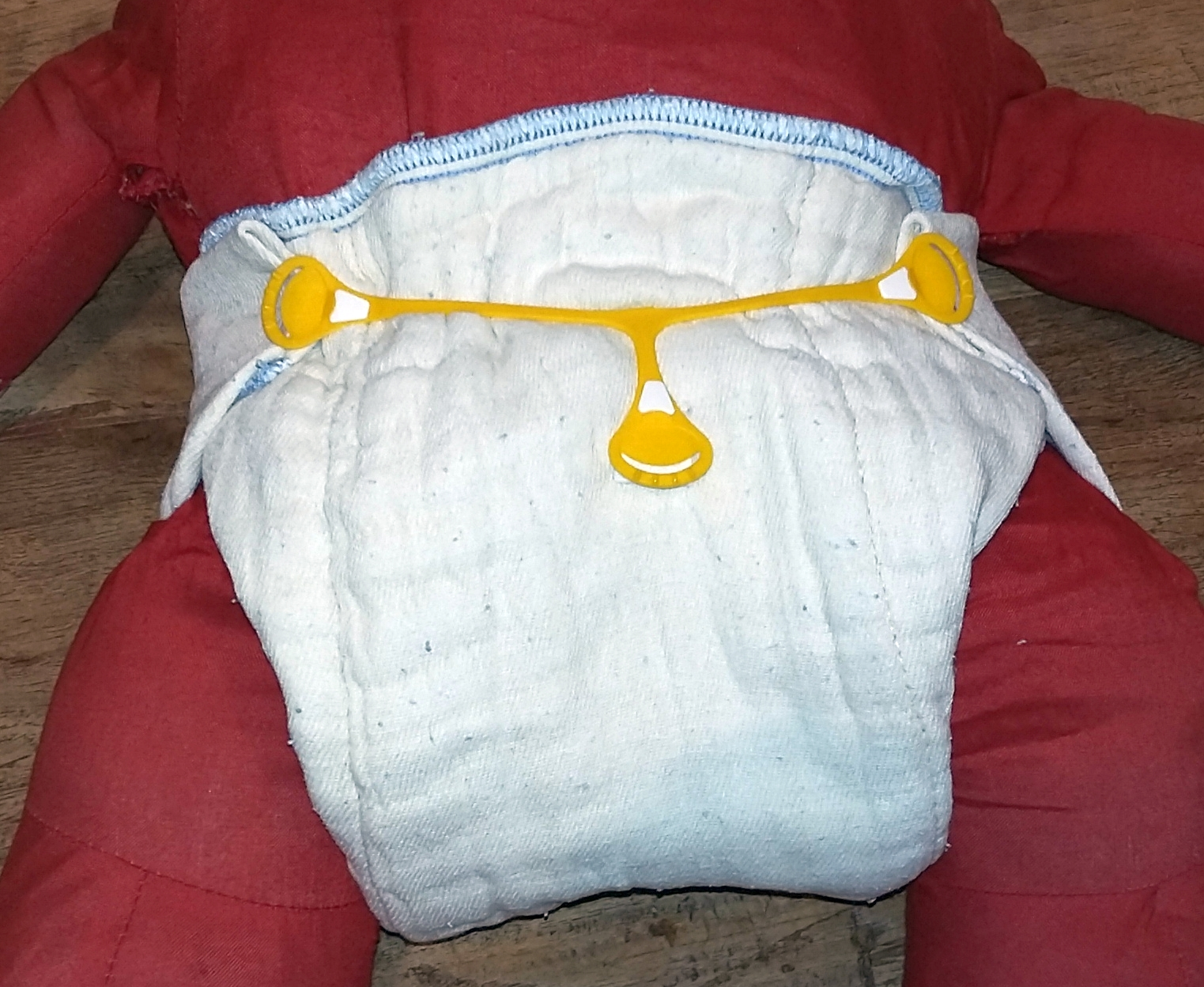
Prefold diaper on a doll. The prefold is closed with a plastic closure instead of traditional pins (Snappi).

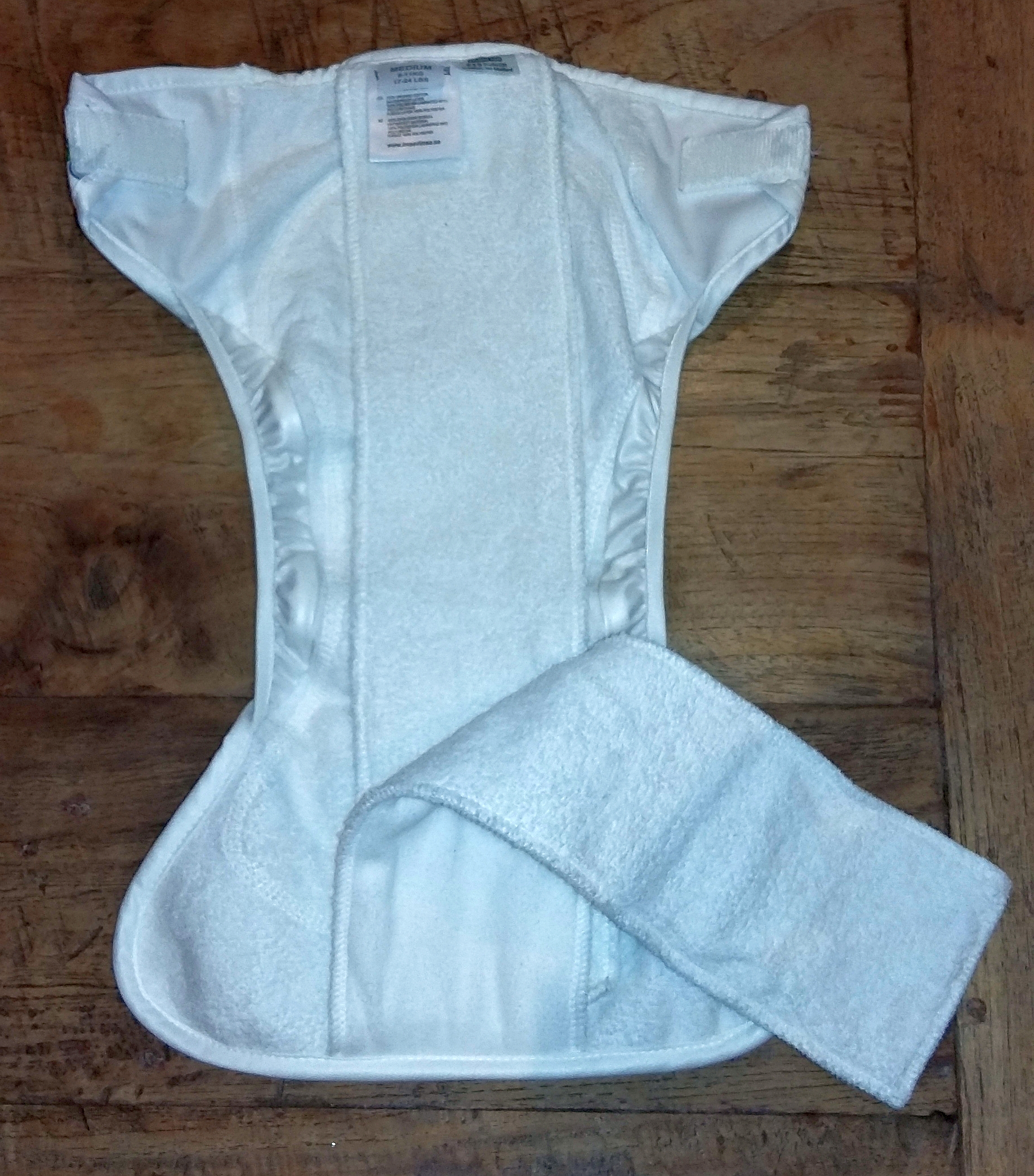
All in one diaper.

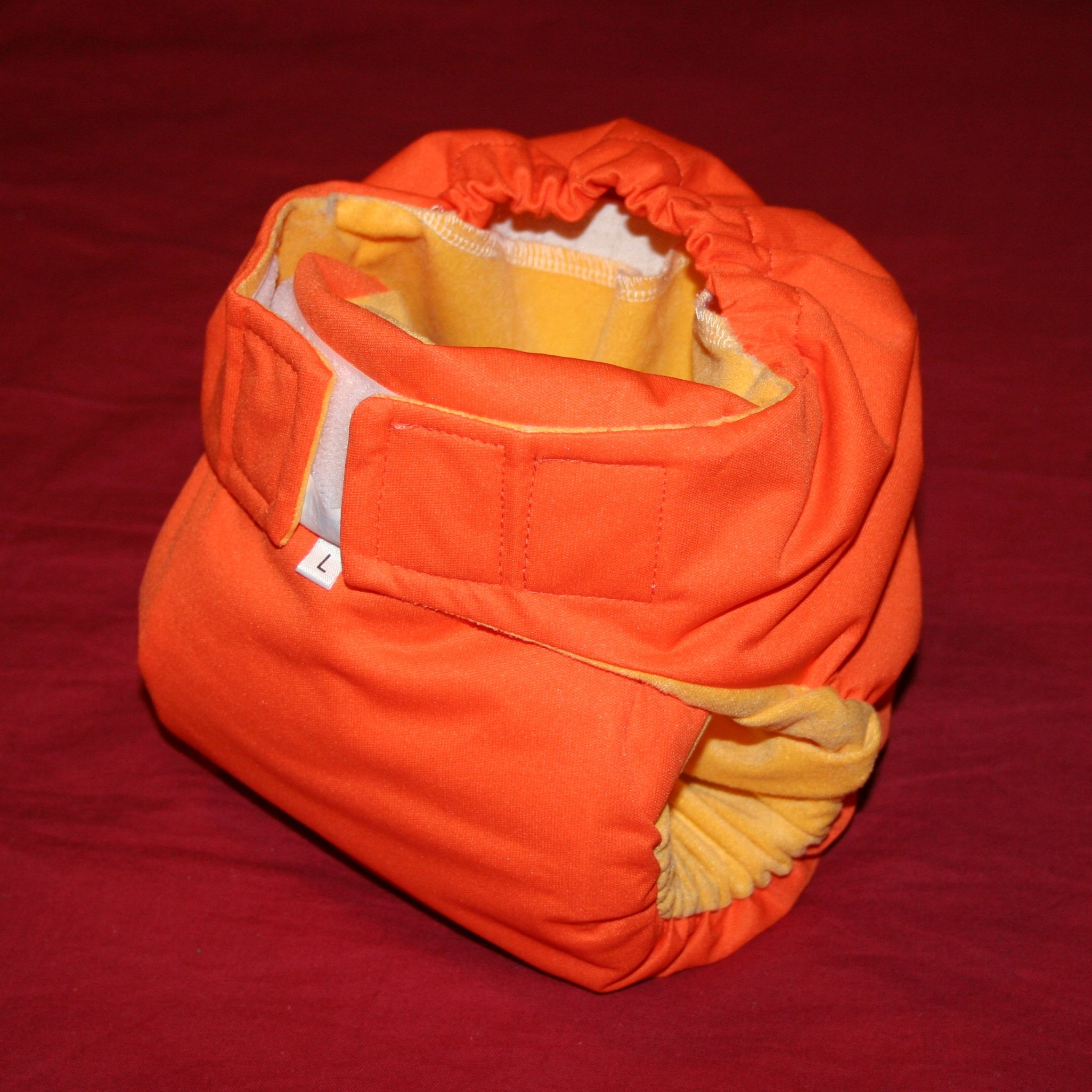
Pocket diaper with hook and loop closure

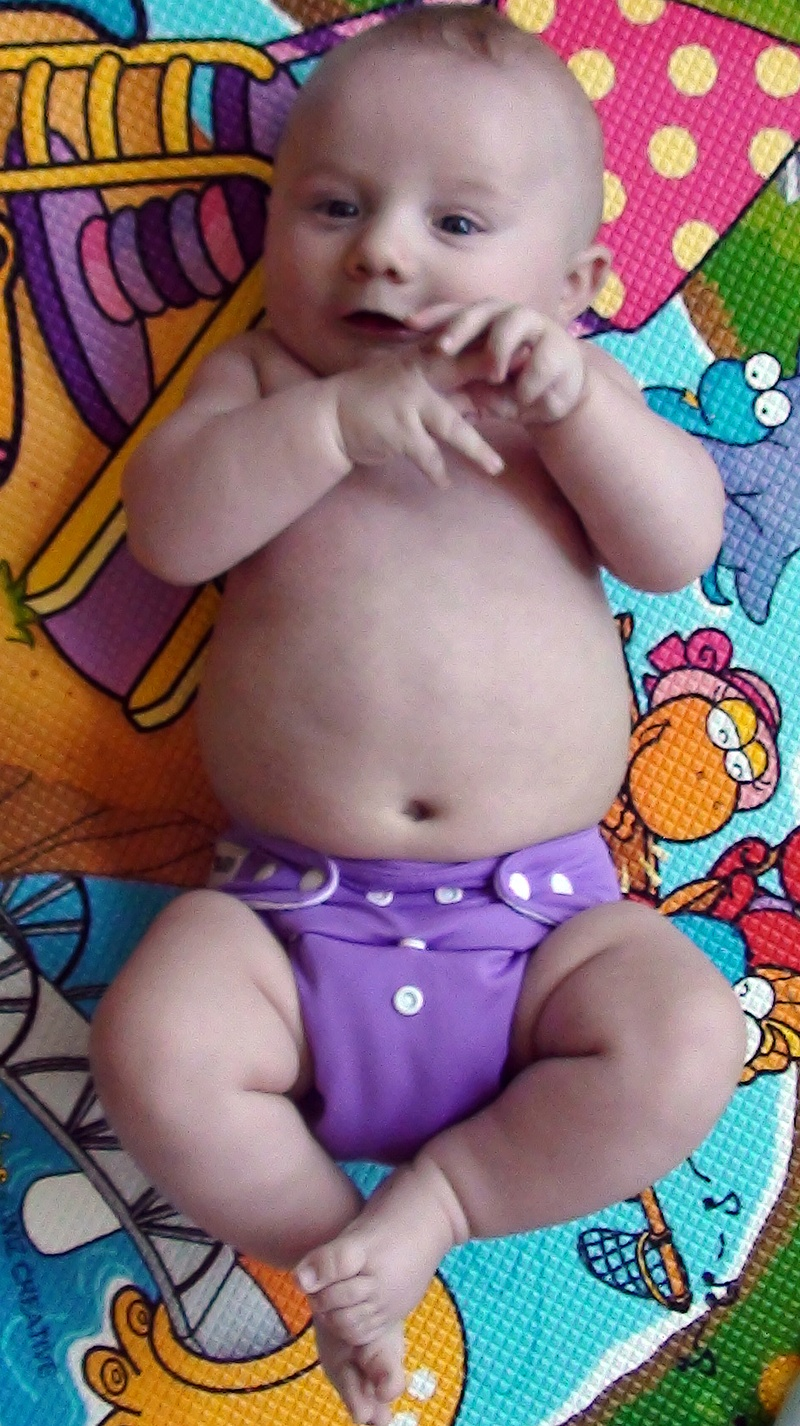
Baby wearing pocket diaper with snap closure

A cloth diaper (American English) or a cloth nappy (Australian English and British English), also known as reusable diaper or reusable nappy, is a diaper made from textiles such as natural fibers, human-made materials, or a combination of both. Cloth diapers are in contrast to disposable diapers, made from synthetic fibers and plastics. They are often made from industrial cotton which may be bleached white or left the fiber's natural color. Other natural fiber cloth materials include wool, bamboo, and unbleached hemp. Human-made materials such as an internal absorbent layer of microfiber toweling or an external waterproof layer of polyurethane laminate (PUL) may be used. Polyester fabrics microfleece or suedecloth are often used inside cloth diapers as a "stay-dry" wicking liner because of the non-absorbent properties of those synthetic fibers.

Modern cloth diapers come in a host of shapes. These shapes include preformed cloth diapers, all-in-one diapers with waterproof exteriors, fitted diaper with covers and pocket or "stuffable" diapers, which consist of a water-resistant outer shell sewn with an opening for insertion of absorbent material inserts.

== History ==
Traditionally, cloth diapers consisted of a folded square or rectangle of linen cloth, cotton flannel, or stockinette, which was fastened with safety pins. Today, this type of diaper is referred to as a flat. The flat was commonly used in the late 1800s in Europe and North America.

In the early part of the 20th century, cloth users were boiling diapers as they became aware of bacteria. During World War II, the increase of working mothers brought the need for the "diaper service". Fresh cotton diapers would be delivered on an as-needed basis.

In 1946, a Westport, Connecticut homemaker named Marion Donovan, invented the "Boater", a waterproof covering for cloth diapers. Marion was granted 4 patents for her designs, including the use of plastic snaps that replaced the traditional and dangerous "safety pins".

In 1950, the prefold diaper was invented by a diaper service owner and produced by Curity. The prefold diaper consisted of a standard "flat" diaper, but pre-folded and sewn together. Also in 1950, the Safe-T Di-Dee diaper was invented. The diaper was preformed and was the first pinless, snap-on diaper- this was the first fitted diaper. It was invented by Sybil Geeslin (Kennedy) who subsequently sold the patent. They were then sold as Keystone Safe-T Di-Dee Diapers and were nationally distributed.

In the 1960s, the disposable diaper rapidly took hold and cloth diaper use fell out of favor. In the late 1980s, cloth diaper users re-emerged with environmental issues concerning the use of disposables. By the late 1990s and the beginning of the next decade, many large cloth diaper manufacturing companies were well established.

The EU and UK market was slower to get started than the US, with a few domestic manufacturers such as Earthwise and Snugglenaps being established in the late 1990s, alongside importers of brands such as Motherease, Bummis and Kooshies. The first multi-brand ecommerce online shop was opened by Twinkleontheweb, with others following on. The Real Nappy Association was formed by members of WEN the Women's Environmental Network, with the first Real Nappy Week being held in 1997 to promote the use of cloth diapers in the UK.

== Cloth diaper types ==
- Covers or wraps- Covers, also called wraps, are waterproof coverings for diapers that are not waterproof on their own. Covers must be used with all of the following diapers:
  - Flats or cloth squares –Flat diapers are a large, single layer, square or rectangle of absorbent cloth. Bird's-eye cotton or muslin are the most commonly used materials, but flats can also be made of terry cloth or of flannel. Any absorbent material may be considered a "flat" if it is composed of one single layer. Flats may or may not be hemmed or otherwise finished at the edges. Caregivers must fold flats into the desired shape before they are usable as a diaper.
  - Prefolds – A prefold is a rectangular piece of absorbent fabric that has been folded, layered, and then sewn so that the center strip of the diaper has more layers of absorbent material than the sides. This reduces bulk while still providing enough absorbency where it is needed. Prefolds get their name because before their invention, flats were the common diaper type available. Flats require folding in order to obtain the appropriate number of layers of absorbent material in the wet zone. Manufacturers pre-fold "prefolds" and sew them down so that less folding is required at the time of the diaper change. Prefolds typically have 4 to 6 layers of material in the center and 2 to 4 layers on the edges.
  - Shaped diapers – Shaped diapers resemble a prefold except, instead of the square shape, they are a triangular, T-shaped, X-shaped, or Y-shaped. They are not commonly used today as contour diapers have generally replaced them. Even so, prefolds (the rectangle shape) remain the most popular pre-folded diaper of the three (prefolds, shaped diapers, and contours).
  - Contours – Contoured diapers are much like a shaped diaper or prefold except they are cut and sewn into a general hourglass shape. This is done so that no folding is required before they are ready to be used as a diaper - and also to reduce bulkiness.
  - Fitteds – Fitted diapers are hourglass-shaped absorbent diapers that have elastic at the legs in order to better contain feces and urine. They usually also have a built in closure - such as velcro or snaps - that is used to secure the diaper onto the baby. There are several subtypes of fitted diapers including closureless fitteds (those that lack velcro or snaps), prefitteds (fitteds made from pre-fold diapers), and pocket fitteds (pocket diapers that use absorbent materials for all the layers instead of wicking or waterproof materials). Fitteds are popular today, particularly for use overnight, when a diaper capable of holding more urine without leaking is needed.
- Pocket diapers – Pocket diapers are hourglass-shaped and have closures to secure them onto the baby (generally snaps or velcro). They consist of a waterproof outer layer and an inner layer that are sewn together on three sides to create a pocket. The inner layer may be made of a moisture-wicking material or an absorbent material. The pocket is then stuffed with absorbent insert that can be customized based on the absorbency level required for each baby. The most common inserts are made of microfiber, bamboo or charcoal bamboo. One subtype of pocket diapers is the sleeve diaper, which is sewn only on two sides instead of three so that the pocket may be accessed from both the front and back of the diaper.
- All-in-one diaper – An all in one (AIO) diaper consists of a waterproof outer layer sewn together with absorbent material on the inside. There may also be an additional inner layer of moisture-wicking material. All-in-ones are hourglass-shaped and have a velcro, snap, or other closure to secure them on the baby.
- All-in-two diaper – An all-in-two- diaper (AI2) is a diaper with two parts. Such diapers consists of a waterproof diaper-cover with fasteners and an absorbent insert. The insert is a rectangle or hourglass pad of absorbent material, that may or may not have a moisture-wicking material as its top layer. The insert snaps or lays into the cover and may be removed when soiled or wet. The cover may be reused throughout the day by replacing the insert at each change.
- Hybrid diapers - A hybrid diaper is similar to an all-in-two diaper in that it is typically composed of a waterproof diaper cover and an absorbent insert. The reason for the "hybrid" name is that the same waterproof diaper-cover can be used with a cloth absorbent insert or with a disposable insert.

Liners may also be used to protect the diaper or nappy from solids. These are typically disposable but can be reusable.

- Reusable diaper liners - Made from natural materials, such as cotton, bamboo and hemp.
- Disposable diaper liners -

== List of cloth diaper accessories ==
- Changing table
- Diaper bag
- Plastic pants
- Rubber pants
- Safety pins
