= Photo Bits =

British softcore pornography magazine (1898–1914)

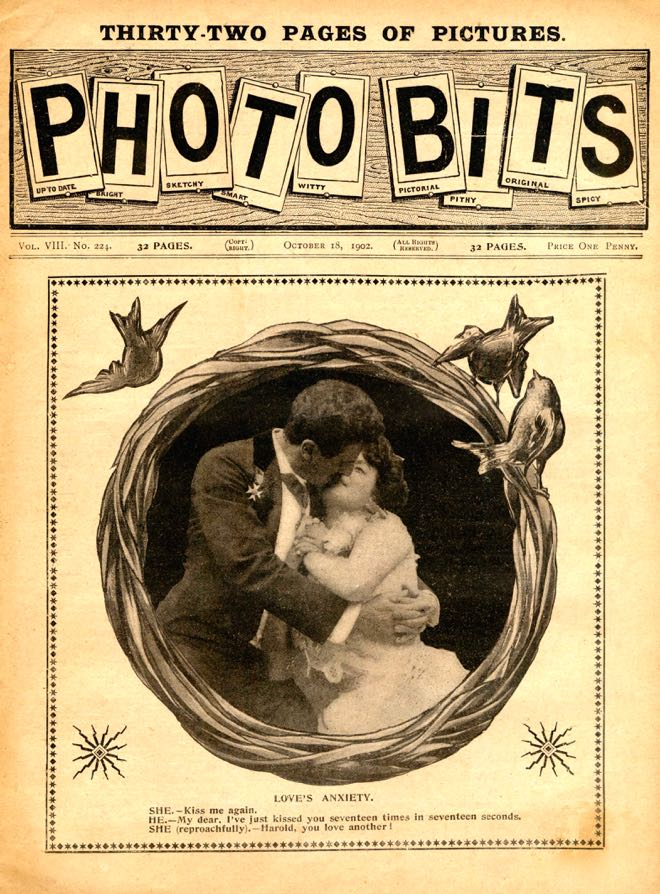
- Cover of 18 October 1902 edition
- Categories: Softcore pornography
- Frequency: Weekly
- First issue: 9 July 1898
- Final issue: 9 December 1914
- Country: United Kingdom
- Language: English

Photo Bits was a British softcore pornographic magazine that was published weekly. It was founded in 9 July 1898 and ran until 9 December 1914. It was mentioned in James Joyce's Ulysses. The magazine was long targeted by hostile forces concerned about social "purity". The editor of the magazine faced arrest and prosecution. The magazine was later renamed Bits of Fun. Photo Bits was completely different from other magazines or papers of that time and was classified as a "comic" paper in contemporary press directories. It was the United Kingdom's first pin-up magazine.

The contents of the magazine generally included one serial story written by Derk Fortesque, multiple short stories, different comic pieces, and photographs, drawings and sketches of clothed and nude showgirls and stars of the theater world. Photo Bits also featured a weekly article discussing miscellaneous aspects of the show business, written by some anonymous person before 11 January 1908, by a person with the pseudonym 'The Amorist' after that date, and by an American who used the pseudonym 'Cosmopolite' from 23 July 1910. The contribution of 'The Amorist' towards the development of the magazine was the introduction of tight lacing and high heels subjects. Cosmopolite introduced a new feature by inviting readers to write to him about their fetishes. In early 1912, Derk Fortesque died, and 'Cosmopolite' left the magazine. As a result, the character of the magazine changed. The Photo Bits was involved in publishing fetishist literature. The serial story "Peggy Paget's Patent Paralyzing Pedal Props" was published in the magazine in 1910. The magazine also featured 18-inch high-heel fetish shoes.

Photo Bits is regarded as a direct predecessor to London Life, which became a fetish magazine in the years 1926 to 1941.
