= London Life (fetish magazine) =

Fetish magazine published in the 20th century

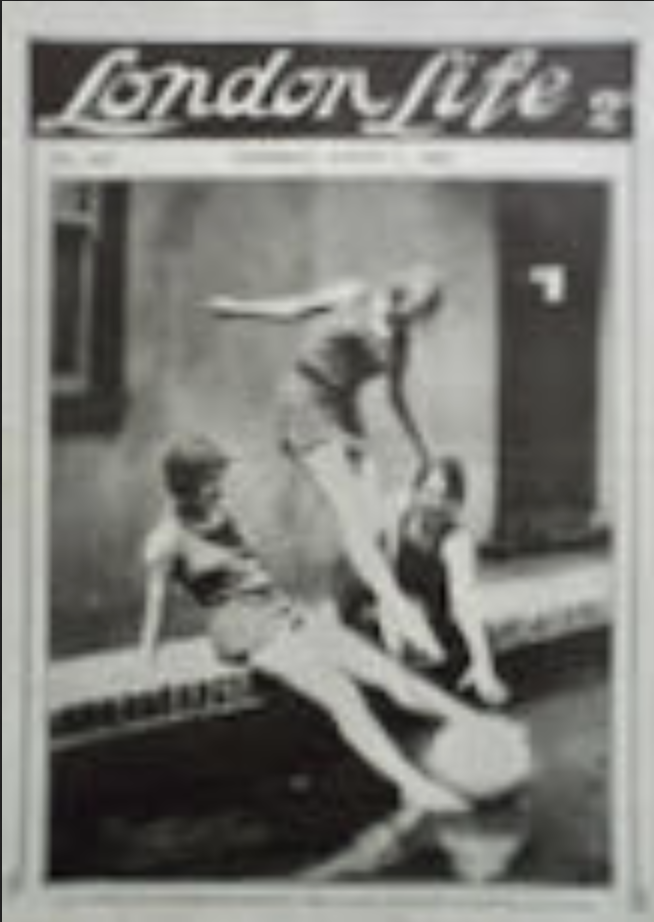
Front cover of London Life, 8 August 1926

London Life was a British fetish magazine that flourished in the period between World War I and World War II. It was the product of the merger of predecessor magazines including Photo Bits. In the years between 1923 and 1941, in addition to glamour photographs, popular culture and celebrity gossip, the magazine contained material on a wide variety of fetish topics, including bondage, tight-lacing, rubberism and human ponies, as well as a readers' letters section in which these topics were discussed.

During this period, the magazine had an active role in creating connections in the worldwide fetish community. The artist John Alexander Scott Coutts, better known as John Willie, was inspired by London Life to publish his own fetish magazine, Bizarre.

London Life ceased to contain fetish content after 1941, but continued to be published until 1960.

The Kinsey Institute for Research in Sex, Gender, and Reproduction holds a collection of issues of both London Life and its predecessor Photo Bits.
