= Plastic pants =

Device worn over a diaper

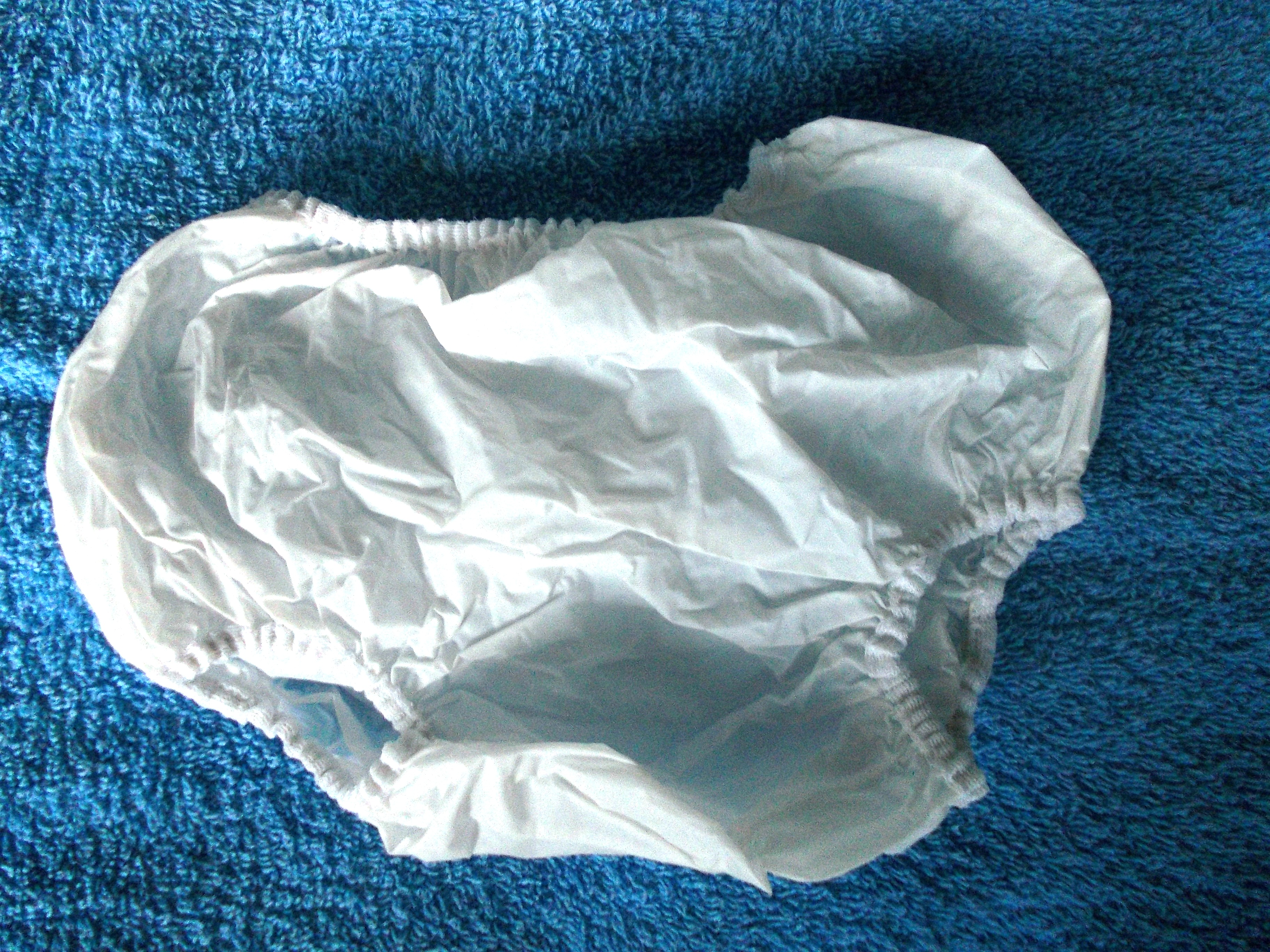
Plastic pants

Plastic pants (also known as waterproof pants, plastic panties, diaper covers, nappy covers, dry joggers, nappy wraps, wraps, or pilchers) are garments worn over a diaper to prevent liquid or solid waste from leaking through the fabric. They are waterproof with a plastic texture, rather than a soft napkin texture. Plastic pants are usually made out of polyvinyl chloride (PVC) or polyurethane (PU).

Since the 1950s, it can be used by those with continence problems. Some plastic pants have elasticated legs and waists, while others have poppers or snaps on the side.

== History ==
Originally, diaper covers were crafted from oiled wool. During the early 20th century, oiled silk was utilized as a waterproofing agent in adult clothing. The popularity of wearing protective garments increased with the widespread availability of latex rubber in the 1920s. For managing heavy menstruation cycles, the panties were equipped with a waterproof latex crotch insert or a waterproof panel at the back of an underskirt.

In the 1950s, plastics, particularly PVC, replaced latex due to their lower cost, maintenance, and noise during handling. Though modern terminology, like "rubber pants" and "rubbers", is commonly used to refer to various types of waterproof pants.

The introduction of lighter, less bulky, and often incorporated integral waterproof plastic backing superabsorbent polymers, along with blood-gelling polymers for sanitary pads, significantly displaced traditional pads.

== Effectiveness ==
Until the late 1950s, infants of both sexes usually wore short dresses until they were ready for toilet training, thus avoiding the risks to clothing and hygiene of having top clothes in prolonged close contact with the diaper.

== See also ==
- Rubber pants
- Cloth diaper
