= PVC clothing =

Clothing made from PVC fabric

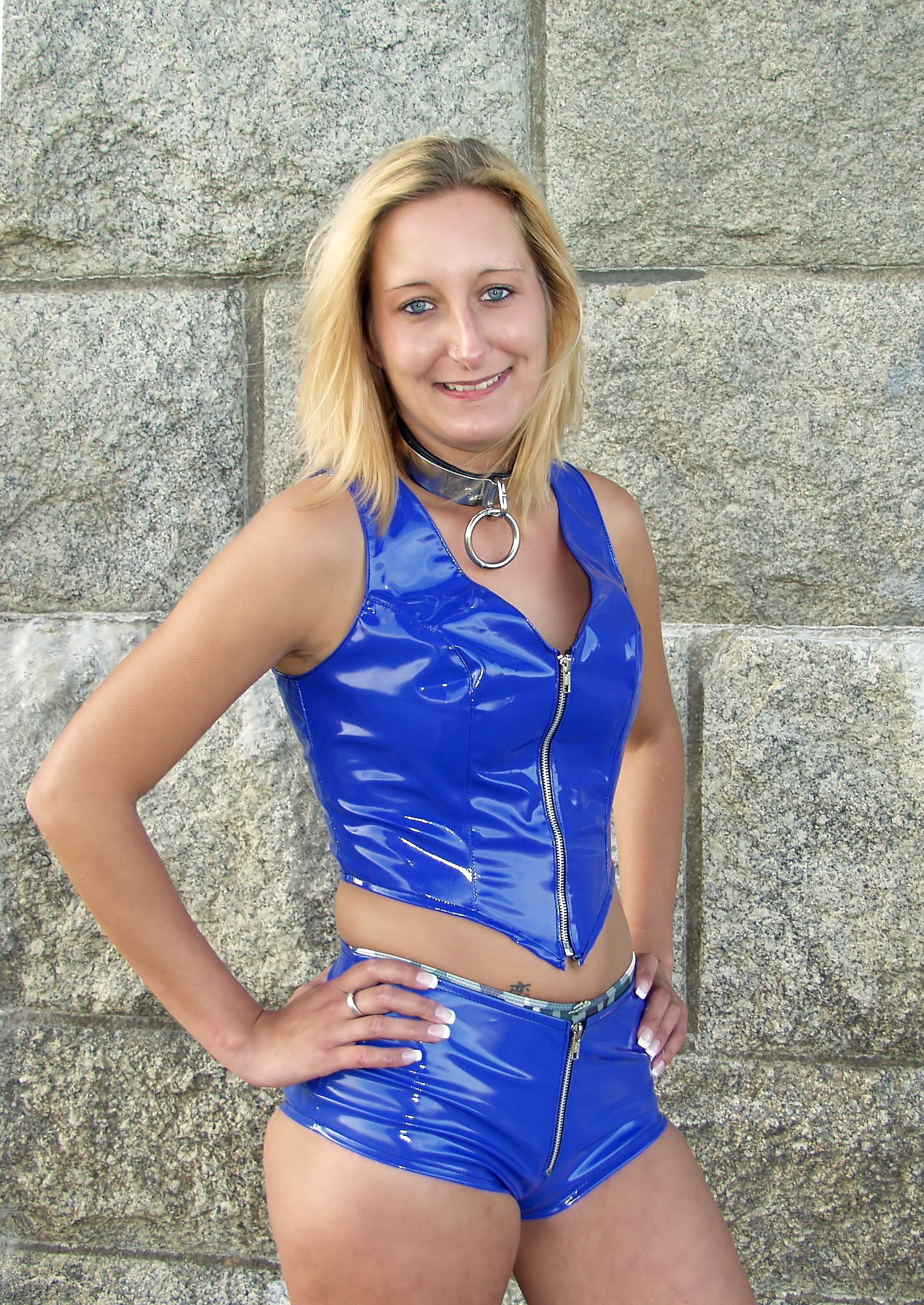
Woman in blue PVC shorts and top

PVC clothing is shiny clothing made from the plastic polyvinyl chloride (PVC). PVC plastic is often called "vinyl" and this type of clothing is commonly known as vinyl clothing. PVC is sometimes confused with the similarly shiny patent leather.

The terms "PVC", "vinyl" and "PU" tend to be used interchangeably by retailers for clothing made from shiny plastic-coated fabrics. These fabrics usually consist of a backing woven from polyester fibers with a surface coating of shiny plastic. The plastic layer itself is typically a blend of PVC and polyurethane (PU), with 100% PVC producing a stiff fabric with a glossy shine and 100% PU producing a stretchy fabric with a silky shine (see PU laminate). A manufacturer's label may say, for example, 67% polyester, 33% polyurethane for a fabric that contains no PVC; or 80% polyvinyl chloride, 20% polyurethane with mention of the polyester backing omitted. PVC clothing is a highly resistant material and waterproof. PVC can be produced in bright colors (black, red, white, blue, orange, pink, silver, striped, etc.), adding visual appeal to the physical sensations produced by wearing the material.

== History ==
Plastics have been used in clothing since their invention, particularly in raincoats. The use of PVC in clothing became established during the fashion trends of the 1960s and early 1970s. The fashion designers of the time regarded PVC as the ideal material with which to design futuristic clothes. Boots, raincoats, dresses and other PVC garments were made in diverse colors as well as transparent, and to some degree they were worn in public. PVC clothes were often seen in films and TV series such as The Avengers. Shiny plastic clothing has since become the object of PVC fetishism.

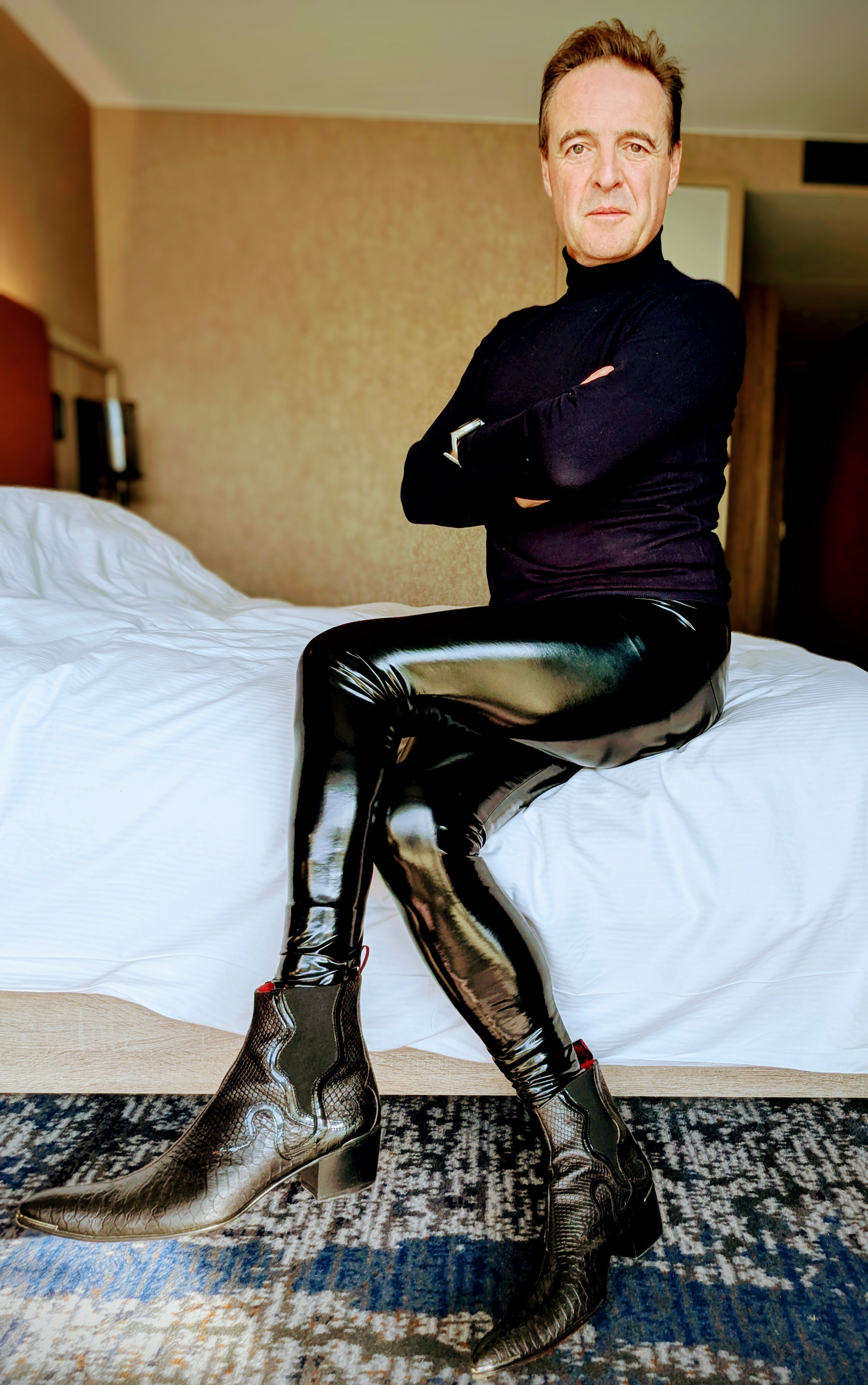
British historian Guy Walters wearing black PVC leggings

In the mid-late 1990s, clothes made of PVC became a part of young people's fashions, particularly in jackets, skirts and trousers, and they also appeared in the media. During the mid-late 1990s it was not uncommon to see presenters, models, actresses, actors, singers and other celebrities wearing PVC clothes on TV and in magazines. As the fashion cycle continues, PVC clothing has again appeared in mainstream street fashion and it continues to be a central part of the fetish scene.

Fashion designers such as Jean Paul Gaultier, Yves Saint Laurent, Pierre Cardin and André Courrèges have used PVC in their collections. PVC has been used for both female and male fashion.

== Caring for PVC clothing ==
PVC clothing requires care to make it last longer and maintain its appearance.

As PVC clothes are made from a fabric layer covered with a plastic layer, they should not be over-stretched to avoid damage to the plastic layer. Excessive stretching can cause the plastic layer to lose its smooth texture and stay striated, lose some of its original shine, and possibly tear.

If PVC clothing is not soiled, the inside can be freshened up with a fabric refresher product and the plastic outside can be wiped with a damp sponge. If necessary, PVC clothes can be hand washed with warm water and a small amount of liquid detergent. Washing powder should not be used because the flakes can remain on the clothing after washing, and can also stick to the plastic layer.

The detergent can be removed using cold water and after turning the garment inside out it can be left in the shade to dry. After drying the inside (fabric layer), a garment can be turned to dry the outside (plastic layer).

PVC clothing is damaged by ironing. It is made of heat-sensitive plastics and which may melt under the iron, and high temperatures from any source, such as flames, clothes dryers, and cigarettes can damage it. The fumes from burning or smoking PVC plastic can also damage it.

Different colored PVC garments, especially white, may be subject to staining if they are not stored separately from each other. PVC clothing is usually stored hanging in a garment bag away from other clothing.

The polyester fabric used for backing PVC clothing is more resistant to wear and tear than rubber, and PVC clothing does not require the use of any shining products. However, it is possible to polish PVC clothing using liquid silicone spray sold by car accessory shops.

== In popular culture ==
- In a scene from the film Two for the Road (1967), the actress Audrey Hepburn appears wearing a shiny black PVC trouser suit designed by Michele Rosier.
- In the music video for "Scream" (1995), Michael Jackson and his sister Janet Jackson wore black PVC pants.
- In 101 Dalmatians and 102 Dalmatians, Cruella (played by Glenn Close) wears red PVC thigh high boots, black PVC crotch boots, and a black PVC belt.
- In 2007, the Brazilian singer Ivete Sangalo wore a black PVC outfit in her show Multishow ao Vivo: Ivete no Maracanã.

== Gallery ==
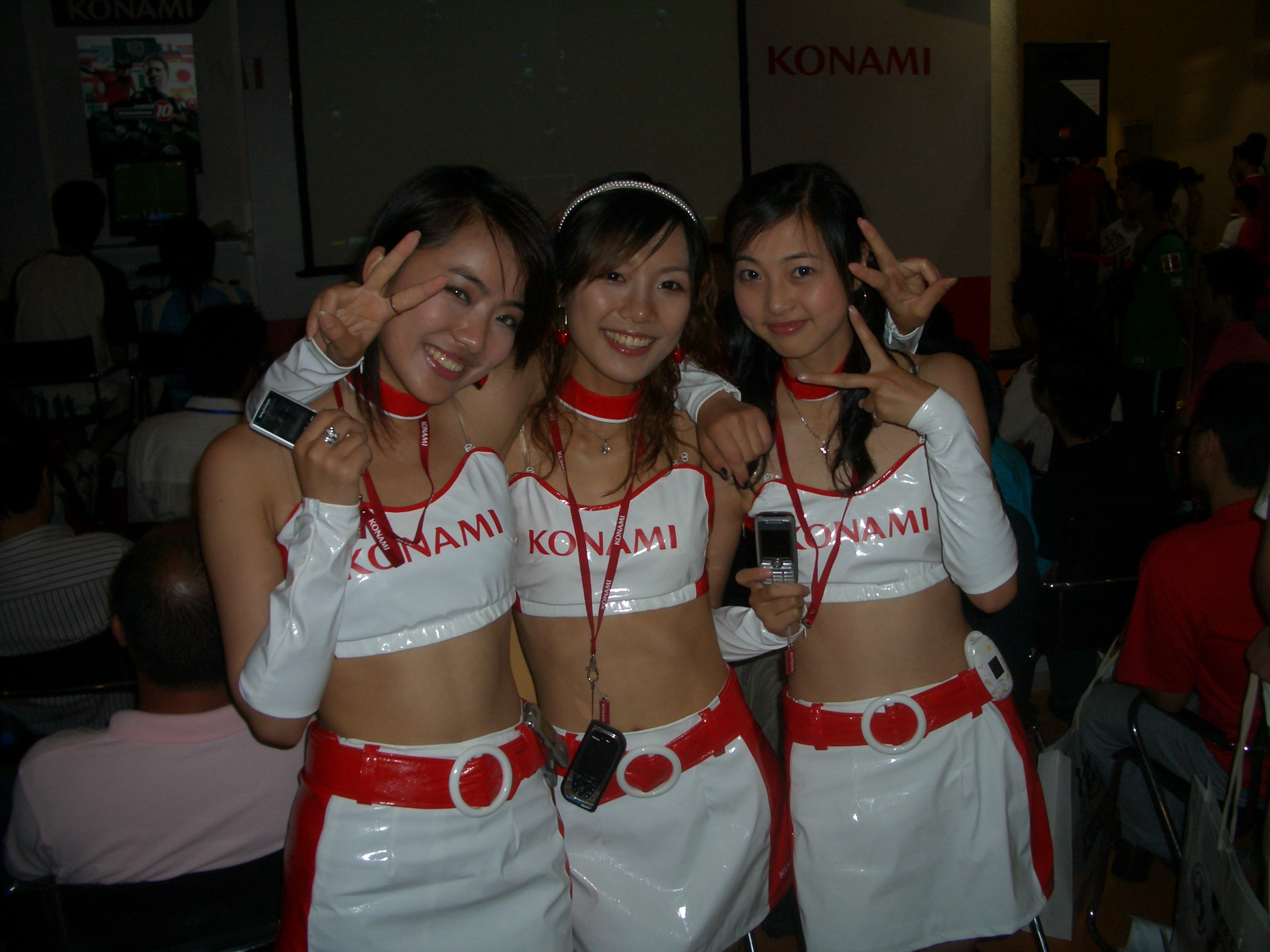
Women in white and red PVC skirts and tops

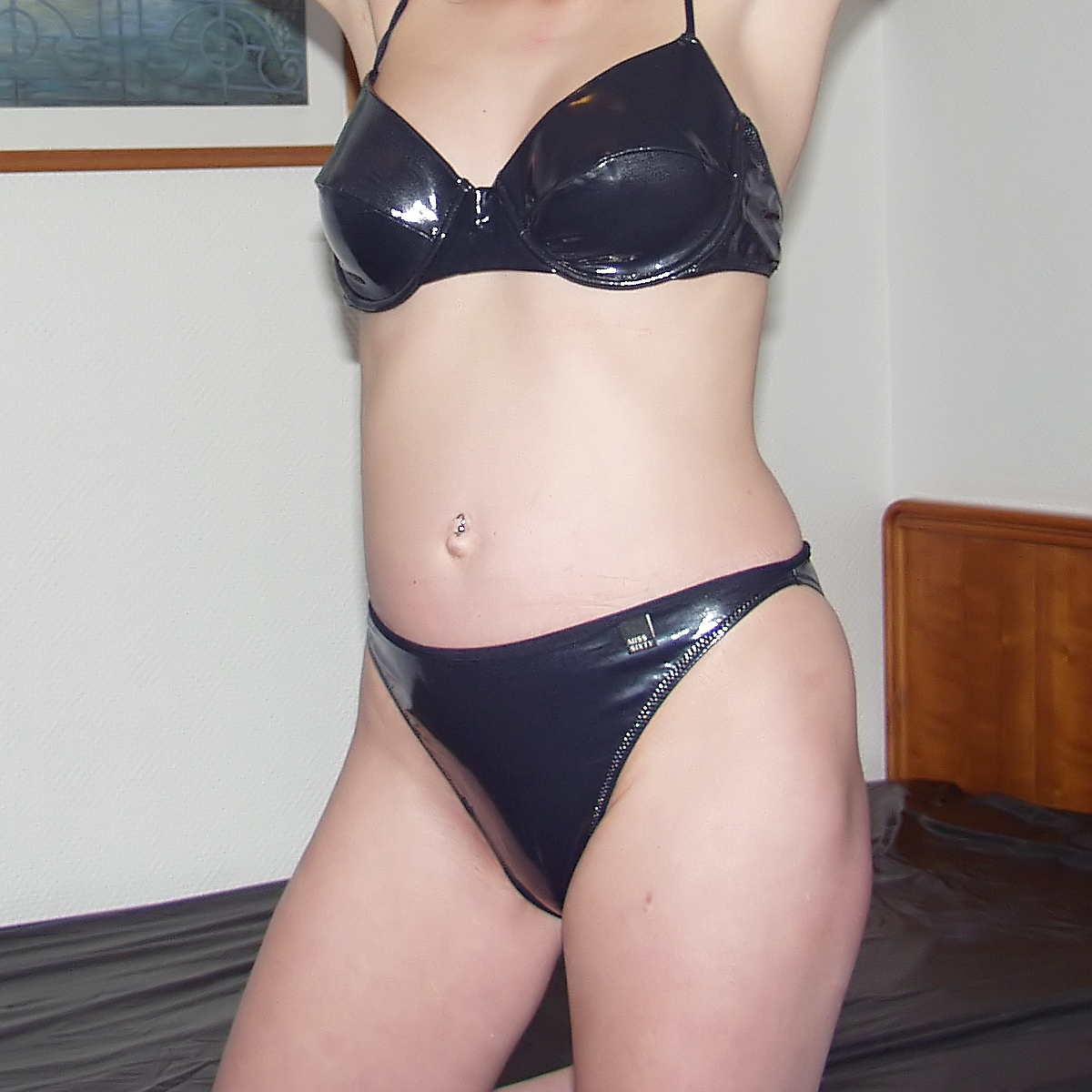
Woman wearing a black PVC bikini

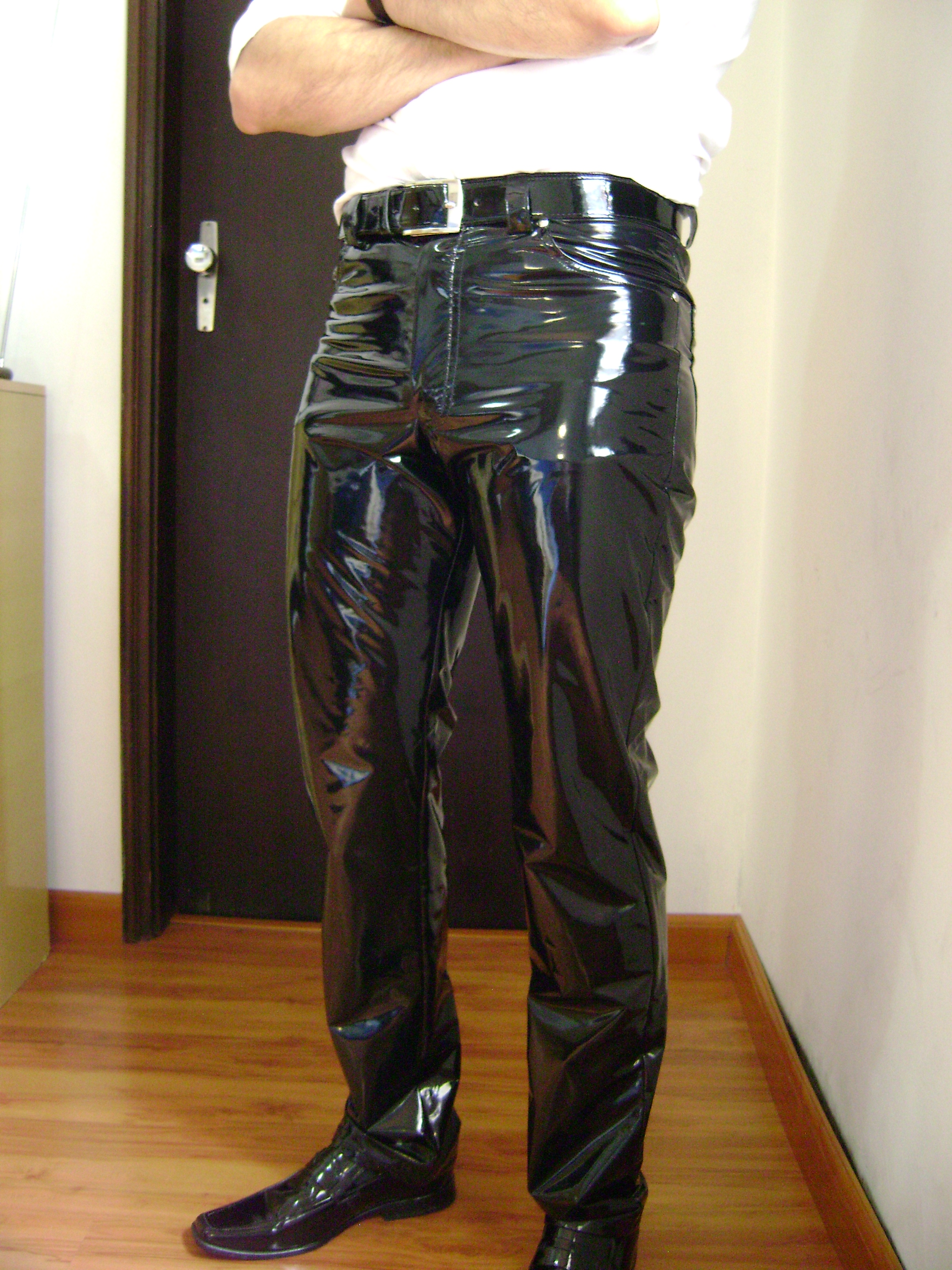
Men's black PVC pants

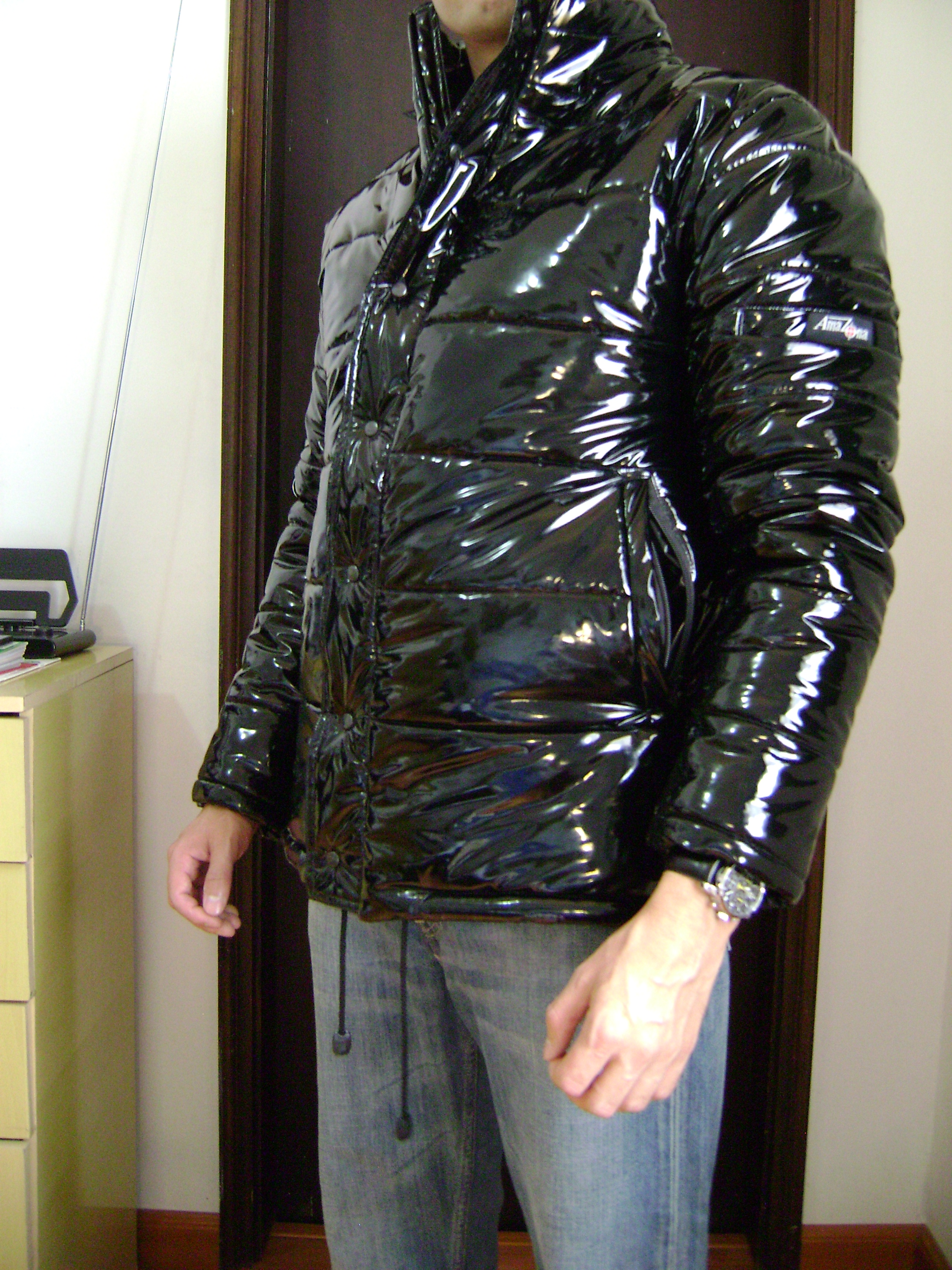
Men's black PVC down jacket

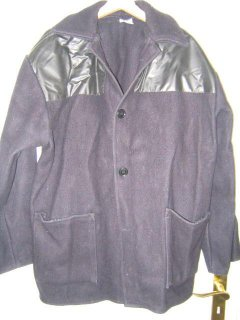
Donkey jackets usually have PVC shoulders

== See also ==
- 1960s in fashion
- Catsuits and bodysuits in popular media
- Latex clothing
- Plastic clothing
