= MIR contest =

International rubber subculture event

MIR
- Rubber Pride Flag
- Status: Active
- Genre: Rubber, Fetish, Kink
- Frequency: Annually
- Location: Chicagoland
- Country: United States
- Inaugurated: 1997
- Most recent: November 5-8, 2026
- Organiser: MIR Contest, NPO
- Website: mirubber.com

MIR, formerly Mr. International Rubber, is a multi-day convention and contest celebrating the rubber, fetish, and kink communities. Established in 1997, MIR occurs annually in Chicagoland during the autumn, drawing participants and attendees from all over the world. With a format analogous to International Mr. Leather, events at MIR include workshops, socials, dances, a kink market, and the title contest.

== History ==
The inaugural MIR contest was held in 1997 at Cell Block, a gay bar in Boystown. At the time, the event weekend included the competition, a vendor market, and after-hours events, and it was underwritten directly by the bar.

In 2009, MIR was purchased to operate as a dedicated LLC and moved to the Center on Halsted to account for larger crowds, with more than 600 attendees that year. This move enabled expansion of the contest and vendor space, as well as introducing off-site after-hours parties at additional local gay bars and bathhouses.

In 2020 MIR 24 was held virtually due to the COVID-19 pandemic, with events focused on educational workshops and webinars. No title competition was held.

At MIR 27 in 2023, organizers announced that the event would allow contestants of all genders to compete; the contest winner may chose whichever honorific best represents them as MIR titleholder: Mr. International Rubber, Ms. International Rubber, Mx. International Rubber, or MIR International Rubber Ambassador. To promote inclusion, organizers also changed the official name of the contest from "Mr. International Rubber" to gender-neutral "MIR".

MIR 27 and 28 were held in Skokie, Illinois. MIR 29 was held at the Hilton Rosemont/Chicago O'Hare to accommodate increased attendance and further expansion of the vendor space, with MIR reporting approximately 1,500 attendees.

In 2026, MIR returned to Chicago for its thirtieth anniversary contest.

== Title contest ==
=== Eligibility ===
As of 2026, to qualify for MIR, prospective contestants must be 18 years of age or older. Contestants may be of any gender.

Sponsorship or a title from a preliminary contest are not required to compete for MIR.

=== Winners ===
As of October 2025, 28 contestants representing nine countries have won MIR: the United States (15), Canada (5), Germany (2), the Netherlands (2), Australia (1), France (1), Italy (1), Poland (1), and the United Kingdom (1).

Below is a table of MIR contest winners. Winner's Country as used in the table refers to the winner's country of residence at the time they won the competition.

Year	Class	Winner	Preliminary Title / Sponsor	Winner's Country	Ref.
2026	MIR 30	Drone Diaries		United States	
2025	MIR 29	Elliott Eve	Mx. Melbourne Rubber 2024	Australia	
2024	MIR 28	Rush	Mr. San Francisco Rubber 2024	United States	
2023	MIR 27	AJ Huff	Mr. San Francisco Rubber 2020	United States	
2022	MIR 26	Pusckatt Pumera ONYX	Mr. Florida Rubber 2022	United States	
2021	MIR 25	ChicagoRubber		United States	
2020	MIR 24	Event was virtual and no MIR titleholder was selected.			
2019	MIR 23	Adalberto Rubadam	Mr. Rubber Netherlands 2019	Netherlands	
2018	MIR 22	Guillaume Dupuis	M. Rubber Montréal 2018	Canada	
2017	MIR 21	Michal Neighbour	Mr. Rubber Poland 2017	Poland	
2016	MIR 20	Preston "Wexx" So	Mr. New England Rubber 2016	United States	
2015	MIR 19	Jeffrey "Gummibärchen" Basile	Mr. Midwest Rubber 2015	United States	
2014	MIR 18	Max Samauth	Mr. Rubber Netherlands 2014	Netherlands	
2013	MIR 17	Andy "CosmicRoo" Coatham	Mr. Rubber Toronto 2013	Canada	
2012	MIR 16	Rubber Jason	Mr. New England Rubber 2012	United States	
2011	MIR 15	Sly Hands	Mr. Rubber UK 2011	United Kingdom	
2010	MIR 14	G-Man	Mr. Southeast Rubber 2010	United States	
2009	MIR 13	Fenn	Mr. Rubber Toronto 2010	Canada	
2008	MIR 12	Stephane Donaldson	Mr. Rubber Montreal 2008	Canada	
2007	MIR 11	BJ Turgeon	Mr. Rubber Montreal 2007	Canada	
2006	MIR 10	Maurizo Iacone	Mr. Rubber Italy 2006	Italy	
2005	MIR 9	Michael Schneider	Mr. Rubclub 2005	Germany	
2004	MIR 8	Frank Bug	Mr. Rubclub 2004	Germany	
2003	MIR 7	Chris Vincent		United States	
2002	MIR 6	William "Rubberwilli" Schendel		United States	
2001	MIR 5	Yannick Kerjose		France	
2000	MIR 4	Chad McLaughlin		United States	
1999	MIR 3	Tom Kelley		United States	
1998	MIR 2	Thomas Smith		United States	
1997	MIR 1	Christoph Lehner		United States	

== See also ==
- Mister Rubber Europe
- International Mr. Leather
- International Ms. Leather
- Leather competitions
- Rubber events and organizations
