= Rubber and PVC fetishism =

Type of fetish towards latex clothing

The rubber pride flag, a symbol of the rubber and latex community, created by Scott Moats and Peter Tolos in 1995.

Rubber fetishism, or latex fetishism, is the fetishistic attraction to people wearing latex clothing or other natural or synthetic rubber garments, or, in some cases, to the garments themselves. PVC fetishism refers to clothing made of the synthetic plastic PVC and is closely related to rubber fetishism due to the similarly shiny appearances of these materials. Latex or rubber fetishists may refer to themselves as "rubberists". Male rubberists tend to call themselves "rubbermen".

== History ==
Rubber has long been regarded as a sensuous material because of its unique look, smell and feel. The practical wear of rubber or rubber-bonded materials dates back to the 19th century. In 1824, Charles Macintosh created a design for rubber-coated fabric that was used in the famous Mackintosh coat. Although it was invented for practical purposes as a waterproof layering garment, the Mackintosh coat attracted a fetishistic following, documented in letters about rubber and latex play sent to early fetish magazines. Following the invention of vulcanization to harden rubber on an industrial scale, rubber clothing became available in more styles and was known as a fad by the 1850s. Rubber finally fell out of fashion for public wear in the 1890s.

The 20th century featured a progression of fetishistic interest from "soft" materials like silk and fur towards "hard"-looking materials like leather and plastic. Throughout the 1920s and 1930s, London Life published letters and photos from readers describing their own rubber fetishism. However, increased social conservatism following World War II pushed fetishists underground until the 1950s, when British designer John Sutcliffe's development of weather resistant clothing for bikers resulted in the creation of the first rubber catsuit, credited for the reemergence of rubber and latex fashion.

The 1960s and 1970s saw rubber fetishism enter wider public perception, with the creation of dedicated magazines like Sutcliffe's AtomAge and the popularity of British TV series The Avengers, which featured Diana Rigg wearing rubber and leather clothing inspired by Sutcliffe's 'couture' fetishwear designs. Punk fashion designers Vivienne Westwood and Malcom McLaren began to incorporate latex into their designs in this era, and were interviewed alongside Sutcliffe and other rubber fetishists by British filmmaker John Samson in the 1977 documentary Dressing for Pleasure. This film was made in part at Westwood and McLaren's London boutique, which was the only store selling latex fetishwear in the open at the time.

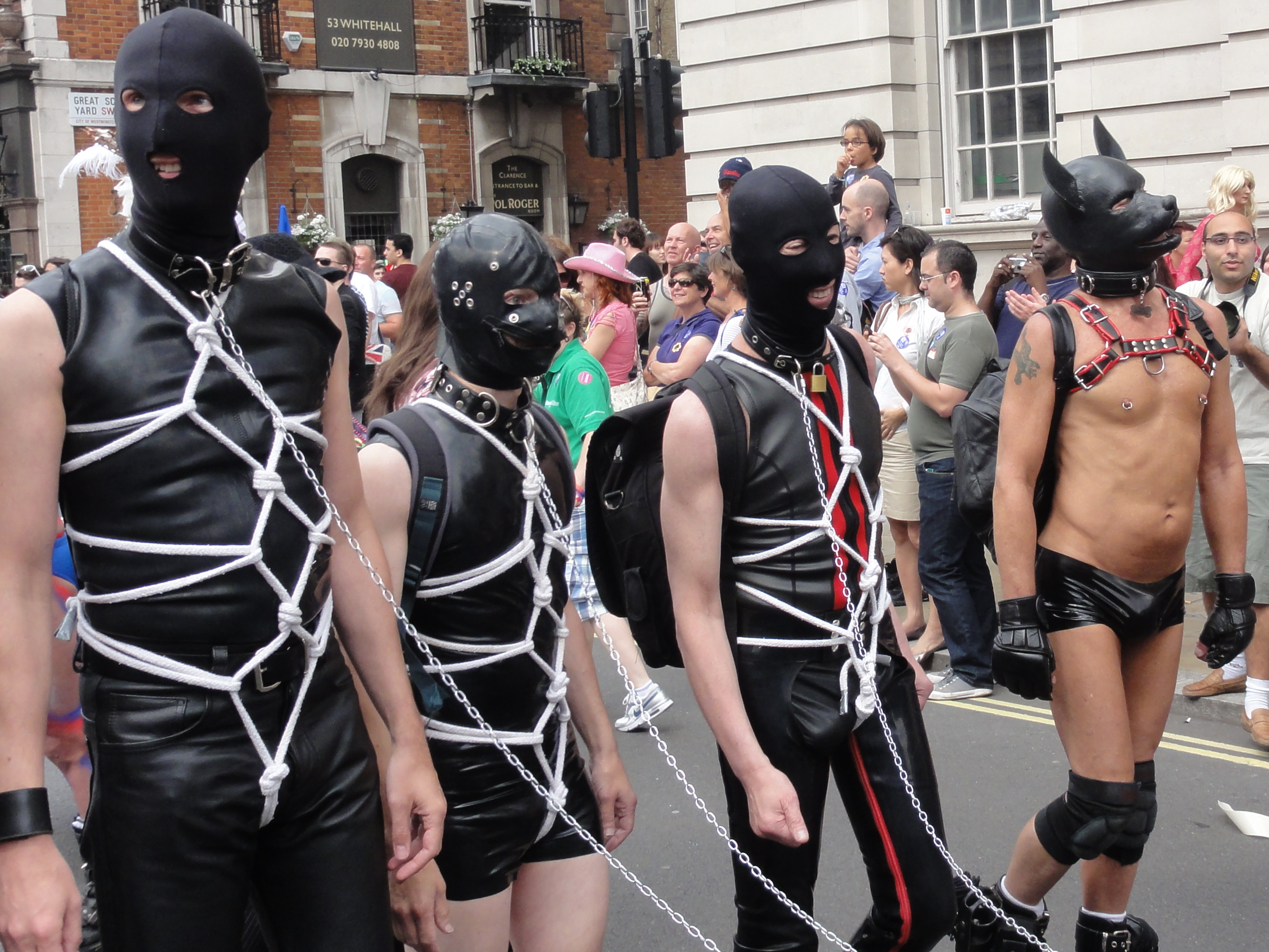
Men in latex gear marching down Whitehall as part of Pride London 2011.

In the 1980s, Skin Two magazine documented the emergence of the fetish club scene, including extensive coverage of rubber clothing, and played a crucial role in its introduction into high fashion by featuring gender inclusive and style-oriented photography of rubber fetishwear. Numerous underground fetish production houses were started throughout the 1980s and 1990s, publishing magazines such as Shiny, Shiny International, Marquis, «O», Rubberist, and Dressing for Pleasure (which later merged with Rubberist), and expanding the reach of rubber fetish authors like Robert and Helen Henley. American magazine Rubber Rebel, which ran from 1993 to 1996, has been credited with helping to define latex culture for gay men.

As rubberists sought community, the 1990s also saw the first appearance of rubber fetish weekends modeled on leather events and contests that had developed in the 1970s. In 1995, Scott Moats and Peter Tolos created the rubber pride flag for people with rubber and latex fetishes. Moats and Tolos explained the colors as follows: black represents "our lust for the look and feel for shiny black rubber," red "our blood passion for rubber and rubbermen," and yellow "our drive for intense rubber play and fantasies."

== Prevalence ==
Rubber fetishism is not uncommon. In a 1983 review of 48 cases of clinical fetishism (all male), 22.9% of subjects were reported to have a fetish for rubber or rubber items. A 2017 study found rubber fetishism to have a roughly 12% prevalence in a sample of Belgian adults, with men expressing interest more commonly than women. In 2021, gay and bisexual men's magazine FS reported that 23% of respondents to a reader survey stated that rubber was one of their top fetishes.

While the majority of rubber fetishists are heterosexual men, rubber is also popular among gay men and often found alongside leather in LGBTQ+ spaces. Since the 2010s, increased interest in rubber among gender minority populations has spurred efforts to improve gender inclusion and access in associated organizations.

== Practices ==
Latex fetishism can involve dressing up in the material or looking at it while worn by sexual partners. Many fetishists report attraction to the glossy look, distinctive sounds, or smell produced by latex garments.

Motivations for wear can include both physical sensory experiences, especially from skin-tight garments, and emotional experiences like dehumanization or objectification. The physical experience of wearing latex has been described as that of a "second skin". Related sensory experiences like total enclosure and sensory deprivation may also be achieved using rubber or latex.

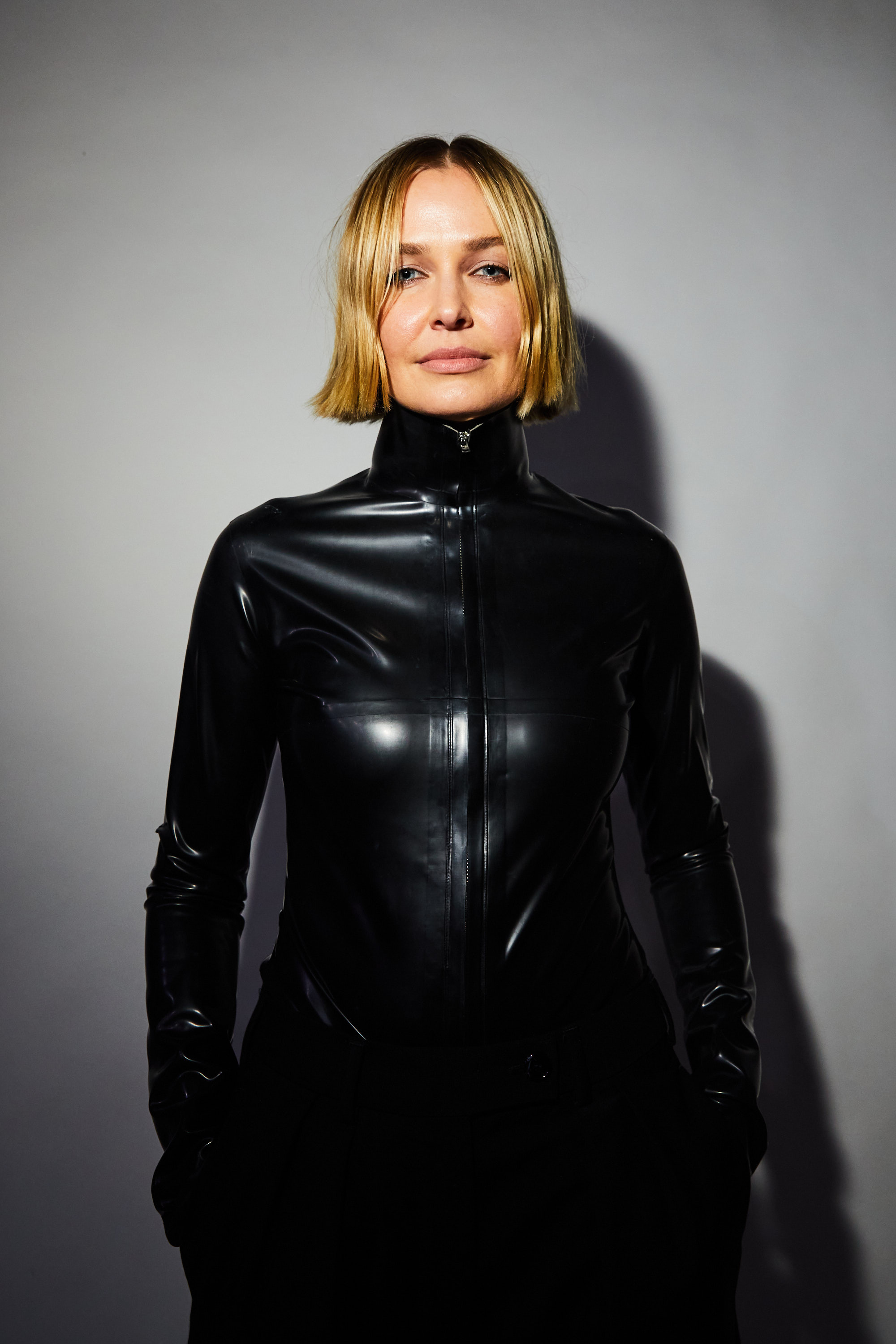
Lara Worthington wearing a latex catsuit in 2021

Ordinary garments of interest to rubber and latex enthusiasts may include wetsuits, mackintoshes, diving suits, gas masks, splash or hazmat suits, galoshes, Wellington boots, rubber/plastic pants, and diapers, as well as draped rubber items like cloaks. Rubber fetishists may also create and wear rubber counterparts of ordinary fabric clothing.

Specialist latex or rubber fetish clothing is produced in a wide range of styles and sizes, including custom and premade items, and available through both online and brick-and-mortar stores. Several mainstream designers have also made latex clothing inspired by, but not necessarily intended as, fetishwear. The catsuit is a common example of latex apparel, and is used in both fetish practices and non-fetish imagery.

=== Events and organizations ===
BDSM and fetish events like the Folsom Street Fair, Wasteland, and the German Fetish Ball welcome fetishists with a variety of interests, including rubber and latex. Rubberists can also be found at major fetish venues such as Torture Garden and KitKatClub.

The rubber scene has paralleled the leather scene in the development of dedicated organizations and clubs for likeminded fetishists seeking community. Rubber fetish event weekends such as Manchester Rubber Weekend and MIR have been held since the 1990s. Much like leather title competitions, rubber clubs often hold competitions for local and regional titles, whose winners may go on to compete at larger rubber-focused conventions. MIR has hosted a Rubber Club Summit since at least 2010 to connect rubberists interested in taking leadership roles in their local fetish communities. A European title, Mister Rubber Europe, was created in 2024.

== Latex look-alike materials ==
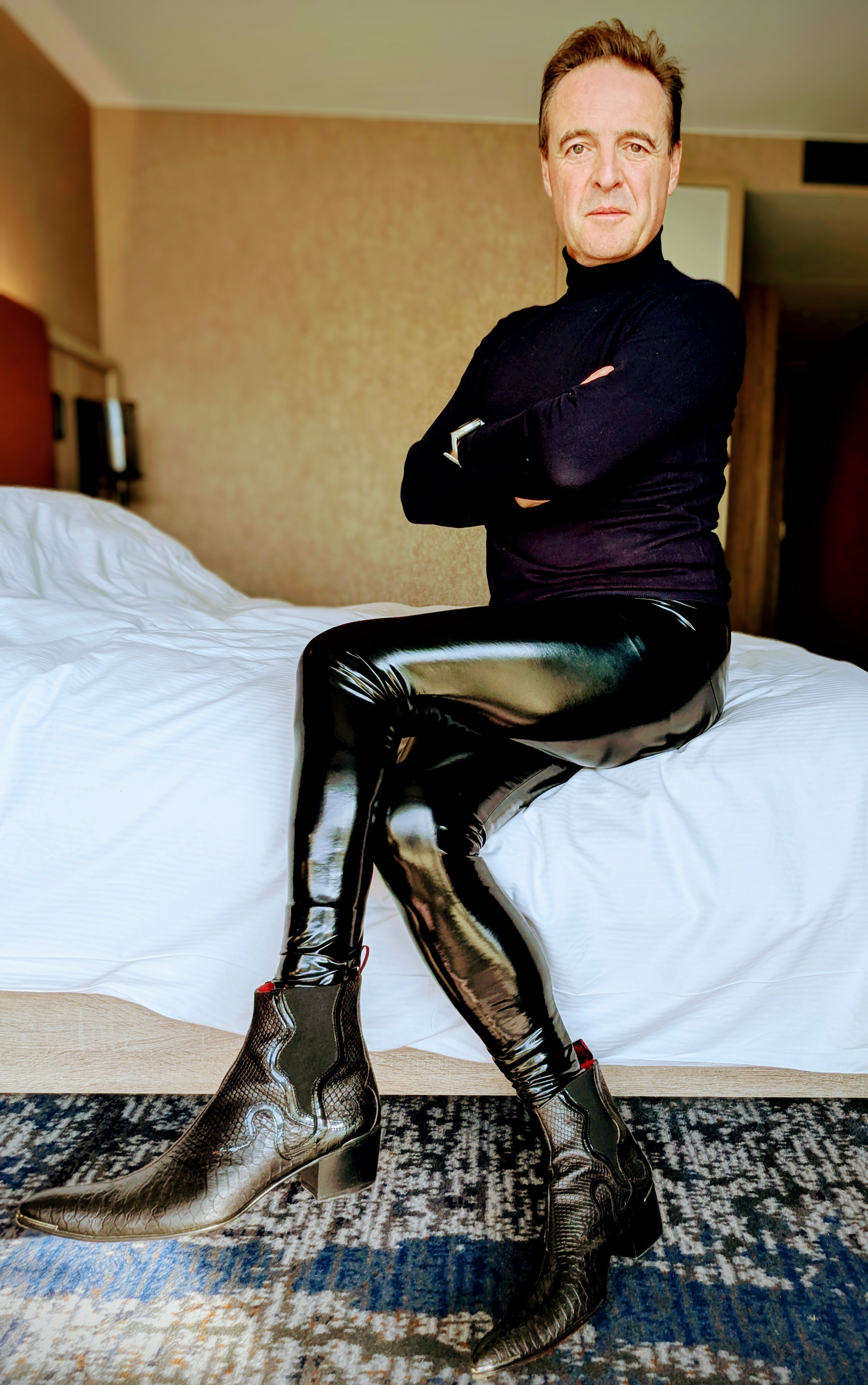
British historian Guy Walters wearing black PVC leggings

Due to its shiny quality, latex is sometimes associated with other materials such as PVC (polyvinyl chloride or "vinyl"), pleather (polyurethane or PU), or patent leather. When smooth in texture and reflective, these materials may also be described as "wetlook".

Like other clothing fetishes, PVC and plastic fetishism may involve wearing the material or seeing it worn by others. As with latex, awareness of PVC as a fetish material increased in the 1960s and early 1970s, a rise credited in large part to boots and other garments worn on The Avengers.

== In popular culture ==
- The artwork of Allen Jones has been strongly influenced by the imagery of rubber fetishism and BDSM.
- Footage from rubber fetish documentary film Dressing for Pleasure (1977) was used in the 2000 film The Filth and the Fury documenting the history of the Sex Pistols and played on a continuous loop during Vivienne Westwood's 2004 career retrospective.
- In Secret Diary of a Call Girl (2007), a British drama television series, Gemma Chan wore a variety of latex costumes for her role as the dominatrix Charlotte.
- The series American Horror Story depicts an antagonist known as "Rubber Man", a character in a latex bondage suit.
- The 2010 Japanese film Rubbers stars actress Aino Kishi as an ordinary woman with a rubber fetish.
- The BDSM romance film Pillion (2025) features the work of costume designer Grace Snell, who sought to accurately depict fetish fashions, including natural-colored latex.

== See also ==
- BDSM
- Fetish fashion
- Kink (sexuality)
- Latex clothing
- Leather subculture
- Neoprene
- PVC clothing
- Spandex fetishism
