= Skin-tight garment =

Clothing that hugs the body

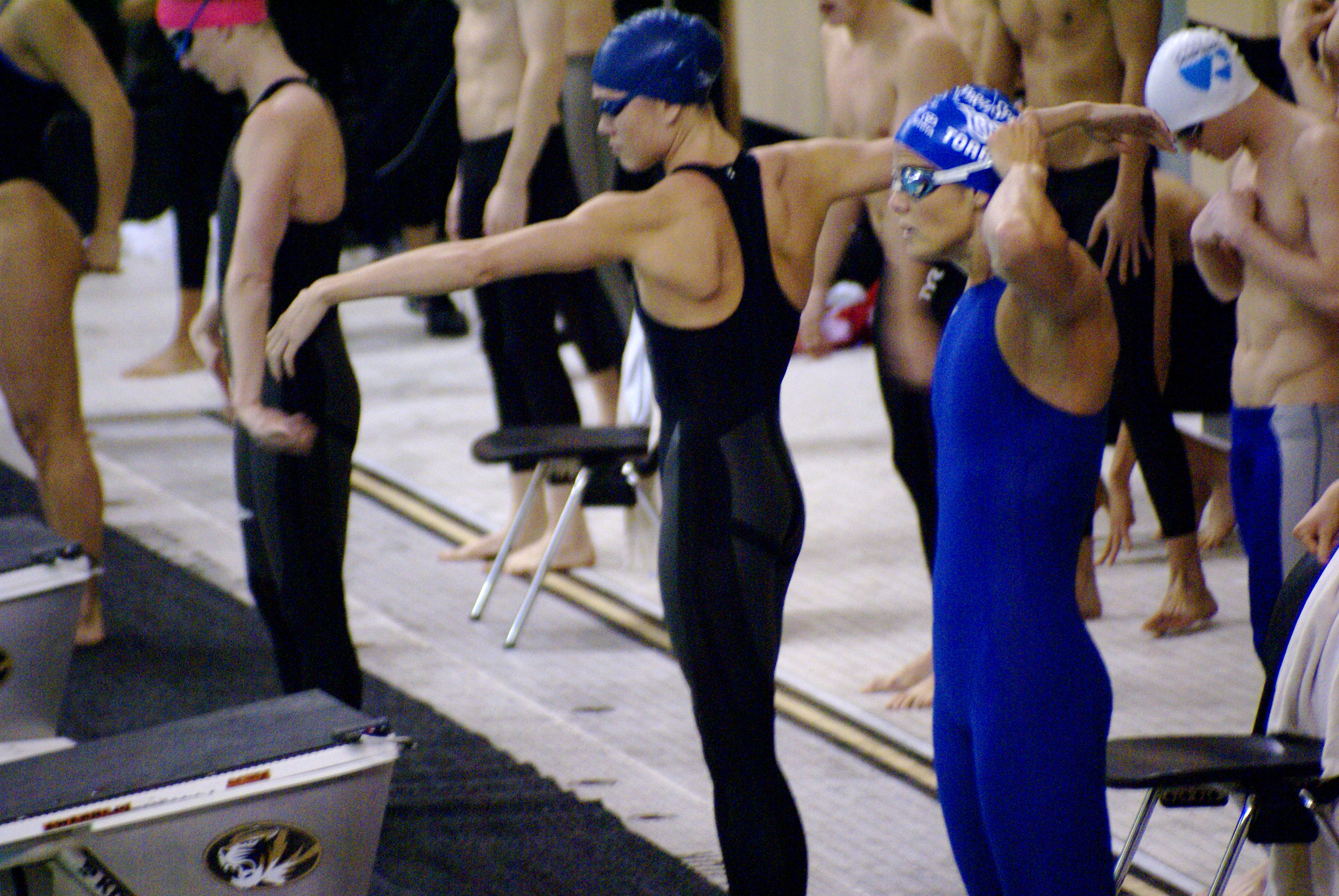
Various swimmers' garments

A skin-tight garment is a garment that is held to the skin usually by elastic tension using some type of stretch fabric. Commercial stretch fabrics ('elastomerics') such as spandex or elastane (widely branded as 'Lycra') came onto the market in 1962, and revolutionized many areas of the clothing industry. A wide variety of clothing may be made to be skin-tight, and it is common for clothing to be skin-tight for some uses, such as in stockings, bodystockings, swimsuits and bras.

== History and types ==
=== Leotard ===
In 1886, the name leotard was given to a one-piece skin-tight garment that covers the torso including the crotch, but not the legs or arms. The garment was named after French acrobatic performer Jules Léotard (1838–1870), many years after his death, who wore the garment in his acrobatic act. In the early 20th century, use of leotards was mainly confined to circus and acrobatic shows, but were also worn by professional dancers, such as the showgirls of Broadway. Leotards on the stage were typically worn with stockings or tights.

In the 1950s, traditionally-styled leotards continued to be worn mainly by stage performers and circus actors, but leotards began to be used as simple and functional exercise garments, often in institutional settings like schools and in fitness training. These were almost always black and worn together with thick tights. Between 1950 and 1970, leotards remained as such in appearance until a style change in the 1970s, when more colorful leotards appeared on the scene, most often in ballet and exercise.

=== Swimwear ===
The 1920s and 1930s saw leotards influencing swimsuit styles, with women's one-piece swimsuits today still being similar in appearance to leotards. The most common type of one-piece swimsuit is the maillot or tank suit, which resembles a sleeveless leotard or bodysuit. In early years the one-piece swimsuit would have a narrow skirt slip or micro-shorts, for modesty considerations, but these were beginning to disappear in the 1940s. A recent innovation in one-piece swimsuits is the bodyskin, which superficially resembles a unitard or wetsuit. Although these cover the entire torso, arms and legs, their function is not modesty, but reducing friction through the water for professional swimmers.

=== Bodystocking ===
A bodystocking is a one-piece skin-tight garment that covers the torso, legs and sometimes the arms of the wearer. It is a foundation garment or an article of lingerie usually made from a sheer fabric similar to that used for stockings or pantyhose, or from fishnet, lace or an opaque material, or a variation of these materials. A bodystocking differs from a unitard, which is worn as an outfit or article of clothing, and a leotard, which is used as a practice garment or performance costume by acrobats, gymnasts and other similar performers. Designed to be revealed, but not to be too revealing, bodystockings may be worn as undergarments by performers such as belly dancers and exotic dancers.

Bodystockings were used on stage in at least 1860s. In 1861, American actress Adah Isaacs Menken controversially wore a flesh coloured bodystocking on stage, to preserve her modesty and stay within the obscenity laws, while giving the illusion of nudity.

=== Unitard ===
A unitard is a type of garment that combines the features of a leotard with those of tights, covering the legs and sometimes extending to the arms. It is essentially a one-piece outfit that is both a leotard and a legging, often resembling a bodystocking but designed to be worn as outerwear for everyday use.

=== Bodysuit ===
A bodysuit covers the torso, crotch, and sometimes the legs, hands, and feet. The style of a basic bodysuit is similar to a one-piece swimsuit and a leotard, though the materials may vary, and a bodysuit, unlike a swimsuit or leotard, has snaps, hooks or velcro at the crotch. A bodysuit may have sleeves and varying shoulder strap and collar styles. Bodysuits can be made from a number of fabrics, including cotton, lace, nylon, etc. In general, textile bodysuits include expandable fiber such as spandex for a better fit to the shape of the body.

A bodysuit is normally worn with trousers or a skirt, exposing at most the top of the garment above the waist. The top, torso part may act as a top for the smooth line it gives or because it cannot become untucked from trousers or skirt. They may also be worn generally by women as underwear, activewear, or foundation garments. Unlike a leotard, a bodysuit is not usually considered a form of athletic wear. The purpose of the opening at the crotch is to facilitate access during a visit to the toilet.

=== Stocking and pantyhose ===
Modern stockings became popular in the 1920s with the rise in women's hemlines. They were sheer, first made of silk or rayon (then known as "artificial silk"), and after 1940 of nylon. Nylon stockings were cheap, durable, and sheer compared to their cotton and silk counterparts. These stocking were very popular, and the demand for them has continued, though it has given ground to tights or pantyhose. During the 1960s, improved textile manufacturing processes made pantyhose cheaper, while spandex (or elastane) made them more comfortable and durable, and the miniskirt made the pantyhose a necessity to many women. The popularity of pantyhose grew into a wardrobe staple throughout the 1970s and 1980s. From 1995 there was a steady decline in sales of pantyhose, levelling off in 2006 with American sales less than half of what they had once been.

=== Sportswear ===
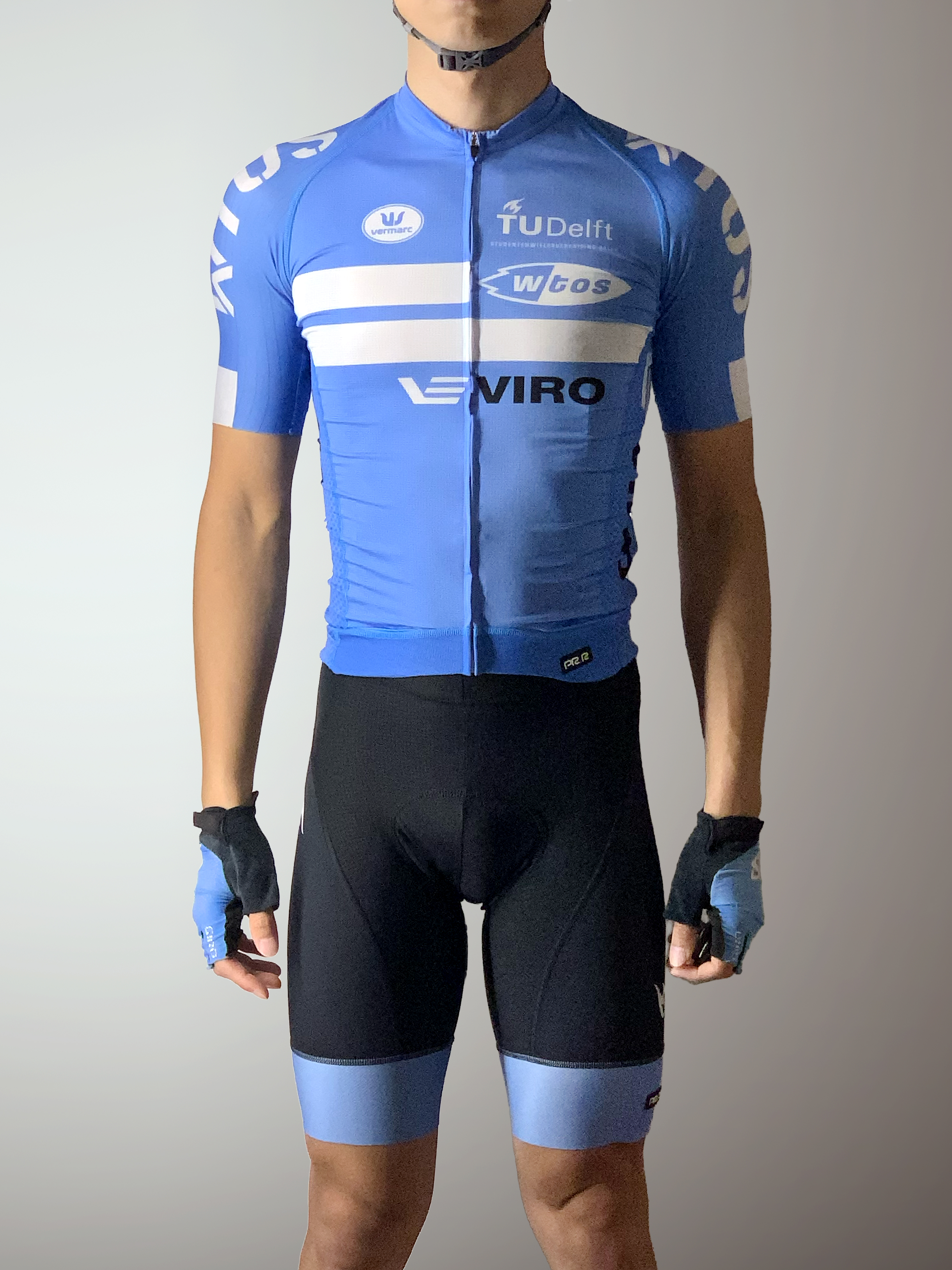
Elastic material used in the fabrics of a summer cycling attire comprising a jersey, bib shorts and gloves.

The development and use of stretch fabrics simplified the construction of clothing. First used in swimsuits and women's bras, fashion designers began using them as early as the mid-1980s. They entered the mainstream market in the early 1990s, and are now widely used in sports clothing.

In various athletic and performance contexts, skin-tight garments, also known as skin suits, offer a range of benefits, including injury protection and prevention of scrapes, while also providing enhanced muscle support and reduced muscle vibration. These garments also help to minimize wind and friction drag, making them ideal for activities such as swimming, cycling, skating, skiing, and running. Moreover, they offer protection from cuts, stings, and abrasions, as well as safeguarding against the harmful effects of UV radiation from the sun. This type of clothing is a key component of many athletic ensembles, providing a comprehensive solution for athletes seeking to optimize their performance and safety.

== Other uses ==
It is possible that military personnel have incorporated skintight clothing into their uniforms, as suggested by a North Korean soldier who was spotted wearing a skintight blue suit during a military exhibition. However, the purpose of this attire remains unclear.

Skin-tight garments also intersect with the realm of fetishism; certain types of fetishized clothing, such as latex and spandex suits, are designed to be extremely skintight. For individuals with a rubber or spandex fetish, these garments hold a strong sexual appeal, which may be attributed to the sensation they create on the skin, making it feel more sensitive, while also providing a sense of being naked yet clothed.

In a more practical application, skin-tight spacesuits serve a crucial purpose for astronauts by helping to maintain the shape of their spines. The equal pressure exerted by the suit on the skin's surface provides support to the muscles, which is essential for astronauts who spend extended periods in space.

== See also ==
- Breeches
- Briefs
- Bodyskin
- Bodysuit
- Catsuit
- Compression garment
- Diveskin
- Form-fitting garment
- Leotard
- One-piece swimsuit
- Gimp suit
- Jammers
- Jeans
- Latex clothing, including liquid latex
- Leggings
- Polo neck
- Space activity suit
- Spandex
- Sportswear
- Unitard
- Wetsuit
- Zentai
