= Form-fitting garment =

Clothing that tightly fits the body

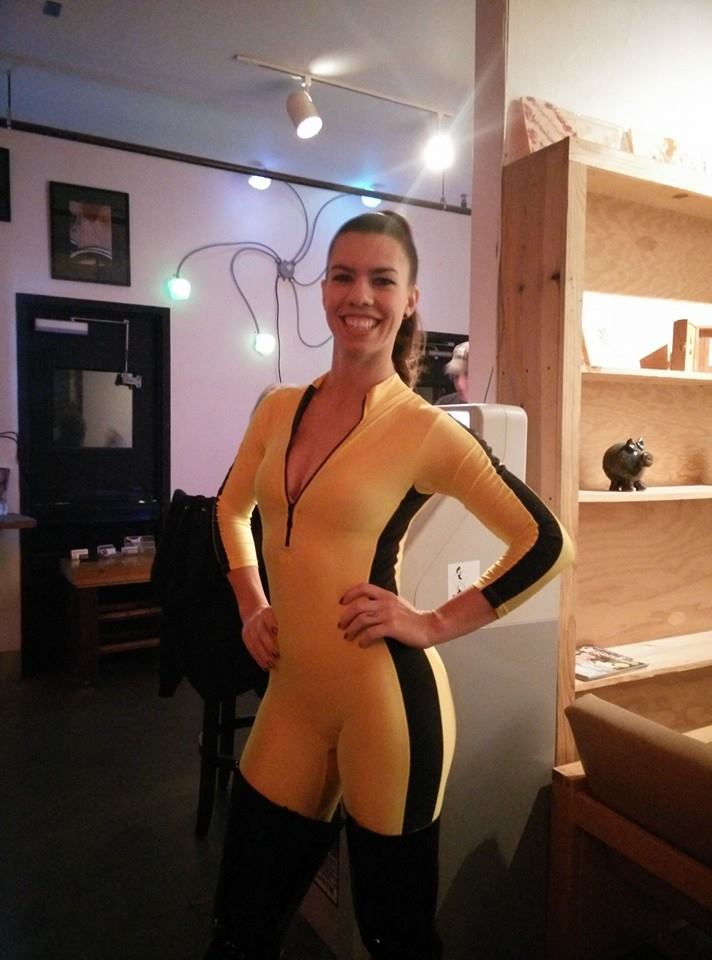
A form-fitting Halloween costume

A form-fitting garment is an article of clothing that tightly follows the contours of the part of the body being covered. A feature of modern western societies is the popularity of form-fitting clothing worn by women, compared to equivalent male garments. These include T-shirts, sweaters, shorts, and jeans. Some cultures and religious communities disapprove of form-fitting clothing, especially outerwear, which they consider to be immodest.

There are numerous types of clothing which typically are or which can be made form-fitting. For example, stockings, leggings, tights, and socks are usually form-fitting. Clothing used in dance and in exercise, such as leotards, unitard, and swimsuits, are usually form-fitting. Undergarments or foundation garments such as corsets, girdles, bodysuits, brassieres, and underpants are form-fitting to give a smooth line to the outer clothing.

Skin-tight garments are usually also form-fitting, but are held to the skin by elastic tension. In contrast, non-form-fitting garments are commonly referred to as "loose".

Though many materials can be used to make form-fitting garments, the thinner materials, such as synthetic fibers, are the most commonly used, because of the smooth line that can be produced as well as their extra strength when pulled tight. Some fabrics cling to the skin or do so when wet, giving a form-fitting effect.

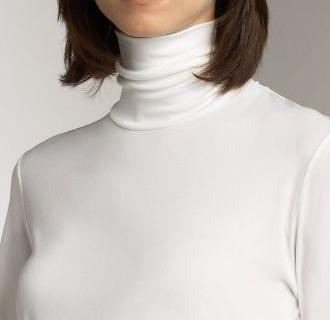
A turtleneck

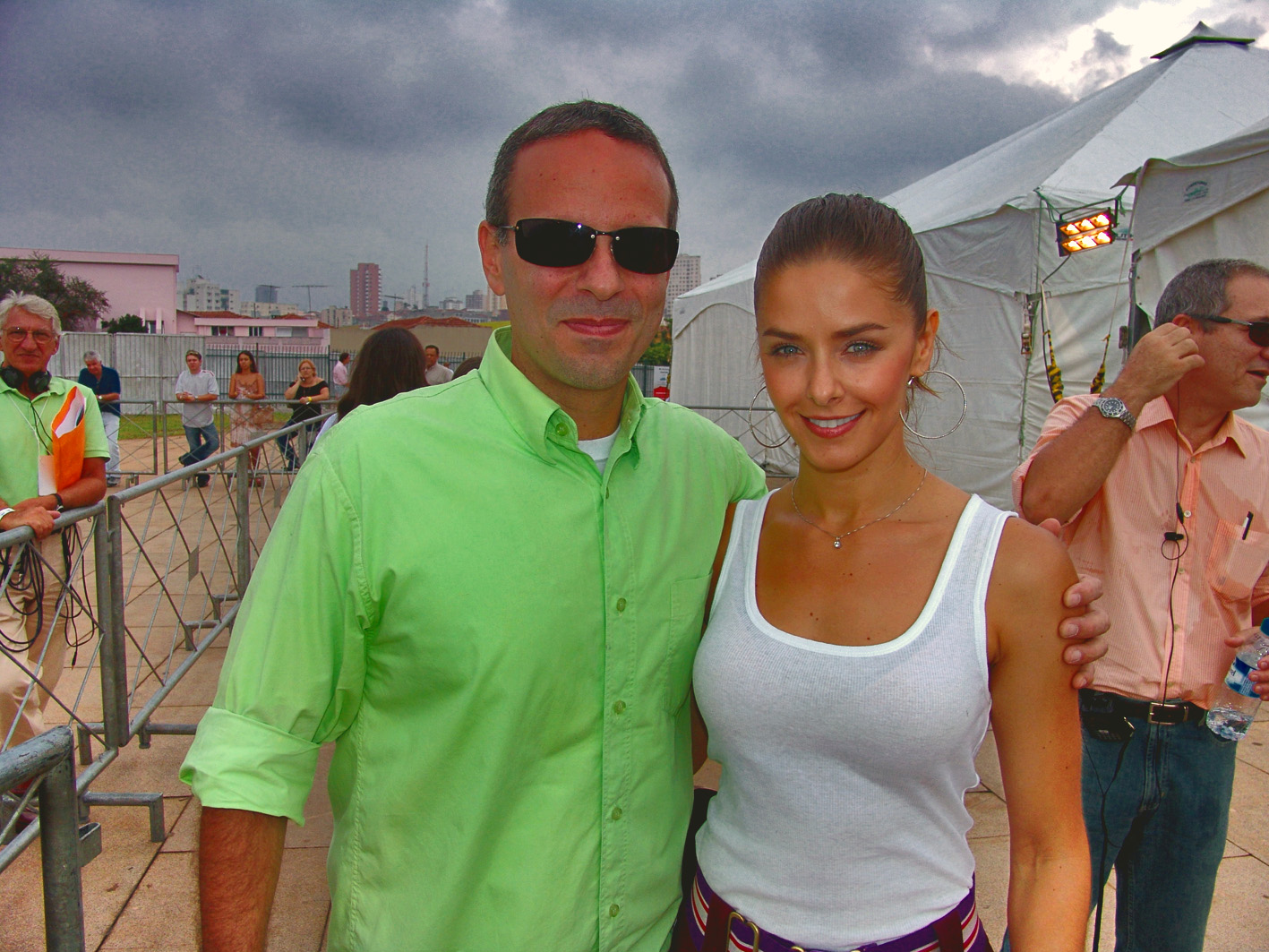
Bianca Rinaldi with a t-shirt

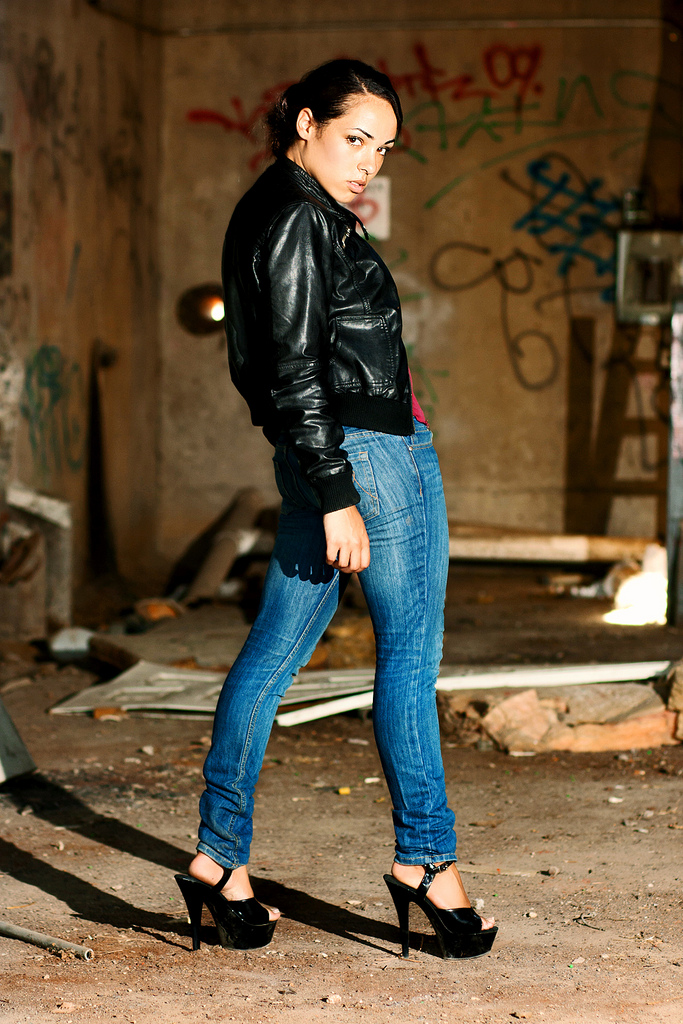
Tight jeans

== See also ==
- Bodystocking
- Bodysuit
- Catsuit
- Compression garment
- Infant bodysuit
- Romper suit
- Tank suit
- Spandex
