= Bodysuit =

One-piece form-fitting garment that covers the torso and the crotch

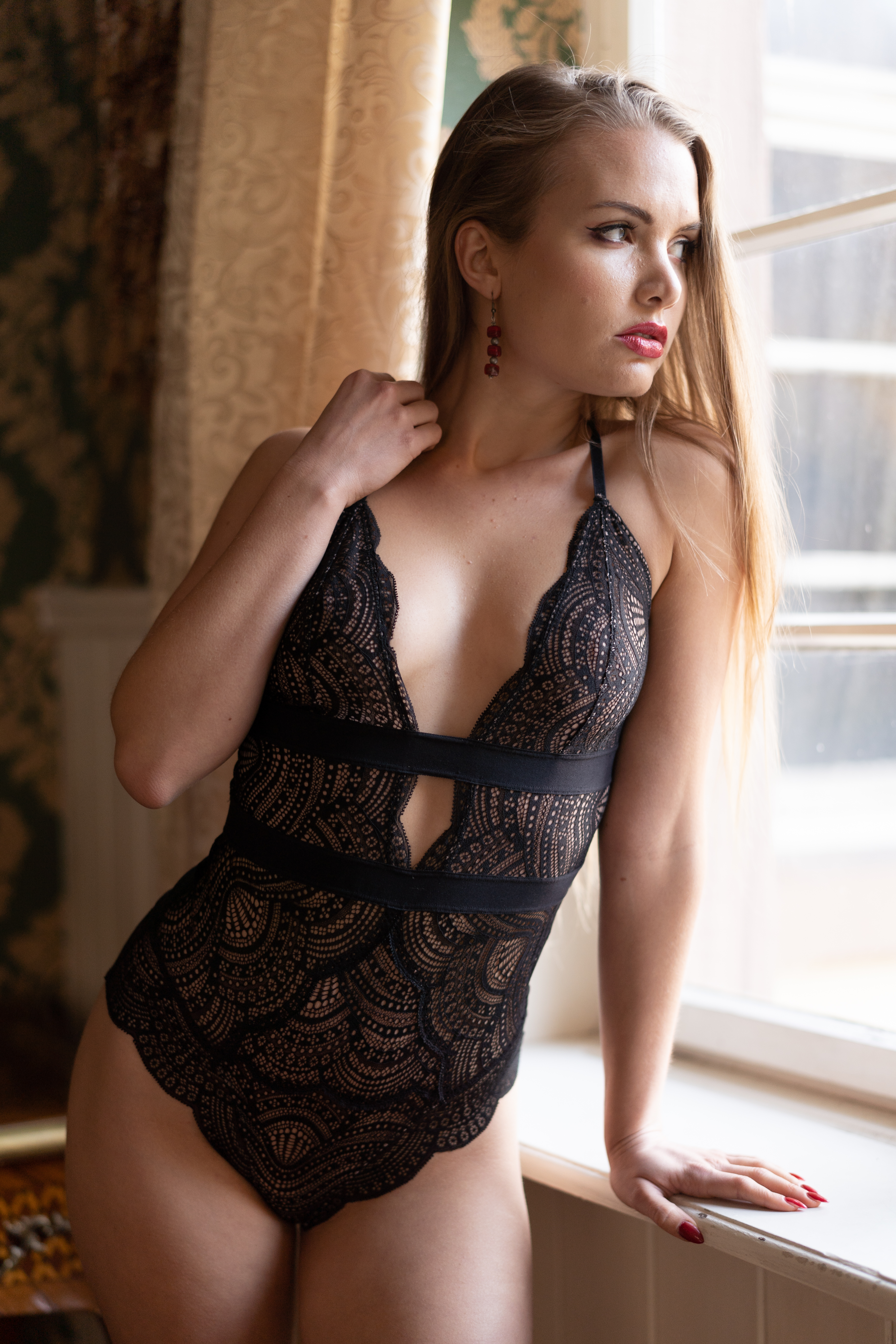
Lace bodysuit that has a skin-coloured lining in the breast and genital area. It may be worn as a top or lingerie.

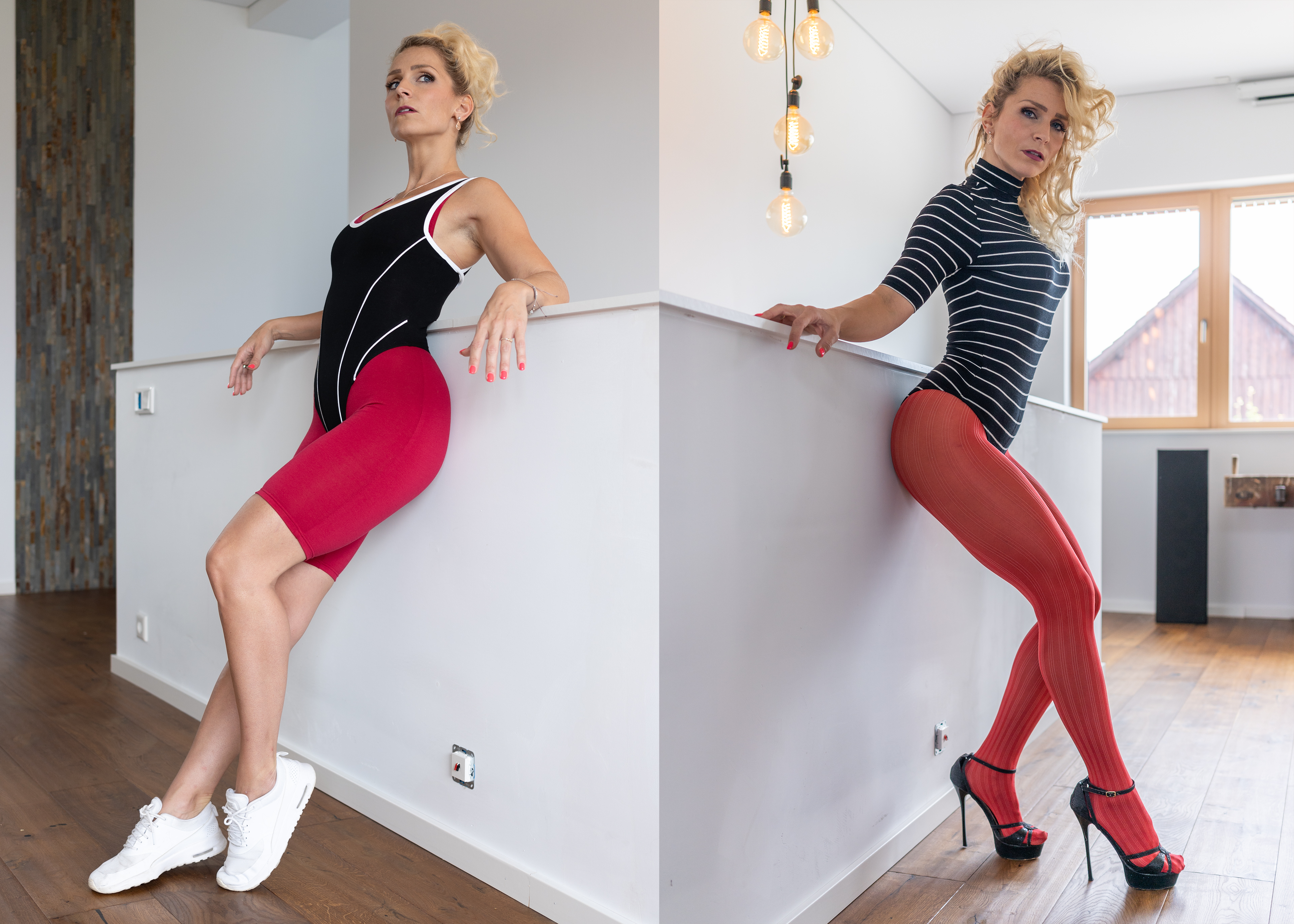
Three of these clothing items may be called body or even bodysuit in some languages, while in English, only the right black piece is considered a bodysuit. The left black is a thong leotard and the red under it a unitard.

A bodysuit is a one-piece form-fitting or skin-tight garment that covers the torso and the crotch. The design of a basic bodysuit is similar to a one-piece swimsuit and a leotard, though the materials may vary. Thong or T-front thong bodysuits usually have the crotch opening moved up to the front to underbelly area to increase the wearer's comfort. A bodysuit may have sleeves and varying shoulder strap and collar. Bodysuits can be made from a number of fabrics, including cotton, lace, nylon, etc. In general, textile bodysuits include expandable fiber such as spandex for a better fit to the shape of the body.

A bodysuit is normally worn with trousers or a skirt. The top, torso part may act as a top for the smooth line it gives or because it cannot become untucked from trousers or skirt. They may also be worn generally by women as underwear, activewear, or foundation garments. Unlike a leotard, a bodysuit is not usually considered a form of athletic wear.

Onesies (or snapsuits) are bodysuits with a buttoned-down opening at the crotch that help keep diapers in place. The opening helps facilitate access to a person's diaper or visits to the toilet. These are almost exclusively worn by infants, but adult-sized versions have also become popular among certain kink subcultures.

There are also bodyshirts, like the counterpart to the bodysuit, they are loose-fitting garments that cover the whole torso, with sleeves in short to long lengths and crotch snaps. The difference is that they look like a shirt on the top portion of the garment, and may have a different stretch fabric in the waist to the crotch area to make them fit better. Long sleeved crew neck and turtleneck bodysuits are a common element of dancewear costumes.

== History ==
The bodysuit was a progression from the leotard. It was presented in the United States after 1950 by fashion designer Claire McCardell. It was worn as a blouse or T-shirt. The first recognized bodysuit was worn by Bettie Page in the 1950s, and was a trademark attire of the Playboy Bunnies from the 1960s, as well as Wonder Woman in the animated series Super Friends and Lynda Carter's television series.

Azzedine Alaia and Donna Karan helped make the bodysuit a fashion item for both men, women and even tweens, teens, and young adult/college age in the 1980s to mid 1990s seen a lot in short cap sleeved or turtleneck versions worn in popular fashion as a top especially with high waisted jeans and also with regular and dress shorts and skirts. After a slowdown, it was resurrected as shaping underwear or lingerie, and in the 2010s it reappeared as a blouse bodysuit, cap sleeve, and classic turtleneck bodysuit, as well as a part of evening wear.

== See also ==
- Bodystocking
- Catsuit
- Girdle
- Infant bodysuit
- Romper suit
- Tank suit
- Teddy (garment)
- Unitard
- Zentai
