= Sasaki Sports =

Japanese gymnastics equipment manufacturer

Sasaki Sports, Inc
- Native name: 株式会社ササキスポーツ
- Industry: Sporting goods
- Founded: March 1957; 69 years ago
- Headquarters: 3-15-3 Ikejiri, Setagaya-ku, Tokyo, Japan
- Products: Artistic and rhythmic gymnastics clothing, rhythmic gymnastics apparatuses
- Number of employees: 92

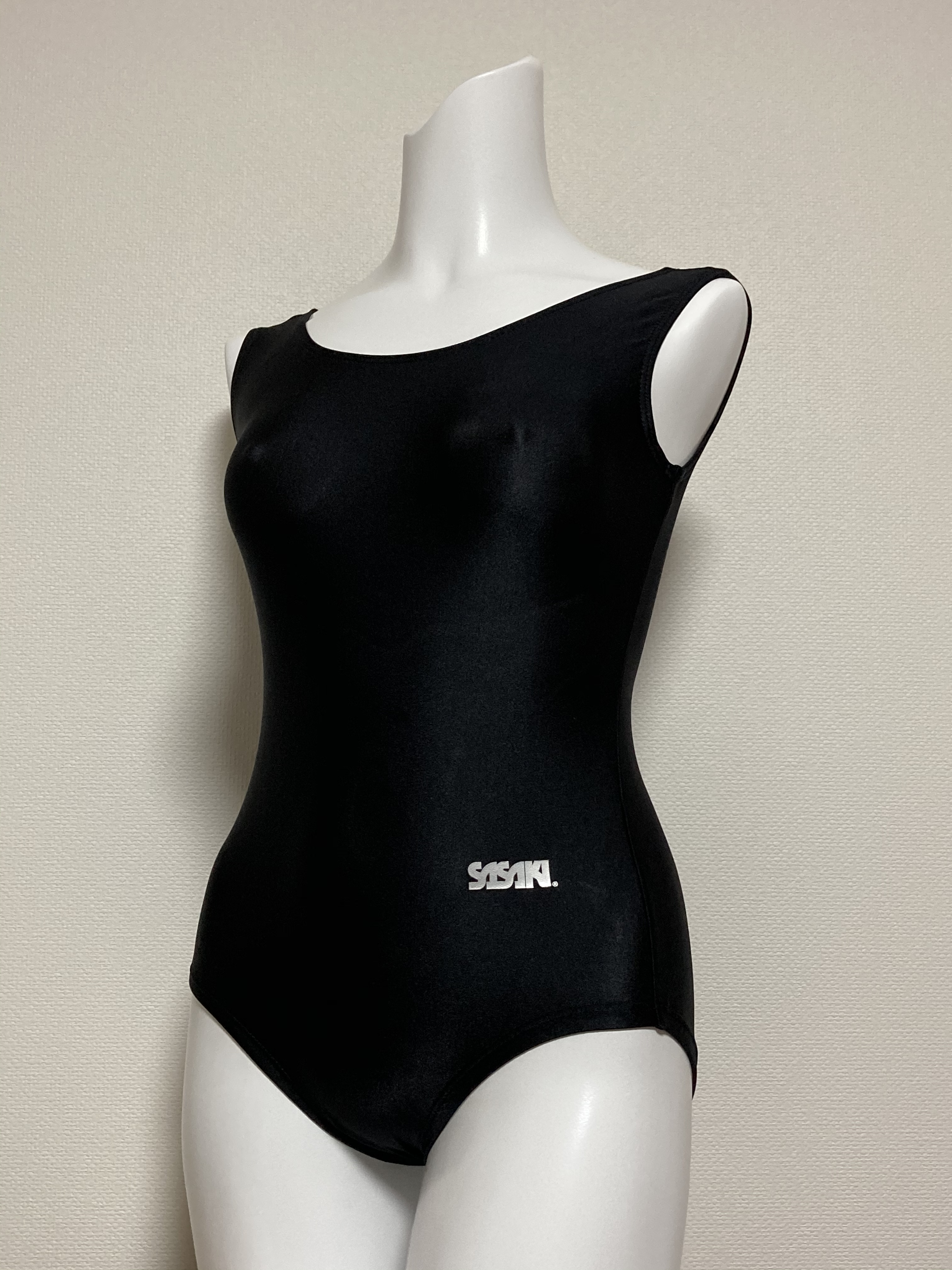
Sasaki leotard

Sasaki Sports, Inc (Japanese: 株式会社ササキスポーツ (Kabushiki-gaisha Sasaki Spōtsu)) is a company based in Shibuya, Tokyo. It manufactures and sells clothing for artistic and rhythmic gymnastics as well as rhythmic gymnastics apparatuses and school gym uniforms.

== Overview ==
Sasaki Sports was founded in March 1957 as a store at Nippon Sport Science University. It was incorporated in February 1962 and moved to its current location in Ikejiri, Shibuya in June 1995.

The company manufactures and sells gymnastics wear and apparatuses. It has supplied Olympic athletes starting from the 1960 Summer Olympics, where it provided competition wear for the Japanese artistic gymnastics team. At the time, Japanese women gymnasts wore separate tops and bottoms, while overseas gymnasts already wore leotards. Sasaki Sports researched how to manufacture leotards on request from the Nippon Sports Science University and supplied the women's team with them; it was the first time Japanese women's gymnasts competed in leotards.

In 1969, the company began to offer leotards for rhythmic gymnasts. It was the official Olympic supplier of the Bulgarian national rhythmic gymnastics team from 40 years from 1985 to 2025, when the Bulgarian Rhythmic Gymnastics Federation changed its official supplier to the Italian company Venturelli, citing increased competition in developing high-quality equipment and the much closer location of Italy making it easier to order from. It also supplies the Japanese national team. Custom leotards are dyed and decorated with rhinestones by hand, and orders generally take 3 to 5 months to complete.
