= Spandex fetishism =

Erotic attraction to stretchable clothing

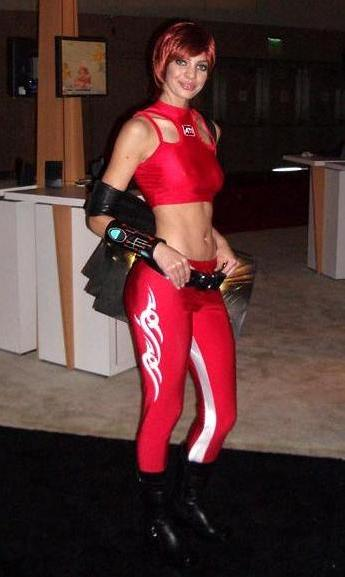
Booth babe wearing a spandex costume at the Electronic Entertainment Expo.

Spandex fetishism is a fetishistic attraction to people wearing form-fitting stretch fabrics or to the wearing of items of clothing made of such material. Spandex garments are often worn by swimmers, gymnasts, ballet dancers, wrestlers, rowers, cyclists, contortionists and circus performers, and spandex fetishists may incorporate fantasies about these activities into their particular fetish.

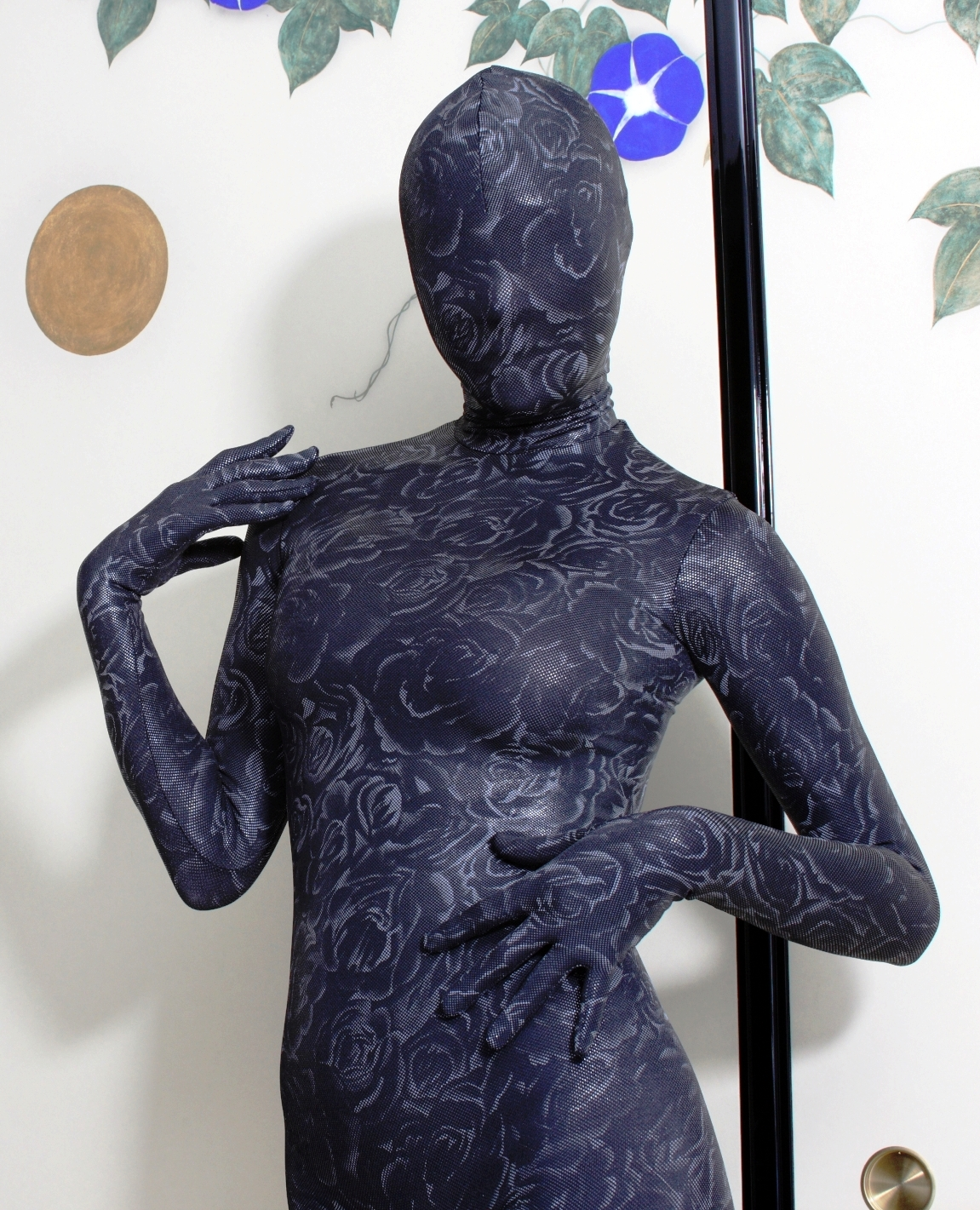
Spandex Zentai suit

One reason spandex and other tight fabrics may be fetishized is that the garment forms a "second skin", acting as a surrogate for the wearer's own skin. Wearers of skin-tight nylon and cotton spandex garments can appear naked or coated in a shiny or matte substance like paint. The tightness of the garments may also be seen as sexual bondage. Another reason, at least pertinent to nylon-spandex fabric, is that the material can have a very smooth and silk-like finish, which lends a tactile dimension to the fetish - as well as a visual one. The pressure of tight garments against the genitals can become quite sensual.

In a 2023 op-ed for the New York Times, Preston Gyuwon So, in explaining the fetish wrote, "Many “rubberists,” as we call ourselves, prefer the all-encompassing stimulus of full-body compression, sometimes with attached hoods and gloves, trading porous, pockmarked skin for skin that’s pristine and pretend."

Pantyhose fetishism can be viewed as a class of spandex fetishism.

== See also ==
- Catsuit
- Cosplay
- Dance belt
- Darlexx
- Leggings
- Leotard
- Polo neck
- Rubber and PVC fetishism
- Skin-tight garment
- Stockings
- Superhero erotica
- Swimsuit
- Zentai
