= The Green Men =

Vancouver Canucks fans

Sully and Force
- First appearance: versus Nashville Predators, December 22, 2009

In-universe information
- Aliases: The Green Men, Vancouver Green Men

The Green Men, known as Force (Adam Forsyth) and Sully (Ryan Sullivan), are supporters of the Vancouver Canucks of the National Hockey League (NHL). They are known for sitting beside the opposing team's penalty box during Canucks games at Rogers Arena wearing green full-body spandex suits. The suits are zentai, from the SuperFan Suit brand. Forsyth wears a neon green suit while Sullivan, the shorter of the two, wears a darker suit. The two were inducted into the ESPN Hall of Fans in 2012. They have also appeared in a Pepsi billboard advertisement, wearing Canucks jerseys.

== History ==
The idea for the Green Men started when the two friends decided to attend a National Football League game in Seattle. They ordered a pair of green suits to wear to the game after watching a Season 3 episode of the television program It's Always Sunny in Philadelphia in which character Charlie Kelly wears a similar suit. Sullivan's suit arrived a day after the football game, so the Green Men went to a Canucks game instead. The owner of the roofing company that Sullivan worked for had access to the seats beside the penalty box, which is how they continually got those seats. The owner provided more free tickets after the duo rose to fame, but they later began paying for them themselves. The Green Men entertain fans and annoy the opposition with their antics, which include handstands against the glass and the use of props such as a cutout of Carrie Underwood (when the Canucks play the Nashville Predators) or Vince Vaughn (when they play the Chicago Blackhawks) in a Canucks jersey.

Some of their antics have been:

- Throwing frozen waffles in the air when Toronto Maple Leafs forward Tim Brent took a penalty, referencing an angry Maple Leafs fan throwing waffles on the Air Canada Centre ice a week earlier.
- Showing a cutout of Vince Vaughn in a Canucks jersey in a playoff series against the Chicago Blackhawks in 2011.
- Butt flossing a Blackhawks jersey during a 2010 playoff series against the Blackhawks.
- Holding up a sign saying 'Which Way to the Roxy?' when Nashville Predators defenceman Shane O'Brien was in the penalty box during their 2011 playoff series, a reference to O'Brien frequenting a bar of that name when he played for the Canucks.

=== 2009–2010 season ===
Their first appearance was when the Nashville Predators stopped by Rogers Arena, then known as General Motors Place, on December 22, 2009. They attended 13 games during the 2009–10 Vancouver Canucks season. In 2011, Forsyth and Sullivan both finished their journalism program at the British Columbia Institute of Technology and are trying to break into the media business.

=== 2010–2011 season ===
The Green Men supported Canada at the 2010 Winter Olympics. They took photos of themselves wearing Canada jerseys.

=== 2011 playoffs ===
In May 2011, the duo were asked by the National Hockey League (NHL) to stop touching the glass and doing handstands, and would not be allowed to engage players verbally.

==== Conference Quarterfinals ====
Versus the Chicago Blackhawks

==== Conference semifinals ====
The morning of April 28, two Green Men impostors were set up near the north end of the George Massey Tunnel, a highway traffic tunnel in Metro Vancouver, approximately 20 km south of the city centre. Their antics disrupted traffic for hours, leading to Forsyth receiving "about 17 different phone calls from people telling me that I had ruined their morning commute," by the time he woke up—he was in Victoria at the time. CBC investigation tracked it down to a lighting replacement company; they dismissed claims they were responsible for the snarl.

==== Conference finals ====
Versus the San Jose Sharks

==== Finals ====
At Game 7, after the Boston win, the Green Men held a sign reading Their final tweet of the season read: "Dear rioters: You’re a disgrace to our city. Congratulations on the win Boston. We’re not all like this on the west coast."

The Green Men had planned to end their appearances, if the Canucks go all the way. Said Forsyth: "We have said from Day 1 we will hang with them until the Canucks win the [Stanley] Cup. [If t]he Canucks win the Cup this year, I am hanging up the suit. I will encourage it to be hung from the rafters at Rogers Arena. It won't happen, but I encourage it. If the Canucks lose, we will see what happens." Sullivan suggested that "Nothing is official. We haven't made a joint decision just yet. If one guy goes down, then the ship goes down with him."

=== 2011–2012 season ===
On December 1, 2011, the Green Men returned for a Canucks home game against the Nashville Predators. In the first period, when Predators defenseman and captain Shea Weber was sent to the penalty box, the Green Men were waiting with a cardboard cutout of Canucks center Ryan Kesler's nude pose from ESPN The Magazine's The Body Issue. They attended two other regular season games.

During the playoffs, the Green Men held a Twitter contest, where winners would receive prizes in person from Sullivan. They endorsed a gel bracelet wristband promotion at Blenz Coffee locations in Greater Vancouver, supporting the BC Cancer Foundation Underwear Affair.

Sullivan and Forsyth were both also seen at the Davis Cup during the 2012 games when Canada had lost against France in Vancouver.

=== 2012–2013 season ===
Sophie Tweed-Simmons appeared in one of the duo's acts, a magic trick where one man disappeared behind a green curtain, with the singer magically appearing as a replacement.

The duo appeared in Pepsi advertising, in a series of ads including Mohan Singh Vinning (PunJohnny Canuck) and Amie Nguyen (Queen Canuck).

=== 2014–2015 season ===
On November 7, 2014, the Green Men announced they would retire at the end of the season.

=== 2019–2020 season ===
Since October 2019, the duo is commenting NFL games through their podcast at the World Sports Network site.

=== 2023–2024 season ===
After an 8-season absence, the Green Men came out of retirement on February 24, 2024, for a surprise return to Rogers Arena. This coincided, of course, with the one and only time the Canucks hosted the Boston Bruins that season. On February 25, 2024, Force stated in an interview with David Quadrelli of CanucksArmy that as it stands, the return of the Green Men would be for one night only, as Sully now lives with his family in Saskatoon, Saskatchewan and works full-time, making attending games in Vancouver difficult. Force added that the duo have not ruled out returning again for the playoffs, and have already been asked by the team about the possibility of them doing so; however, on May 8, 2024, during the Canucks' first game of the Western Conference semifinal against the Edmonton Oilers in the 2024 Stanley Cup playoffs, the pair made another surprise visit to Rogers Arena.

== NHL reaction ==
According to Hockey Night in Canada's Hot Stove Panel, the Green Men received a warning from the NHL that the acts that they were committing needed to be "toned down" at future games. More specifically, they have been asked not to touch the glass of the penalty box or perform handstands against it anymore. There has been no confirmation as to whether or not the NHL contacted Forsyth and Sullivan directly, or whether the Nashville Predators filed a complaint towards the league during the 2011 playoffs. Although the Hockey Night in Canada analysts have different perspectives towards Forsyth and Sullivan, Eric Francis said he believes that the Green Men are paying fans and have a right to be there. "They have done nothing wrong. All they're doing is adding to the ambiance and the atmosphere of a game, which is what makes a game so fun... a stadium so fun." A Facebook group has been set up to save the duo and to ensure that they keep doing what they're doing.

After the first game in the Canucks' conference semifinal series of the 2024 Stanley Cup playoffs against the Edmonton Oilers, the Oilers reportedly complained to the NHL about the duo holding up a sign in the penalty box glass referring to Evander Kane's gambling allegations; the duo were reportedly banned from attending the remainder of the playoff series.

== Behind the Green ==
Sullivan wrote the 2012 book Behind the Green and has hosted book signings in support of the BC Cancer Foundation.

== See also ==
- Ice Bucket Challenge, which Force took while bungee jumping
