= Catsuit =

One-piece form-fitting garment

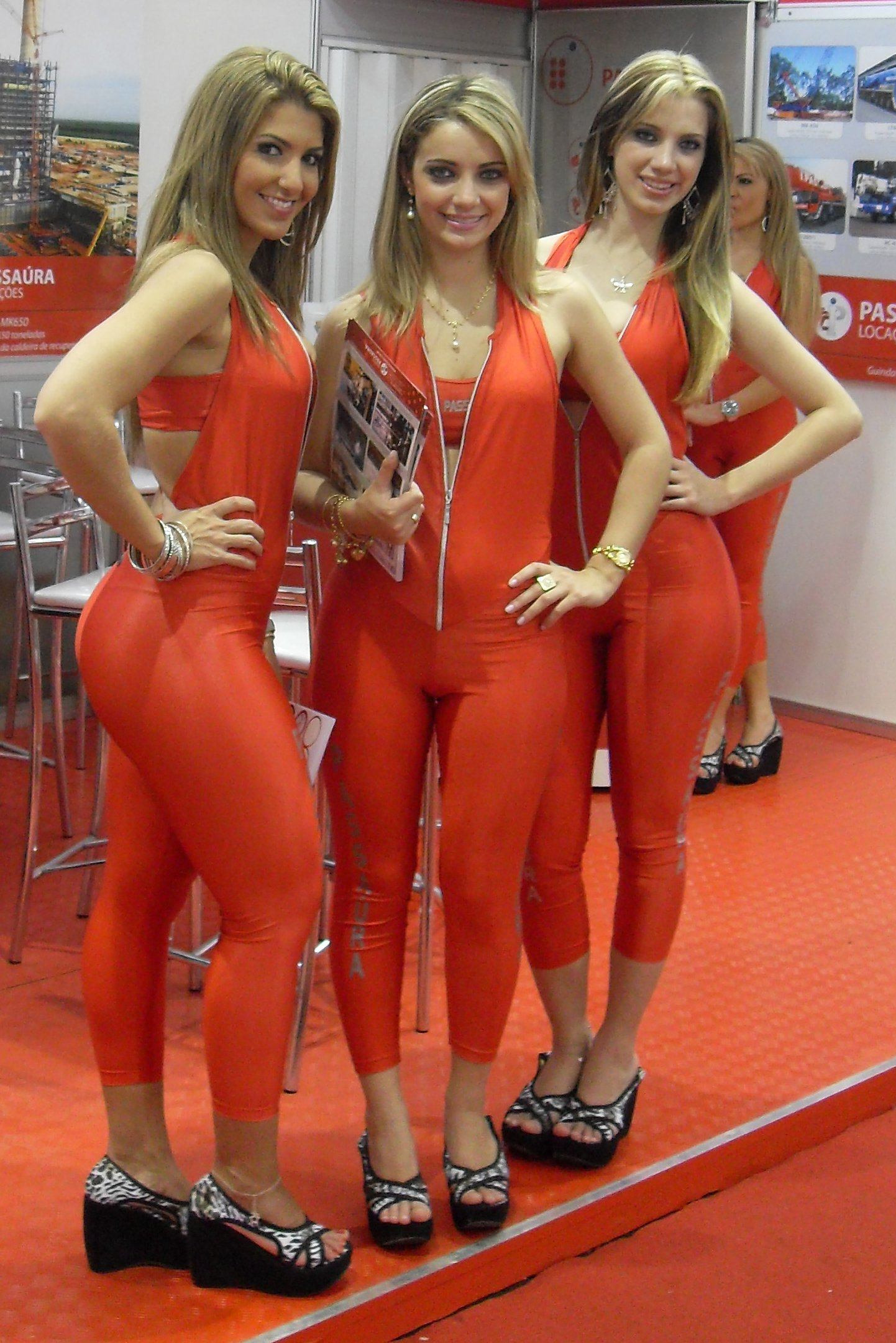
Promotional models in sleeveless catsuits

A catsuit is a one-piece form-fitting garment that covers the torso and the legs, and frequently the arms. They are usually made from stretchable material, such as lycra, chiffon, spandex (after 1959), latex, or velour, but may use less elastic materials, such as leather or PVC. Catsuits frequently close by means of a zipper at the front or back. They are often worn in a fetish context.

== History and use ==
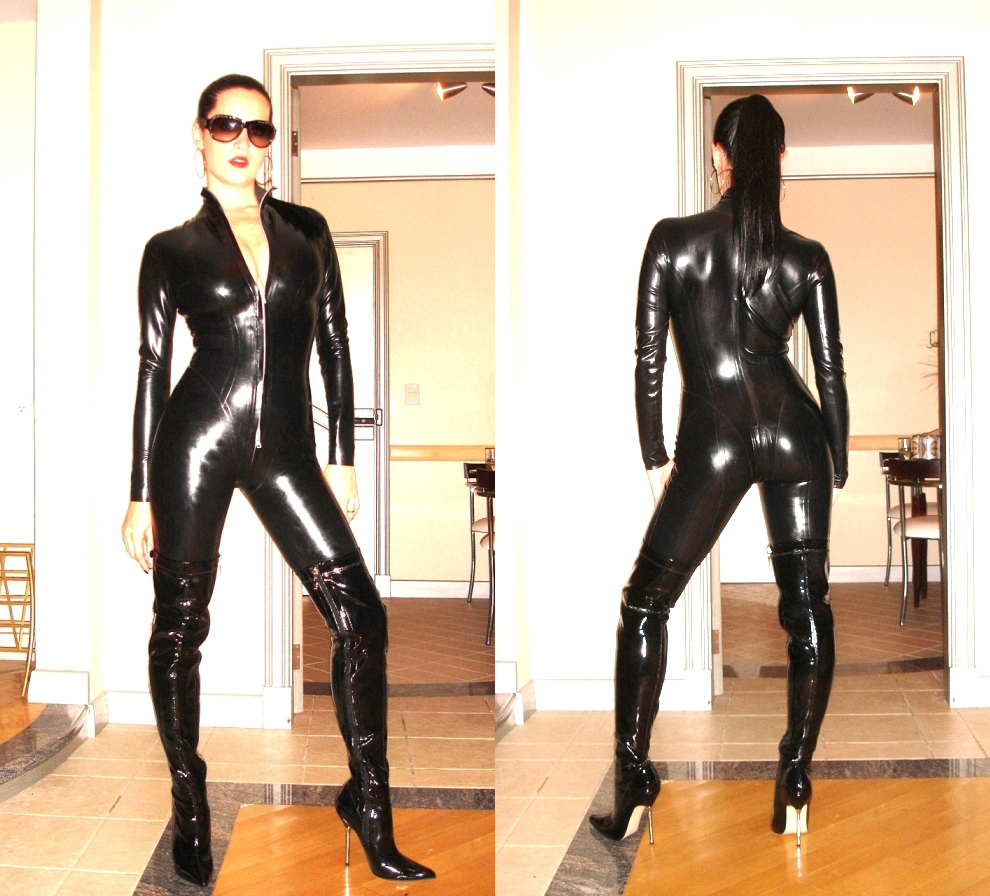
A woman wearing a black plastic zip front latex fetish catsuit and thigh-high boots

Catsuits were occasionally worn as a fashion item at various times from the 1960s to the 1990s. During the 1970s and 1980s, they were worn for aerobics and disco dancing. Around 1980, disco dance catsuits briefly became a street fashion item in the United Kingdom.

Athletes in sports such as speed skating, bobsled, winter triathlon, ski-racing, cycling, bodyflight, skysurfing and gymnastics wear garments similar to catsuits, called unitards, which are specifically geared to the needs of the sport involved. Also similar in appearance are wetsuits and drysuits used by scuba divers, and the speedsuits used by competitive swimmers before the more extreme forms of the suit were banned. Also, in tennis Serena Williams would sometimes wear catsuits, two examples are the 2002 US Open and the 2018 French Open.

The name "catsuit" is attributed only since about 1955 or 1960. Originally, they were called bodysuits. The origin of the name is unknown; it may refer to a slinky, catlike aspect given the wearer by some versions. It may also relate to the association with antiheroine Catwoman whose costume from the 1950s onward is a modified catsuit.

== In popular culture ==
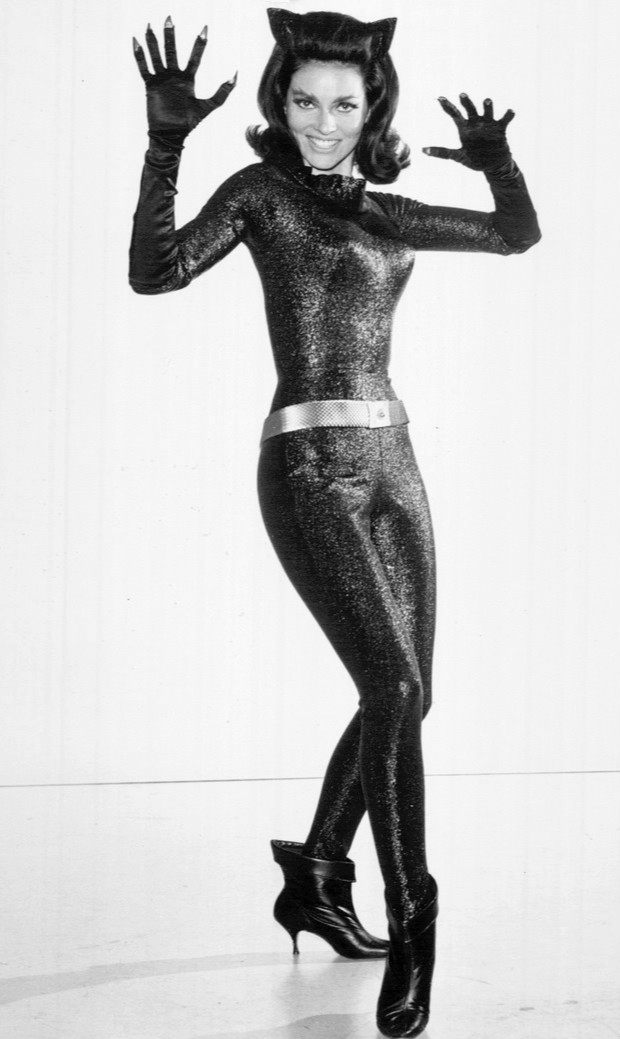
Actress Lee Meriwether as Catwoman in 1966 is wearing a catsuit that is also a cat suit.

== See also ==
- Bodystocking
- Bodysuit
- Bondage suit
- Fetish fashion
- Jumpsuit
- Latex and PVC fetishism
- Latex clothing
- Leggings
  - Leg warmers
  - Tights
- Long underwear
- PVC clothing
- Spandex fetishism
- Unitard
- Wetsuit
- Zentai
