= Foundation garment =

Undergarment designed to mold and shape the body to a fashionable silhouette

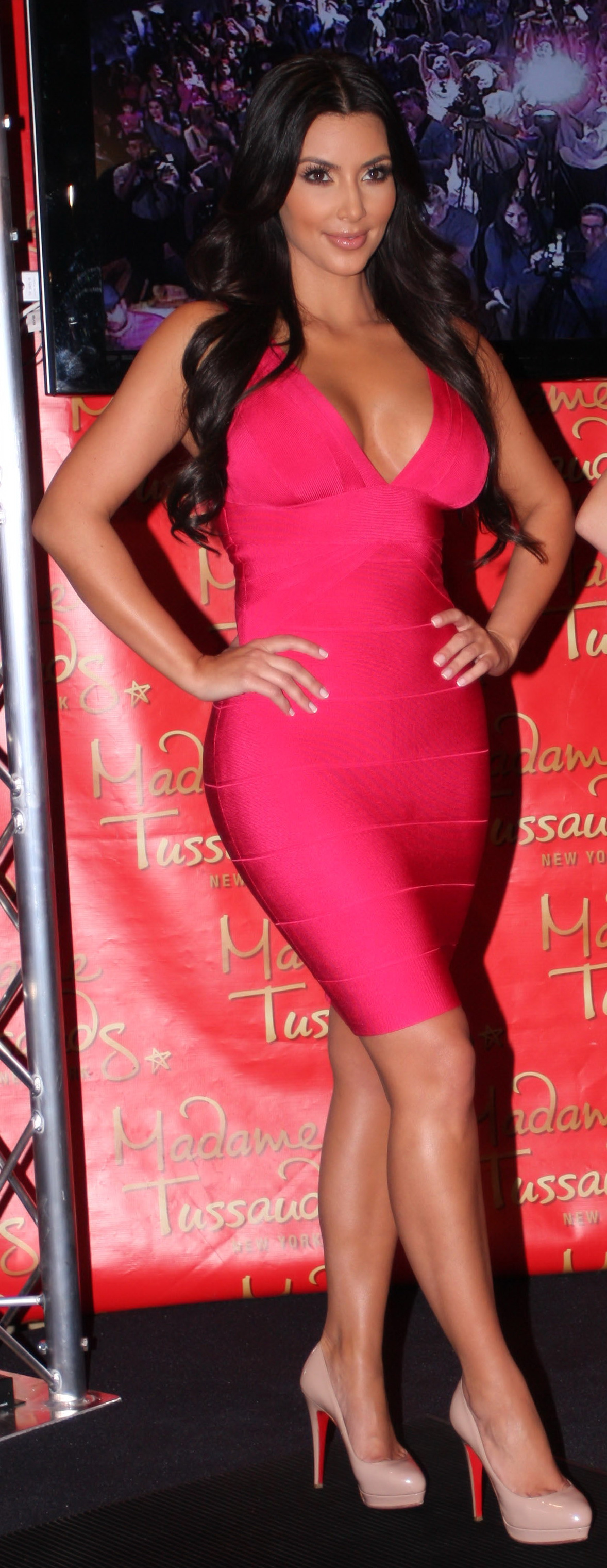
Kim Kardashian in shapewear-dress

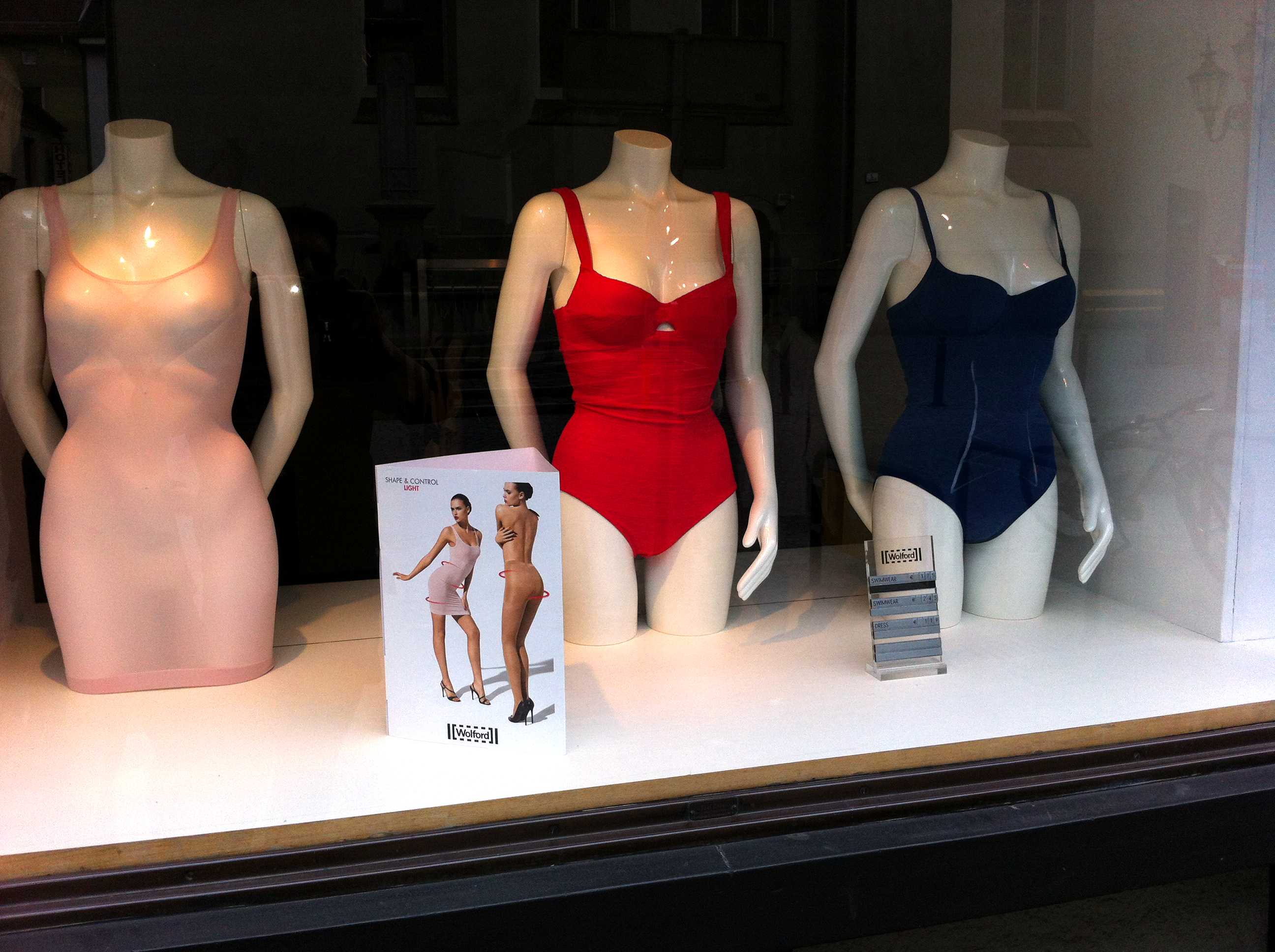
Wolford shop front displaying shapewear collection

A foundation garment (also known as shapewear or shaping underwear) is an undergarment designed to alter the wearer's body shape, to achieve a more fashionable figure or for gender affirmation.

Specific styles of foundation garments have been essential to some fashion movements, and were required in some social situations during various fashion periods.

== History ==
The concept of foundation garments dates back millennia, with early forms waist control and bust support being worn to shape and control the body's appearance. In ancient civilizations, such as Greece and Rome, women utilized binding materials to enhance their figures. Over time, corsets and their predecessors, such as laced kirtles, pairs of bodies, and stays, became popular during the Middle Ages and evolved into the Victorian era. Foundation garments have always been used to achieve a specific silhouette, but the desired shapes got more dramatic as technology improved and allowed for tightlacing.

Women have worn foundation garments, such as corsets and brassieres, for a very long time. Including this mid 20th century foundation garment patented by Marion M Chubby in 1965 (categorized in elastic corsets).

In the early 20th century, the invention of elastic materials and the introduction of new designs led to the development of modern shapewear. The Roaring Twenties brought about the "flapper" style, which involved a looser silhouette, but foundation garments such as bras, girdles, and slips were still used to control and shape the body. In the mid-20th century, advancements in fabric technology and the women's liberation movement led to more comfortable and practical options for shaping garments.

== Description ==
Foundation garments are worn to modify body shape. They usually require technological advances in garment design and lightweight fabrics to create different body figures. A foundation garment may be worn for a specific outfit. Being underwear, the foundation garment should not be visible under the outerwear. A general-purpose "all the way" shaper with clear straps that starts at the bust and ends at the knee or mid-calf is also available.

Foundation garments may come with a built-in strapless bra for dresses and halters.

In a broader definition, a foundation garment is a piece of garment that provides body-redefining shapes such as a bra.

Garments may be categorized according to level of shape control offered, for instance, light, medium, or firm. The simplest foundation is a body-liner or bodysuit, which is an ultra-light-weight leotard and offers a light touch of smoothing. These are available in a unitard style (shortened legs) or a camisole-leotard style. The leotard is available in boy-leg and capri-leg lengths, with spaghetti straps, low cut necklines, and even scoop backs, to cater to the outerwear under which the garments will be worn. These softly smooth the figure and provide light support. Micro-fiber camisoles and boy-leg briefs or "hot pants" are also available. Girdles are often called "body shapers" or "contour garments". These garments are made with more Lycra spandex as compared to the 10% Lycra / 90% cotton blend of most leotards, and they offer the highest level of shaping and support.

== Types of foundation garment ==
Foundation garments come in a variety of styles and designs to cater to different body shapes and clothing needs. Some common types include:

- Corsets: Traditional corsets, worn around the waist, provide shaping and cinching effects to create an hourglass figure.
- Girdles extend from the waist to the hips or thighs, providing control and shaping for the lower abdomen, hips, and buttocks.
- Control panties are designed to target the lower abdomen and hips, providing a seamless and smooth appearance under clothing.
- Body shapers are one-piece garments that shape the entire torso, including the abdomen, waist, hips, and sometimes the thighs.
- Thigh shapers focus on shaping and smoothing the thighs, providing control and support for a slimmer appearance.

== Fabric and construction ==
Foundation garments are constructed using various fabrics, depending on the desired level of control, comfort, and breathability. Common materials include nylon, spandex, Lycra, and cotton blends like coutil, canvas, and calico. Many modern shapewear pieces incorporate seamless construction techniques to minimize visible lines under clothing and enhance comfort.

== See also ==
- Lingerie
