= Jules Léotard =

French entertainer

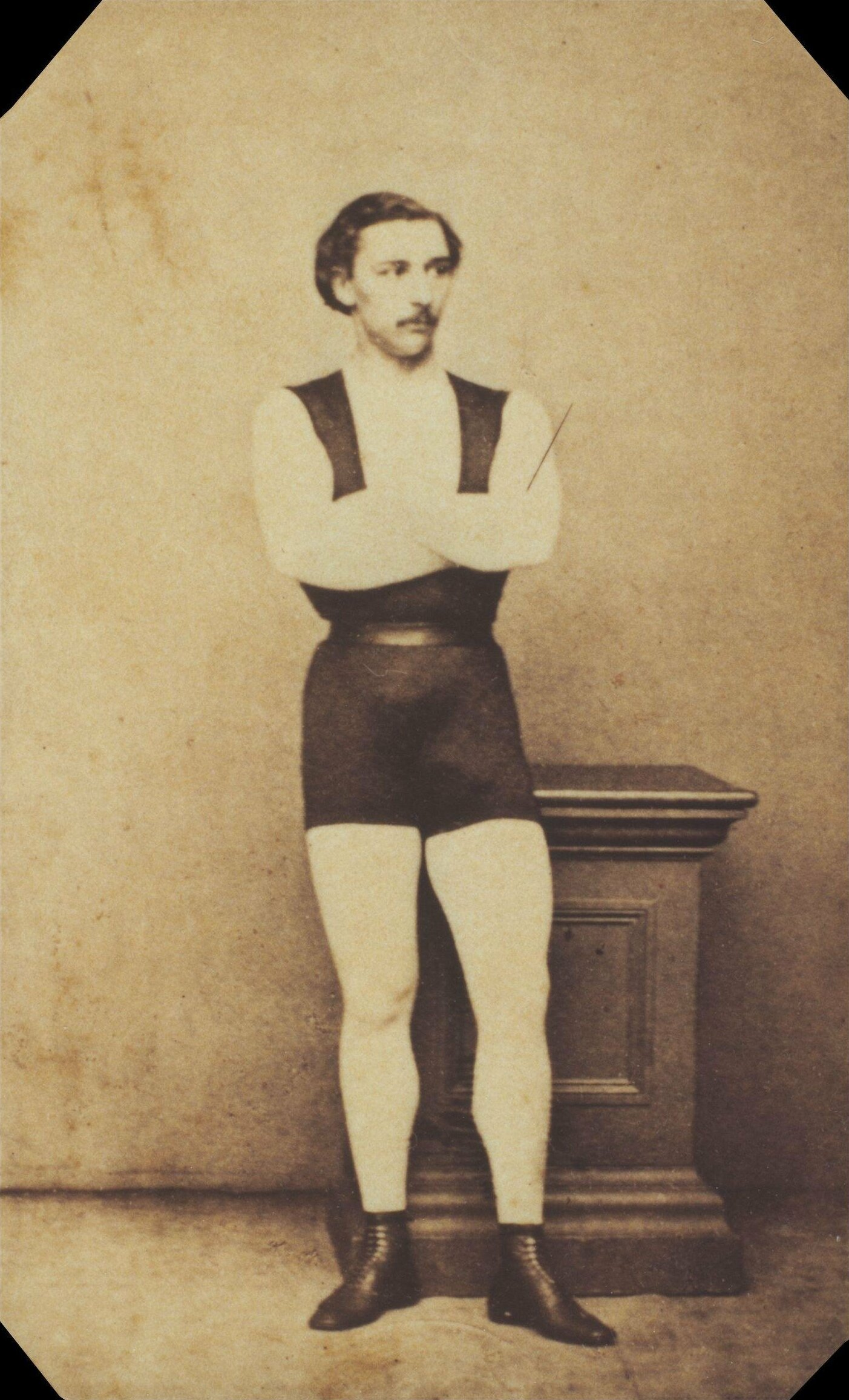
- Born: Jules Léotard; 1 August 1838; Toulouse, France
- Died: 16 August 1870 (aged 32); Toulouse, France
- Known for: Trapeze; Acrobatics

Jules Léotard (French: [leɔtaʁ]; 1 August 1838 – 16 August 1870) was a French acrobatic performer and aerialist who developed the art of trapeze. He also created and popularized the one-piece gym wear that bears his name and inspired the 1867 song "The Daring Young Man on the Flying Trapeze", sung by George Leybourne.

== Biography ==
Léotard was born in Toulouse, France, the son of a gymnastics instructor who ran a swimming pool in Toulouse. Léotard would practice his routines over the pool. He went on to study law.

After he passed his law exams, he seemed destined to join the legal profession, but at age 18 he began to experiment with trapeze bars, ropes, and rings suspended over a swimming pool. He later joined the Cirque Napoléon.

On 12 November 1859, the first flying trapeze routine was performed by Jules Léotard on three trapeze bars at the Cirque Napoléon.

In 1861, he performed in London at the Alhambra music hall. His approach did not stress the risk he took, but emphasized the "ease and grace" of his trapeze work, inspiring not fear but wonder.

The costume he invented was a one-piece knitted garment streamlined to suit the safety and agility concerns of trapeze performance. It also showed off his physique, impressed spectators, and took on his name.

At age twenty-four in July 1862, Léotard married a Tuscan actress named Silvia Bernini, whom he had met earlier in January. They bought an estate in France and met each other's families. Yet by June 1864, Léotard, who was on a trip in Paris, informed Bernini via telegraph that he was seeking a divorce. Bernini traveled to Paris to speak with her husband, but they only argued more. Bernini then went to a hotel, disguised herself as a servant, and "cut off her hair, sent it to her husband in a parcel, and attempted to commit suicide by throwing herself into the Seine." She survived. The two ultimately divorced.

Léotard inspired the 1867 song The Daring Young Man on the Flying Trapeze, made popular by George Leybourne.

He was also a pioneer of cycling in France right before his death at age 32.

According to notes from the Victoria and Albert Museum, Léotard died in 1870 from an infectious disease (possibly smallpox). His funeral was held on 17 August 1870 in Toulouse, with the funeral procession departing from his residence on the Boulevard Napoléon.
