= Bodystocking =

One-piece, skin-tight garment made of knitted or stretch material

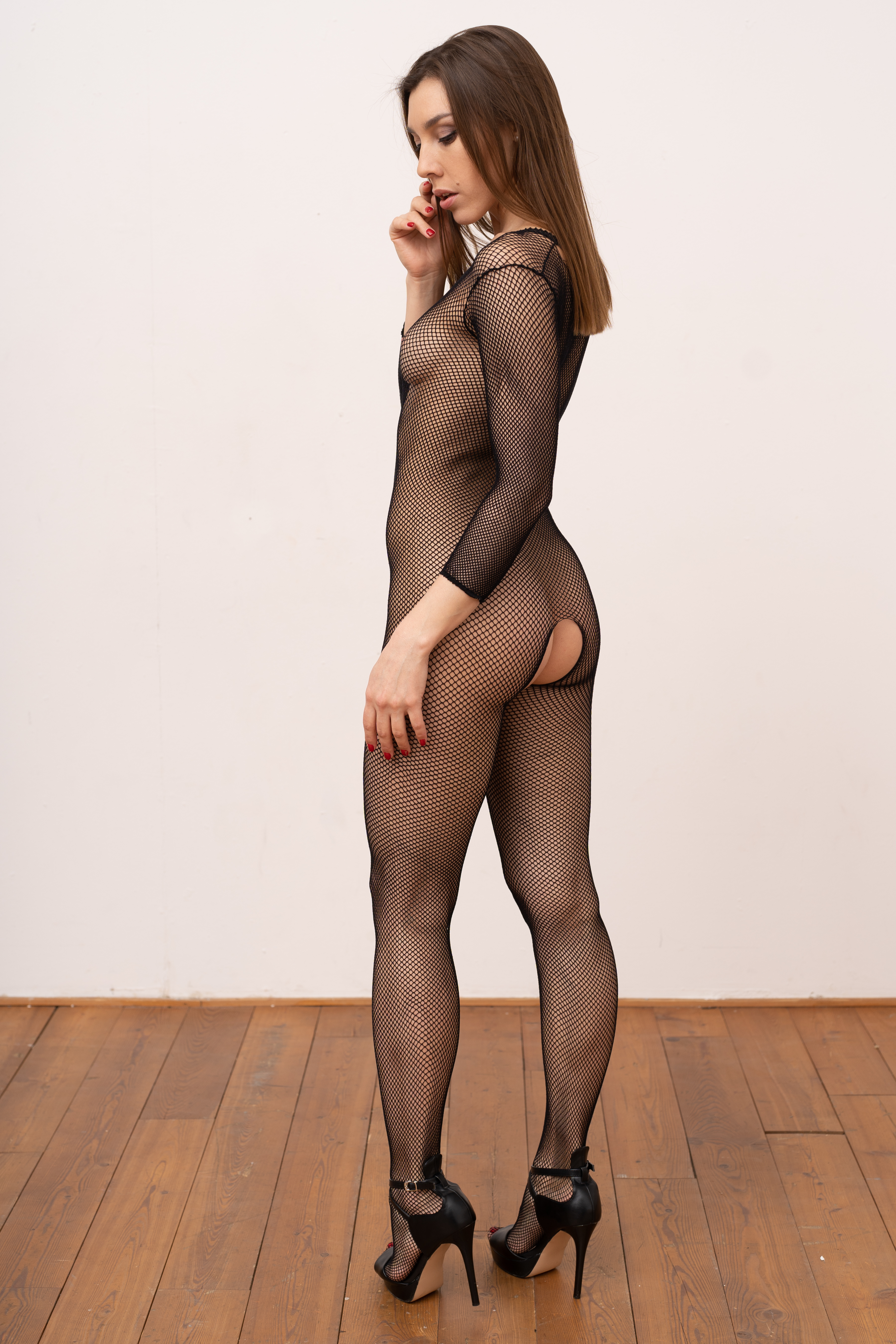
Bodystocking

A bodystocking or body stocking is a one-piece skin-tight garment that covers the torso, legs and sometimes the arms of the wearer. It is a foundation garment or an article of lingerie usually made from a sheer fabric similar to that used for stockings or pantyhose, or from fishnet, lace or an opaque material, or a variation of these materials. A bodystocking differs from a unitard, which is worn as an outfit or article of clothing, and a leotard, which is used as a practice garment or performance costume for acrobats, gymnasts and other similar performers. Designed to be revealed, but not to be too revealing, bodystockings may be worn as undergarments by performers such as belly dancers and exotic dancers.

== Description ==
Oftentimes bodystockings are made of sheer fabric and are worn with or without undergarments such as a bra. Bodystockings normally come in only two sizes, especially when they use stretch material. A body stocking may be worn for the smooth line it gives or because it cannot become untucked from trousers or a skirt. When worn as underwear, it is usually not worn with other underwear. It may be worn with panties for extra coverage or a bra for extra support. Sheer body stockings are too revealing to be worn alone.

Opaque bodystockings can be worn in place of tights and a blouse. Bodystockings also come in fishnet, lace and satin, the latter which may just consist of the top portion of the bodystocking, allowing it to be worn underneath a suit jacket to serve as a blouse. These types of bodystockings are also made sheer, enabling the wearer to wear a more revealing outfit coupled with sheer coverage for line smoothing.

Bodystockings are put on through the neck, in a similar technique to putting on a pair of tights: the body and arm sections are rolled down and then the legs are scrunched up like stockings; one would put one foot in and pull the stocking part up, and then the same on the other leg; from the waist, the bodystocking is pulled up over the torso to the chest, and then the arms are scrunched up and put on in same way as the legs; and the garment is then adjusted as required, and any ribbons and fasteners tied.

Due to its design, and its close-fitting and one-piece aspect, the wearer may have to remove the bodystocking for excretion, but crotchless bodystockings are also available. If a bodystocking is a foundation garment, any over clothing will also need to be removed.

== History ==
It is unclear when the first bodystocking was made or when it was first worn.

The first notable occasion was when American actress Adah Isaacs Menken wore one in 1861 in the play Mazeppa, based on Byron's "Mazeppa", in which she played a Ukrainian man who was tied nude to the back of a wild horse by his enemies. In the scene Menken wore a flesh coloured bodystocking to preserve her modesty while giving the illusion of nudity. The practice created controversy.

A body stocking was used in a tableau vivant style short film The Birth of the Pearl (1901), which featured an unnamed long-haired young model wearing a flesh-coloured body stocking in a direct frontal pose and provided a provocative view of the female body.

Other problematic roles which have sometimes been facilitated by wearing a flesh-coloured body-stocking are those of Eve in Biblical dramas and Lady Godiva in carnivals.

== Gallery ==
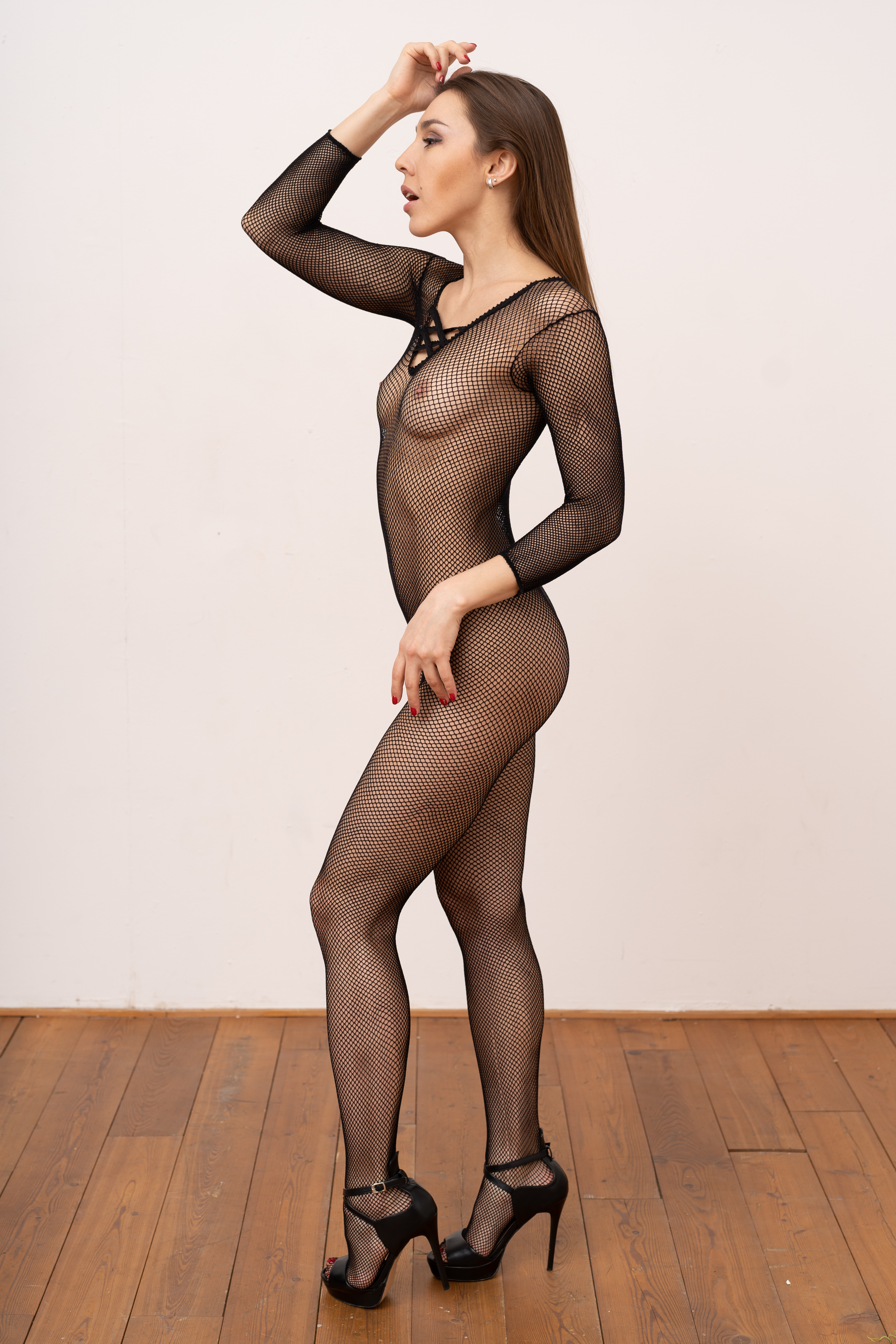
Alternate angle from model in main image

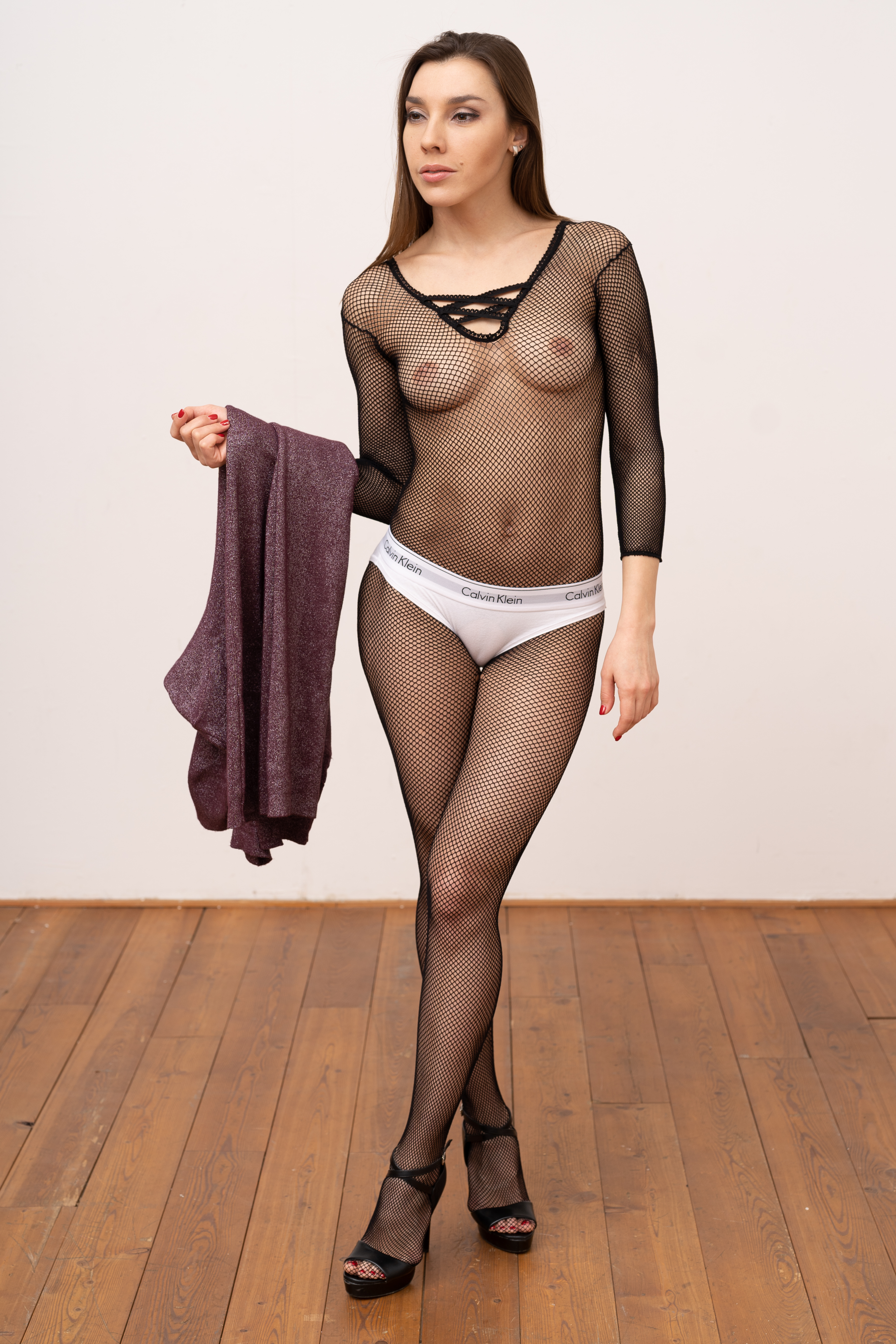
Fishnet bodystocking as it might be worn under a dress

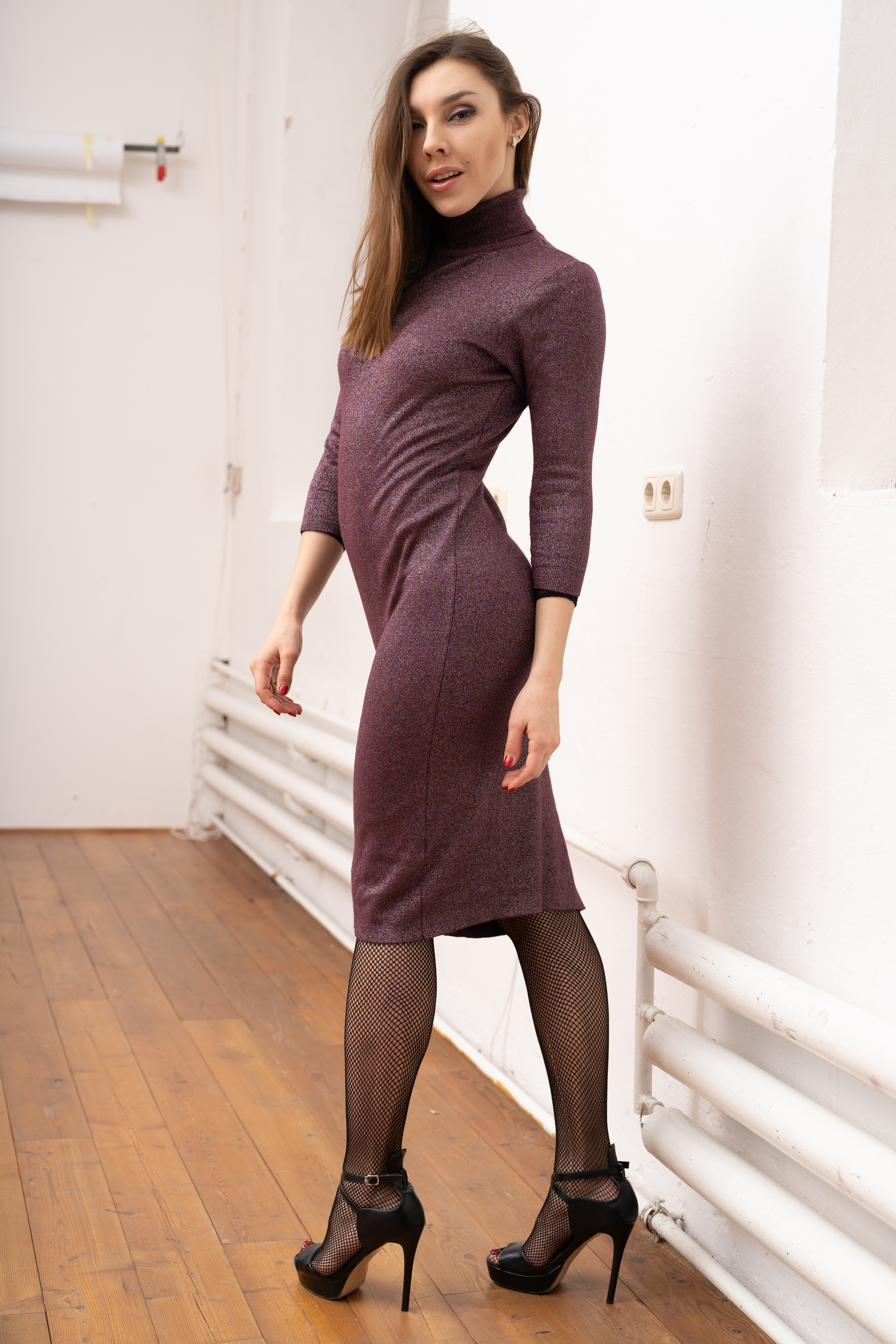
A bodystocking worn under a dress

== See also ==
- Bodysuit
- Zentai
