= Maillot =

Woman's one-piece swimsuit

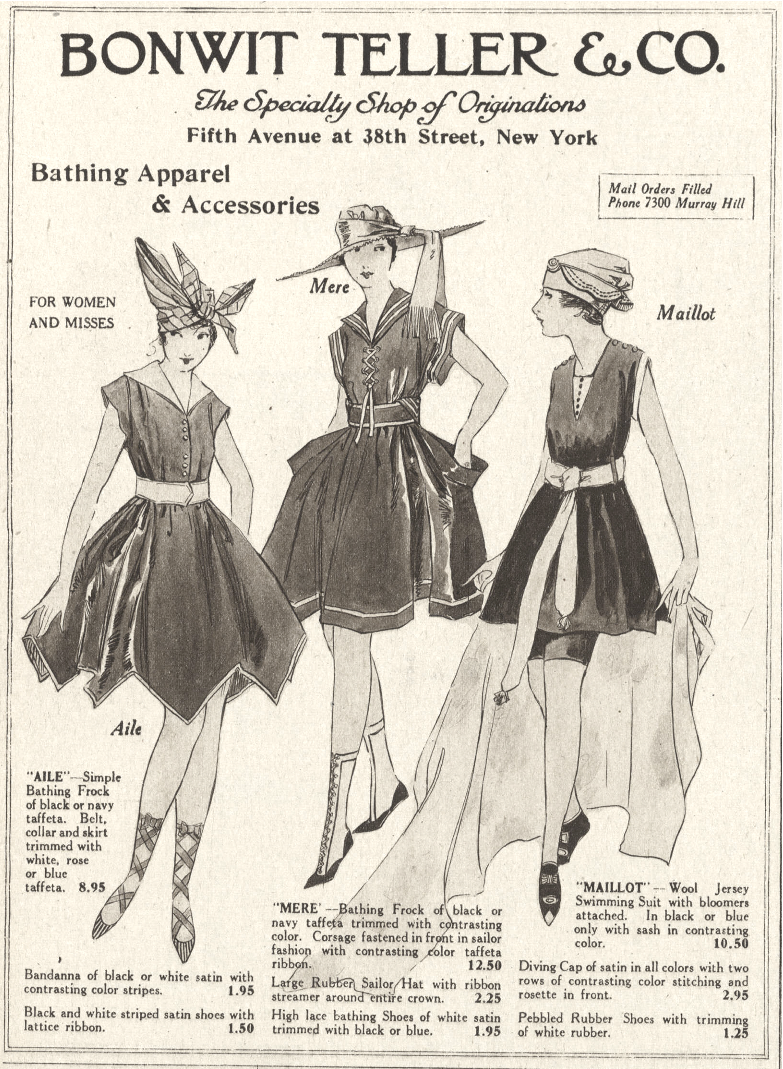
Historical advertisement for a maillot from 1916 (far right).

Maillot (UK: /mʌɪˈəʊ/; US: /maɪˈoʊ, maɪˈjoʊ/) is the fashion designer's name for a woman's one-piece swimsuit, also called a tank suit. A maillot swimsuit generally consists of a tank-style torso top with high-cut legs. However, a maillot may also include a plunging neckline, turtleneck-style top, or revealing cutouts.

In addition to describing women's one-piece swimsuits, the word maillot has also been used to refer to tights or leotards made of stretchable, jersey fabric, generally used for dance or gymnastics. The term maillot was first used to describe tight-fitting, one-piece swimsuits in the 1920s, as these swimsuits had been manufactured from a similar stretchable, jersey fabric.

== Modern usage ==
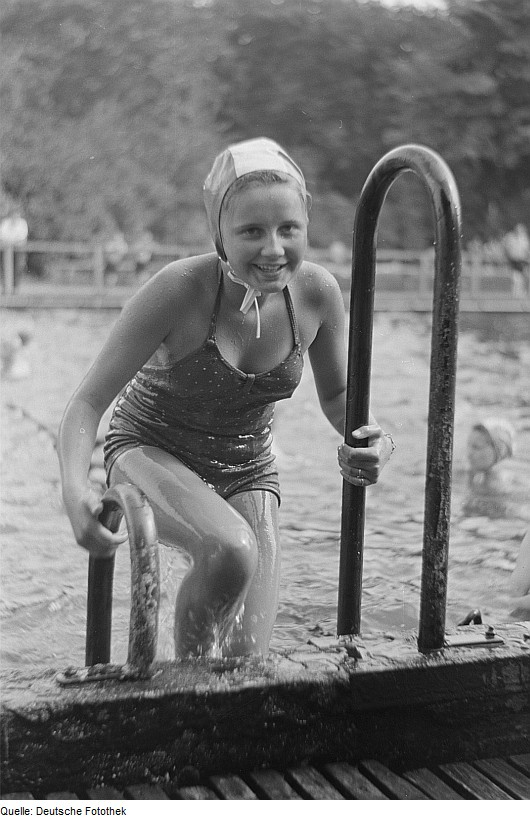
Young woman in a maillot (one-piece) swimsuit in Germany, 1950

In the present day, the phrase "one-piece swimsuit" has almost completely replaced the term "maillot" in colloquial language. While the word has now become somewhat obsolete in common language, fashion designers and consumers used it quite often in the early days of the modern swimsuit. It is now most often used to distinguish between several different types of one-piece swimsuits, including the tank maillot and the pretzel maillot. The term is also used in bicycle racing. For example, the leader of the Tour de France wears the maillot jaune, referring to the yellow jersey that the overall race leader is awarded after each leg of the race.

== Etymology ==
The term maillot was inducted into the English dictionary in 1928; it derived from the French phrase for swaddling clothes. In the French language, the word maillot means "shirt" and is used to distinguish leaders in the Tour de France. The modern French term for a swimsuit, maillot de bain, also makes use of the word.

The name "tanksuit" or "tank suit" (as well as "tank top") alludes to the "tank" or pool in which the wearer swims.

In colloquial Persian and Arabic, particularly in the Levant region, the term maillot (مايوه) is a generic term used to refer to a swimsuit for both men and women.

== See also ==
- Monokini
