= Unitard =

One-piece garment covering the torso, arms, and legs

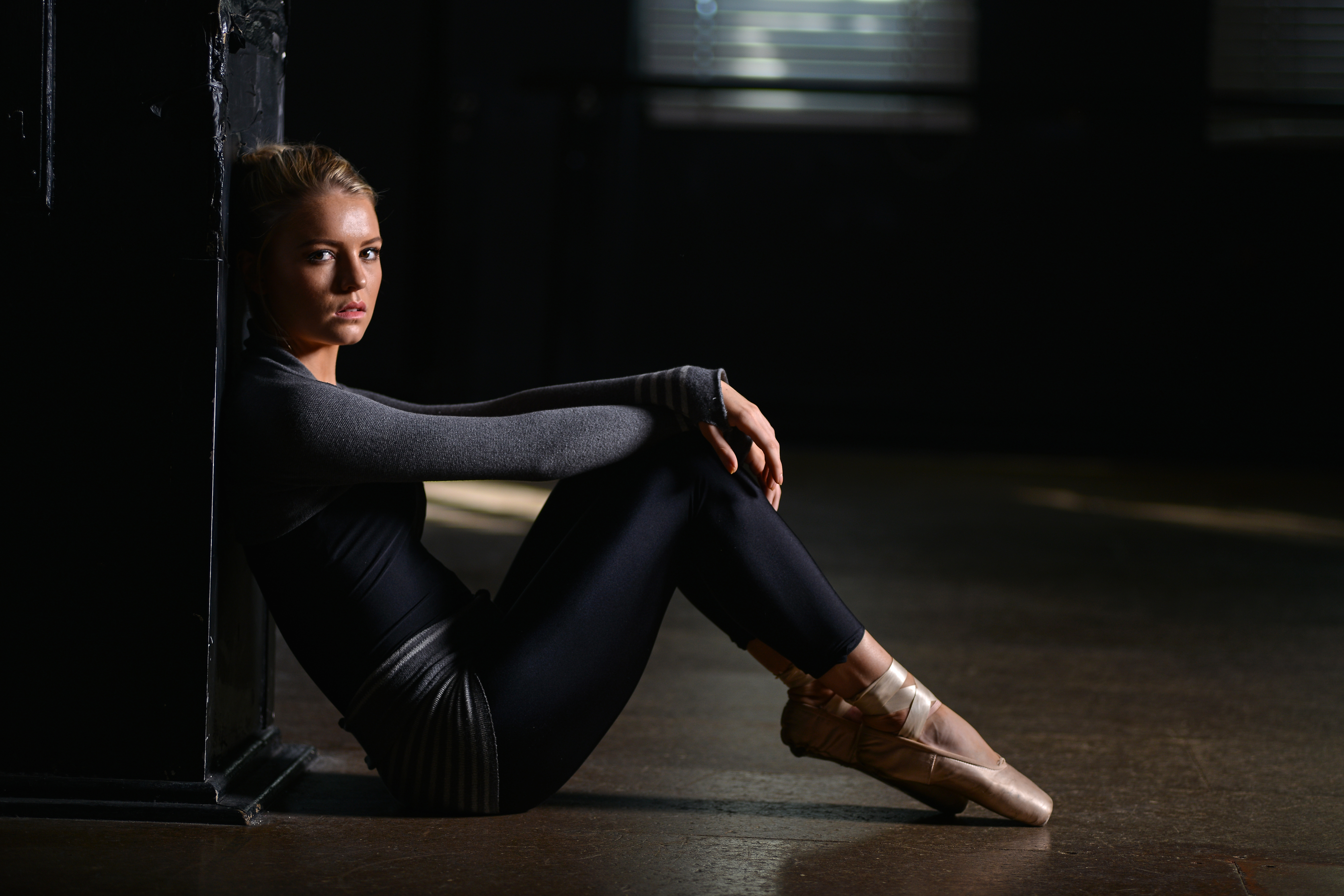
A dancer wearing a unitard, a shrug and pointe shoes.

A unitard is a skintight, one-piece garment with long legs and sometimes long sleeves, usually stopping at the wrists and ankles. It differs from a leotard which does not have long legs. The garment can be thought of as a combination of a leotard and leggings, and was historically called a "one-piece long legged leotard". The term unitard is mostly used in relation to sports, while it is usually referred to as a catsuit in other contexts.

== Usage in sports ==
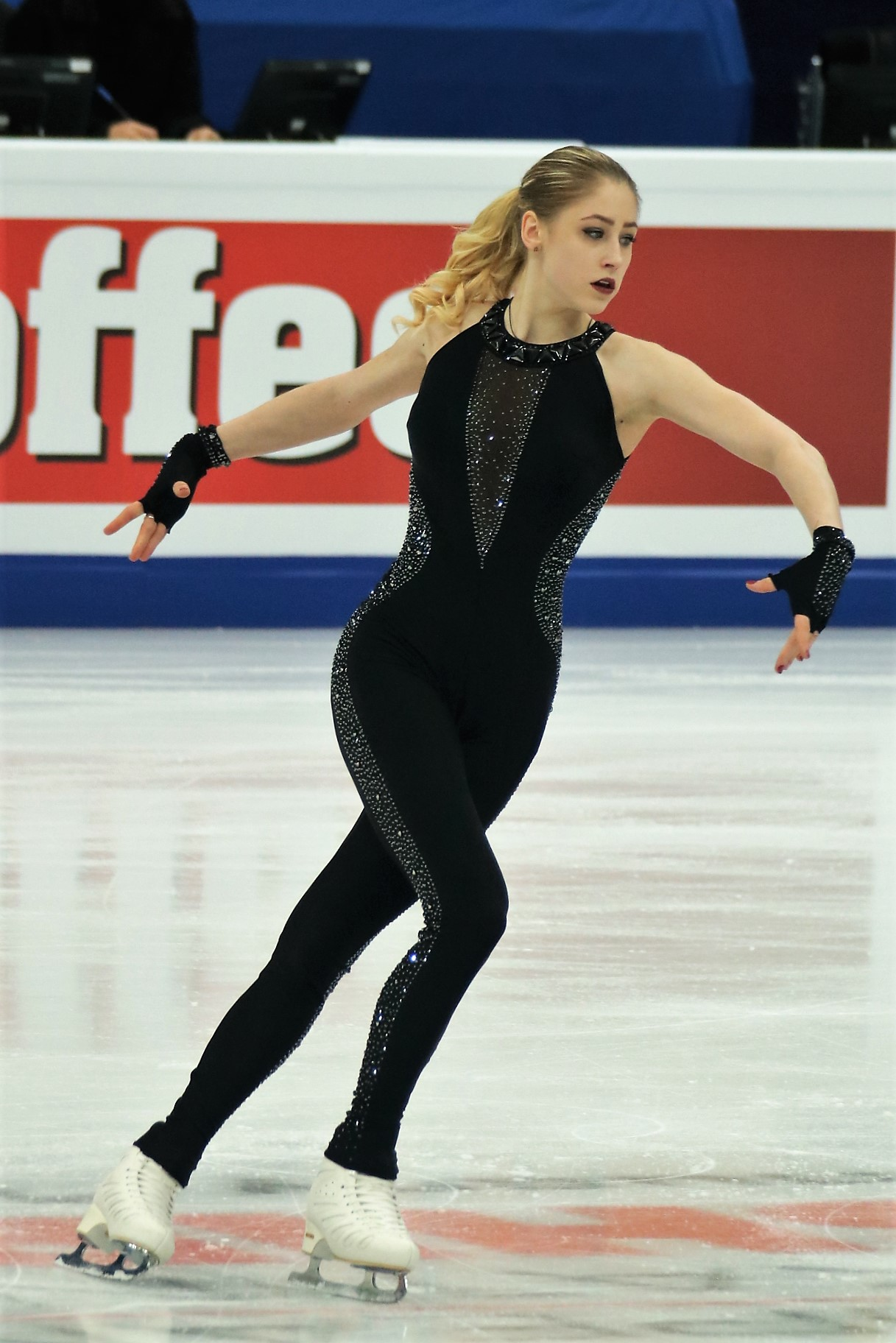
Figure skater Diāna Ņikitina wearing a sleeveless unitard.

Unitards are worn by acrobats, gymnasts, dancers, equestrian vaulters, contortionists, as well as others who require overall body coverage without impeding flexibility. It is closely related to the wrestling singlet, which is basically a unitard with shorter legs.

In 1985, Anne White's decision to wear a white unitard for the first two sets of a match in the Women's Singles Championship at Wimbledon was widely reported. Unitards remain an unusual sight in some sports such as tennis, although Serena Williams wore one during a 2013 Wimbledon practice, and during the 2018 French Open (after which the garment type was banned there). (Note: It is called a "catsuit" in the article, but should more appropriately have been called a "unitard".)

In the 1990s, wearing unitards in figure skating was "illegal in competition and discouraged in practice". And although modern rules allow them, they remain a rare sight in competitions, where dresses are seen as more appropriate by conservative judges.

The North Carolina State college men's basketball team wore a unitard designed by Nike shortly in 1989 under coach Jim Valvano "to address the issue of jerseys coming untucked", but they were retired after only two games.

Colourful unitards are the trademark of fitness coach Mr Motivator.

== Usage elsewhere ==
Superheroes in comics, ads, TV shows and films are frequently depicted wearing costumes that resemble unitards, although they are rarely called that explicitly. The members of the rock band Queen were known for wearing unitards during their concerts in the late 1970s. Some of the uniforms worn by female characters in the Star Trek franchise have been called unitards, and criticized for promoting sexiness.

== See also ==
- Bodystocking
- Bodysuit
- Jumpsuit
- Romper suit
- Swimsuit
- Yoga the Iyengar Way
- Zentai
