= Zentai =

Skin-tight full-body garment

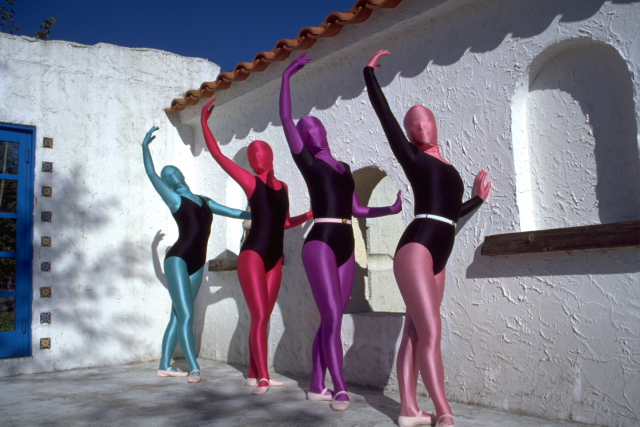
Four dancers in zentai

A zentai suit (from Japanese ゼンタイ zentai) is a skin-tight garment that covers the entire body. The word is a portmanteau of zenshin taitsu (Japanese: 全身タイツ, lit. 'full-body tights'). Zentai is most commonly made using nylon/spandex blends.

== Use ==
The costumes are seen at major sporting events in North America and the United Kingdom. They created internationally recognized personalities of The Green Men, two fans of the Vancouver Canucks NHL team. Various professional street dance/hip hop dance groups use the outfits, such as The Body Poets in the United States and Remix Monkeys in the United Kingdom.

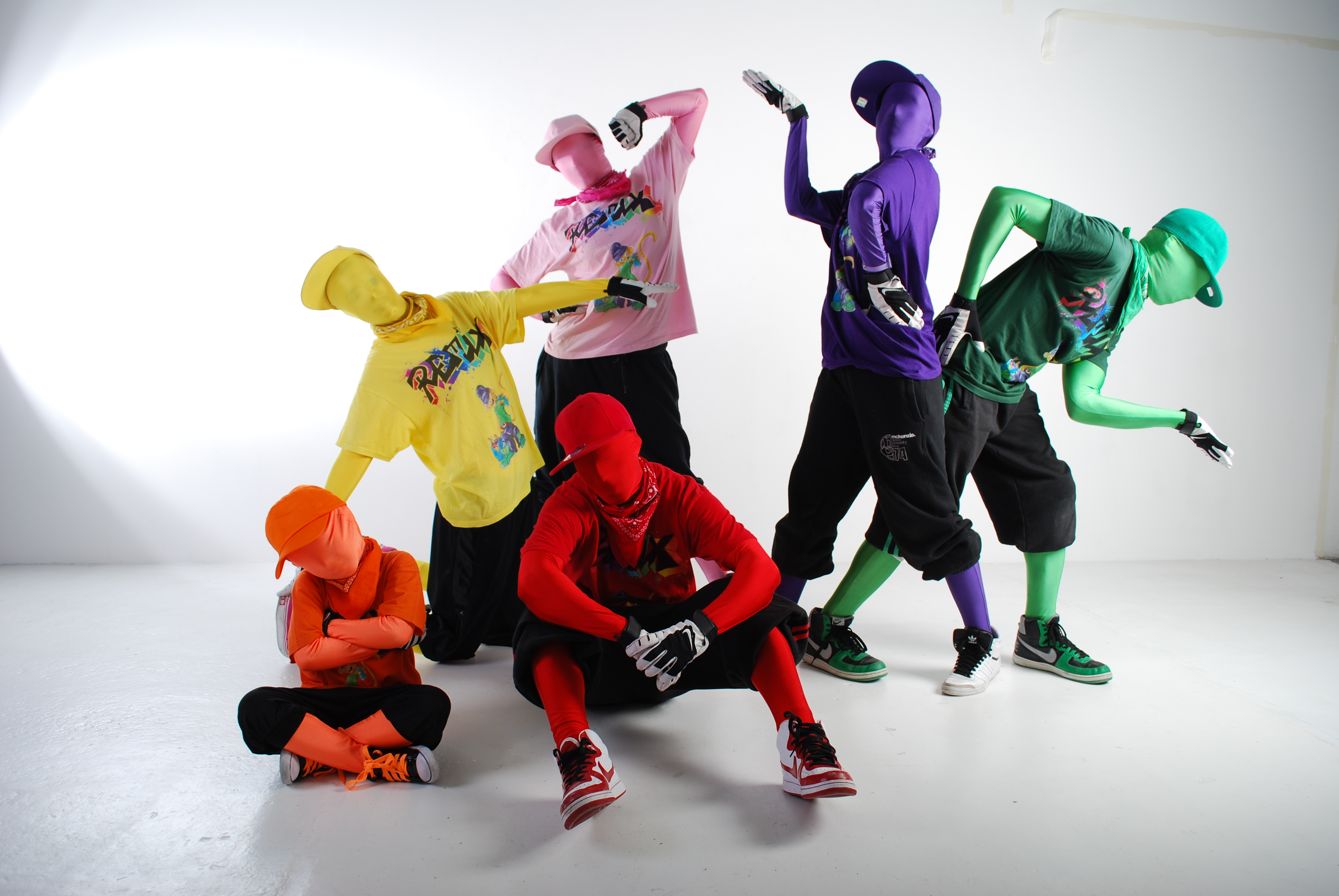
UK-based Remix Monkeys is a dance troupe that uses Morphsuits in their street dance routines

Full-body suits are used for video special effects: their unique colors enable the person wearing the chroma key suit to be digitally removed from a video image. Other applications have included music videos (Black Eyed Peas' song "Boom Boom Pow", including the live performance at the Super Bowl), breast cancer awareness, fashion modeling on an episode of America's Next Top Model, social anxiety workshops, television (Charlie Kelly as Green Man), a participant in public art project "One & Other", and social experiments.

=== Legal limitations ===
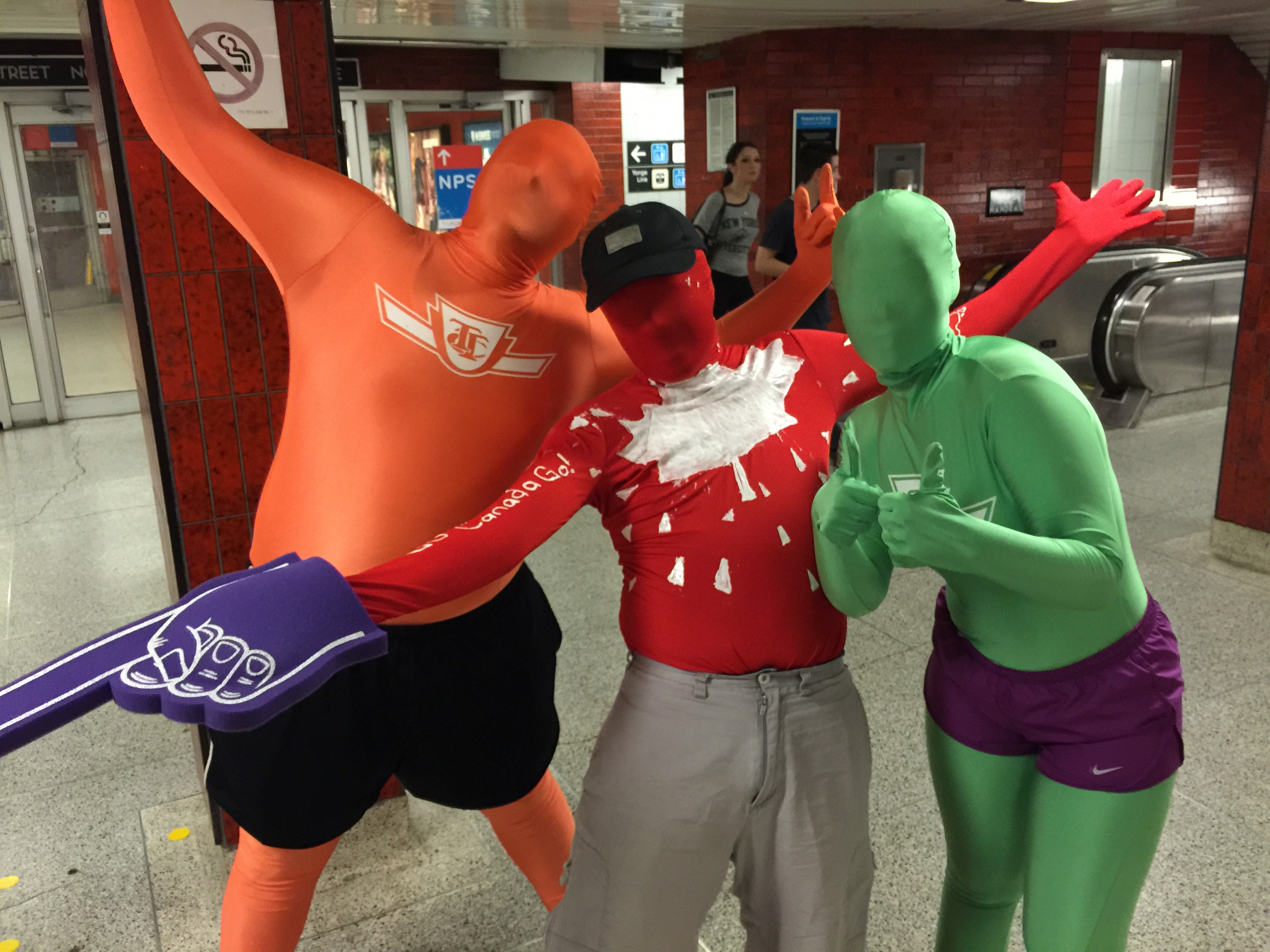
Two brand ambassadors for the Toronto Transit Commission, with a sports fan

Since zentai cover one's face, a fine of up to €150 may be imposed upon those who wear them publicly in France. Furthermore, some sports leagues, such as Major League Baseball, ban the use of the costume hoods.

== Brands ==
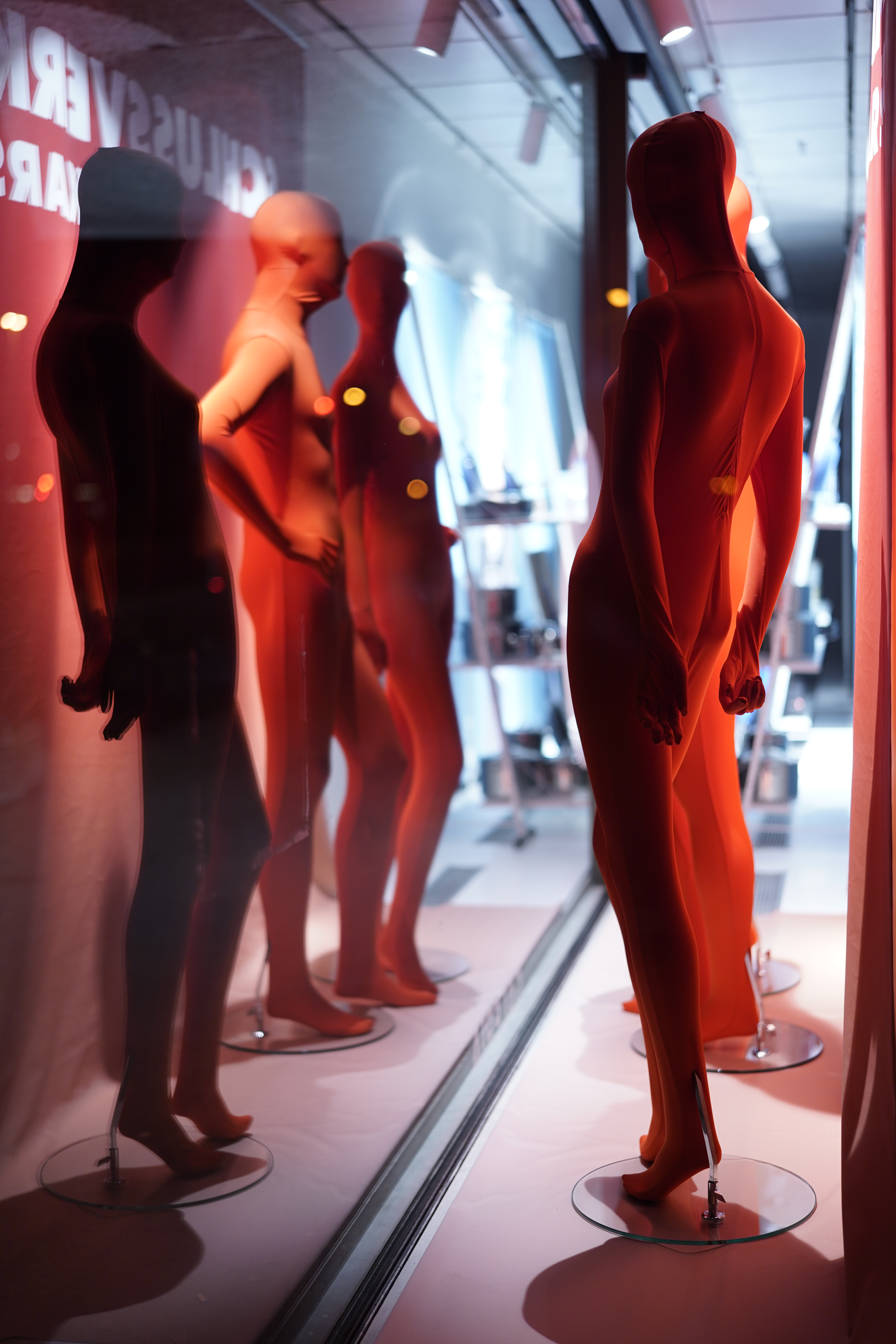
Red suits used to recolour mannequins to signal the winter sale

Companies have created brands of the suits including RootSuit or Superfan Suit in the United States, Bodysocks or Second Skins by Smiffy's and Morphsuits in the United Kingdom, and Jyhmiskin in Finland. Morphsuits has achieved relative commercial success internationally. Between January and late October 2010, the company shipped 10,000 to Canada alone. The Morphsuits brand has actively tried to disassociate themselves from the existing zentai community. Superfan Suits acknowledges in interviews that the outfits have existed previously. The term "morphsuit" has become a generic term in the process; one New Zealand-based newspaper refers to competing brand Jaskins as "one of the main online morphsuit brands." Jaskins company founder Josh Gaskin says their origins are unclear, pegging the first usage with It's Always Sunny in Philadelphia.

== See also ==
- Bodystocking
- Black light theatre, which can use all-black zentai attire for its performances
- Catsuit
- Cosplay
- Dancewear
- Kigurumi
- Spandex fetishism
- Morphsuits

Notable users of Zentai

- Pink Guy, musical artist
- Jonathan Bree, musical artist
- The Great Morgani, performance artist
- Pandemonia, performance artist
- Green Man, mascot alter-ego of Charlie Kelly in It's Always Sunny in Philadelphia
