= Leotard =

One-piece garment that covers the torso

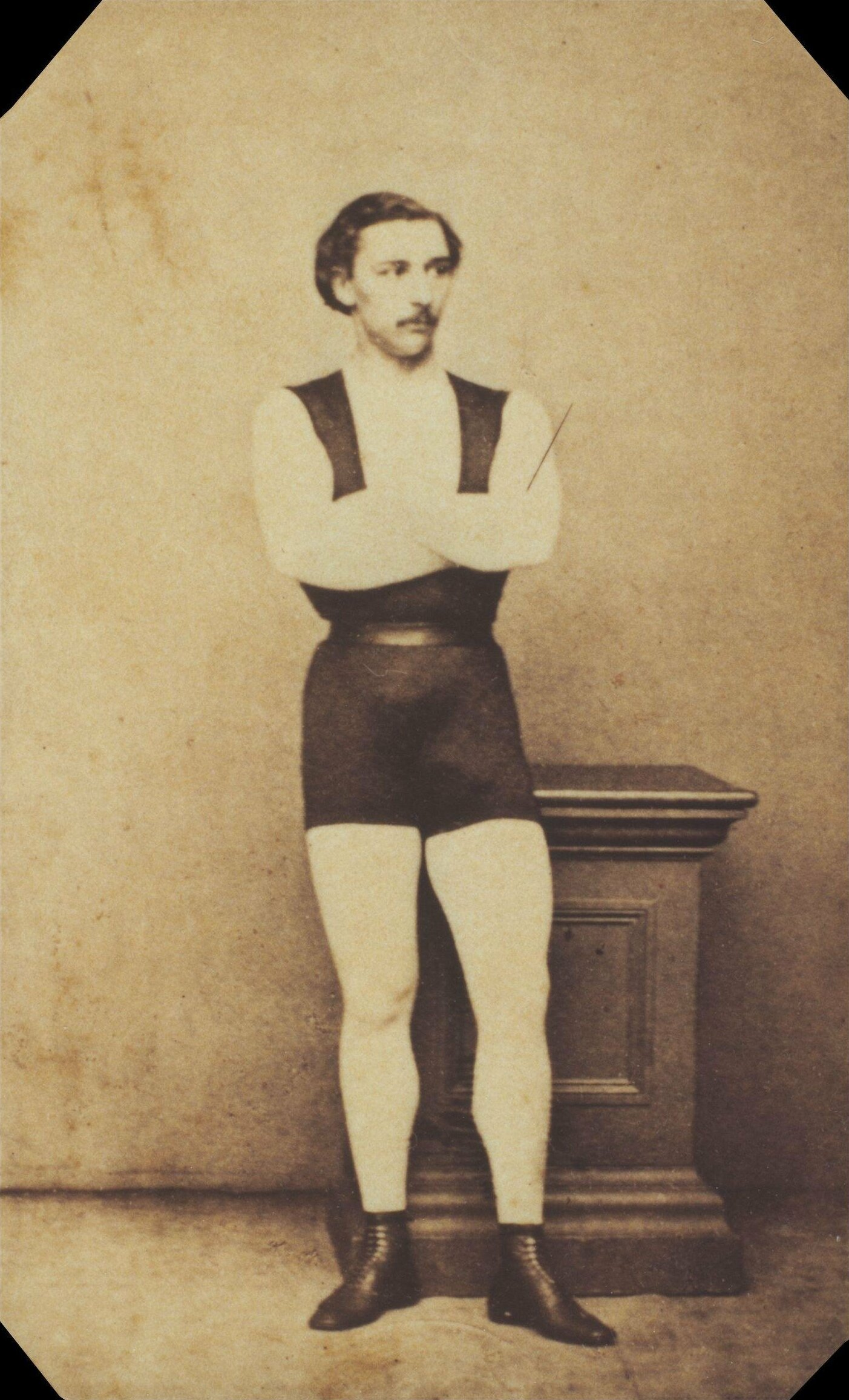
Jules Léotard in the garment that bears his name

A leotard (/ˈliːətɑːrd/) is a unisex one-piece skin-tight garment that covers the torso from the crotch to the shoulder. The garment was made famous by the French acrobatic performer Jules Léotard (1838–1870). There are sleeveless, short-sleeved, and long-sleeved leotards. A variation is the unitard, which also covers the legs. It provides a degree of modesty and style while allowing for freedom of movement.

Leotards are worn by acrobats, gymnasts, dancers, figure skaters, athletes, actors, wrestlers and contortionists both as practice garments and performance costumes. They are often worn with ballet skirts on top and tights or sometimes cycling shorts as underwear. As a casual garment, a leotard can be worn with a belt and under overalls or short skirts.

Leotards are entered by stepping into the legs and pulling the sleeves over the shoulders. Scoop-necked leotards have wide neck openings and are held in place by the garment's elasticity. Others are crew necked or polo necked and close at the back of the neck with a zipper or snaps.

== Use ==
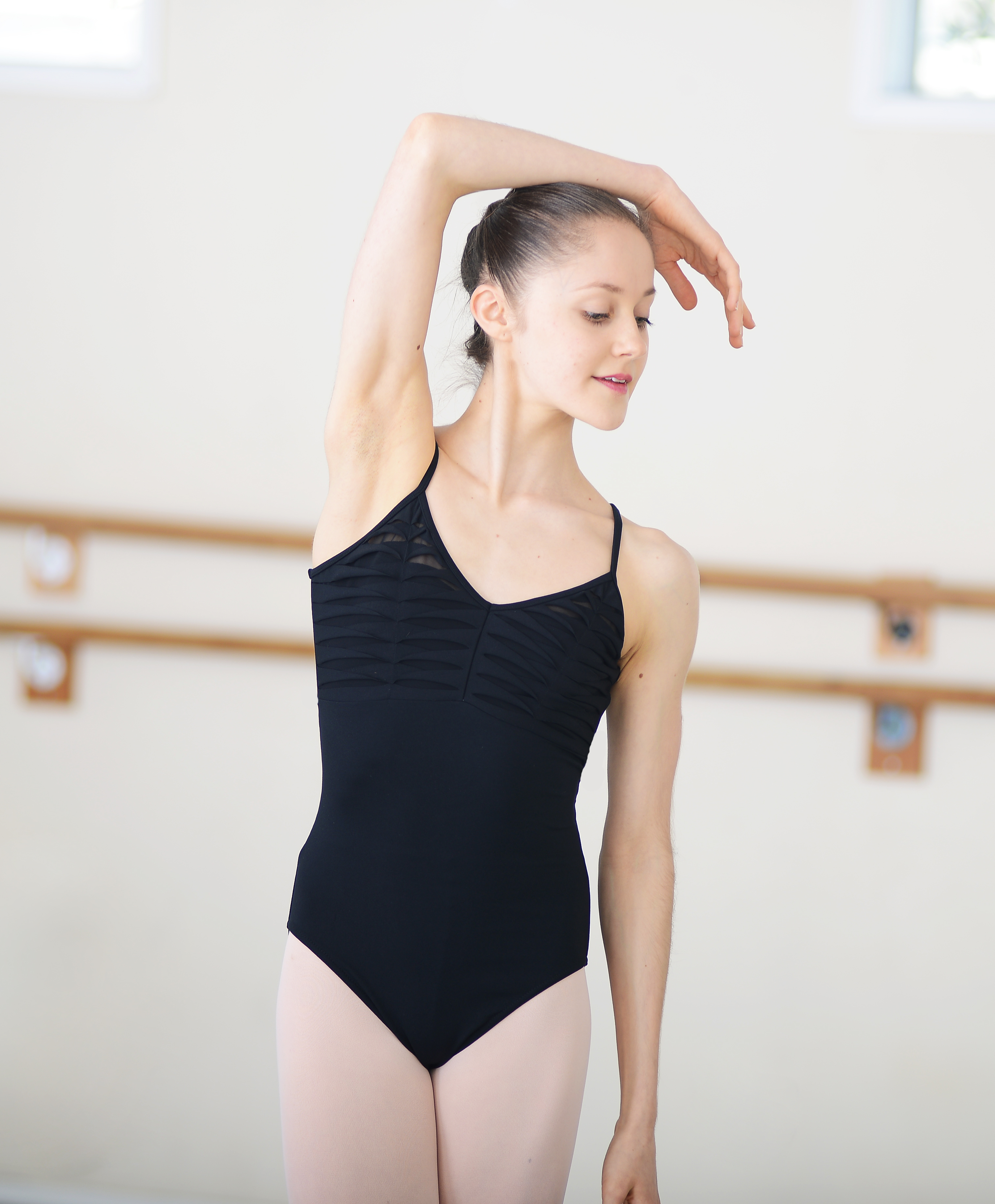
A ballet dancer in a black leotard and ballet pink tights

Leotards are used for a variety of purposes, including yoga, exercise, dance (particularly for ballet and modern), as pajamas, for additional layered warmth under clothing, and recreational and casual wear. They may form a part of children's dressing-up and play outfits and can also be worn as a top.

Leotards are commonly worn in figure skating, postwar modern dance, acrobatic rock'n'roll, traditional ballet and gymnastics, especially by young children. Practice leotards and those worn in podium training sessions are usually sleeveless. Female competition garments for gymnastics and skating are almost always long-sleeved. In contrast, male competition leotards may be sleeved or sleeveless, the latter more common in gymnastics, the former in figure skating. Leotards come in many styles—either with a full seated bottom or as a thong or T-front thong for maximum comfort and avoidance of visible panty lines when worn under leggings or tights.

== History ==
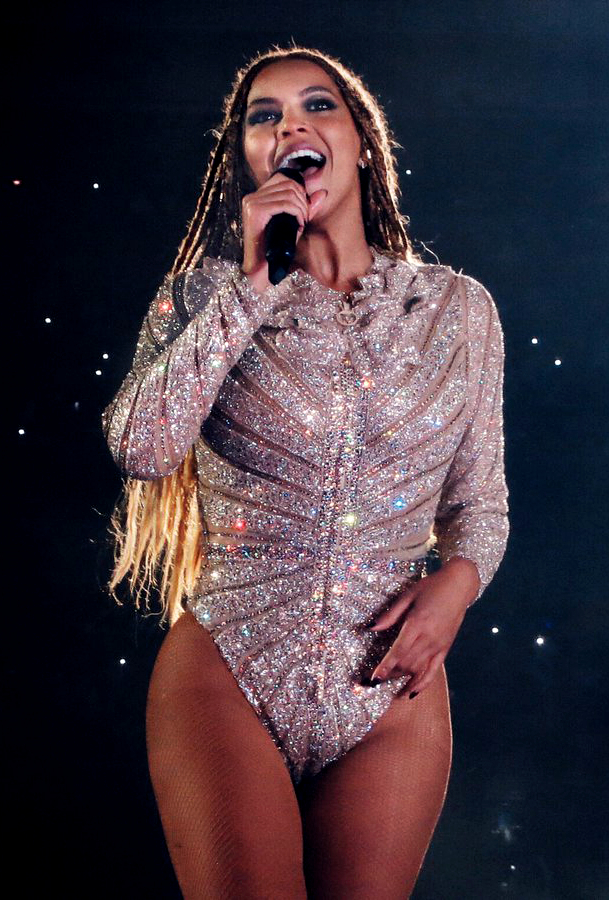
Singer Beyoncé wears a sparkly leotard with fishnet tights during her performance in London, July 2016.

The first known use of the name leotard came only in 1886, 16 years after Jules Léotard's death. Léotard called the garment a maillot, a general French word for different types of tight-fitting shirts or sports shirts. In the early 20th century, leotards were mainly confined to circus and acrobatics shows, worn by the specialists who performed these acts.

Leotards influenced the style of swimsuit in the 1920s and 1930s, and women's one-piece swimsuits today still resemble leotards in appearance.

Leotards are worn by professional dancers such as the showgirls of Broadway. Stage use of the leotard typically coordinates the garment with stockings or tights.

In the 1950s, traditionally-styled leotards continued to be worn mainly by stage performers and circus actors, but leotards began to be used as simple and functional exercise garments, often in institutional settings like schools and fitness training. These were almost always black and worn together with thick tights. Between 1950 and 1970, leotards remained as such in appearance until a style change in the 1970s, with more colorful leotards appearing on the scene, most often in ballet and exercise.

Leotards were a staple in aerobic exercise attire during the 1970s and 1980s, but their popularity waned in the 1990s as they were largely replaced by Lycra pants, similar to those worn by cyclists. By the 2000s, they had given way to trousers and leggings, which offered a more modern and flexible alternative. Nevertheless, leotards continue to be worn by female cyclists and athletes in competitive events, where their functionality and comfort remain valued.

In the late 2010s, leotards began to be frequently worn by pop stars in their performances, such as Beyoncé, Little Mix, and Taylor Swift.

== Crossover to fashion activewear ==
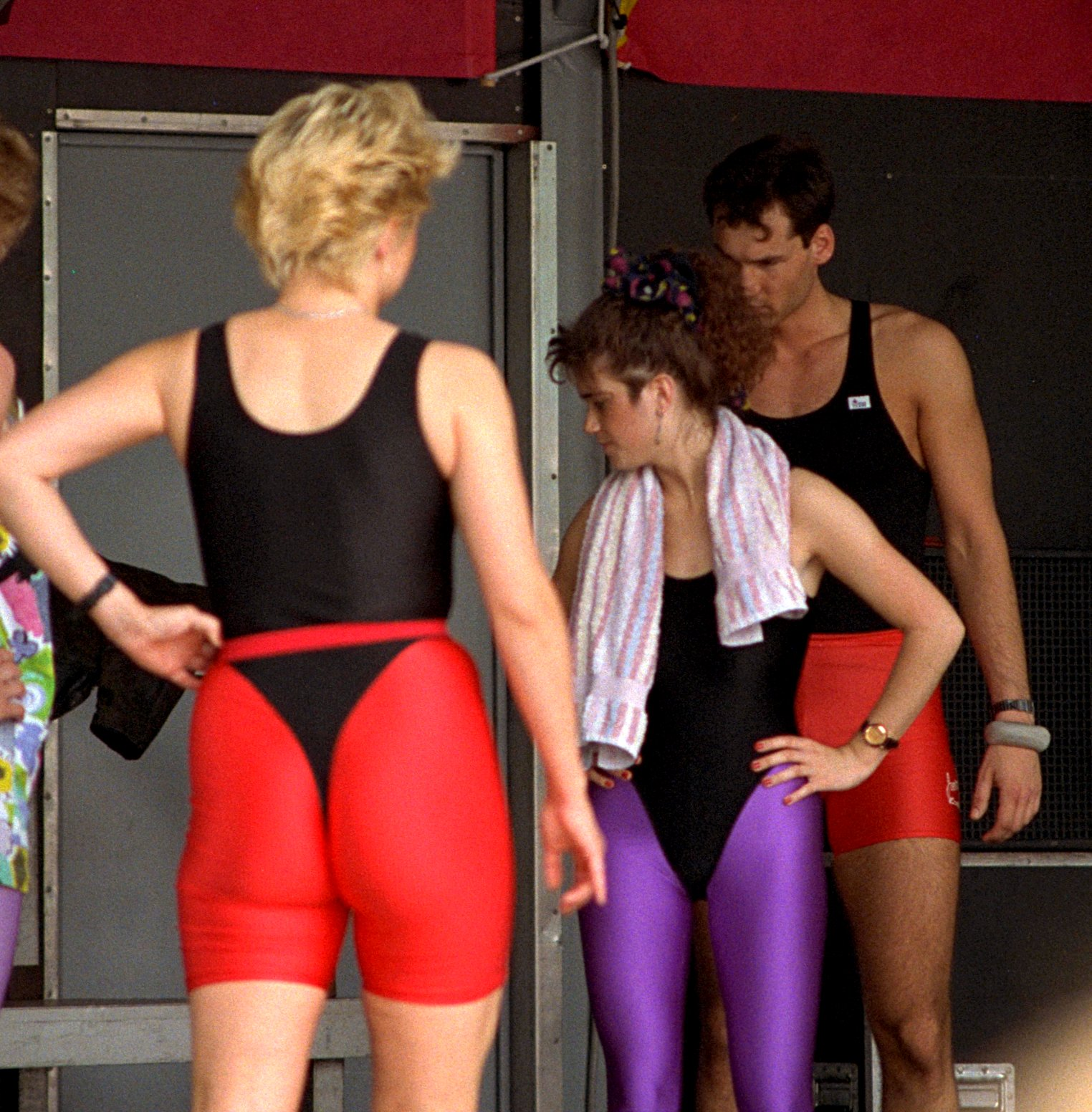
Typical aerobic exercise wear of the 1980s

By the late 1970s, leotards had become common both as exercise and streetwear, popularized by the disco craze, and aerobics fashion craze of the time. These leotards were produced in a variety of nylon and spandex materials, as well as the more traditional cotton previously used for uni-colored leotards and tights. Exercise videos by celebrities such as Jane Fonda also popularized the garment. The dancewear company Danskin flourished during this period, producing various leotards for both dance and streetwear. Other companies, such as Gilda Marx, produced leotards during this period and then ceased production when they ceased to be in fashion. By the late 1980s, leotards for exercise wear had become little more than bikini bottoms with straps over the shoulders, generally worn with cropped shirts. From the mid-1980s to mid 90s, leotards usually cap sleeved style or sometime in colder weather a long sleeved turtleneck style both popularly worn as tops with jeans especially skinny jeans and high waisted ankle length mom jeans, under shortalls or with casual or dress pants as part of everyday wear. They were also worn with skirts outfits. By the mid-1990s, leotards had been almost completely replaced for exercise wear by the sports bra and shorts.

== Gymnastics attire ==
=== Women ===
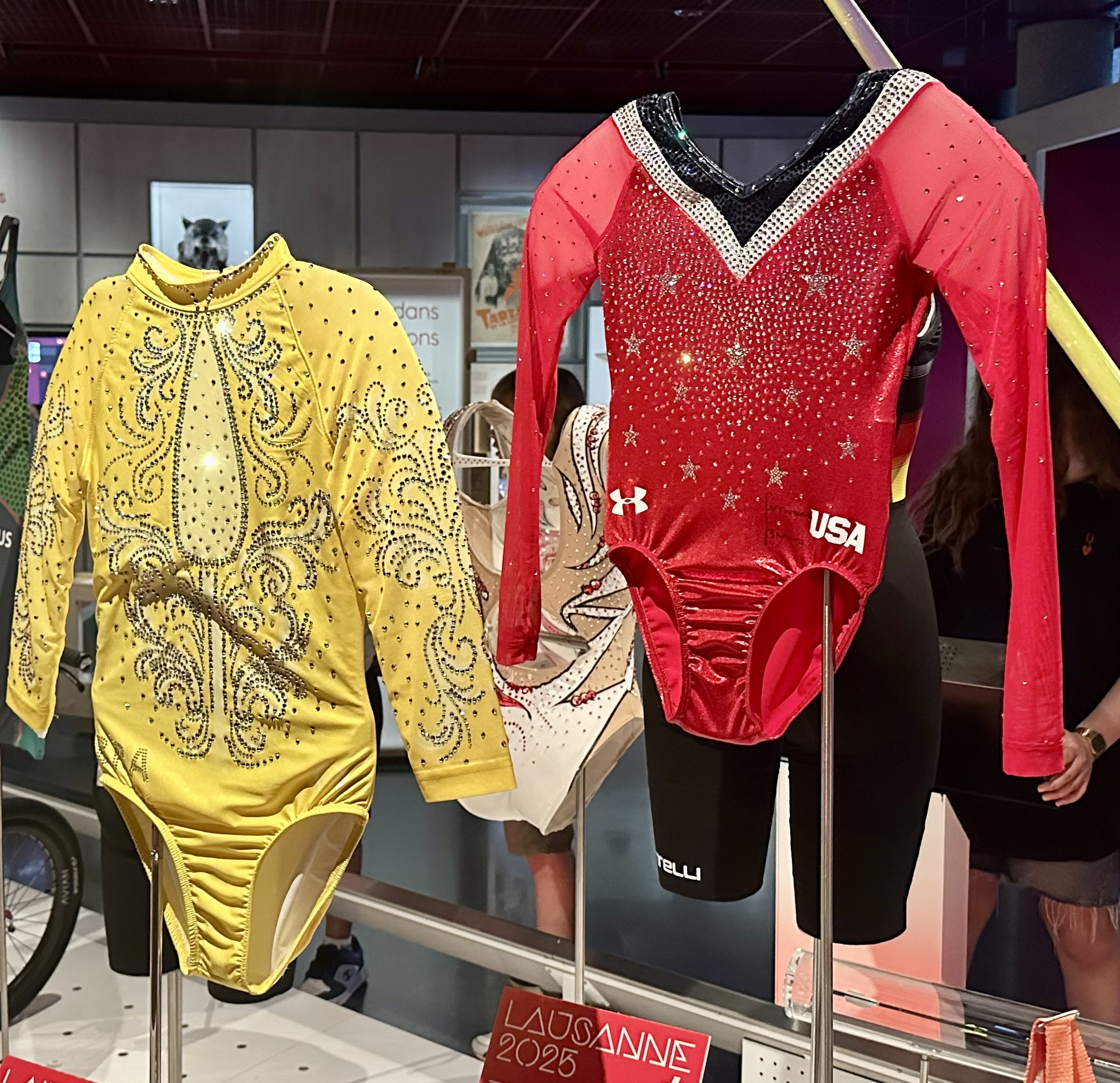
Leotards used by gymnasts Simone Biles and Rebeca Andrade at the Olympic Games on display at the Olympic Museum in Lausanne.

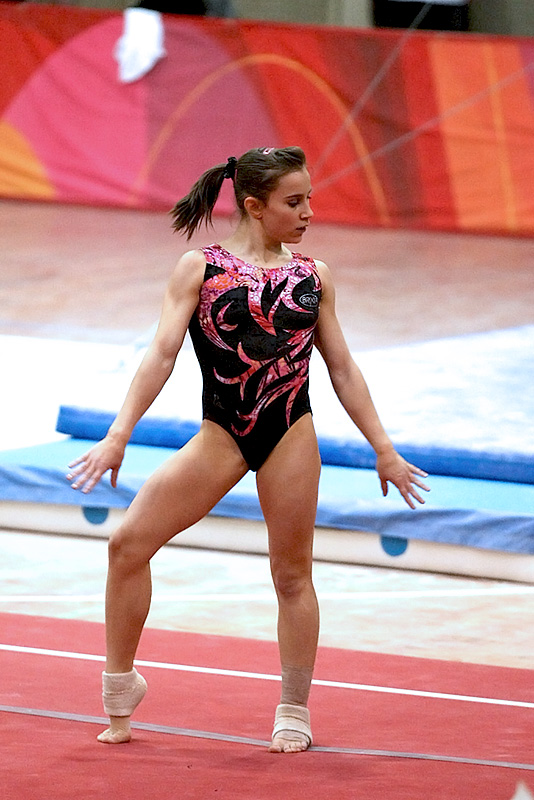
Gymnast Erika Fasana wearing a leotard, 2010

For women, the standard gymnastic competition uniform is a leotard. Traditionally, competition leotards have always had long sleeves; however, half-length sleeved and sleeveless garments are now permitted under the Code of Points and have been worn by teams at the Gymnastics World Championships and other significant events. Practice leotards and those worn in podium training sessions are generally sleeveless.

In the 1970s, leotards were typically made from polyester and related fabrics. Since the 1980s, however, they have been made from lycra or spandex. Since the 1990s, leotards have become more elaborate and have employed a variety of textiles, including velvet, velour, mesh, metallic fabrics, foils, and iridescent "hologram" fabric. They can also be decorated with rhinestones and metallic jewels that are heat-set onto the garments and will not fall or wash off.

Leotards that conform to regulations cannot be cut above hip height or past the shoulder blades, back, or front. Any somewhat see-through leotard is also against the rules. Usage of white tights is not standard. In rare instances, gymnasts and teams have been penalized with score deductions for their attire.

=== Men ===
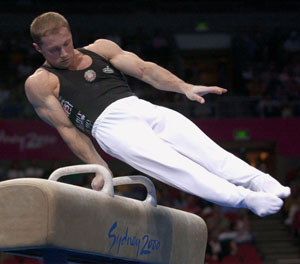
Ivan Ivankov wearing a male gymnastics uniform

For competitions, male gymnasts wear two layers of clothing. The first, a singlet or "comp" shirt (short for competition), is a sleeveless garment like a leotard. For floor and vault, gymnasts wear a pair of very short shorts over the singlet. For their other events, they wear a pair of long pants attached to the bottom of their feet with stirrups.

Unlike women's uniforms, which generally employ metallic or iridescent fabrics, men's uniforms are usually matte-colored and less ornate. Singlets usually employ one or more of the national team colors, but there are no restrictions on design. Shorts and pants are generally solid, typically white, blue, red, or black.

=== History ===
Olympic gymnastics team leotards have dramatically changed from their first memorable designs. Over time, the emphasis on what leotards are intended to do has changed. Originally, the intent was to cover as much of a woman's body as possible, while today, leotards must breathe, improve aerodynamics, and seamlessly re-shape as female athletes bend, twist, and contort their way through increasingly difficult routines.

== Men's leotards ==
When Léotard created the maillot, it was intended for men. This style of leotard can be seen in early 20th-century photos of the circus strongman. Men's leotards evolved along with the women's style, eventually resembling it, except that the men's version had a slightly lower-cut leg opening and a lower-cut front.

Unlike their female counterparts, however, men's leotards come in two styles—with a full seated bottom or as a thong. The reason for this is apparent when worn with tights, such as in ballet, where lines created by the garment underneath the tights may be considered unsightly. A dance belt is also worn in such instances.

Leotards are commonly worn by male dancers (particularly for ballet) and gymnasts. Leotard-like garments (often of the "biketard" or singlet type) are also often worn by men in sports such as rowing, wrestling, cycling, and running to maintain a tight fit and prevent the upper part of the clothing from running up.

During the Dangerous World Tour, American superstar Michael Jackson wore a gold leotard.

== See also ==
- Athleisure
- Bodystocking
- Bodysuit
- Catsuit
- Jumpsuit
- Spandex
- Sportswear
- Underwear as outerwear
- Women's uniform controversies at the 2020 Summer Olympics
- Wrestling singlet
