= List of BDSM equipment =

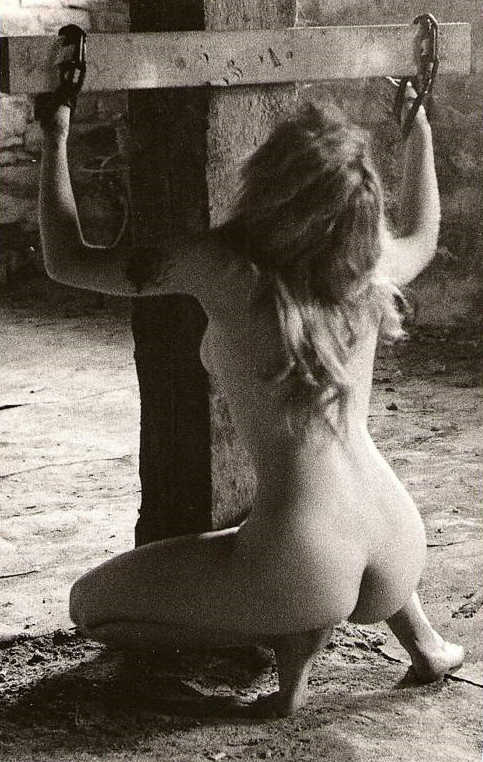
A kneeling woman chained naked to a wooden plank to expose her body, breasts and genitals.

This is a list of BDSM equipment:

== Restraints ==
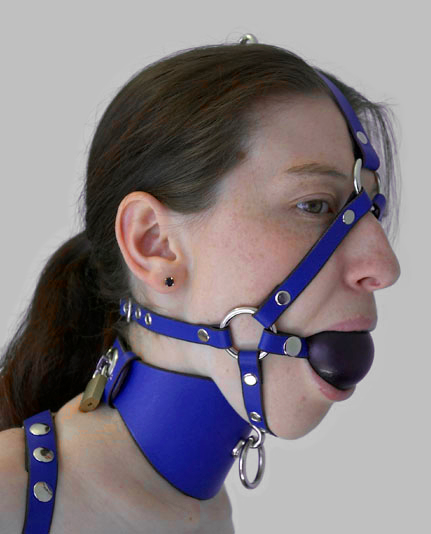
Woman wearing a head harness with a ball gag and posture collar to position and keep her head still.

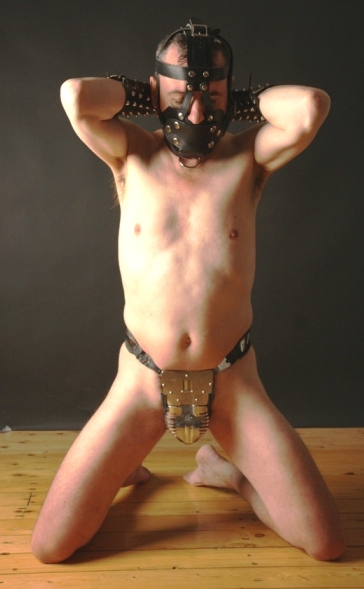
A male slave wearing a Carrara chastity device, muzzle gag and gloves.

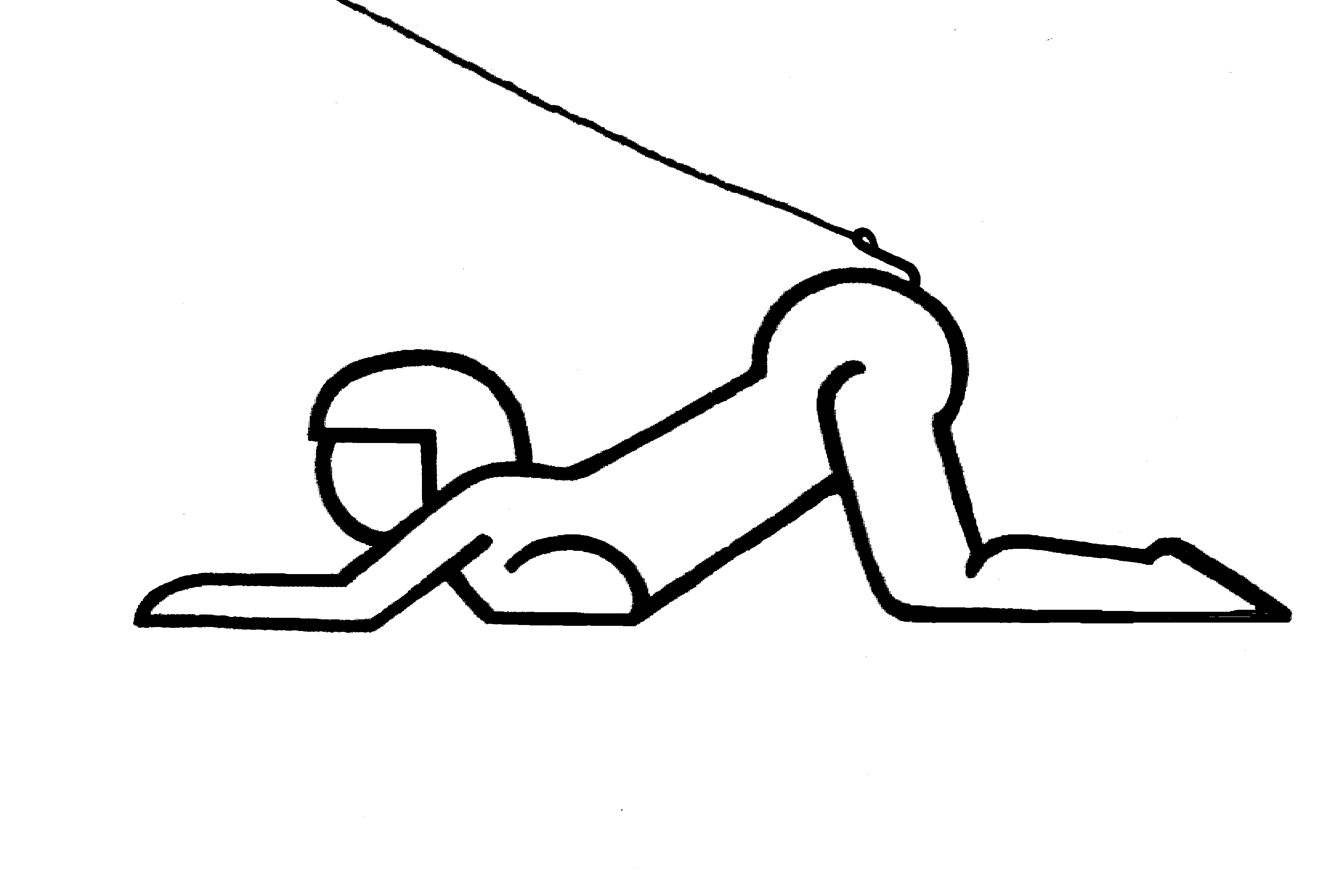
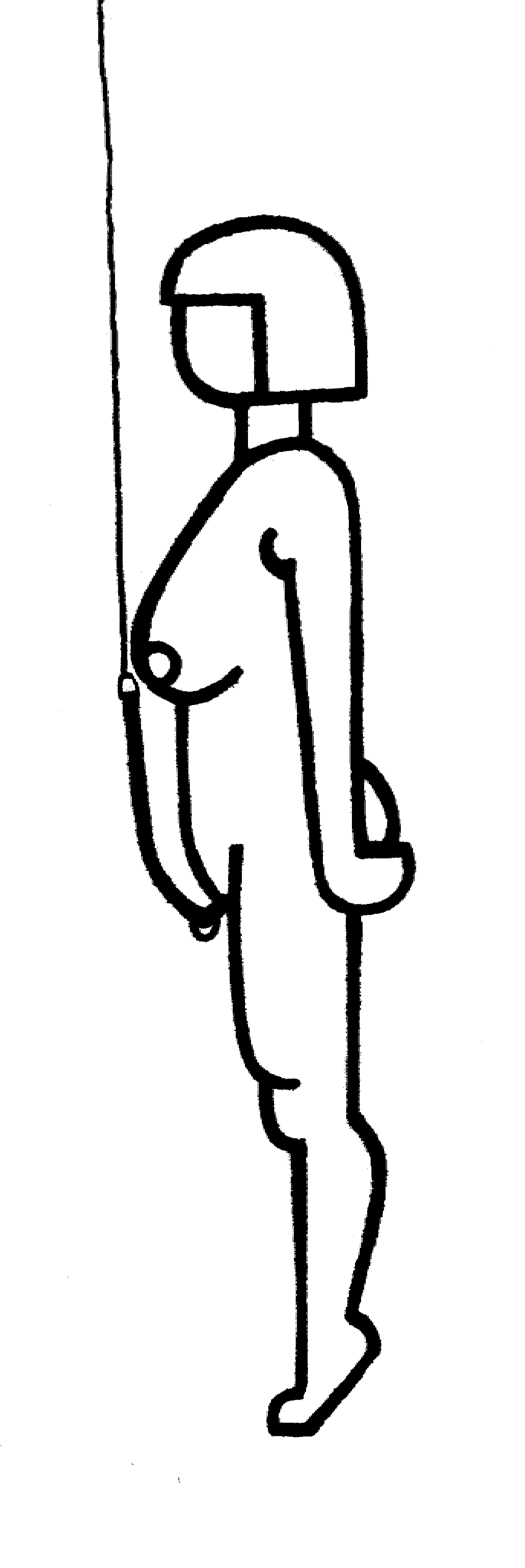
Anal hook (left), Pussy or vaginal hook (right)
- Armbinder, Monoglove
- Bondage cuffs
- Bondage mittens
- Bondage harness
- Bondage belt
- Bondage tape
- Bondage yoke - a yoke for BDSM play
- Chain
- Cohesive bandage
- Collar
- Diapers
- Elbow harness

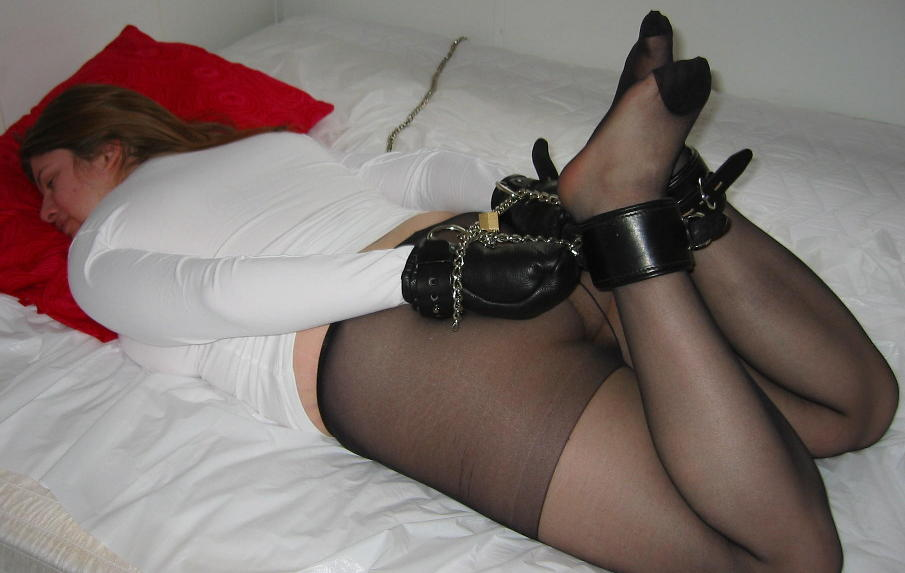
Woman hogtied using bondage mittens and bondage cuffs

- Head harness
- Hobble skirt
- Human pony harness
- Leash
- Medical restraints
- Mouth gag: Funnel gag, Dental gag, Ring gag, Mouthguard gag, Inflatable gag, Bit gag, Ball gag, Muzzle gag, Penis gag
- Nose hook
- Padlock
- Plastic wrap
- Posture collar
- Rope
- Shackles
- Sleepsacks
- Speculum
- Spreader bar
- Straitjackets

== Bondage furniture ==
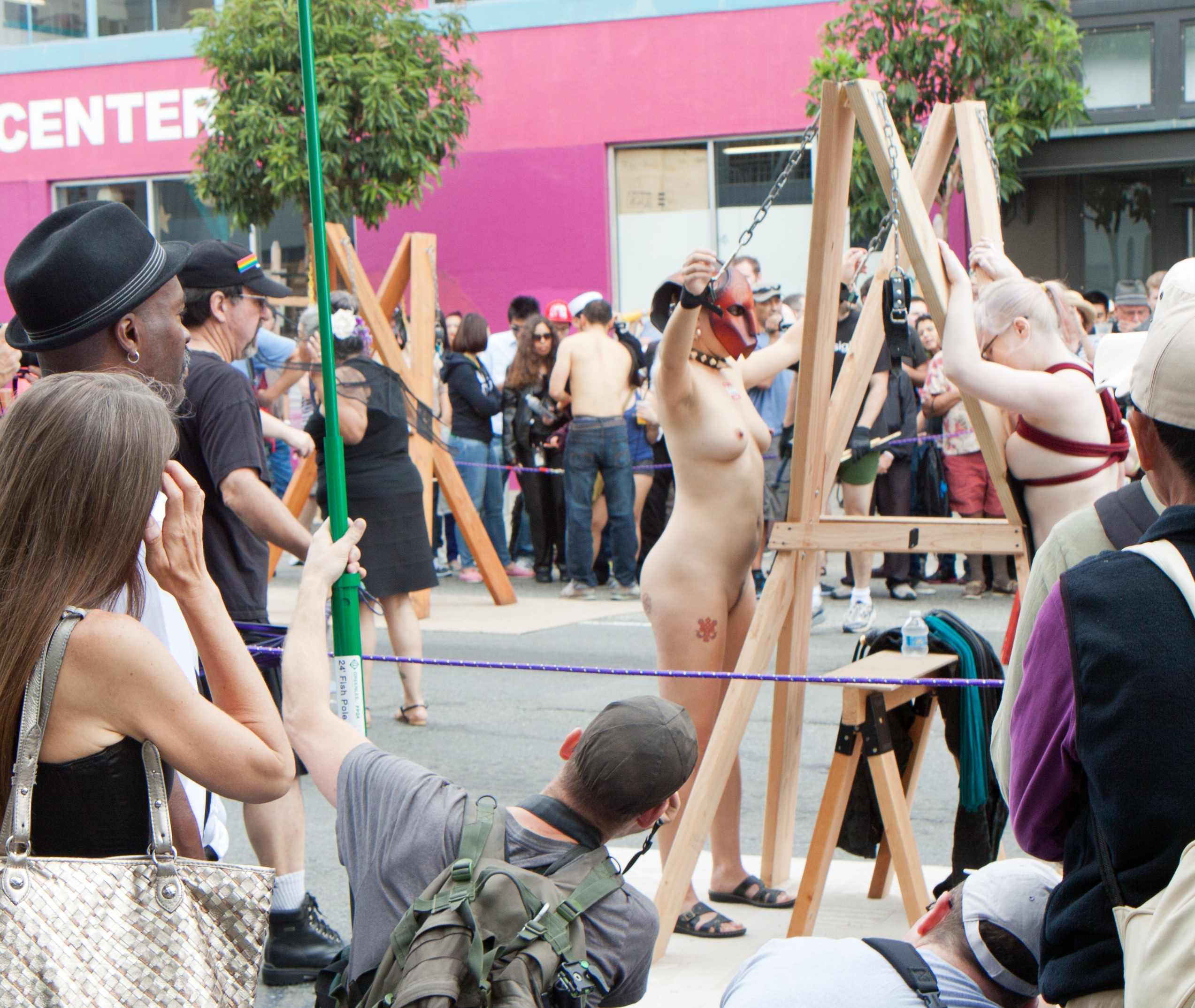
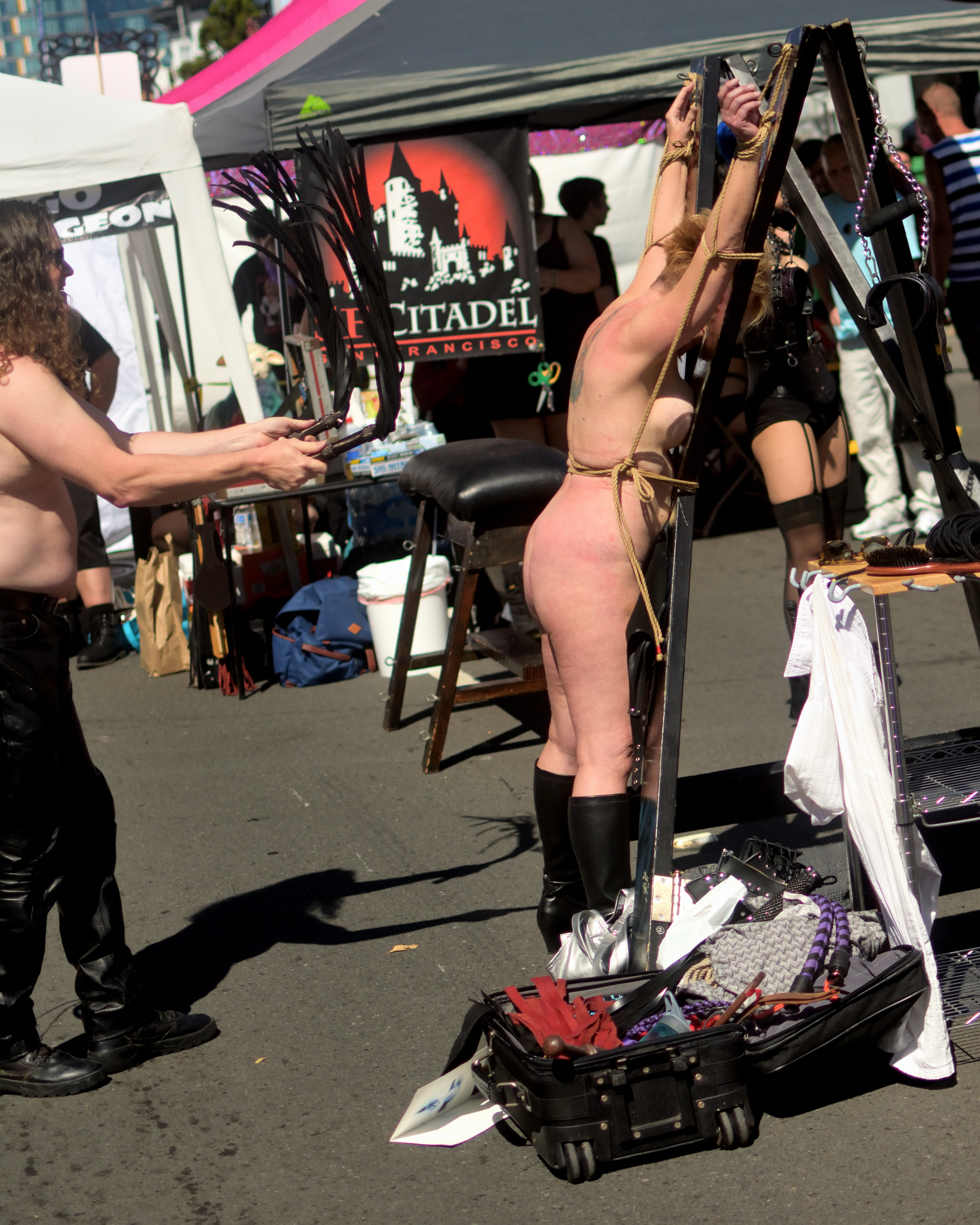
BDSM in public: nude women fastened to X-crosses and flogged at Folsom Street Fair, San Francisco

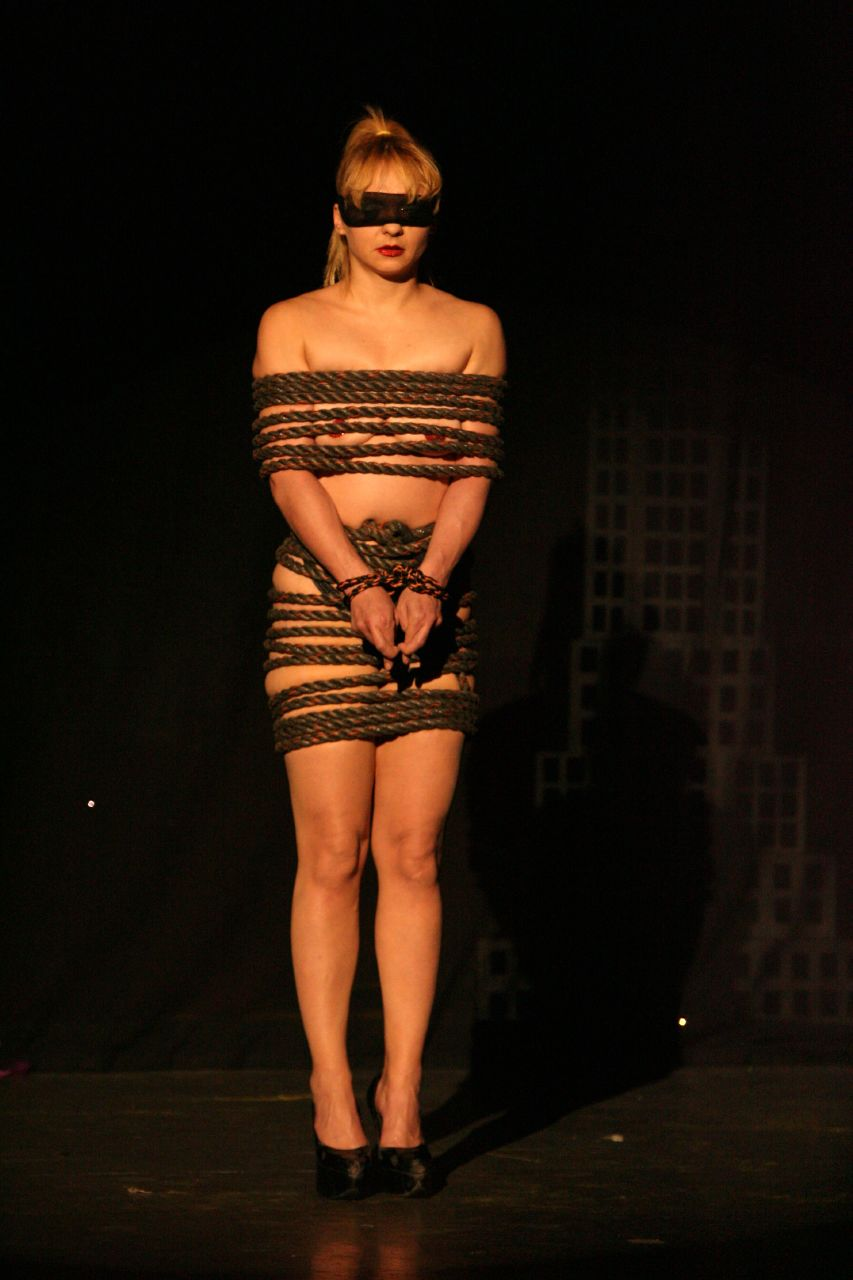
Burlesque Act inspired by Prisoner handcuff binding: Nude woman's arms and wrists tied with rope at Miss Exotic World event, 2007.

- A-frame
- Ankle/wrist stocks
- Berkley Horse
- Bondage bed
- Bondage bench
- Bondage chair
- Bondage frame
- Bondage stool
- Bondage table
- Bondage wheel
- Box stocks
- Fisting slings and swings
- Genital stocks
- Grope box
- Gynaecological chair
- Gynaecological table
- Hoist
- Inversion table
- Queening stool
- Rack
- Sawhorse
- Seated cross
- Smotherbox
- Spanking horse
- Stocks and pillories
- Whipping bench
- Wooden horse
- X-cross

== Genital and sexual-play ==
- Anal hook
- Ball stretcher
- Cock ring
- Chastity device
- Enema equipment
- Humbler
- Penis plug
- Pussy or vaginal hook
- Parachute
- Urethral sound

== Sensory deprivation ==
- Blindfolds
- Bondage hoods
- Gas masks
- Vacuum beds

== Physical stimulation ==
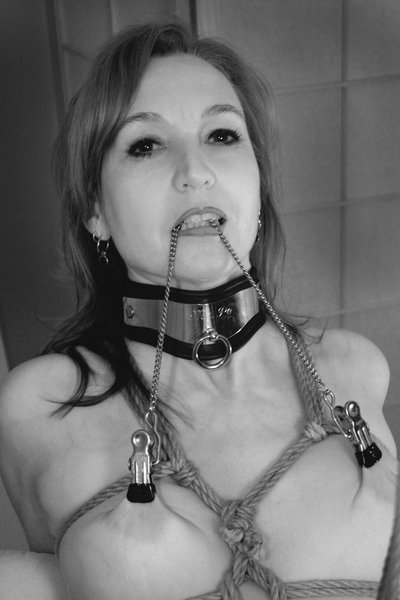
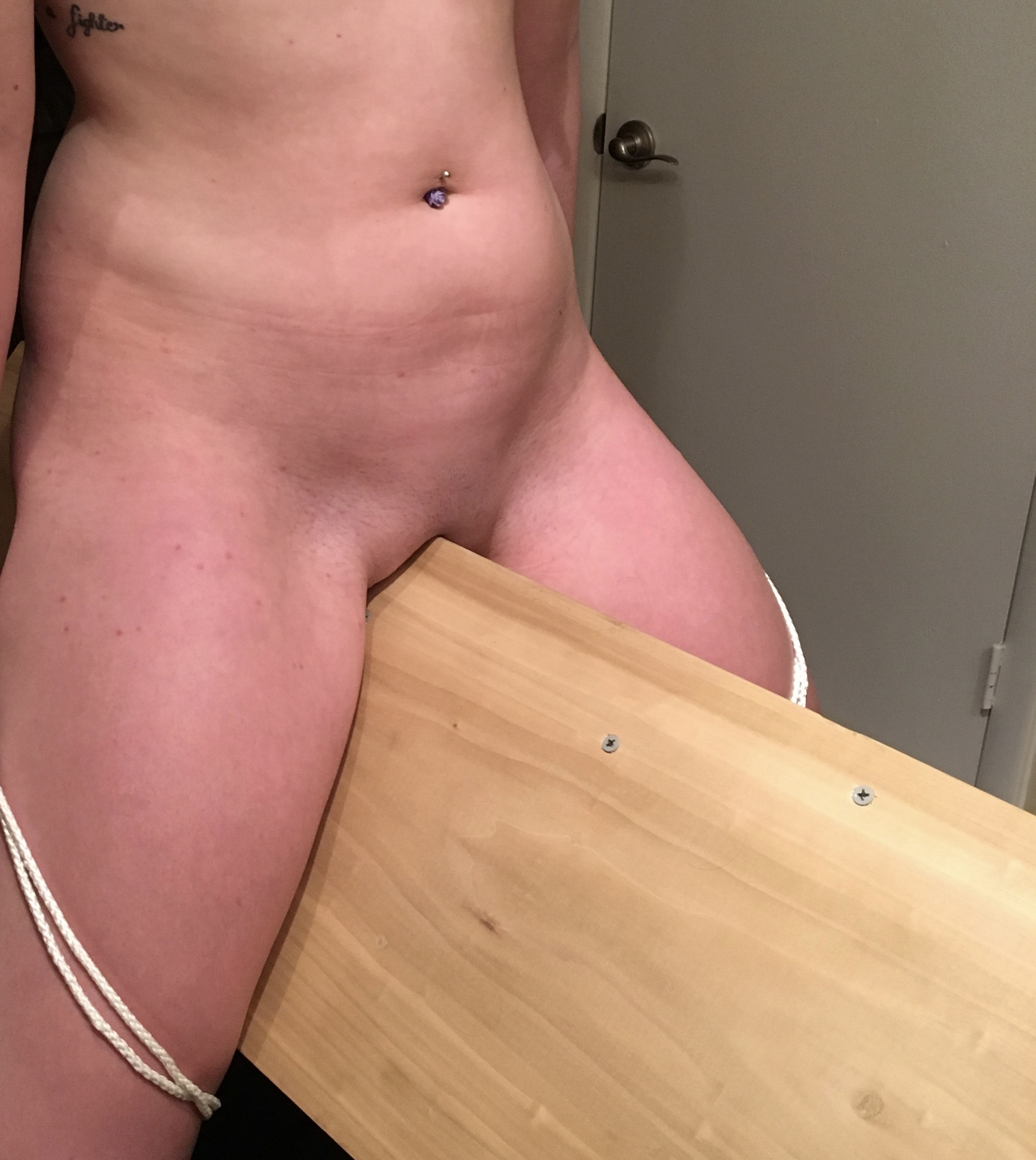
Left: Nipple clamps with attached chain (the chain is being pulled for added pain). Right: Pussy torture by wooden horse
- Breast press
- Butt plugs
- Cane (synthetic fiber or natural fiber)
- Floggers
- Nipple clamps
- Riding crop
- Spanking paddles
- Spanking belt
- Titty twister
- Vampire gloves
- Wartenberg Wheel
- Whip
- Wooden pony

== Sexual stimulation ==
- Erotic electrostimulation apparatus
- Strap-on dildo
- Sybian
- Vibrator
- Violet wand
- Sex machine

== See also ==
- Bondage positions and methods
- Outline of BDSM
- Sex toy
