= Total enclosure fetishism =

Form of sexual fetishism

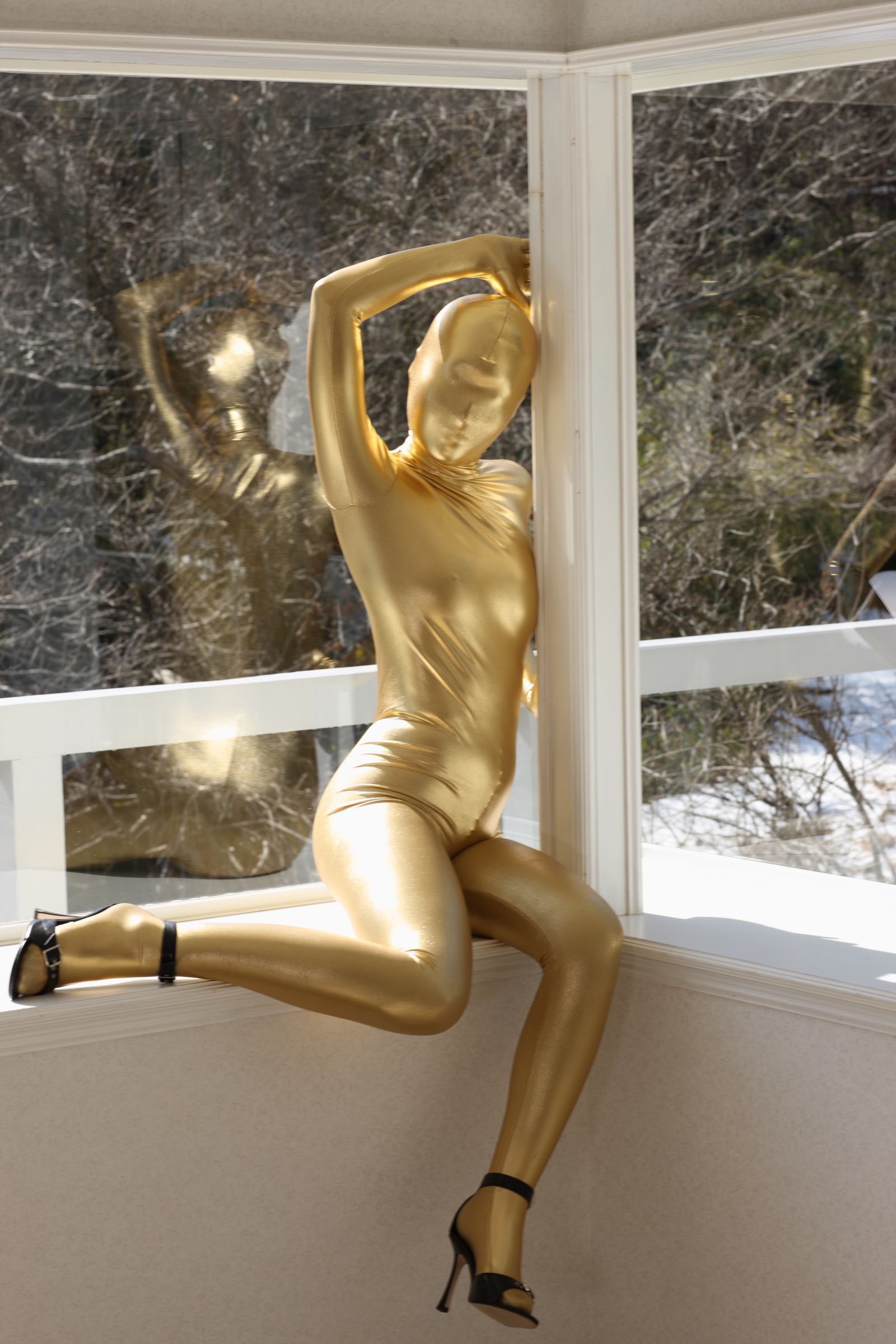
Total enclosure zentai suit

Total enclosure fetishism is a form of sexual fetishism whereby a person becomes aroused when having their entire body enclosed in a certain way. Total enclosure is often accompanied by some element of bondage.

== Examples ==
Some total enclosure activities include:

- In rubber fetishism, rubber suits, gas masks, a bondage suit, and similar garments and accessories are used for total enclosure.
- Vacuum beds rigidly enclose the entire body under a rubber sheet with a small breathing tube.
- Sleepsacks and body bags are also used as less rigid enclosure alternative to the vacuum beds, although some are made in inflatable form to increase pressure on the occupant's body.
- In spandex fetishism, zentai suits (often called 'bodystockings' when made from sheer nylon similar to pantyhose) are used for total enclosure in skintight fabric from head to toe In the case of zentai, the wearer breathes through the loose-woven fabric itself, the garment is not as tight as a rubber or PVC garment would be, and the costume generally comes off with a zipper that can be operated by the wearer.
- Being sealed within a giant stuffed animal or murrsuit (sexual fursuit).

Although experiences of these activities are regarded as claustrophobic, total enclosure fetishists like to practice these activities, sometimes combining them with bondage to intensify feelings of helplessness.

== Risks ==
As with all activities involving bondage or potential risk to breathing, this is a risky activity. Maintaining an airway, preventing positional asphyxia, and ensuring that the enclosed person has a means of escape at all times are of paramount importance, if these activities are not to result in death.

See the articles on bondage and erotic asphyxiation for some discussion of the risks involved.

== See also ==
- Bondage (BDSM)
- Bondage hood
- Bondage suit
- BDSM
- Endosomaphilia
- Human furniture
- Partialism
- Mummification (BDSM)

== Sources ==
- Gillian Freeman, "The Undergrowth of Literature", Nelson, 1967, pp. 141–143
- David Kunzle, "Fashion and fetishism: a social history of the corset, tight-lacing, and other forms of body-sculpture in the West", Rowman and Littlefield, 1982, ISBN 0-8476-6276-4, p. 39
- Simon LeVay, Sharon McBride Valente, "Human sexuality", Sinauer Associates, 2006, ISBN 0-87893-465-0, p. 494
