= Bondage suit =

Garment associated with BDSM activities

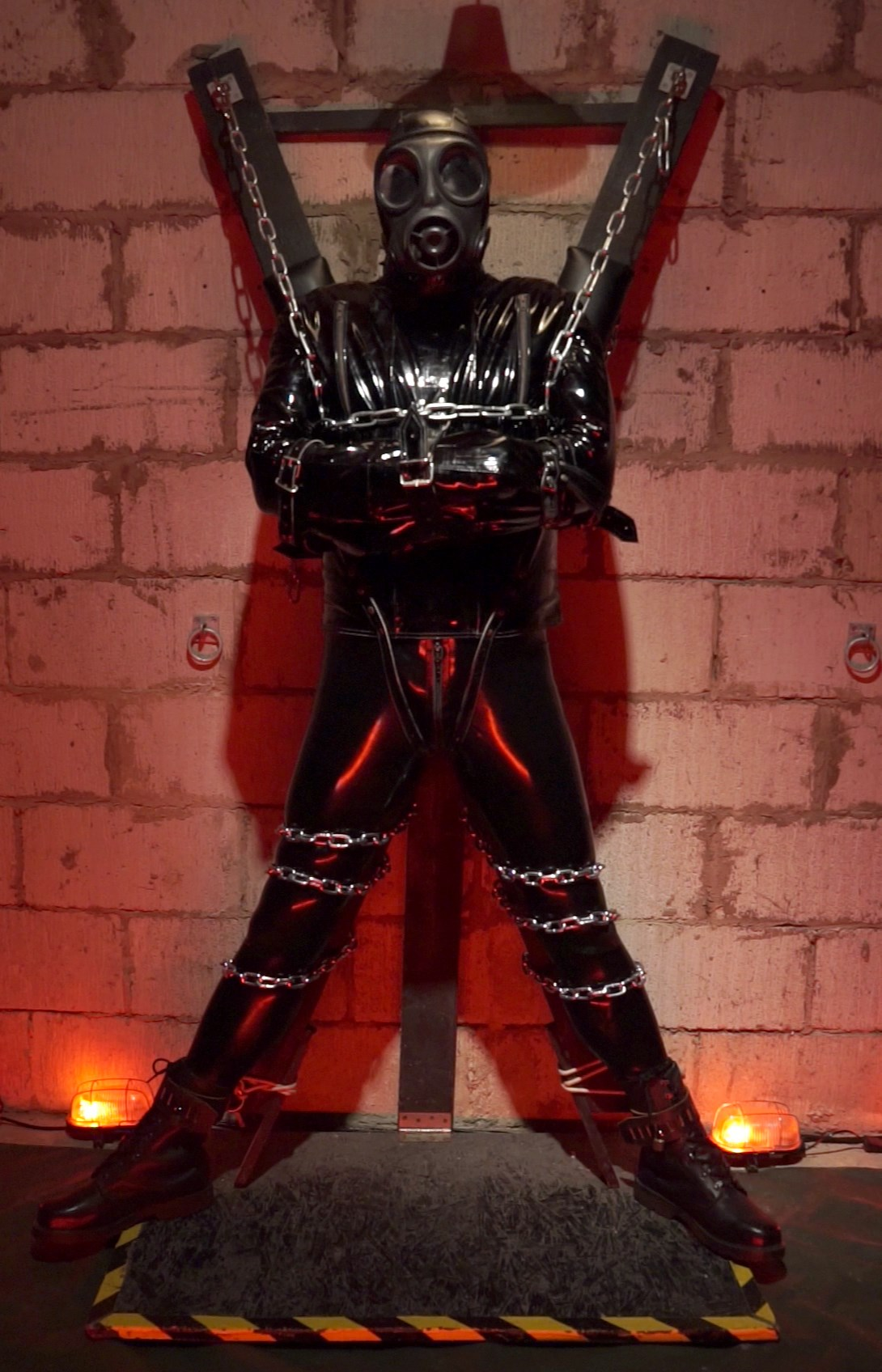
A person in a black PVC jacket

A bondage suit, also called a gimp suit, is a form-fitting garment designed to completely cover the wearer's body, and often include straps or other fasteners designed to restrict the wearer's movement, sometimes completely immobilizing them. They are often made from leather, latex, spandex, or other materials that can be made form-fitting, and are usually heavy and difficult to move in. They are often worn in conjunction with a mask, hood, blindfold, or other items intended to further restrict the wearer's senses, as well as corsets, bondage harnesses, handcuffs, and other movement-restricting items.

== Use ==
Bondage suits are sometimes used in BDSM foreplay to objectify the wearer, or fetishize. The wearer, often called a gimp, often voluntarily gives up their autonomy while wearing the suit, and might take on the role of a sexual toy, doll, dummy, or automaton. In other cases, the suit is worn solely for aesthetic or tactile purpose. Some bondage suits have conveniently placed openings to allow the breasts, genitals, mouth, anus, or other sensitive parts of the wearer's body to be directly accessible to the other partner.

== In popular culture ==
Such suits are sometimes called a gimp suit, a term popularized by its use in Quentin Tarantino's 1994 movie Pulp Fiction.

== See also ==
- Agalmatophilia
- ASFR
- BDSM
- Bondage hood
- Doll fetish
- Foreplay
- Role-playing
- Sexual roleplay
- Total Enclosure Fetishism
