= Sleepsack =

Sleepsack or sleep sack can refer to:

- An infant sleeping bag, a bag-like garment or covering worn by infants for sleeping
- Sleepsack (BDSM), a type of bondage gear
