= Weld purging =

Removing contaminants from vicinity of welding joint

Weld purging is the act of removing, from the vicinity of the joint; oxygen, water vapour and any other gases or vapours that might oxidize or contaminate a welding joint as it is being welded and immediately after welding.

Stainless steels, duplex steels, titanium-, nickel- and zirconium- alloys are sensitive to the presence of air, oxygen, hydrogen, water vapour and other vapours and gases that may combine with the hot metal as it is being joined.

Such gases may combine with the metal to form undesirable compounds that may reduce corrosion resistance or may be instrumental in creating cracks or other structural defects in metals.

Weld Purging is generally necessary for the first weld run when joining two separate parts. This sealing weld will be called a “root run” when it takes more than one run or (pass) to fully seal the root area from above.

Once the root run has been completed, it is possible to stop the purging process unless the welding engineer has specified that purging should be continued for the second and third passes for example in case the root weld becomes hot enough to oxidise in the air that will have replaced the purge gas.

== Purging methods ==
Unwanted gas is generally removed by flushing with an inert gas. Argon is generally used for this purpose but helium is an alternative depending on gas cost and availability.

Nitrogen has been used as a purge gas but is unsuitable for some stainless steels.

The most common way to remove gas from the weld zone is to flush it away with an inert gas. The weld zone can be contained to prevent fresh gas from entering once the contained volume has been purged.

Another method of purging is to enclose the metal parts completely in a vacuum chamber and evacuate it, prior to backfilling with inert gas for the welding process. When purging with inert gases, it is important to add the inert gas very slowly.

When using Argon, which is heavier than air, the gas should enter from the bottom of the enclosed space. After filling the base area, be it the bottom of a pipe or tank, it will continue to displace air, which rises upwards. The displaced air is purged out of a release hole at the top. If process monitoring is desired, an oxygen sensor can be used - ideally placed near the release hole, to ensure the weld container is appropriately purged.

Helium however, which is a lighter-than-air inert gas, should be added from the top of the enclosed space, where it will first flood across the upper limits and push the trapped air downwards and out through an exit where the oxygen level can be measured until it reaches the required level. The purpose of slow gas entry, typically 5 – 7 litres/m (….CFH), is to avoid turbulence, which would otherwise lengthen the resettlement-by-weight and purge process considerably.

== Welding methods ==
Most weld purging is carried out on joints made by the TIG or GTAW arc welding process. When the laser welding process is chosen, joints or welds being made on reactive materials will need to be carried out and in the case of electron beam welding, this is carried out in a vacuum, in which case purging takes place by complete evacuation of all gas.

For TIG/GTAW welding, the top side (front side) of a weld is normally protected by inert gas flowing through the welding torch and it is the underside (back side) of the weld where atmospheric gases need to be purged.

When joining two parts together with a seal weld, it may be necessary to first hold them together, by making tack welds. This will be carried out by making very short welds at intervals varying according to the size and weight of the two parts. It is very important that the weld purging process should start for the tack welds, so the undersides of those tacks remain clean and shiny, without any oxidation or discolouration.

== Gases ==
Unwanted gas is generally removed by flushing with an inert gas. Argon is the most commonly used inert gas due to its universal applicability, inertness and availability. It is suitable for a variety of materials, including unalloyed and alloyed steels, stainless steel and aluminum.

Helium, on the other hand, offers high thermal conductivity and improved penetration, making it advantageous for specific applications, particularly when welding thin or thick materials. However, helium is more expensive than argon and is often used in combination with other gases, depending on the requirements of the welding process.

Nitrogen has been employed as a purge gas, particularly in nitrogen-hydrogen mixtures, which are specifically effective for forming environments in austenitic chromium-nickel steels and duplex steels. However, pure nitrogen is unsuitable for certain stainless steels due to potential adverse effects on the mechanical properties of the weld.

Purge gases must be of a certain quality, typically with a purity of 99.99% or higher, to ensure proper weld formation. Welds conducted in argon or helium atmospheres with more than 0.05% (500ppm) of oxygen content risk oxidation and discoloration, compromising the structural integrity and corrosion resistance of the weld. Consequently, welding engineers include specific gas quality requirements in their welding procedures.

If process monitoring is desired, an oxygen sensor can be used to confirm the purge gas has appropriately filled the region of interest prior to starting the weld. This ensures a consistent inert atmosphere, minimizing the risk of oxidation during the welding process.

== Measurement of purge quality ==
There are charts available that show the discolouration of some metals, caused by the presence of oxygen, even at concentrations below 50 parts per million. It is possible to monitor oxygen levels by an instrument known as an oxygen sensor. Many specific brands of oxygen sensor are available, with varying sensitivity, time of response, and other criteria of interest. 1 part per million sensitivity is more than sufficient for almost all welding purposes.

Some of these instruments are hand held and powered by battery for ease of use around construction sites where the materials mentioned are being welded and others are powered by mains electricity due to the power requirements needed to run switching operations, collect data and operate internal pumps to draw the purge gas over the sensor for measurement.

== Accessories ==
To carry out weld purging, there are many proprietary accessories available to suit all kinds of weld joints.

== Tube and pipe welds with open ended access ==
Inflatable pipe purging systems are the most commonly used, where two inflatable bags (known as dams) are connected by an inert gas tube about 20” (500 mm) in length with one dam placed either side of the weld.

The space between the dams is filled with inert gas that flushes out the air. The residual oxygen is measured by a weld purge monitor until it reaches the desired level for welding to begin.

== Closing tube and pipe welds ==
In some cases it is not possible to retrieve reusable pipe purging systems so a water-soluble film is the best alternative. Film dams can be placed either side of a weld and held in place with a strong water-soluble adhesive. Water-soluble dams are transparent, allowing welders and quality control engineers to view and check the weld from the underside while it is in progress. After welding, the Dams are simply washed away during water cleaning or hydrostatic leak testing of joints.

== Sheet metal joints ==
Sheet metal joints might be made on a seam welding machine where weld purging is carried out automatically as part of the machine design.

Where sheet metal is formed into tanks or vessels prior to welding, the inside of the vessel can be purged with a flow of inert gas, however for larger sizes the cost of the gas and the time taken is unrealistic. In such cases, a weld backing tape can be used. This is a layer of glass fibre band in the centre of a width of adhesive aluminium foil that is placed over the rear of the weld joint.

Welds made onto weld backing tape can be carried out faster than normal and the weld bead is cast flat onto the glass fibre leaving an acceptable weld profile behind. This method may leave some discolouration to be cleaned, but dramatically reduces the amount of coking and oxidation that would otherwise take place.

== Trailing shields ==
To improve weld purging on the front side of welds, a trailing shield can be attached to manual or automatic welding torches to follow behind as the weld is being made. In this way, the weld is kept under an inert gas shield for longer than normal, giving an improved weld quality, while allowing the welder to weld faster.

Trailing shields are also supplied to hold against the back side of welds, whether flat or radiused, in order to keep the joint free from oxidation and discolouration.

When welding with metals such as Titanium, a secondary inert shielding gas application is necessary to protect the cooling weld bead and heat-affected zone. Trailing cups prevent oxidation by shielding the weld from the atmosphere until it has cooled to a safe temperature.

== Chambers ==
When separate components need to be welded in an inert atmosphere, they can be placed inside a Weld Purging Chamber that is flushed out completely with inert gas.

Welding chambers are mostly built to order, however standard low cost Flexible Welding Enclosures are available, that enable individual or multiples of individual components to be welded in one weld purge cycle.

== Technicalities ==
Argon is heavier than air. When used as a purge gas, it should be slowly introduced into the bottom of the cavity and allowed to push the ambient gas out of the exhaust port. This method avoids the ambient gas and the purge gas mixing and which would lengthen the weld purge cycle considerably.

Helium is lighter than air and so has to be introduced at the top of the cavity with the exhaust at the bottom. For better results a weld purge monitor should be used rather than guessing whether the purge is satisfactory. One weld that has to be cut out and repaired, will always cost more than such an instrument.

== Cleanliness ==
To ensure an easy purge cycle and a good weld being made, cleanliness has to be considered as part of the weld preparation.

All surfaces adjacent to the weld and in a trapped space that is being purged, should be thoroughly cleaned with a permitted industrial cleaning fluid, dried and washed afterwards in demineralized water.

Welders and pipe fitters should try to ensure that the purge cavity is always free from oils, paper, moisture, cloth, foam, sponge etc. All such items will give off vapours continually during the weld cycle and could risk contamination of the weld joint and rejection or failure of the weld when in service.

Weld purging products suitable for this work should use specially selected materials for construction with lowest possible vapour pressures to avoid outgassing when the weld zone starts to become warm from welding.

As the weld warms the immediate vicinity inside the weld purge space, any materials exposed to the increasing temperature will start to outgas (give off gas).

Normally this extra gas should be removed by the continuing weld purge gas flow, however there are times when gas and vapours overwhelm the purge, oxygen levels rise and the weld becomes contaminated.

This should be spotted by the welder with his weld purging instrument.

Some oxygen sensing instruments have the ability to give an alarm signal or close down the welding operation, when there is an unwanted rise in oxygen level.

Purging can continue until the oxygen level is low enough once more and welding can begin again.

To avoid such situations, undesirable materials must be kept away from the weld zone.
