= Neck corset =

Type of BDSM collar

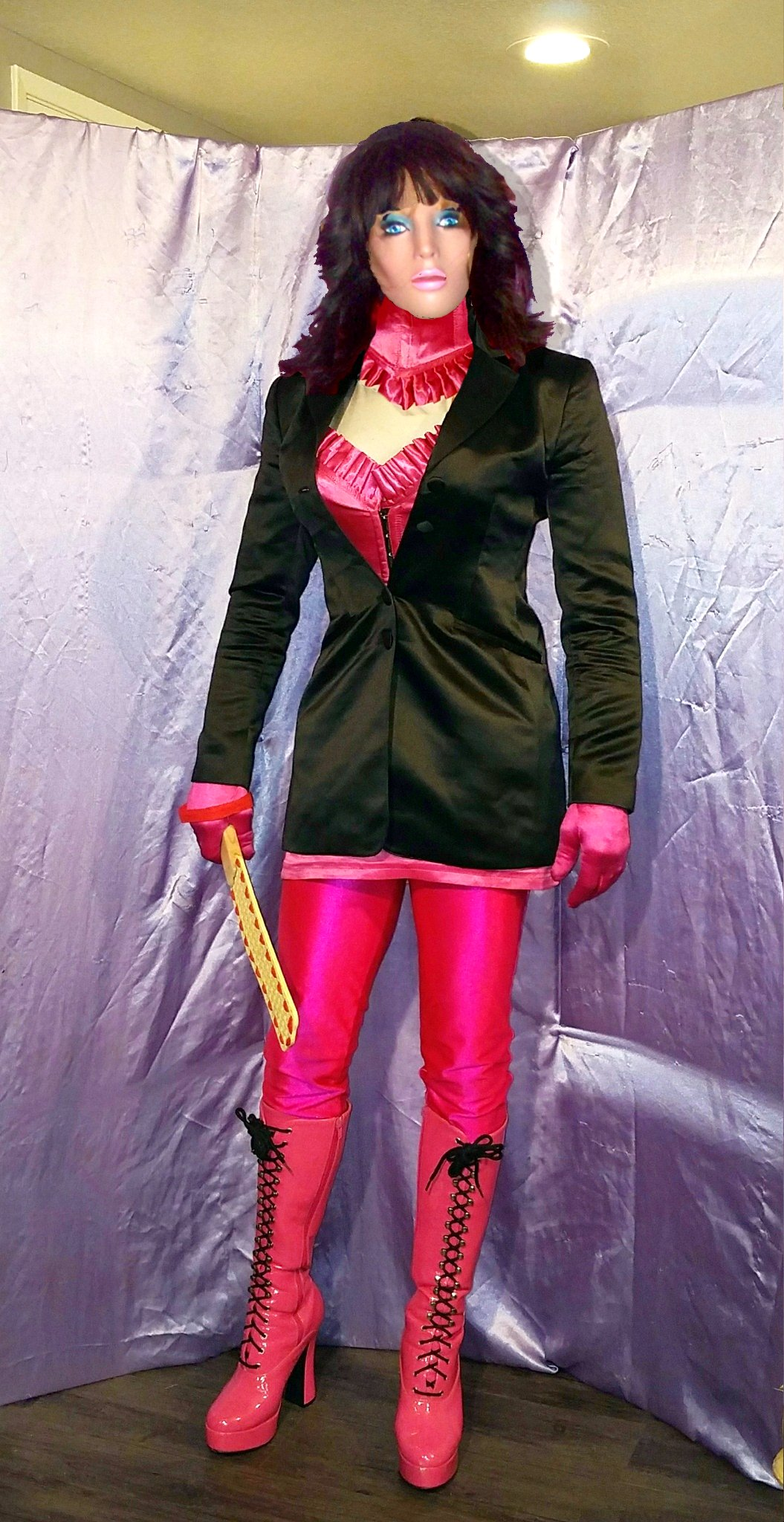
A person wearing a pink neck corset as part of their BDSM attire

A neck corset (sometimes called corset collar or neck lacer) is a type of BDSM collar. Unlike a normal corset which compresses the waist, a neck corset is usually not used to compress the neck, except in breathplay. It may act as a posture collar that incorporates stays.

Neck corsets may be worn in BDSM and goth subcultures, and may be worn in a decorative fashion or as a form of fetish clothing.

== Construction ==
Stays incorporated in a neck corset are specially made shorter, used to support the weight of the head on the shoulders, while its corset structure helps in maintaining posture by keeping the chin high and the neck extended. It is often combined with a traditional corset in order to achieve better posture.

It can be thin or as thick as the height of the neck. There are many varieties. They can be made of many different fabrics, such as leather, rubber, etc. but some more common fabrics are also used.

Neck corsets usually have back lacing: others have front lacing or are secured by ribbon or zipper.

== BDSM uses ==
Neck corsets are worn by both men and women, mainly in BDSM and goth subcultures. They may be decorated, and may include other bondage elements such as locking closures and D-rings for attaching a leash, rope or other restraints.

When a neck corset is worn to restrict head movement, it is known as a posture collar. Although neck corset restricts head movement it is usually not used for medical purposes like the cervical collar.

A mouth corset is special type of neck corset, designed to also cover the wearer's mouth. They are primarily used in BDSM, because they can be used as gags.

== See also ==
- Fetish fashion
- Gothic fashion
- Neck ring
