= Posture collar =

BDSM device used to restrict movement of the neck

A nude woman at Folsom Street Fair wearing a posture collar

A posture collar is a rigid collar used in BDSM and fetish play that is wide enough to restrict movement of the neck. Posture collars help in maintaining posture, keeping the chin high and the neck extended. Posture collars typically flare widely at the front to reach from the chin to the collarbone, preventing the wearer from hanging their head or looking downward.

Such collars are typically made from leather, but may also be made from metal, rubber, or plastics such as PVC. Posture collars may be decorated, and may include other bondage elements such as locking closures, decorative spikes, or D-rings for attaching other restraints.

A special type of posture collar is a neck corset.

== See also ==
- BDSM
