= Nose hook =

Device used in BDSM activities

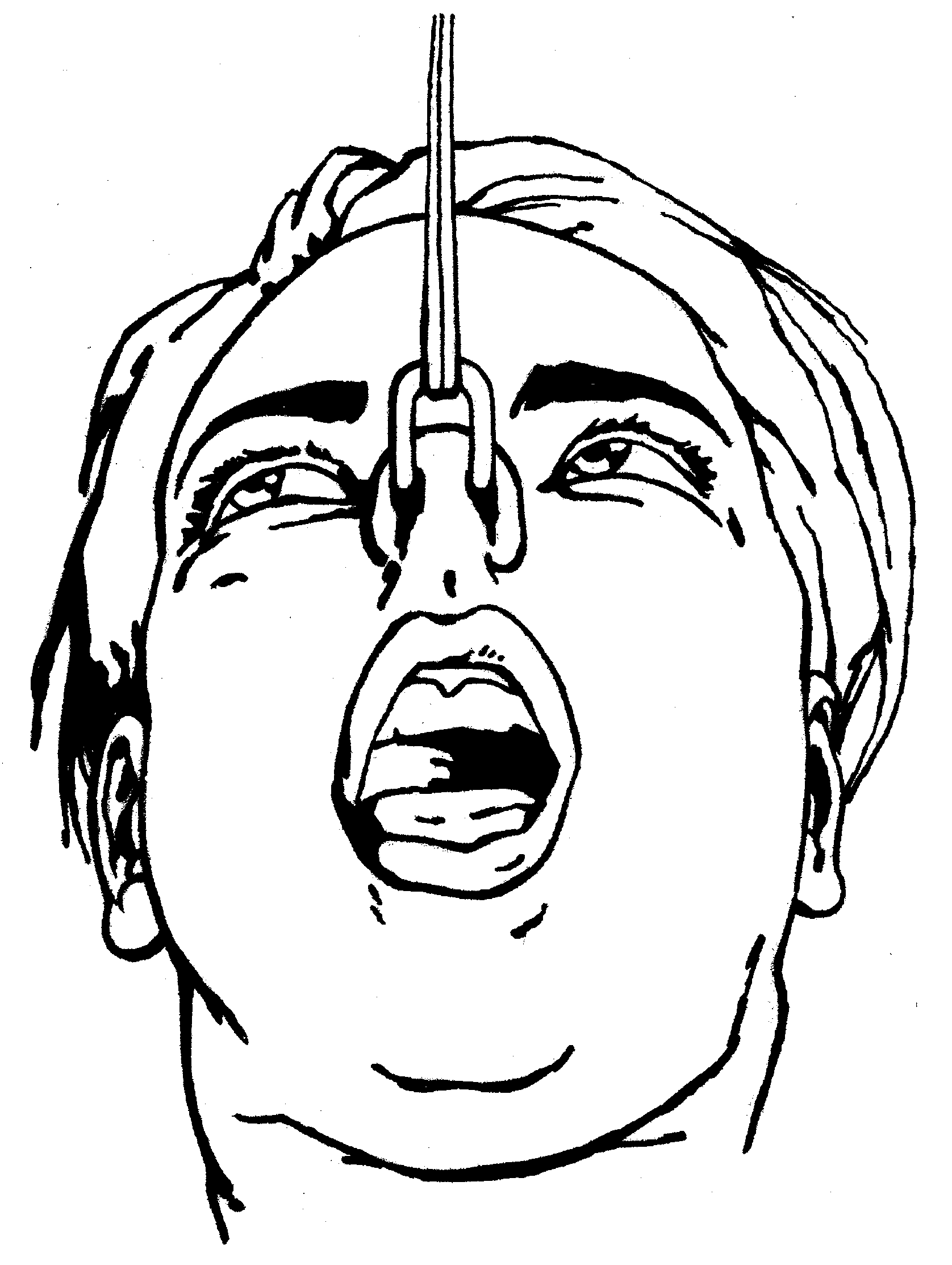
A nosehook in use

A nose hook may be used as part of humiliation play or as part of dehumanization. It may also be used as part of a predicament bondage scene or make bondage more uncomfortable or more strict.

The hooks pull up on the nostrils, giving the user an animalistic or porcine appearance which may add to enjoyment via erotic humiliation. The user may also receive pleasure via masochism, as the use of a nose hook may be painful depending on the level of tension applied.

== See also ==
- List of BDSM equipment
