= Bondage hood =

Hood used in BDSM and fetish fashion

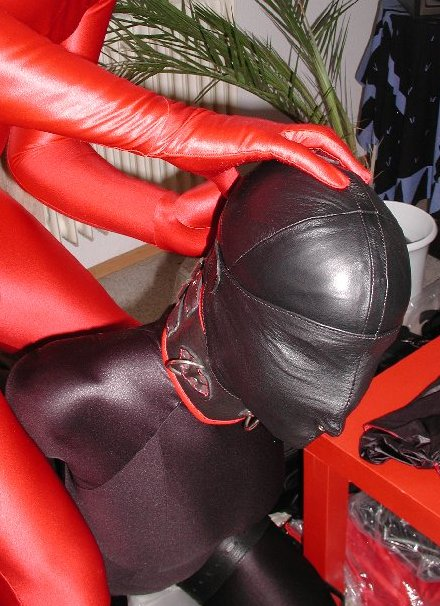
A submissive wearing a zentai and a full-faced leather bondage hood or "gimp mask" that features a ring attachment at the nose and barely visible nostril openings.

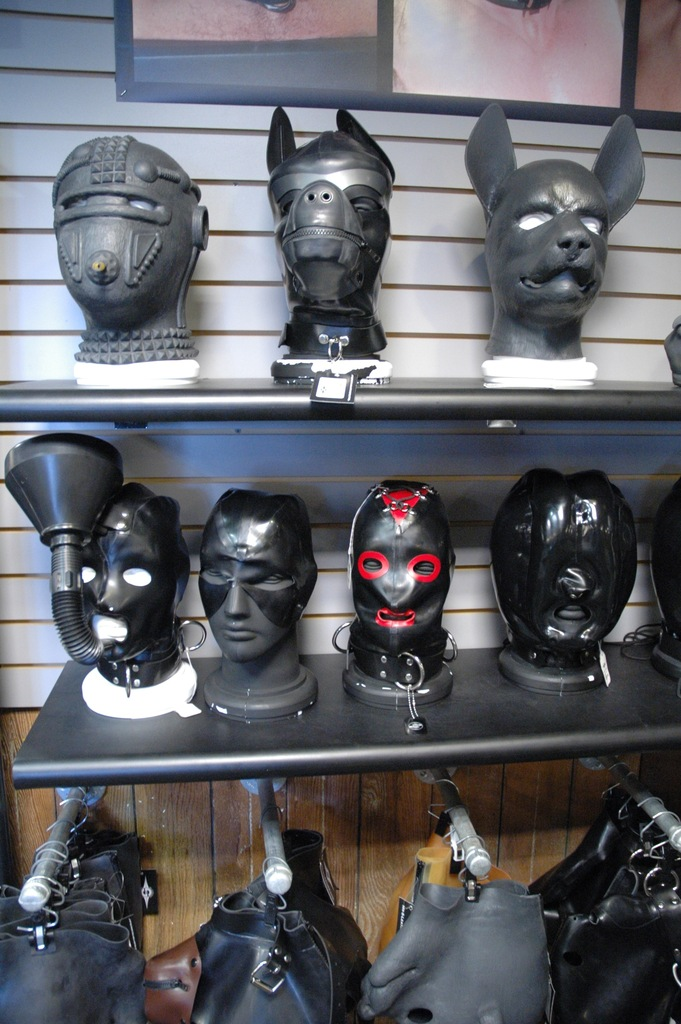
BDSM masks in a boutique in San Francisco, 2009

A bondage hood (also called a gimp mask or bondage mask) is a fetishistic hood. It may be made from rubber, latex, PVC, spandex, darlexx or leather. Full-faced hoods are typically used for the practice of head bondage, and to restrain and objectify the wearer through depersonalization, disorientation and/or sensory deprivation.

The use of bondage hoods can be hazardous if breathing is impeded.

Bondage hoods are frequently referenced in popular culture, most notably in the film Pulp Fiction.

== See also ==
- Total enclosure fetishism
- Gimp suit
- Hooding
