= D-ring =

Item of hardware

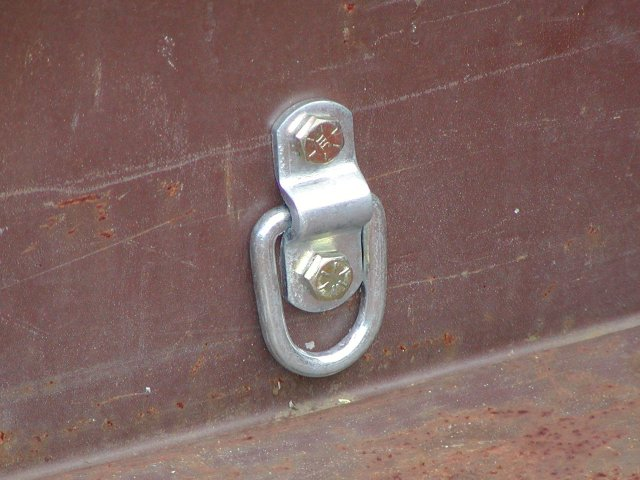
A D-ring used to secure cargo in a utility trailer

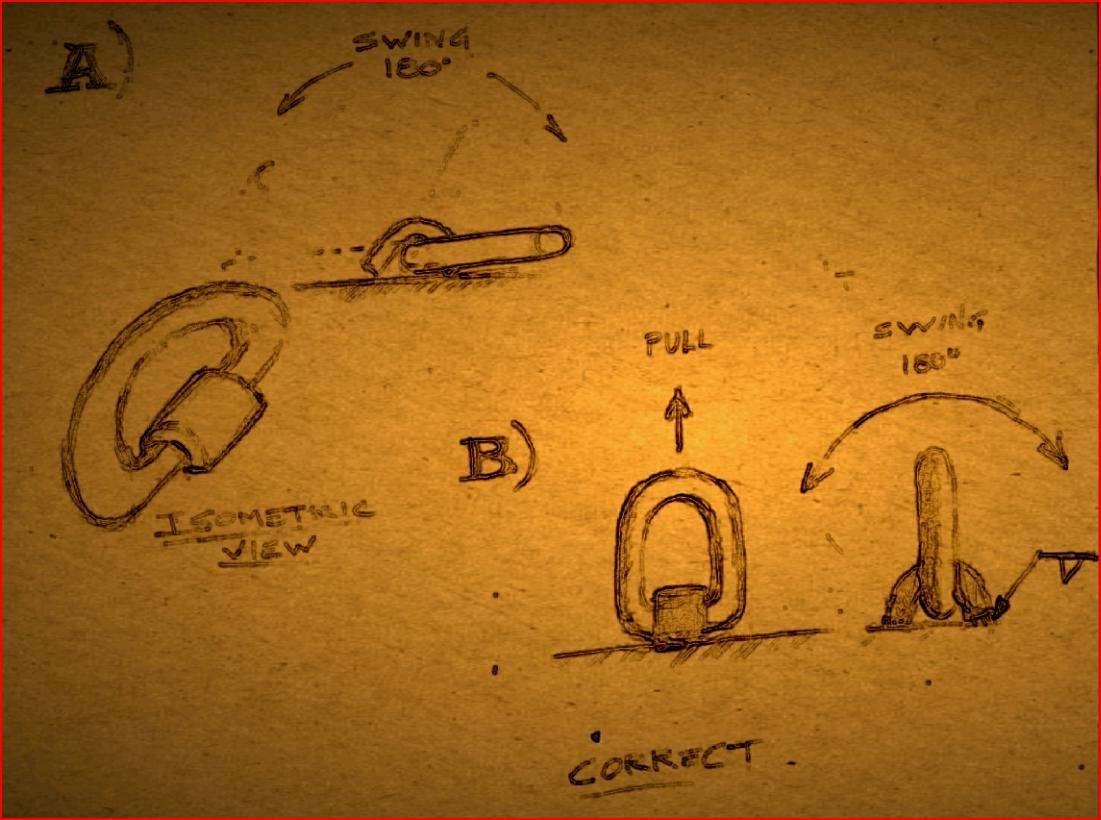
(A) D-ring (shown in isometric view) (B) Weld-on pivot link; note the incorrect fillet weld call-out (bottom-right). The correct method of securing a weld-on pivot link is a [t weld] which consists of a perpendicular vee butt joint secured to the billet using a butt weld or fusion weld.

A D-ring is an item of hardware, usually a tie-down metal ring shaped like a capital letter 'D' used primarily as a lashing or attachment point. The term is found interchangeably spelled in different forms, such as: D ring, D-ring or dee-ring.

A D-ring may be used at the end of a leather or fabric strap, or may be secured to a surface with a metal or fabric strap; though there are D-rings with a middle body designed to be welded to steel. Ideally, a D-ring swings freely after it has been secured. D-rings may vary in composition, geometry, weight, finish and load (rated) capacity.

Though there are differences, a weld-on pivoting link is commonly called a D-ring.

To minimize obstruction when the D-ring is not in use, recessed tie-down rings are designed that accommodate the D-ring so it is flush to the surface. There are some non-recessed designs that have an adhesive base. Work load limits are specified where appropriate.

For D-rings used in the bed of a truck to secure loads, regular preventative maintenance is important to avoid costly repairs.

D-rings may be made of plastic for applications such as fixtures for straps for hiking equipment.

== Common uses ==
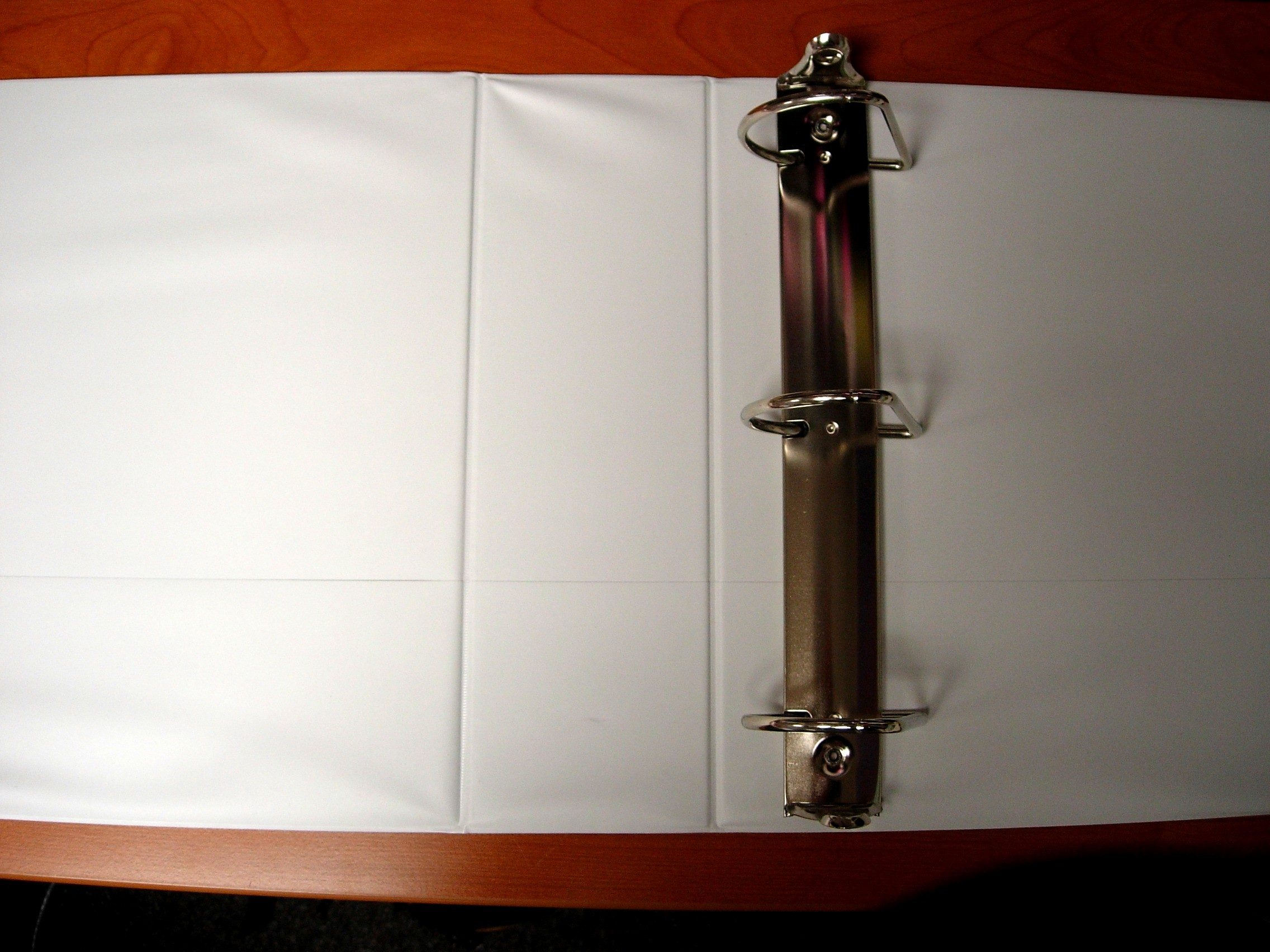
A D ring binder

Applications of D-rings include:

- For light loading applications such as clothing and luggage, D-rings made of plastics such as nylon may be used, as they weigh less and are impervious to rusting.
- As a component for lacing up items of footwear like hiking boots or any adjacent heavy-duty footwear.
- At the end of a tow-rope or chain, to allow the creation a bow around an item or part of an item that is being towed.
- With a chain to tether a boat to a dock or tree when it is being moored.
- In theatres, commonly used where a piece of scenery has to be lifted or "flown". D-rings are attached to the tops or bottoms of flats with a "drift line" and turnbuckle attached to adjust the "trim".
- A D-ring on an M16 or variant type rifle is used to increase the pressure on the extractor and reduce malfunctions. This D-ring is a rubber grommet shaped like a "D" and fits over the extractor spring adding tension to it.
- On breathing sets and scuba divers' buoyancy compensators
- A bit ring used on the bit of a horse.
- A D-ring carabiner has a section which opens and can be secured, to attach a rope for climbing or caving or to attach other items.
- A part of a saddle (see saddle#D-ring)
- A D-ring binder is a type of ring binder which uses D-shaped rings to accommodate larger documents or more pages.
- To attach a leash or tag to a collar or pet harness, or to a waist belt, either for dog walking or for sports where the dog is intended to pull.
- On a prisoner transport belt to accommodate a pair of handcuffs
- As part of BDSM restraints, clothing, or furniture, to act as an attachment point for rope or chain
- For hanging a framed picture, D-rings attached to a small metal plate with a hole in it are used: the D-ring is attached to the frame with a screw through the hole, and the wire to hang the picture passes through the D-ring.
- Two adjacent D-rings can be used as an adjustable fastener for a strap in clothing such as overalls.
