= Human pony harness =

BDSM device

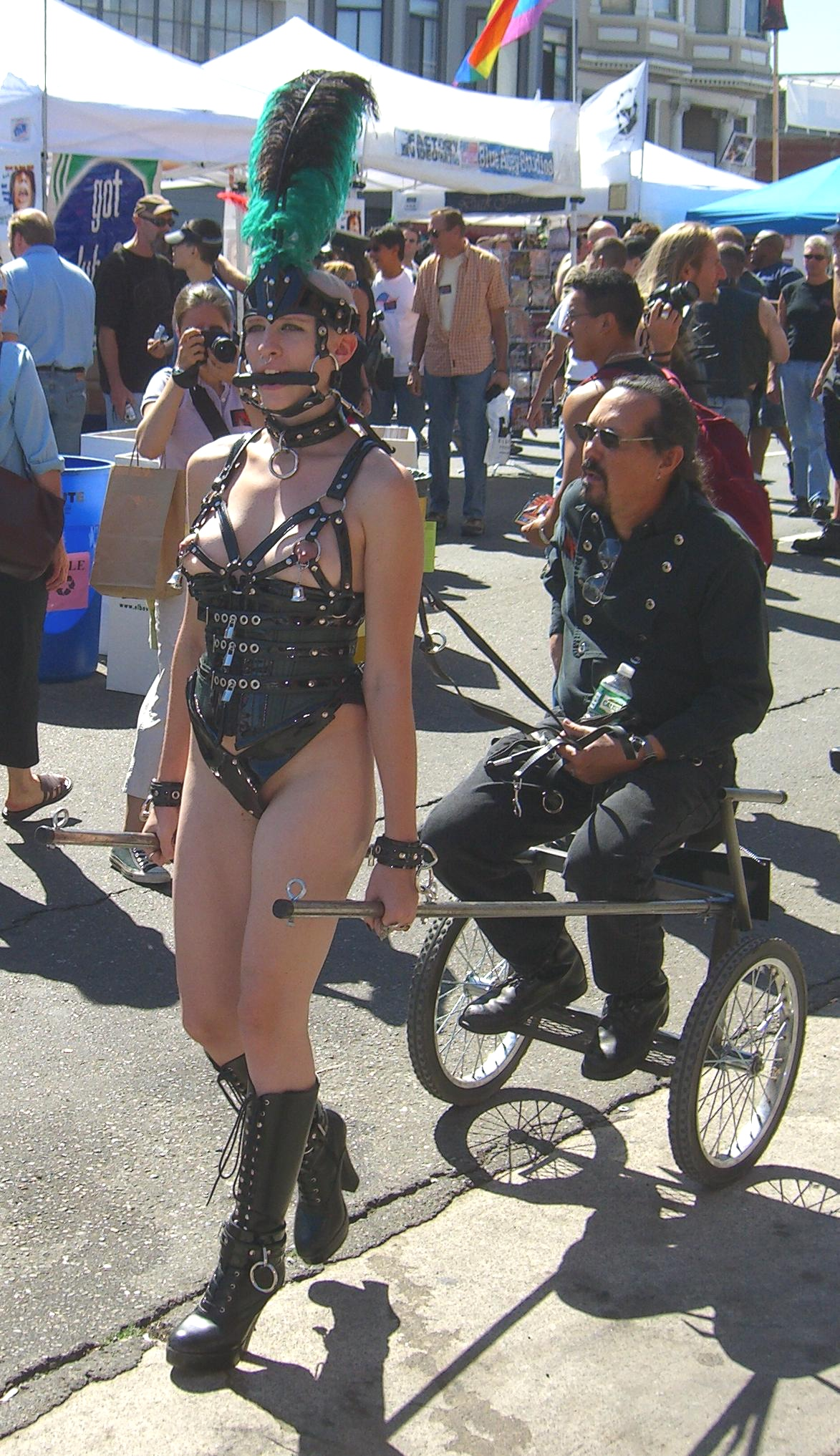
Submissive pulling a cart while in a pony harness at the Folsom Street Fair

A human pony harness is used for bondage: for restraint, decoration, or to facilitate work such as pulling a cart. It is usually made of leather but can be rope, biothane or other appropriate material. It is wrapped (usually with buckles for adjustment) around the wearer's body in such a way that it cannot be slipped off. The wearer may have their hands strapped behind their back, although this is not usually recommended for pulling a cart or other work, in case of a fall. D-rings can be attached, so ropes or chains can be put on to lead the person around.

A human pony harness is modeled off a horse harness, but adjusted for human size and shape. The pony submissive has the harness attached, often with added suitable features for a human pony such as bit-gags and decorative features such as a plume. Once the harness has been placed, the pony can be walked on a leash, attached to and pulling a wagon or other load. This can be encouraged by a pony trainer or handler using a horsewhip or riding crop.

To some fetishists, human pony activities are their kink, and as such the human pony harness is their main sexual toy and the human pony games the core of their fetishism. To others with a more general BDSM interest, a human pony harness can be implemented in a wider range of sexual games of domination. For instance the harness is commonly used for outdoor bondage scenes and public exposure play, it can serve as a simple tool of restraint in sadomasochistic play, etc.

== See also ==
- Bondage harness
- Head bondage
- Pony play
