= Body belt =

Physical restraint device

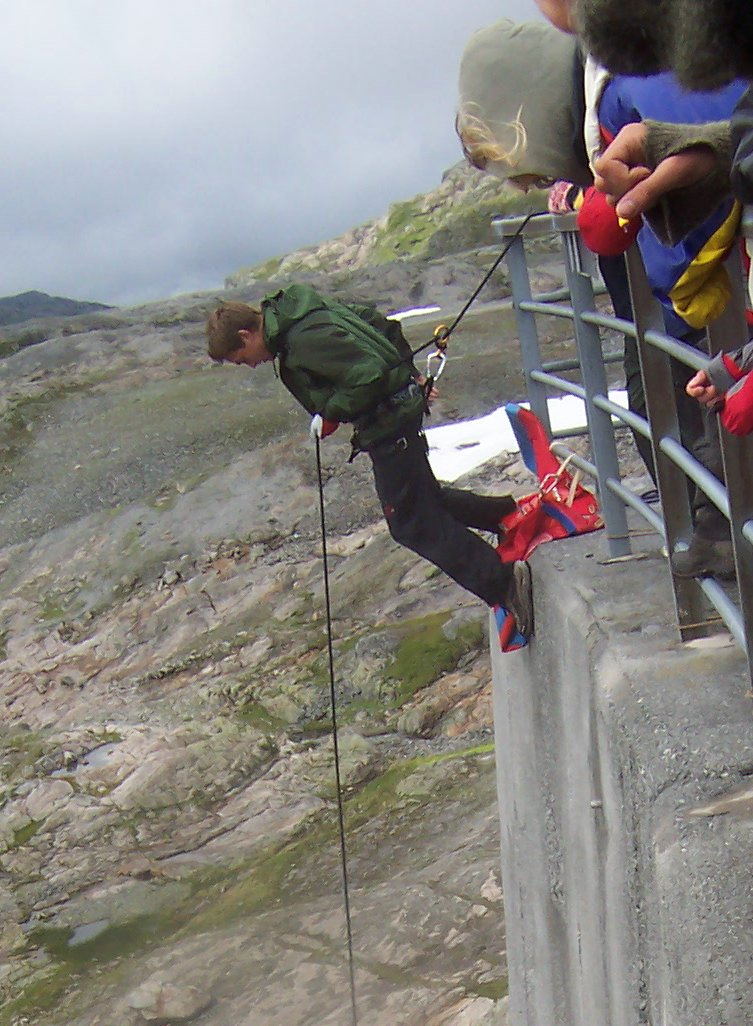
Australian rappel demonstrated at a dam in Norway

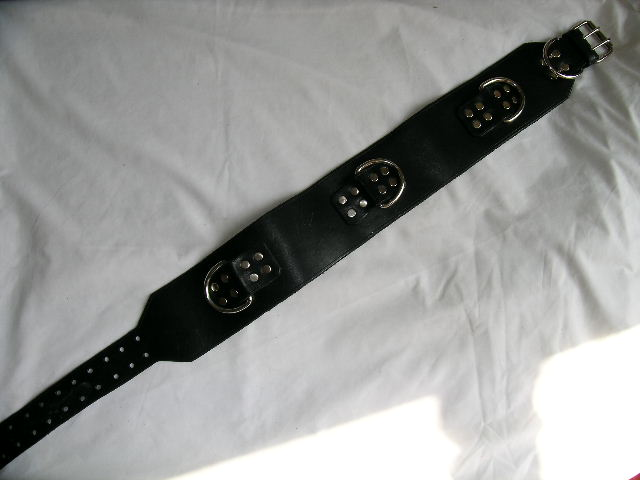
Body belt

A body belt is any waist belt which has D-rings or other attachment points. The belts can be used as medical restraints in institutions for bed and wheelchair restraints, and for safety in activities such as abseiling or construction work. When they are used in sexual bondage plays they are commonly referred to as bondage belts, and also worn in fetish clothing. The belts are usually fastened with buckles and some by a locking mechanism, which enables quick release.

== Use in fall arrest ==
Historically body belts were used as a personal fall arrest system but OSHA rule changes meant they ceased to be acceptable for such use from 1 January 1998.

== Prisoner transport ==
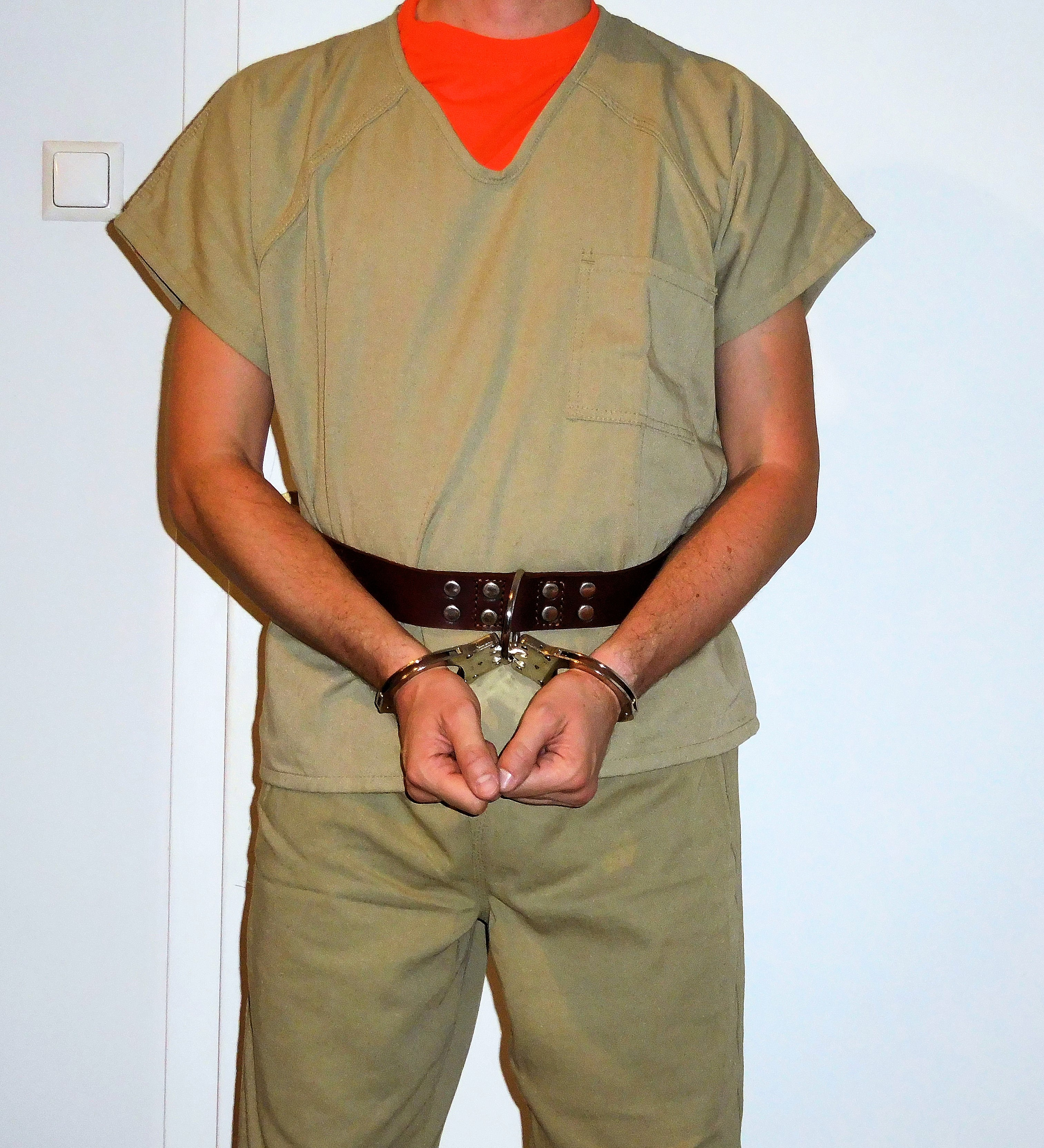
Handcuffed prisoner secured with a transport belt

When transporting prisoners, leather or nylon belts are often used instead of belly chains to secure the prisoner's arms at waist level. These restraint belts have a metal ring on the front, through which the handcuffs are plugged and then put on the detainee's wrists. The belt is then placed around the detainee's waist and secured with a buckle; some models can also be locked with a padlock.

For further control, a stun belt may be fastened around the prisoner's waist. In the case of misbehaviour, the device may give the subject an electric shock.

== Use in sexual bondage ==
For sexual bondage plays a body belt is usually called a bondage belt. Though it is not a physical restraint by itself, it can be used to provide an anchoring point for other restraints, such as bondage cuffs, rope, etc. Lengths of simple leather strapping with buckles are sometimes also referred to as bondage belts, because they can be used quickly to bind limbs.

Most bondage belts are made of fabric or leather as these materials tend to be more comfortable and better distribute pressure over the skin.

== Use in fashion ==
Leather bondage belts have been worn as a fashion accessory by subcultures such as punks and goths. Sid Vicious has been cited for popularising the item in alternative fashion.
