= Bondage harness =

BDSM restraint sometime worn as fetish clothing

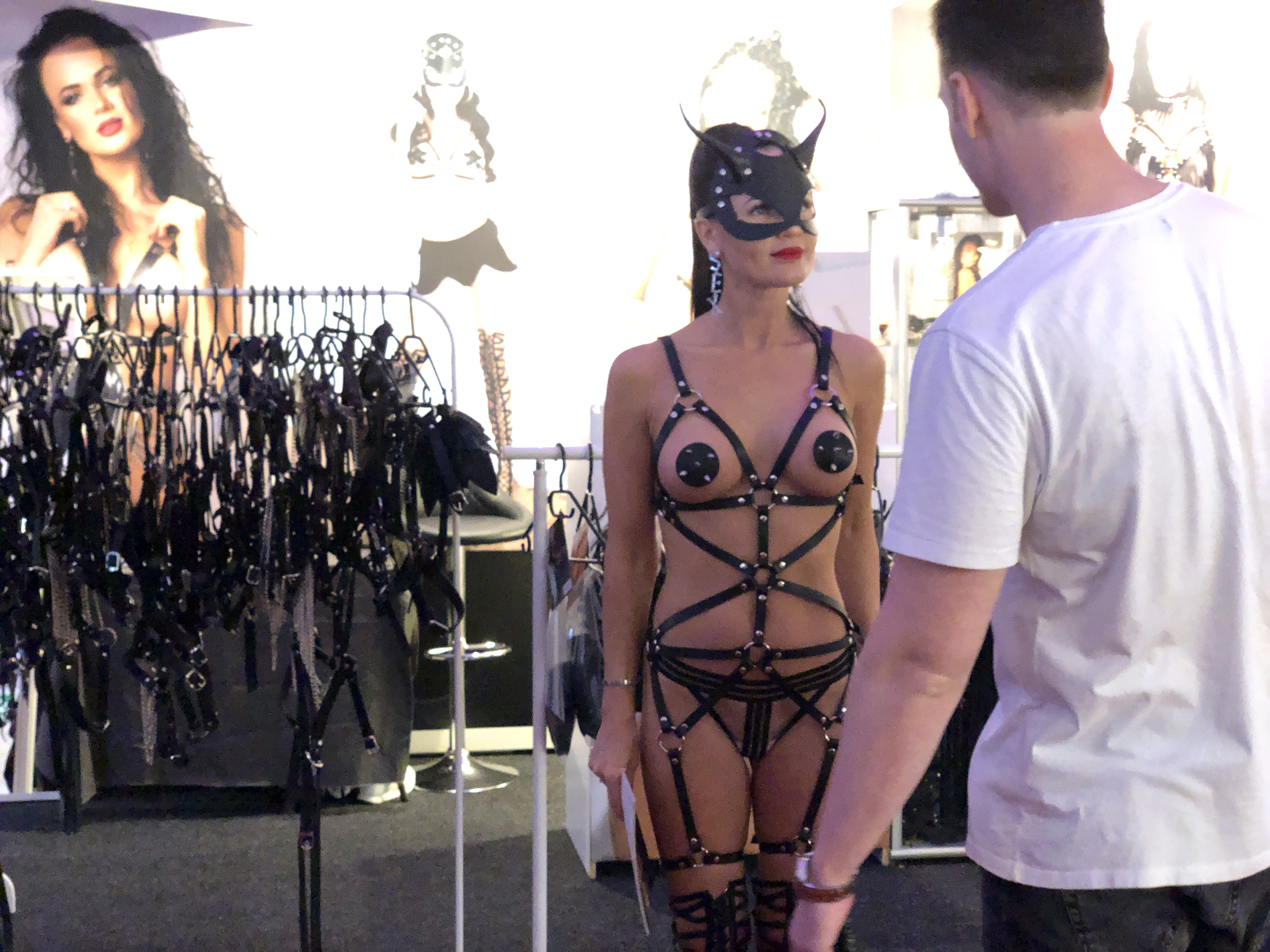
A woman wearing a bondage harness at Venus Berlin, 2019

A bondage harness is a piece of BDSM equipment worn for the purposes of bondage. The harness typically consists of a series of leather straps, usually between 1 and 2 cm wide, attached together in such a way as to allow a person to "wear" the item. Customization of the harness may be needed depending on the specific individual's body.

The item is very closely associated with BDSM play, and is often immediately identifiable as being related to kink. For this reason, it is sometimes worn publicly as a way to reference fetish culture and gain attention. Often the image of a person in a bondage harness is used in media as a trope for "someone into fetish play", such as in the Sin City comic book series.

== Variations ==
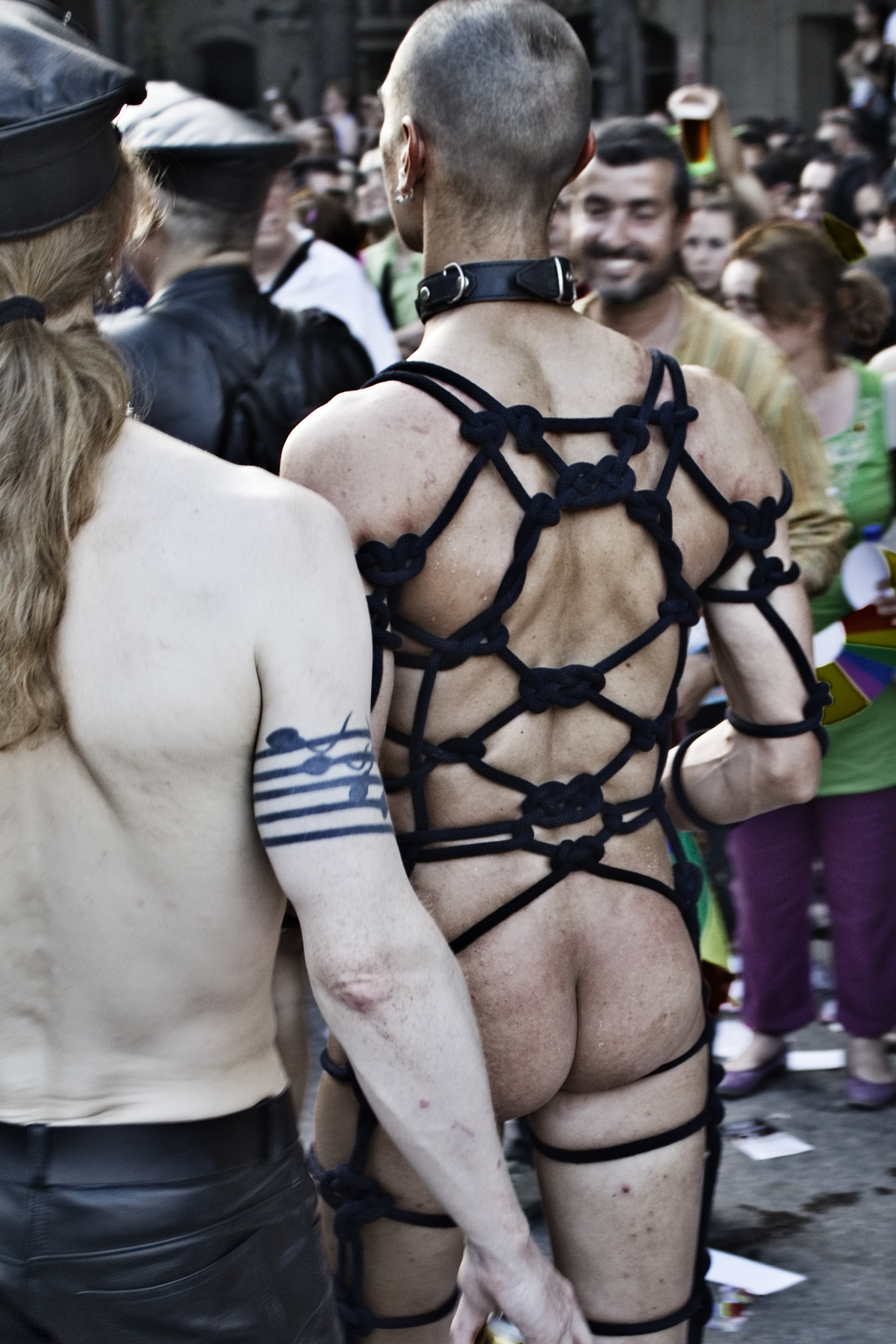
A male in rope bondage, 2010.

The harness typically consists of a main central strap that runs in front and at the back, but with two separating straps where it passes around the head. This central strap runs between the legs, between the buttocks and up to an area midway up the back where it meets the other end of the strap. The straps are then secured together – typically with a standard buckle such as that used on a belt to hold pants up.

When fitted to a male, the harness splits in half in a similar way to the way it splits to go around the head so as to pass around the male genitals. On a female, the harness usually runs straight between the legs. There are then several other straps running out at right angles from the main central strap (usually, but not limited to, 3–4 straps). These straps wrap around the body with the two ends secured to each other using further buckles. On a female, the straps may be above and below the breasts, creating a form of breast bondage, with further straps around the waist. On a male, the straps usually criss-cross over the chest and abdomen to emphasize male physique.

The item can be worn as it is on the body simply as a form of dress, but can also be used for restraint. The arms can easily be held behind the back by running the horizontal straps over the arms rather than under them against the body. When secured tightly, the arms are then pinned against the body by these straps. Further, the harness can be used as an anchor for additional restraints.

== See also ==
- Bondage rope harness
- Human pony harness
