= Butt welding =

Welding of metal pieces placed end-to-end (butt joint)

Video: Automatic butt-welding machine

Butt welding is when two pieces of metal are placed end-to-end without overlap and then welded along the joint (as opposed to lap joint weld, where one piece of metal is laid on top of the other, or plug welding, where one piece of metal is inserted into the other). Importantly, in a butt joint, the surfaces of the workpieces being joined are on the same plane and the weld metal remains within the planes of the surfaces.

== Types ==
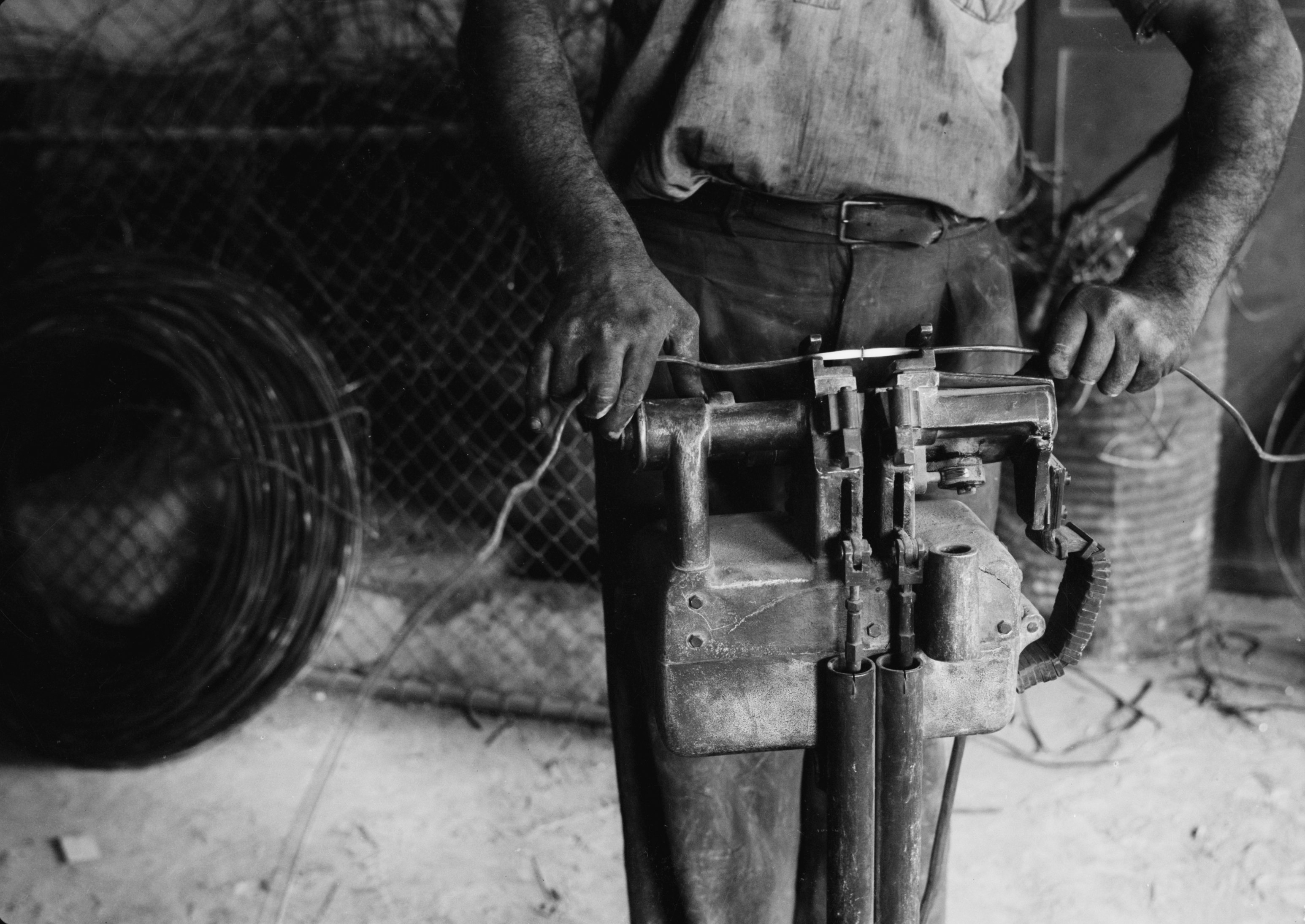
Electric welding of wire before wire drawing at the 'Barzelit' wire drawing and nail factory in Mandatory Palestine

Flash butt welding is used with machinery and connects multiple pieces of metal together that are miss matched in size and shape. These different sizings can oftentimes cause for breaks in welding process. High voltage current is applied in order to connect the metal pieces together by applying it to both the components known as flashing in order to join them together.

This weld joins the two pieces of metal together by heat that comes from the pressure due to the metals being held together at a preset force. Resistance butt welding is used on joints that are of similar shape and size and often the weld is performed in one movement unlike flash welding.

Single-V Butt Weld

There are many different types of butt welding joints and they all are named with their particular shape. The joint also known as a square groove weld has many different forms in order to connect pieces of metal together and are all capable of bearing loads. There are many different types of joints such as lap joints, tee joints, butt joints, and also corner joints. Lap joints are two pieces that are end-over-end and welded together whereas butt welds are put end to end and connected that way. Butt welds are connected to each other with the thickness of the parent metal. There are many different kinds of butt welds such as square, single v, double v, single bevel, double bevel, single u, double u, single j, and also a double j. Minimizing the distortions in a weld is important however doing so will minimize the chances of full penetration. In order to get full penetration double welds such as double v, double j, and double u may be used.

== Uses ==
Butt welding is a commonly used technique in welding that can either be automated or done by hand on steel pieces. Butt welding can also be done with brazing for copper pieces. It is used to attach two pieces of metal together such as pipe, framework in factories, and also flanges. A flange is something that either is internal or external that provided to strengthen a piece of material. Factory fabrication demonstrates the cost-effectiveness of butt welding versus the more expensive overall processes of bending stock, reinforcing joints, and using fasteners where required.

Butt welding is accomplished by heating up two pieces of metal, or applying pressure, or doing both of those. Penetration while welding the metal is important to maintain and with thin pieces of metal this is possible however, with thick pieces edge preparation may have to be done to prepare the metal. Full penetration butt welds are made when they are in the within the parent(bigger, stronger) metal. In butt welding the strongest welds will have the fewest imperfections. To achieve this the heat input is controlled, which decreases the size of the weld. In commercial welding when this is done it also reduces cost but in order to maintain the strength of the weld double butt welds will be used. In butt welding there are two types used to achieve the specific welds and then there are also a variety of joints considered to be butt joints.

Butt welding is best performed with MIG or TIG welding applications due to their natural ability to connect two pieces of metal together. Using different types of welding electrodes for the welder will determine the properties of the weld such as its resistance against corrosion and strength. Electrodes conduct current through the metal being welded in order join the two pieces. The metal determines the type of welding that is required. The electrodes are either heavily or lightly coated. For the heavily coated electrodes are commonly used in structural welding because they are much stronger and corrosion resistant. The lightly coated electrodes are not as structurally sound. Butt welding is performed with the Arc, TIG, or MIG welder held at a slight angle the weld if the weld is laying flat in order to achieve the least amount of porosity in the weld and also to increase the weld's strength. Fillet welding make up about 80 percent of the connection despite being weaker than butt welds. The reason it is used more often is because fillet welds offer more room for error with much larger tolerances. Fillet welding is not a type of butt weld despite its similarities.

== Standards ==
EN 1993-1-8, which covers the design of joints in the design of steel structures, defines a set of provisions for welding structural steel.

== See also ==
- Fillet weld – Welding technique
- Flare groove weld – Location where metal or plastic workpieces are joined together
- Weld access hole
- Welding joint – Location where metal or plastic workpieces are joined together
