= Anal hook =

BDSM play device

Stainless steel anal hook

An anal hook or ass hook is a sex toy, often resembling a fish hook in appearance, intended for anal sexual penetration or other sexual activity. Anal hooks can be made from a multitude of materials, although stainless steel is the most common. Their design is typically a curved metal bar, with a metal ball on one end and a ring on the other. Unlike other toys intended for anal penetration, like dildos and anal beads, anal hooks are universally made from inflexible materials like stainless steel, and can much more readily cause injury if used improperly.

Bondage hooks should never be used for potentially load-bearing restraint because of the potential for injury. They are sometimes woven into rope harnesses on the body or into rope attached to the hair, neither of which involve load bearing on the hook itself.
