= Darlexx =

Warp knit fabric laminated to a monolithic film

Darlexx, a product of the Shawmut Corporation, is a warp knit fabric laminated to a monolithic film. It is a sports performance fabric used in gloves, boots, wet suits, ski apparel, clean rooms, and in medical applications. It was designed to keep a person "warm when the environment is cold and cool when the environment is hot" and is breathable, windproof, and waterproof.

It is also useful in applications in specialty orthopedic garments and clothing along with coverings for different seating and positioning systems on wheelchairs.

== Types ==
There are two variations of Darlexx:

- Darlexx Superskin, a two-ply nylon and Lycra mix that provides less drag, and thus is used for competition swimming, skiing and running apparel.
- Darlexx Thermalastic, a three-ply Lycra with thermoplastic film and microfiber fleece that has all-directional stretch and insulation, and is used in watersports and skiing apparel.
