= Vacuum bed =

Device for BDSM play

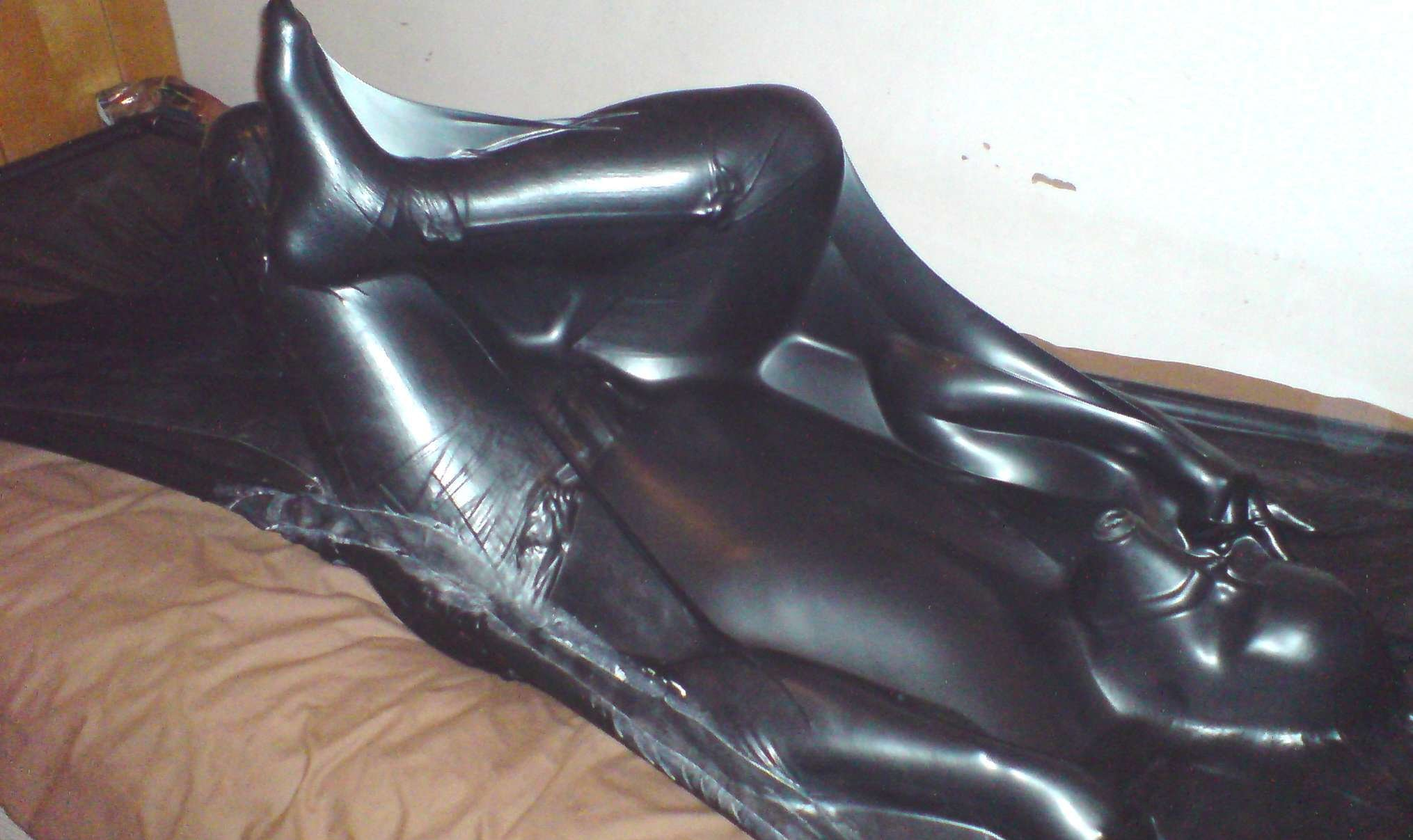
Vacuum bed

A vacuum bed is a device sometimes used in BDSM play.

A person is placed in a latex envelope spanned by a frame and a suction pump or floor vacuum removes most of the air in the envelope. The frame can be either a simple rectangle or three-dimensional frame, commonly made of pierced PVC pipes joined by PVC joints or stronger materials like metal.

There are several ways that the vacuum bed can be designed to facilitate breathing. The most common is a tube running from outside of the vacuum bed into the person's mouth. A second option is a reinforced hole that is positioned so that the mouth protrudes. A third option is a reinforced gasket through which one forces the entire head. Incorporating a related fetish, some vacuum beds use a gas mask to facilitate respiration.

The vacuum bed is both a bondage and sensation device. The user is unable to move significantly (although some wiggling is possible), and is unable to speak or see, depending on the breathing hole used. The sensation of the vacuum bed itself, as well as any other play (stroking, percussion, vibrations), can be pleasurable to some users, and some find experiences much more intense than what would be experienced without the vacuum bed.

The vacuum bed must be used with the aid of another person, as the user cannot control the vacuum itself, nor escape the vacuum bed unaided.

There is also a danger of positional asphyxia, as well as the other dangers associated with bondage activities.
