= Sleepsack (BDSM) =

Restraint device used for BDSM

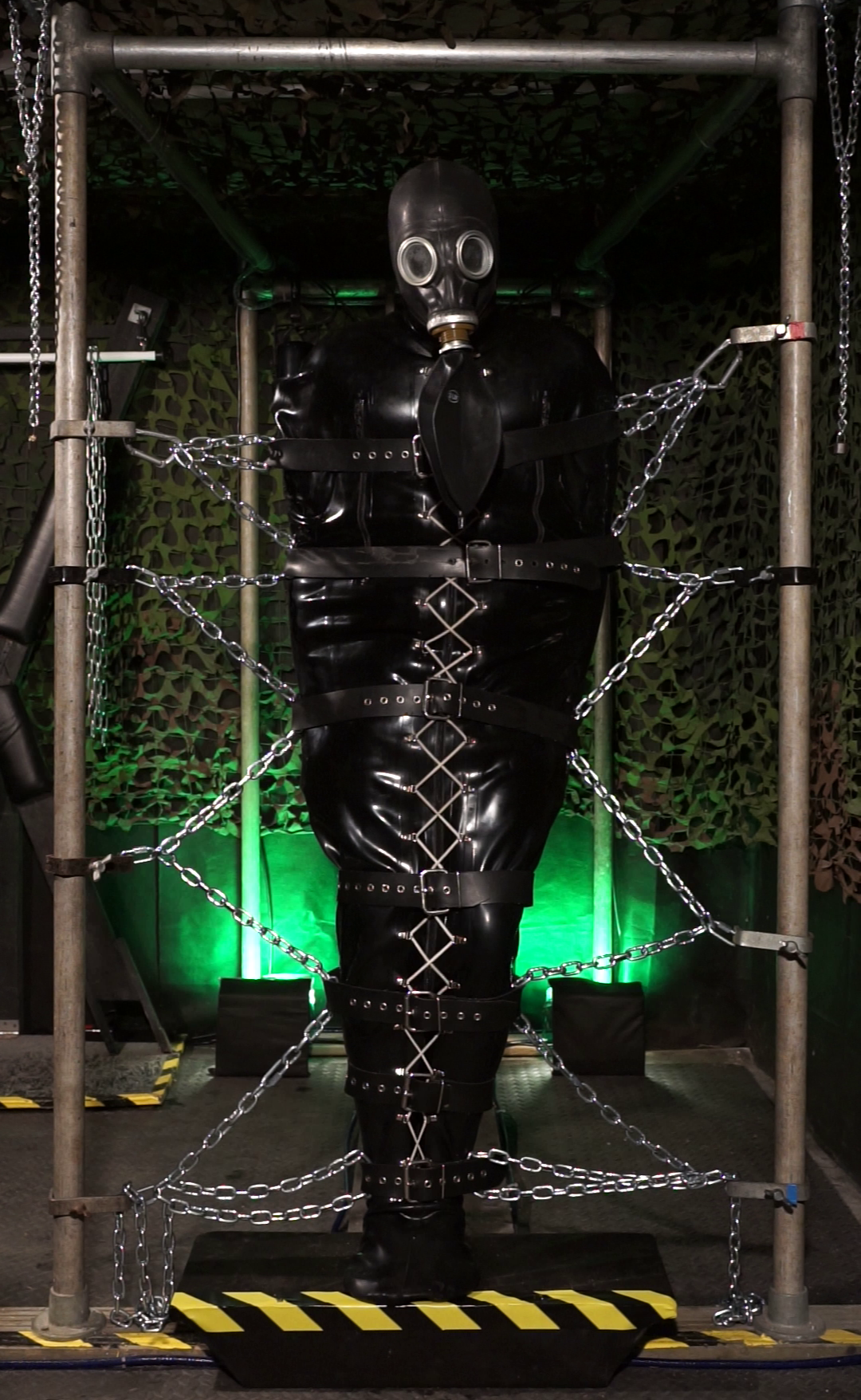
Rubber sleepsacks can be used as part of bondage play.

Sleepsacks are a type of bondage (BDSM) gear. Sleepsacks are primarily used to confine a person comfortably for an extended period of time. Similar to a conventional sleeping bag, a person climbs into a sleepsack and is usually zipped into it up to their neck. Generally sleepsacks are very tight on the body, much like mummification, which adds to the total encasement aspect of the experience.

== Design ==
Sleepsacks are designed so the person is as immobile as possible, while offering a convenient alternative to the time-consuming wrapping of elastic bandages and/or sticky mess of athletic tape associated with traditional mummy-type bondage. There is generally a pocket at the bottom that the wearer's feet go into. A durable zipper runs from below the knees up to the neck. Generally sleepsacks have collars at the top which buckle around the neck, further securing the person in it. Instead of a single pull zipper most sleepsacks have triple zippers which allow for an opening anywhere along the length of the zipper. Sleepsacks with the zipper as described will also usually have internal arm sleeves. With arms in the internal arm sleeves the wearer is unable to have access to any part of their body.

== Materials ==
Sleepsacks can be made from several different types of materials. Each type of material offers a different experience. The most popular material is probably leather. Other common types of sleepsacks are rubber, canvas, satin, Darlexx, and Neoprene. Of course virtually any flexible material, from denim to saran wrap, from wool to nylon stockings, or just a sleeping bag and rope, may be used to achieve the desired feel of total encasement. For many BDSM participants the type of material in which they are bound is as much or even more of a fetish than the bondage itself. Here are the most often used types of sleepsacks :

Leather sleepsacks are generally very confining but do not stretch. If they are sized correctly they are very comfortable for long-term usage, and many bondage enthusiasts spend entire nights comfortably confined in them. In order to make the tightest fit possible, many leather sleepsacks have small D-rings down each side of the main zipper along the front of the sack, which allows the sack to be pulled tighter around the body using rope laced between the D-rings. This system of D-rings and rope lacing also protects the zipper from any stress that the occupant of the sack might exert on it. To further add to the confining aspects of the sleepsack, there are usually straps or belts that go around the body at intervals along the length of the sack, starting at the collar and going down to the ankles. To keep the straps in place and prevent them from shifting, they pass through larger D-rings down the sides of the sleepsack.

Leather sleepsacks are probably the most durable type of sleepsack. They often come with bondage hooks or rings along the sides, at the shoulders, and at the feet for attaching restraints, tie-downs, or rope, to further secure the sack and occupant to a bed, bondage frame, or table. Leather sleepsacks can also be suspended upright or horizontal with the appropriate knowledge and equipment.

There are many options that can be built into a sleepsack, including separate zippers or removable flaps at nipples, a zipper from the lower spine to below the buttocks, attachable hoods, removable foot sacks, smooth leather lining, padding, internal arm sleeves, etc. Highly specialized leather sleepsacks have additional strapping and reinforcement allowing the sack and its occupant to be suspended in various positions safely.

Since leather doesn't breathe, some individuals may sweat during their confinement. Depending on the amount of moisture present after use, wiping the inside of the sleepsack with a cloth may be necessary. In all cases, allowing the leather plenty of time to air-out and dry before being stored is very important, as moisture can lead to mould developing inside the sleepsack. Since leather sleepsacks can be very expensive, costing over $2,000, they must be treated with care to ensure the leather isn't damaged.

Rubber sleepsacks are also very confining but do have some stretch. This natural stretch is what causes rubber sleepsacks to be confining and tight. As with leather the sizing of a rubber sleepsack is very important for a proper fit. People who have a rubber fetish interest like rubber sleepsacks for obvious reasons.

Rubber sleepsacks do not disperse moisture at all. For this reason hydration is a very important consideration for people who spend any amount of time in a rubber sleepsack. Sweating can often be profuse even if the occupant is only lying inside it. All fluids from the body accumulate in the sack, which also makes the rubber sleepsack a choice for those who are also have a urination fetish. Rubber sleepsacks are easy to clean as they can simply be rinsed with water. Sweat leaking out from the neck, as well as through any zippers along the sack, can often occur while lying flat and should be a consideration.

Neoprene sleepsacks offer a similar stretch and feel of rubber with less wear and tear damage due to the material's stronger properties. Neoprene does not stretch as easily as rubber offering a firmer restriction approaching that provided by leather sleep sacks. Neoprene is also a cheaper material and can be significantly less expensive as leather while having similar durability. Like rubber, neoprene does not disperse moisture so hydration is an important consideration for people spending time in a neoprene sleepsack.

Darlexx sleepsacks are made of a spandex-like material. Darlexx stretches much like spandex but is much more durable. One main benefit of Darlexx sleepsacks is they are significantly cheaper than leather and rubber, and can accommodate a wider range of sizes due to how much it can comfortably stretch. Although still very confining Darlexx does not put as much compression on the body as rubber, making it more comfortable to stay in for longer periods of time.

Satin sleepsacks have no ability to stretch, are somewhat breathable, but lack the durability of the other more common materials used for sleepsack construction. Given the low durability aspect, satin sleepsacks are rarely marketed and are generally home-made, but BDSM enthusiasts with a fetish for satin, or for that matter any other particular fabric, may find its well worth the time and effort creating their own.

== Sleepsacks in BDSM culture ==
Sleepsacks are an effective way to secure somebody comfortably, but also tightly, for long periods of time. Generally someone will need to be assisted into and out of a sleepsack by another person. There are neck-entry type sleepsacks which are open at the top and do not have a full zipper. These types of sleepsacks are good for those who want to have a similar experience on their own.

The immobility that sleepsacks cause to the occupant is a major reason they are popular. Sleepsacks also provide a great way to secure someone for many types of bondage and BDSM play, which may or may not include sexual activity.

In addition to immobilization, sleepsacks enhance sensory play, especially with a dominant partner. By restricting movement, the dom controls the submissive's senses, increasing vulnerability and submission. The dom ensures safety and comfort through constant monitoring, particularly during extended use.

== Safety considerations ==
As with any type of bondage, there are considerations that must be taken prior to entry into sleepsack bondage.

- Never leave someone alone. Should any type of unforeseen circumstance arise (such as fire, police raid, etc.) it will be impossible for the person in the sleepsack to get out.
- Hydration. As in any type of long-term bondage and especially in rubber, dehydration is a major and often underestimated problem.
- Watch the zipper. Since most people who want to be in a sleepsack also will want to be naked, making sure all body parts are away from the zipper is obvious but important enough to mention.
- Circulation issues. A general rule of bondage is the person being restrained should change positions about once every hour to prevent circulation problems. Sleepsacks are often an exception to this rule as the body is held in a position to allow for normal circulation. That said there are still opportunities for problems with extended time in a sleepsack. Often issues arise with the shoulder area being overly compressed or the arms not fitting properly into the sleeves. Preventing this from getting to be a real problem goes back to the #1 rule of not being left alone.
- Safeword. Also a general rule of bondage/BDSM play, having a safeword available for someone to use when they really need to be released is very important.

== Appeal ==
- Power exchange. Giving up control of a situation to someone else.
- Tactile sensations. The tactile feeling of the material involved.
- Loss of control. The feeling of restraint and helplessness.
- Comfort. Comfortable for long-term bondage; many fantasies of waking up in bondage are satisfied by falling asleep then waking up in a sleepsack.
- Ease of use. Generally very easy to get into, requires little equipment or knowledge of bondage techniques.
- Combining equipment. Can easily be combined with hoods, creating a feeling of total or nearly total sensory deprivation.
- Other play. With the heavy-duty triple zipper on many sleepsacks it is easy to incorporate many elements of BDSM play, including CBT, orgasm control and orgasm denial.
