= Cycling kit =

Equipment and attire worn by sportive cyclists

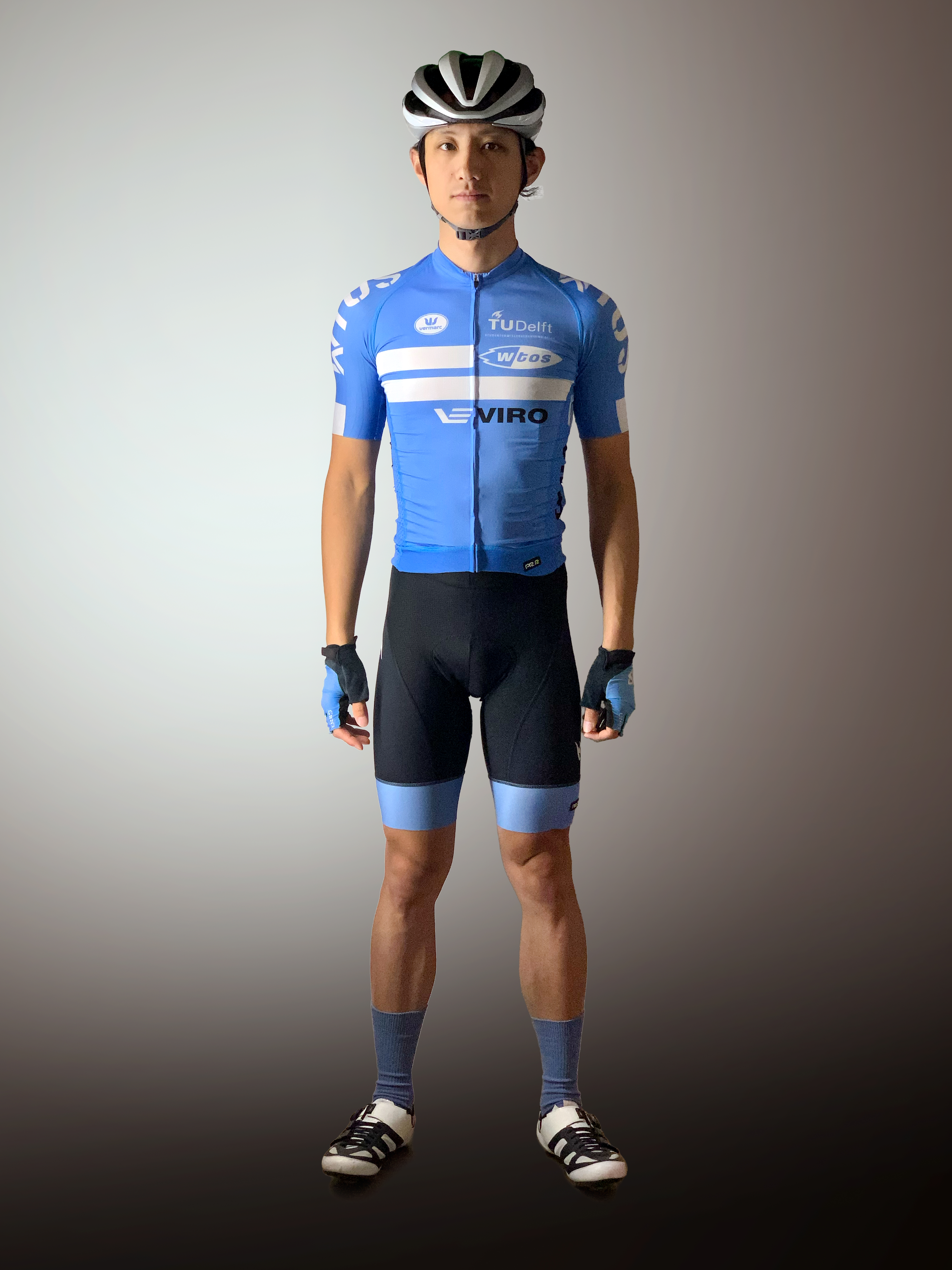
A road cyclist wearing a typical summer cycling kit.

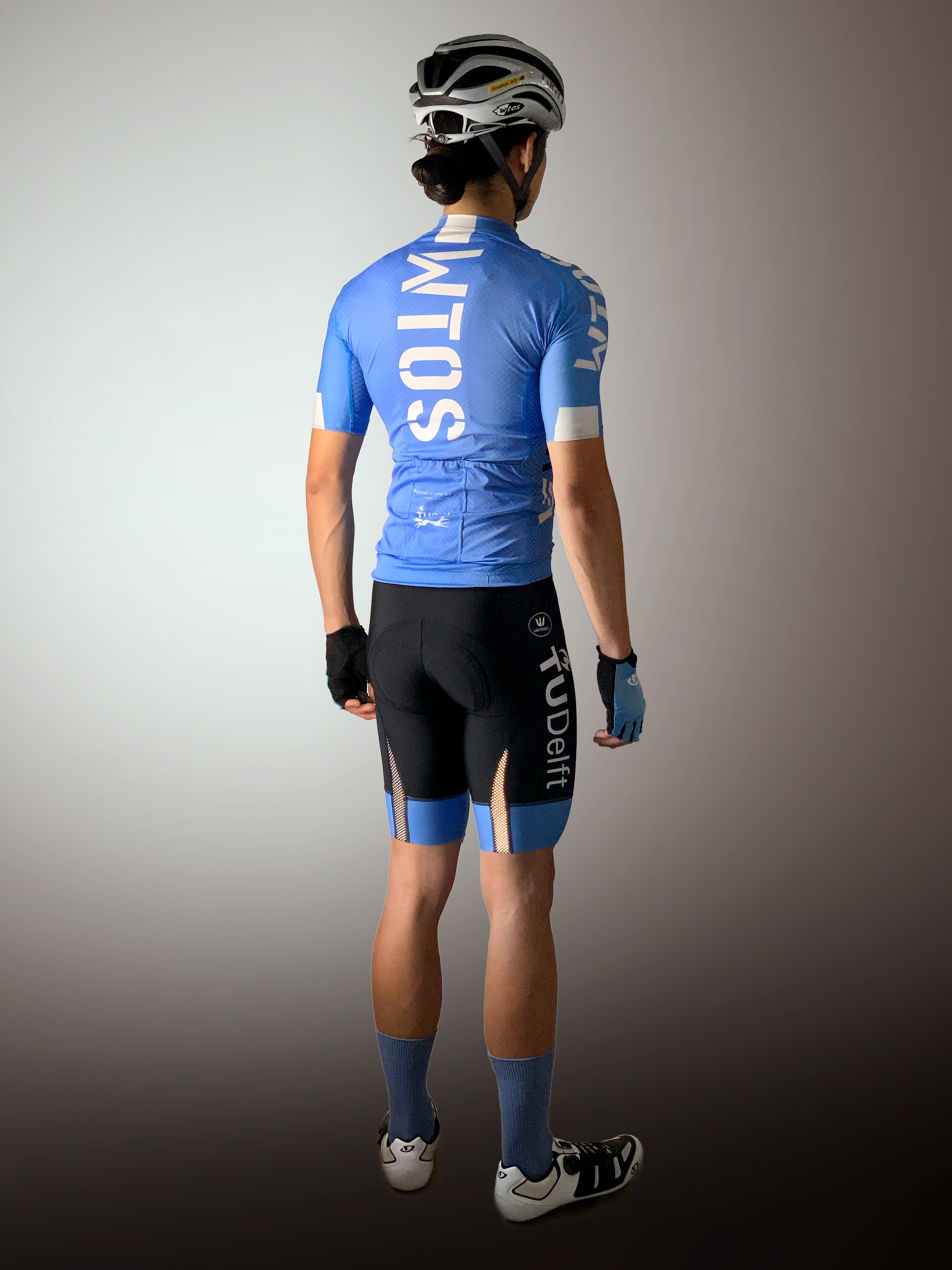
Rear view of the summer cycling kit, featuring a jersey with back pockets and bib shorts with padding.

In competitive cycling, the kit (or uniform) is the standard equipment and attire worn specifically by athletes participating in the sport. The outfits differ from the clothes worn in other forms of cycling, such as commuting and recreational cycling (for which people are likely to wear ordinary street clothes, perhaps with a coat or rain cape). Competitive kit uses technical and performance materials and features to improve efficiency and comfort. The UCI specify the kit and the design the riders use.

Cycling kits have evolved significantly since the early days of the sport when participants wore wool jerseys. Recent advances in manufacturing and technology have enabled lighter, more comfortable, colourful and complex designs to be made. Cycling kits nowadays are made primarily with synthetic materials, such as Lycra, which conforms to the body, thereby reducing drag by eliminating loose fabric as well as increase in comfort. Made-to-order custom kits with tailored cuts made to order are becoming increasingly common for individuals, clubs and teams to produce kits with custom designs. Notable brands include Adidas, Castelli, Pearl Izumi, Rapha and Santini SMS.

Cycling kits in professional races are usually featured with sponsor logos and advertising, and specific colours and/or patterns signify certain position or a leader in a race. In a race, cyclists pin race numbers of the race on the back of the jersey (and another on the bike). To generate revenue for the professional teams, replica kits are generally made available for fans to purchase.

== Equipment for the cyclist ==
=== Basic equipment ===
The basic equipment set out in the UCI technical regulation guide (Section 3: riders’ clothing) includes a jersey with sleeves, a pair of shorts and possibly a skinsuit.

Generally speaking, the typical summer cycling kit (whether racing or not) consists of:

- Helmet: head protection in case of a fall
- Cycling jersey: covering the torso
- Bib shorts or shorts for the lower half of the body and often includes pads for added comfort
- Skinsuit, an alternative one-piece combining the jersey and shorts commonly used in time trials
- Socks, typically medium length
- Cycling shoes: specialised shoes with stiff soles for efficient power transfer with cleats: to attach to the pedals

and in spring/autumn the additional pieces:

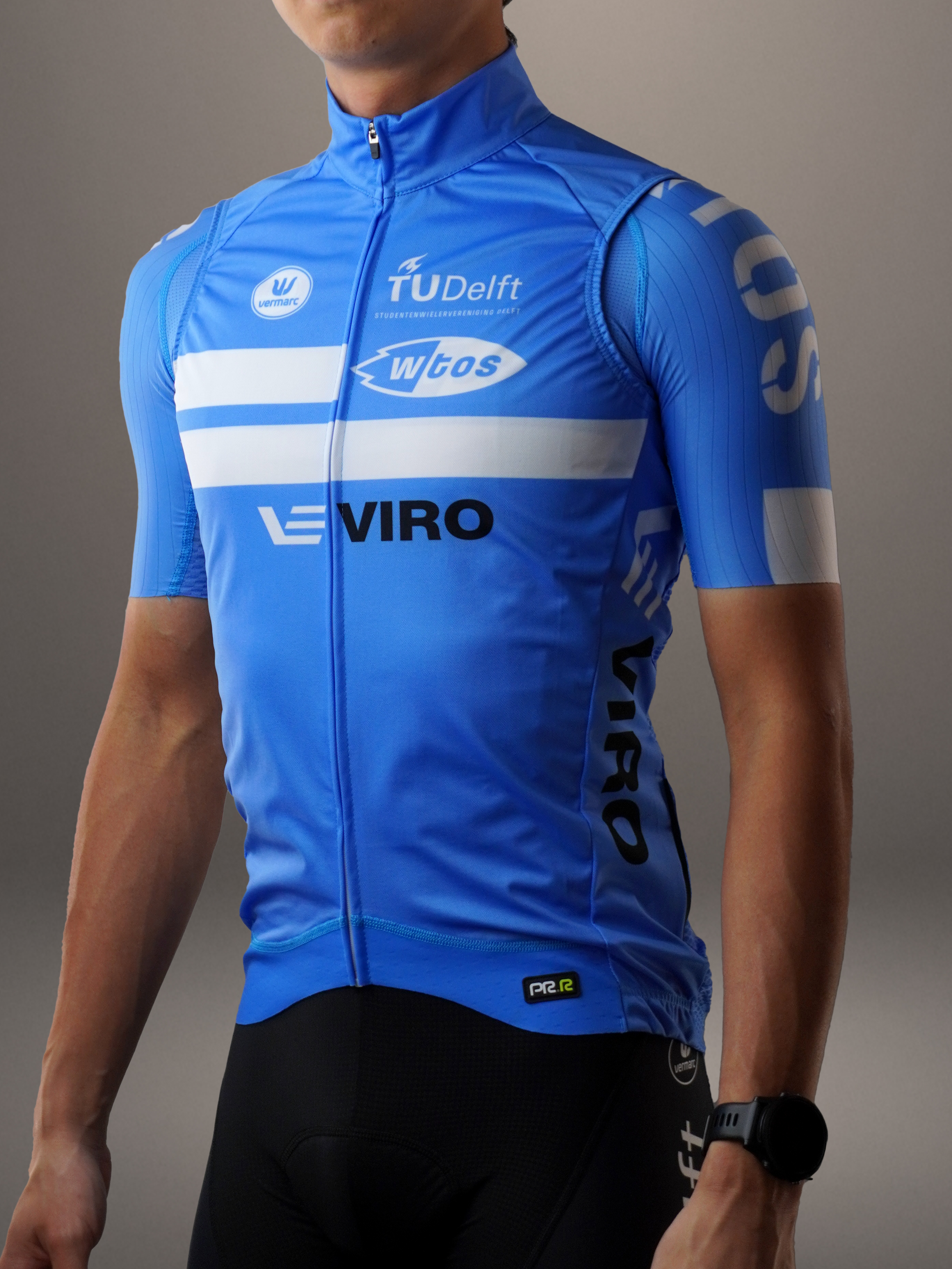
Windproof cycling gilet worn over the gilet.

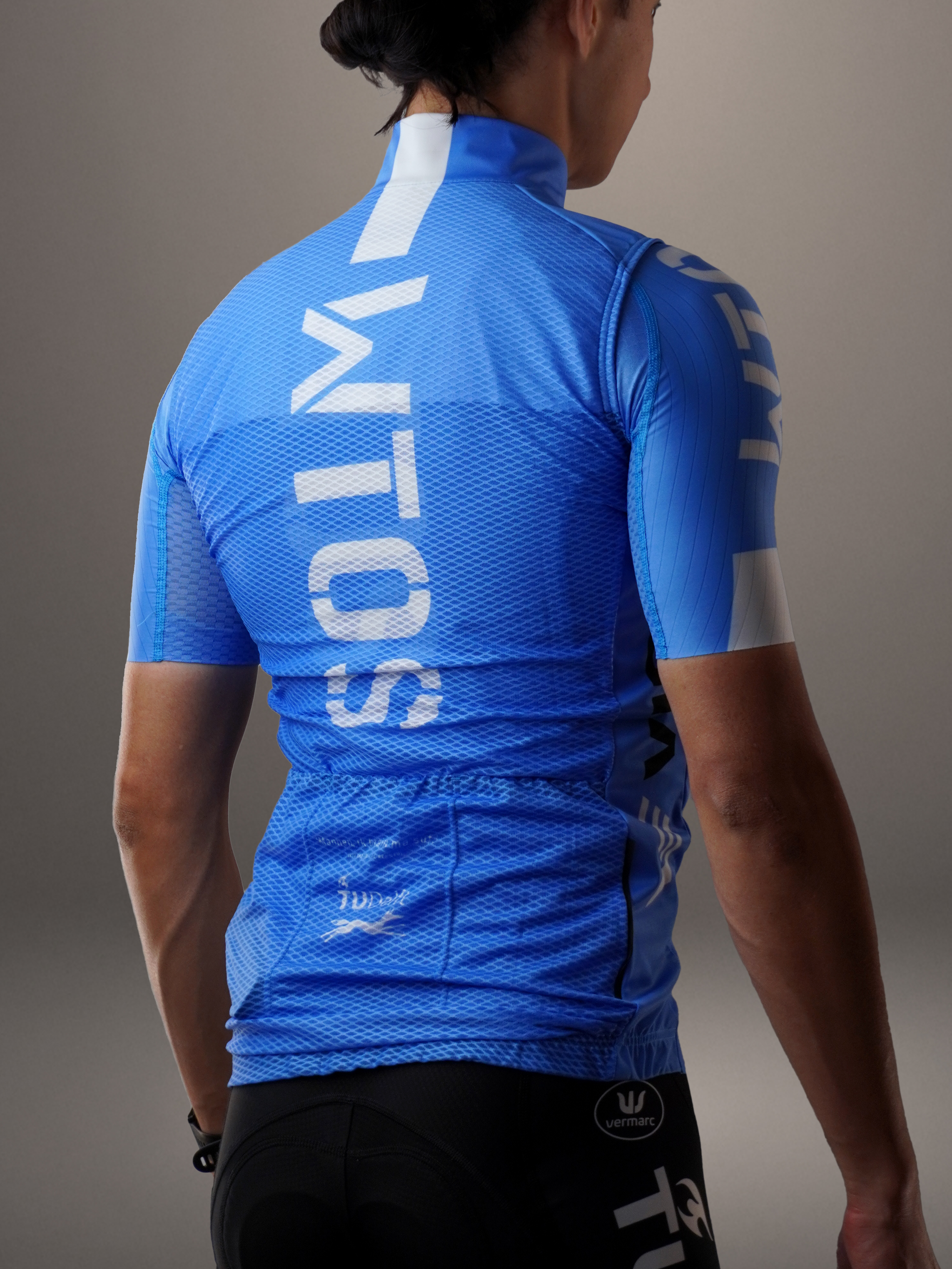
Mesh material makes up the rear of the gilet.

- Gilet: often thin and packable in the back pocket for colder or windy days
- Arm warmers: sleeves that can be worn separately
- Leg warmers: similar to leggings offering additional warmth
- Baselayer: worn beneath the jersey and the straps of the bib shorts for additional warmth

and in winter the additional pieces:

- Head warmer or cap: added protection from wind and rain, which may also cover the ears
- Neck warmer: protection for the neck, instead of a scarf (that may fall off)
- Jacket: jackets can be thin or insulated, windproof and/or waterproof for chilly days
- Bib tights instead of bib shorts and leg warmers: insulated/lined, full length versions of the bib shorts
- Booties (overshoes): neoprene or rubber shoe covers that keeps the shoes dry by preventing water ingress from sprays and/or rain

=== Accessories ===
The following optional pieces can be worn by the cyclist for additional comfort or performance monitoring:

- Casquette: traditional cycling cap with a short brim that can be worn under the helmet
- Sunglasses or transparent glasses: protects eyes from debris, flying bugs, wind, and UV rays (for tinted lenses), with transparent glasses commonly used in low-light conditions.
- Photochromic lenses: eyewear that automatically darkens in direct sunlight and becomes clear in shaded or low-light conditions.
- Heart rate monitor: which can be connected to and displayed on an activity tracker or a smartphone
- Gloves/mitts: offering additional grip and comfort and generally half finger in summer, full finger and/or insulated for winter

== Gallery ==
Example of a summer cycling kit.	Typical spring/autumn cycling attire comprises the summer kit with an additional insulated vest and arm warmers. Also worn is a pair of sunglasses resting on the helmet vents.	Typical winter cycling attire comprises head and neck warmers, gloves, jacket, bib tights and booties.

== See also ==
- Athletic bloomers
- Cycling costume
- Exercise dress
- Performance fabrics
- Road bicycle racing
- Road cycling
- Spandex
- Sportswear
