= Chamois (disambiguation) =

A chamois (Rupicapra rupicapra) is a species of goat-antelope native to Europe.

Chamois may also refer to:

- Chamois, Aosta Valley, a place in Italy
- Chamois, Missouri, a place in the United States
- Chamois leather
- In cycling, clothing items traditionally made with chamois leather:
  - Cycling shorts
  - Cycling pad
- Chamois Niortais FC, a football team
- Singer Chamois, a British car
- SS Chamois, a Panamanian steamship in service 1949-58

== See also ==
- Stage Manager (internally codenamed Chamois), a feature on iPadOS 16
- Chamoisee, a color found on some goats
- Chamoy (disambiguation)
- Shamwari, a game reserve in South Africa
