= Batting =

Batting may refer to:

- Batting (baseball), the act of attempting to hit a ball thrown by the pitcher with a baseball bat, in order to score runs
- Batting (cricket), the act of defending one's wicket with the cricket bat while attempting to score runs
- Padding, a layer of insulation between a top layer of patchwork and a layer of backing material in quilting
