= Padding =

Thin cushioned material in clothing

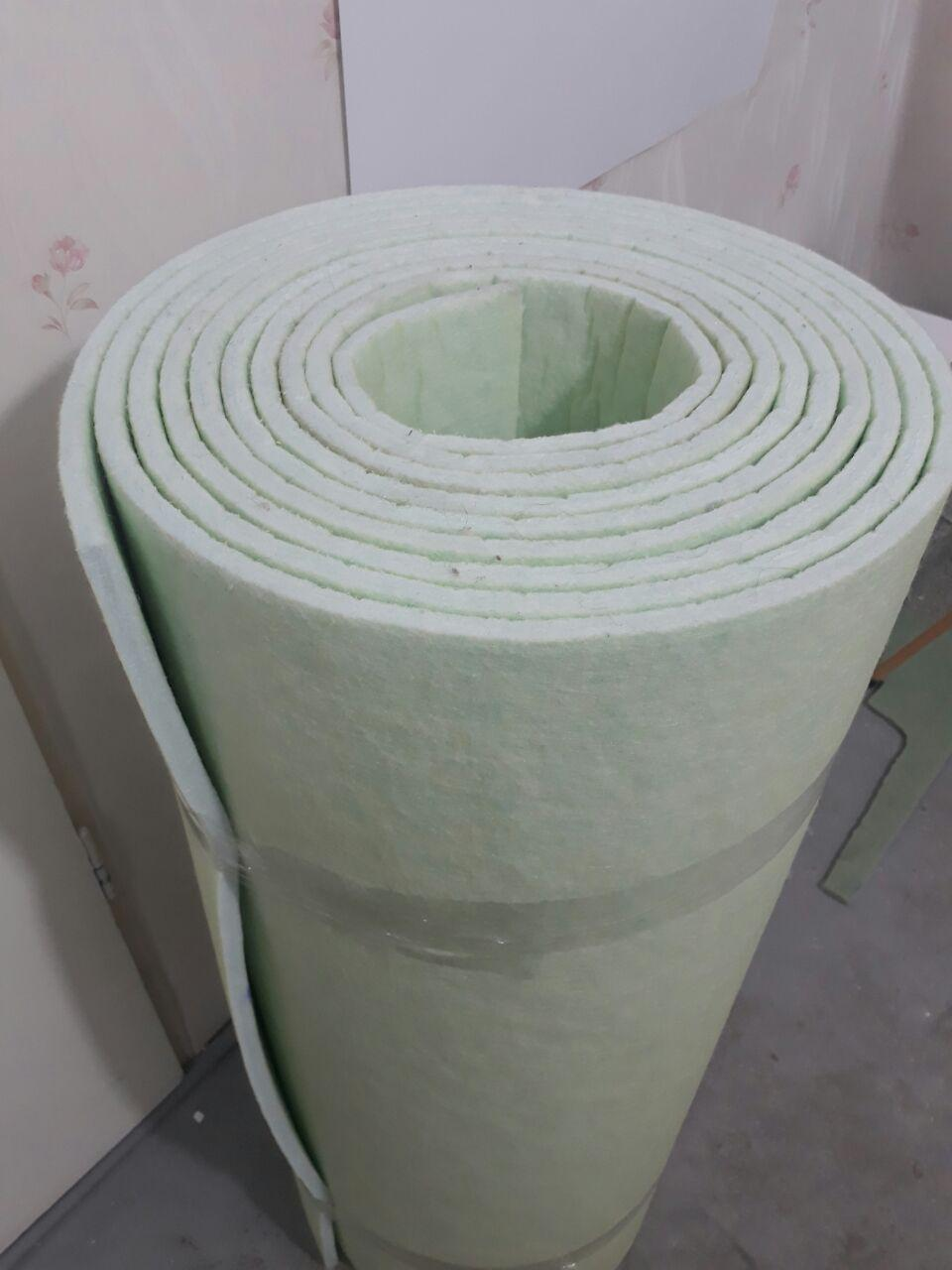
A roll of padding

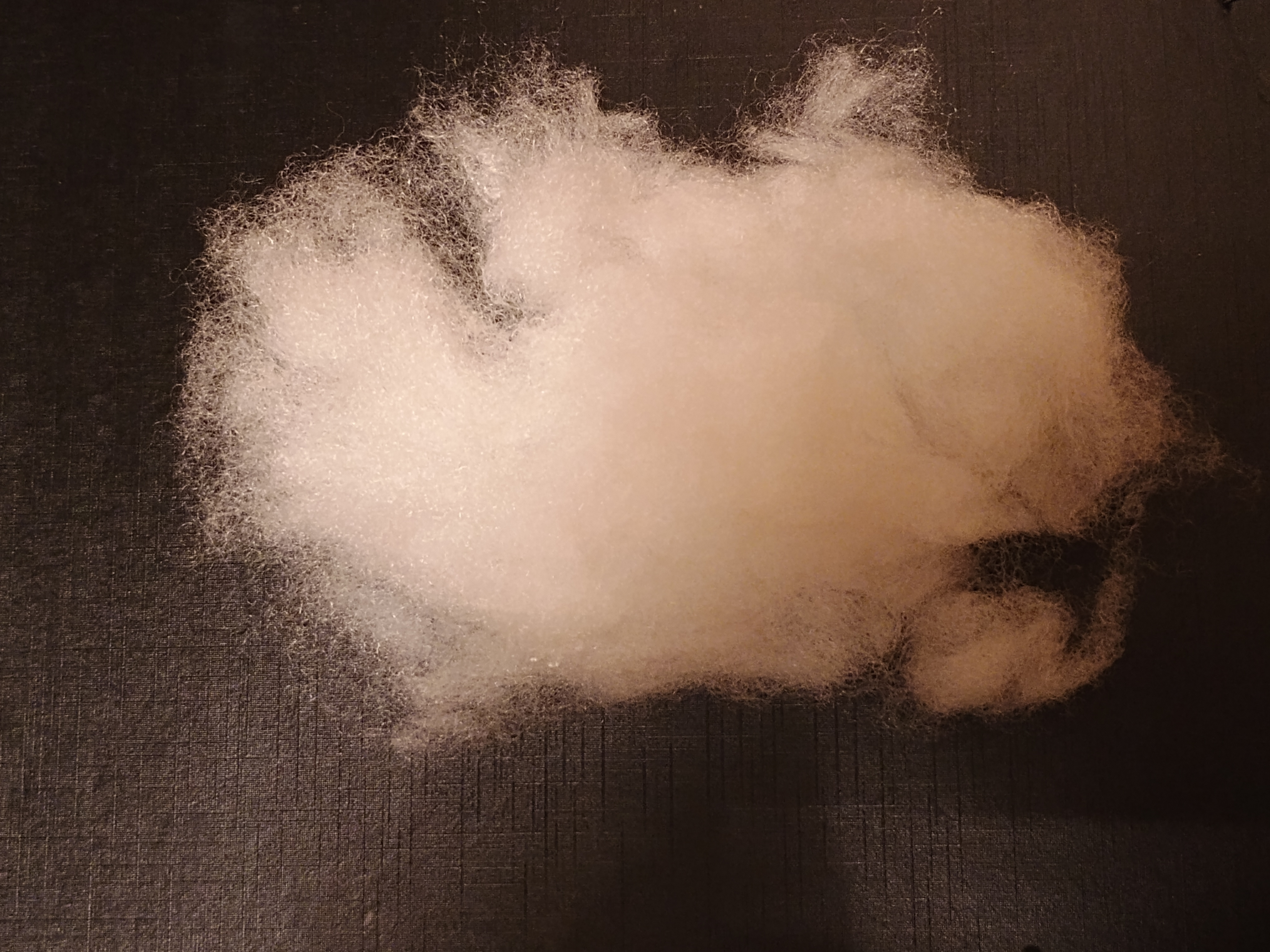
A wad of polyester fiberfill

Padding is thin cushioned material sometimes added to clothes. Padding may also be referred to as batting or wadding when used as a layer in lining quilts or as a packaging or stuffing material. When padding is used in clothes, it is often done in an attempt to soften impacts on certain zones of the body or enhance appearance by adding size to a physical feature. In fashion, there is padding for:

- Breasts – sometimes called falsies
- The male crotch – usually called a codpiece.
- Height – usually in shoes and often called elevator shoes
- Width of shoulders, called shoulder pads – in coats and other garments for men, and sometimes for women.

Bombast, consisting of horsehair, flock, bran, wool, rags, or cotton, was the padding used to give the required bulk to certain fashionable items of dress in Western Europe around 1600. It was used in particular for men's trunk hose, but also for women's trunk or cannon sleeves (1575–1620).

== To alter features ==
Some padding is added to emphasize particular physical features. Women, for instance, rarely have prominent shoulders, but for some years shoulder pads have been added to women's blazers, dresses (blouses, etc.). This gave them a more masculine outline which was sometimes thought to be of benefit in business situations. Many men's blazers also have a little padding in the shoulders, but not to the same extent.

Padding can also be used to alter the silhouette or appearance of the lower half of the body. This may include a form of padding in the shape of male genitals, or hip and buttock padding worn to appear curvier and create a stereotypically feminine hourglass silhouette.

== As protection ==
Padding is also added to clothing for insulation or cushioning reasons. Thus, many coats and outergarments (especially those for outdoor use in cold climates) are padded with such materials as felt or down or feathers or artificial insulations. Cushioning padding is included in some sporting goods, especially those intended for use in combat sports (e.g., fencing, some martial arts, etc.). Garments intended for actual use in combat were once commonly padded (e.g., by warriors in the Aztec Empire, by the ancient Greeks under armor, or by the Japanese until the mid-19th century), but have largely been replaced by light armor made of, for instance, Kevlar. If included in a vest, such armor makes a bullet-proof vest. Padding is also used by athletes in sports where friction is an issue, most notably in cycling shorts where it is termed a cycling pad.

Padding is used in some clothing and wearable equipment to provide cushioning, insulation, or protection from impact. In sportswear padded areas may help reduce the force transferred to the body during contact or falls. Rugby shoulder pads, for example, are designed to absorb and spread impact forces during play.

Protective padding can be made from foam, elastomeric materials, or engineered textile structures. These materials are used in wearable protective products such as knee protectors, elbow pads, shin guards, helmets, motorcycle jackets, and boxing gloves. Research on knee protectors has examined three-dimensional knitted padding as a possible alternative to conventional elastomeric padding, with attention to impact absorption, comfort, flexibility, and breathability.
