= Police bike =

Police bike may refer to:

- Police motorcycle
- Police bicycle
