= Compression garment =

Pieces of clothing that fit tightly around the skin

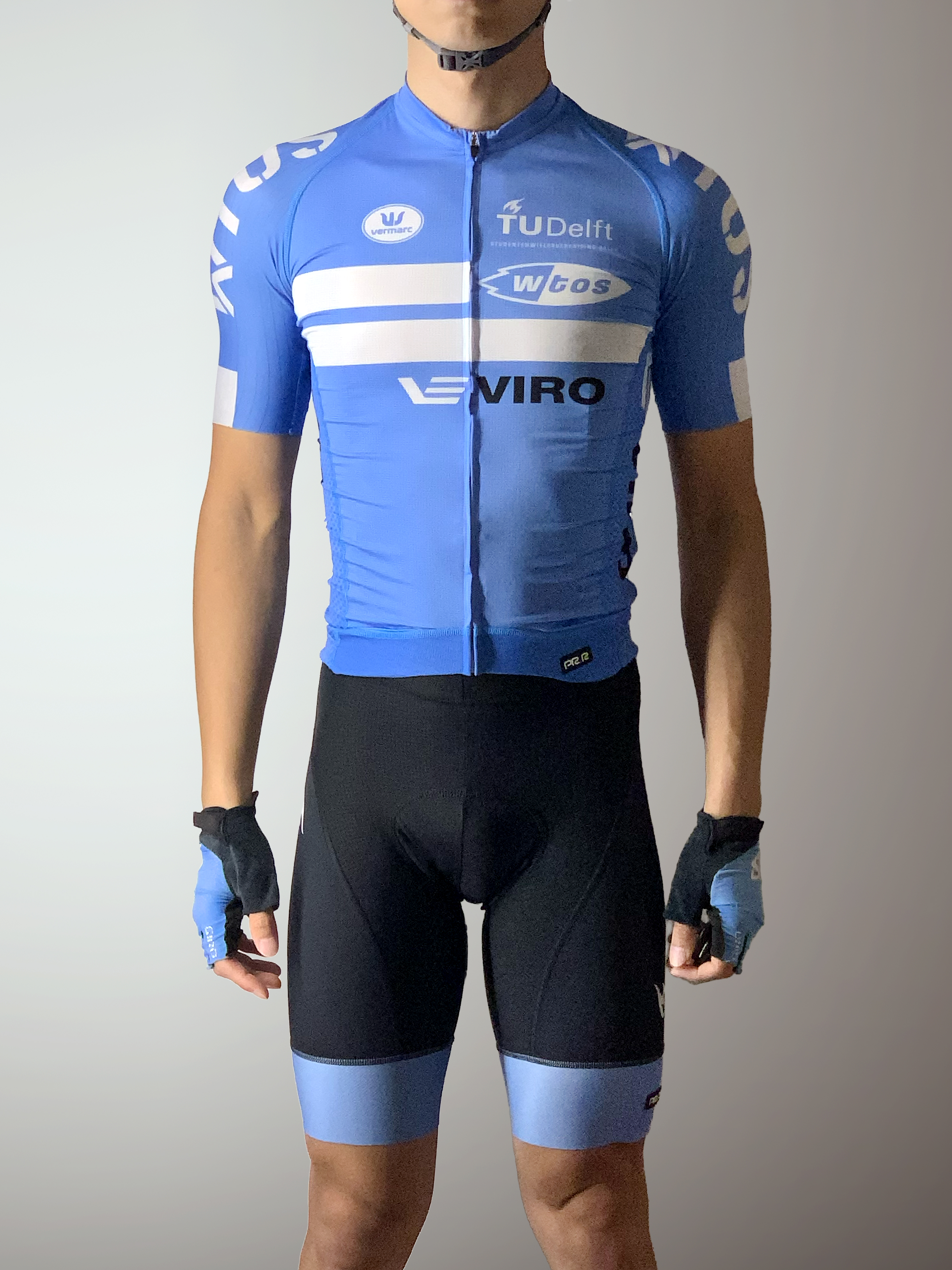
Elastic material used in the fabrics of a summer cycling attire comprising a jersey, bib shorts and gloves.

Compression garments are pieces of clothing that fit tightly around the skin. In medical contexts, compression garments provide support for people who have to stand for long periods or have poor circulation. These come in varying degrees of compression, and higher degree compression sleeves, such as sleeves that provide compression of 20–30 mmHg (2.7–4.0 kPa) or higher, typically require a doctor's prescription. Compression garments worn on the legs can help prevent deep vein thrombosis and reduce swelling, especially while traveling.

Compression can also be used for post surgeries, to help with the healing process. Garment usage varies per patient but can be worn up to a year. There are also second stage compression garments, that are every day wear.

In sports, form-fitting compression sportswear, usually made of spandex, is commonly worn by athletes and in exercise to prevent chafing and rashes.

== Medical use ==
=== Compression stockings and socks ===
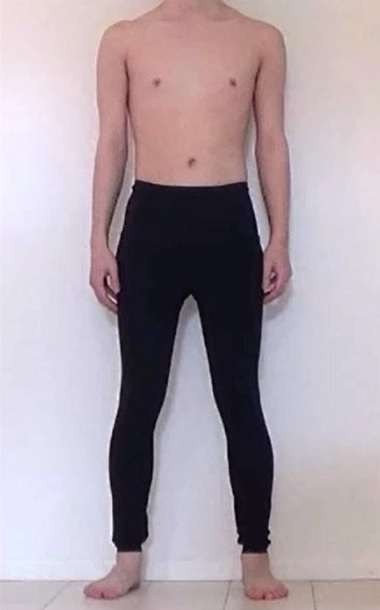
A man in compression tights

Compression stockings and socks are hosiery specifically designed to help prevent the occurrence of various medical disorders relating to blood circulation in the legs. They can also be used to halt the progression of these disorders.

=== Compression gloves ===
Compression gloves are handwear designed to help prevent the occurrence of various medical disorders relating to blood circulation in the wrists and hands. They can be used to treat the symptoms of arthritis, although a 2015 review found studies on efficacy were inconclusive.

=== Maternity wear ===
A bellyband, wrap, or abdominal binder is a compression garment which resembles a tubetop but worn over the abdomen of expectant mothers. Bellybands are also commonly worn post-childbirth to help provide abdominal and back support thereby making it easier to perform day to day tasks, and to help mothers with their posture.

=== Ventral hernia repair ===
Abdominal binders have been used after operations for ventral incisional hernia repair in the belief that this would decrease the risk of complications, such as seroma and surgical site infections, although there is little evidence for this practice. A 2024 meta-analysis showed lower rates of surgical site infection, pain, and better recovery for open surgical techniques; no conclusion was drawn for minimally invasive surgeries.

=== Gynecomastia vest ===
A compression vest or gynecomastia vest is a specialized compression garment for men with gynecomastia, a condition characterized by the development of breast tissues in males. The estimates of those with the condition are presented as a range "because the definition of gynecomastia varies and the method of surveying varies." Although there are options for treating gynecomastia, some individuals opt to wear a breast compression garment as a non-surgical alternative for compressing the breast.

== Sportswear ==
Compression garments are widely used in endurance sports such as triathlon, where athletes must balance performance, comfort, and equipment requirements across different disciplines. In addition to supporting the muscles, such clothing is often chosen to facilitate transitions between swimming, cycling, and running. In triathlon, equipment should provide support and compression without restricting movement, and should allow you to put on a wetsuit without adding extra bulk. A snug-fitting suit can improve comfort and performance.

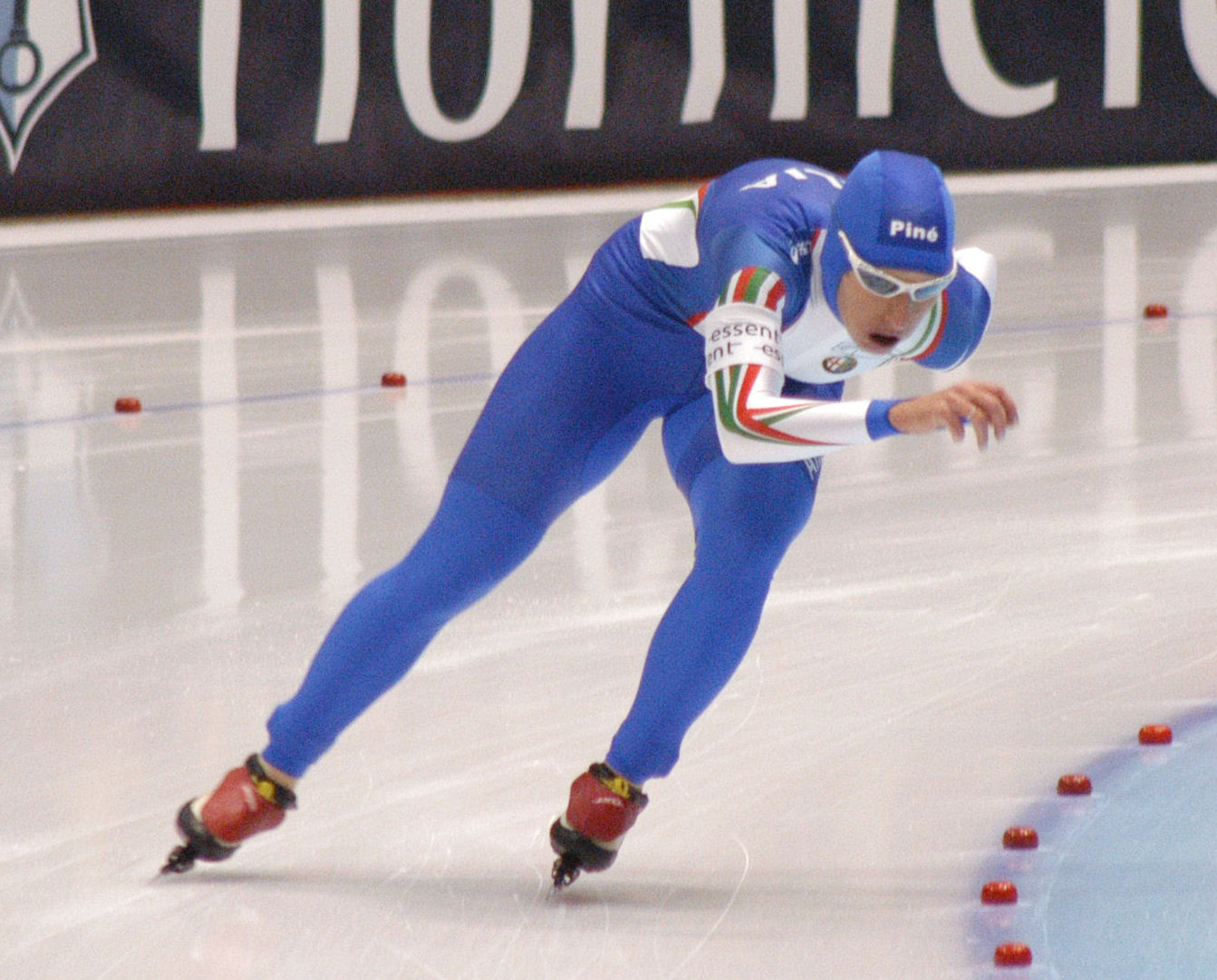
Speed-skater Chiara Simionato in a bodysuit

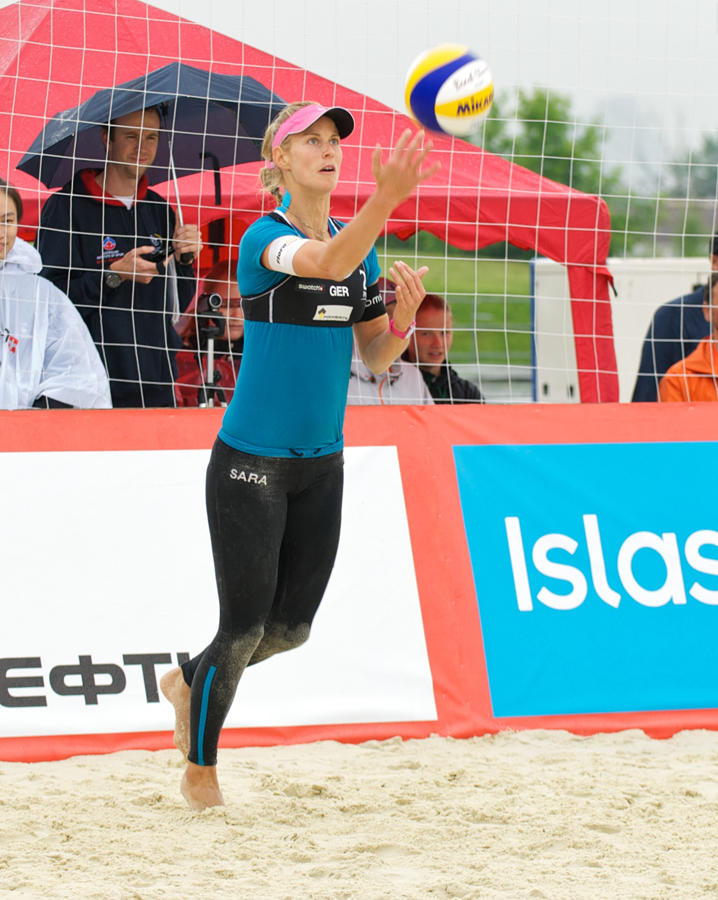
Beach volleyball player Sara Goller in tights

=== Benefits ===
Depending on the material used and the requirements of the sport, compression garments can be designed to keep athletes cool or warm. For example, speedskaters can wear compression bodysuits on the cold rink, while beach volleyball players can wear a similar-looking suit made of a more breathable, lightweight blend. Both use moisture wicking materials like nylon and spandex in order to keep the garment lightweight. Additionally, speed skaters can use the aerodynamic nature of wearing a skintight suit to their advantage, while a beach volleyball player has the added benefit of SPF 50+ garments to keep them protected during sunny days. The athletes pictured show some alleged benefits that make compression garments popular in a wide range of sports and different designs.

=== Performance ===
Although there are strong claims that compression garments could improve sports performance, methodological approaches and the direction of evidence regarding garments for use in high-intensity exercise settings are diverse and in certain scenarios do not show clear positive evidence.

A 2018 meta-analysis found that lower-limb compression garments were not associated with improved running performance, vertical jump, VO2max, VO2submax, lactate concentration, or rating of perceived exertion during high-intensity exercise.

=== Shorts and tights ===
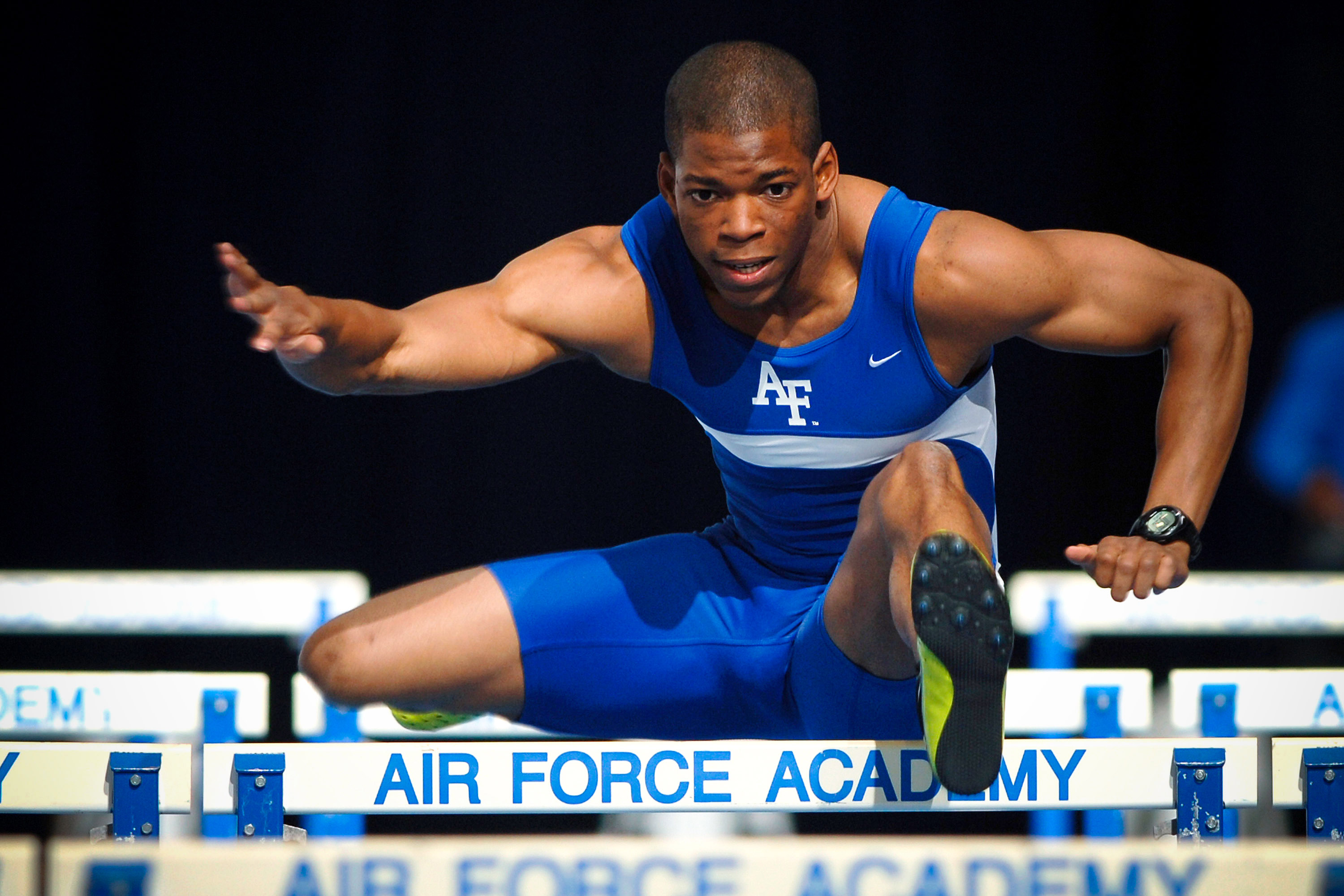
United States Air Force Academy hurdler in full compression uniform

Compression shorts and tights are usually worn by athletes. They are form-fitting garments and cover the wearer's waist to mid or lower thigh, similar to cycling shorts. They are referred to as spats in Japan and safety shorts in South Korea.

Many are available with a cup pocket, a sewn-in pocket that can hold a protective cup. Compression shorts are also popular among female athletes, especially amongst those who wear skirts or kilts during games. In those situations, athletes wear compression shorts under the skirt so if they fall over and their skirts ride up, their underwear will not be exposed. This is seen particularly in women's lacrosse and field hockey (both being limited contact sports in which players often wear skirts). Women also wear compression shorts in tennis, where, most recently, compression shorts have been produced with ball pockets for convenience.

== See also ==
- Rugby shorts
- Skin-tight garment
- Sports clothing
- Military anti-shock trousers
