= List of dancewear =

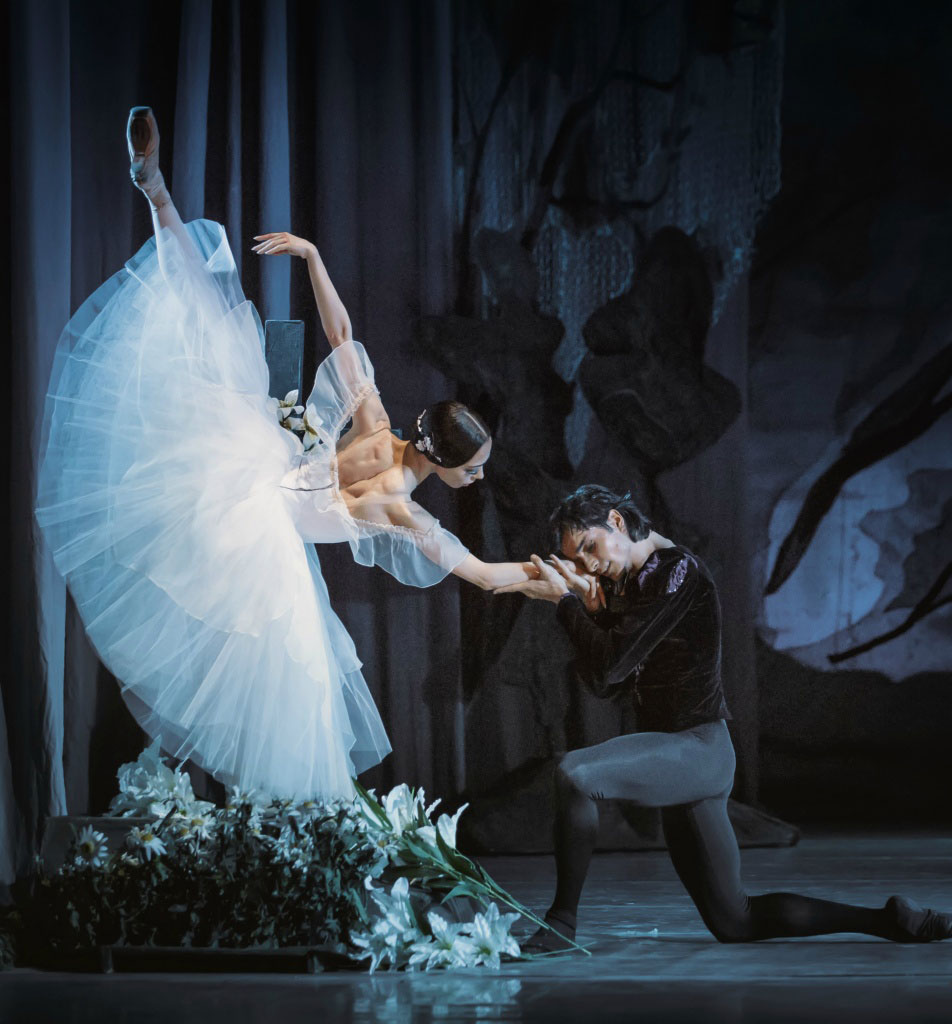
A dancer wearing a Romantic tutu in a scene from Giselle

Dancewear is clothing commonly worn by dancers. Items of dancewear include:

- arm warmers
- dance belts
- dance shoes
- legwarmers
- leotards and unitards
- pointe shoes
- skirts
- tights
- tutus

== See also ==
- Dance costume
- Sportswear
