= Chamoy =

Chamoy may refer to:

- Chamoy (sauce), a Mexican condiment
- Chamoy, Aube, France
- Chamoy Thipyaso (born 1940), Thai prisoner

== See also ==
- Chamois (disambiguation)
