= Cycling shoe =

Shoes designed for riding a bicycle

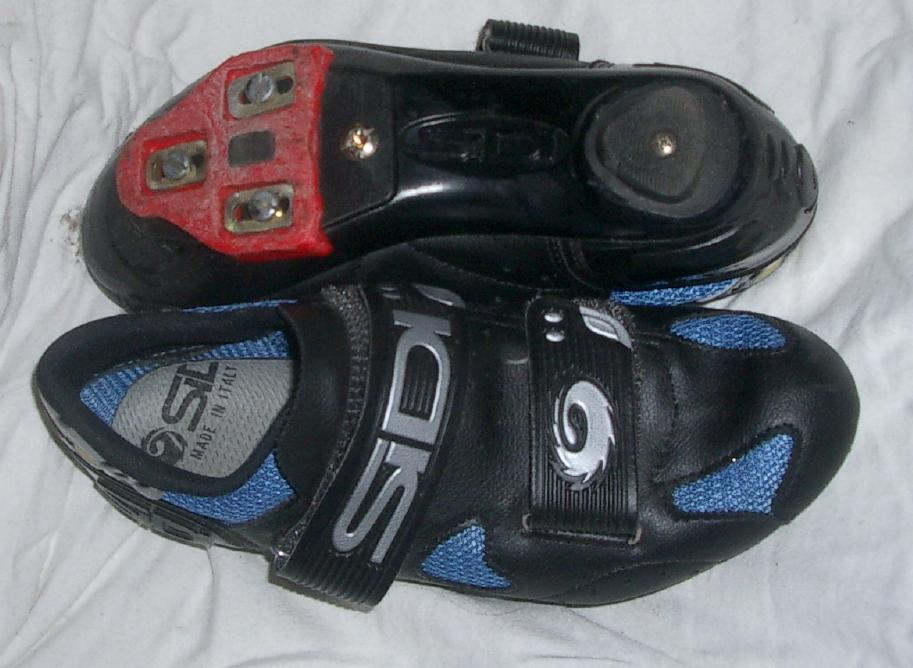
Sidi women's road cycling shoe using three-bolt cleat

Cycling shoes are shoes purpose-built for cycling. There are a variety of designs depending on the type and intensity of the cycling for which they are intended. Key features include rigidity, for more-efficient transfer of power from the cyclist to the pedals, weight, a method of attaching the shoe firmly to the pedal and adaptability for use on and off the bicycle. Most high-performance cycling shoes can be adjusted while in use, via a quick-adjusting system that has largely replaced laces.

== Pedal systems ==
Modern cycling shoes are designed to work with clipless pedal systems. Such systems temporarily connect the shoe to the pedal in a manner similar to a ski binding system. The aim is maximal efficiency of power-transfer, using a cleat on the sole of each shoe and a matched fitting on the pedal. Several manufacturers produce such systems; consequently, modern shoes often have threaded holes in the sole in various arrangements to attach cleats of differing designs from different manufacturers.

Broadly there are two styles of clipless pedals, still referred to as “road” and “MTB” (mountain bike). Road pedals use a wide cleat, usually of hard plastic, which makes walking difficult (or, without care, hazardous) but gives good power transfer and is comfortable on long rides. A mountain-bike-style shoe uses a small steel cleat recessed into the sole of the shoe. It enables reasonable walking or running when dismounted.

The toe-clip and toestrap is an older system, still much used in one format. A toeclip is a metal cage attached to the front of the pedal into which the rider inserts the shoe. There are two methods for using pedals with toeclips. The first is a cycling shoe with a slotted shoeplate. Before the introduction of the clipless pedal, most racing shoes had a hard leather or plastic sole to which a metal or plastic shoe plate or cleat was attached. The shoeplate had a slot that fitted into the pedal. The shoeplate along with toeclip and strap keep the rider's feet firmly attached to the pedals. The drawback - a serious inconvenience in stop-start cycling - is that the rider has to reach down and loosen the toestrap by hand to take a foot out of the toeclip and off the pedal and for this reason toeclips with slotted shoe plates have been made largely obsolete by clipless pedals. The second method, still widely used, is to use a cycling shoe with a smooth sole or even a suitable non-cycling shoe. This had the disadvantage that the rider's feet are not firmly attached to the pedals (while nonetheless being constrained and supported) but had the advantage of allowing the shoe to slide backwards out from the toeclip and away from the pedals from the pedals without having to loosen the strap by hand. Some non-cycling shoes can be used, if compact enough to fit into the cage of the toeclip.

== Sole material and shoe quality ==
Soles for cycling shoes are usually divided into three categories. Inexpensive shoes mostly use an injection-molded plastic sole, which is economical but heavier and prone to flexing. Mid-range shoes may use a combination of plastic and carbon fibre, plastic and fibreglass, or an all carbon-fibre sole. All manufacturers' high-end competition level shoes manufactured post-2002 use carbon fibre soles. The sole material and amount of shoe tread used in a shoe affects its weight; an expensive pair of road shoes with carbon fibre soles can weigh as little as 400 grams, while a budget-priced pair of mountain bike shoes might weigh 850 to 900 grams.

Some mountain bike shoes have a little engineered frontal flex in the toe area forward of the cleat mount, and may carry a couple of studs, as used on the sole of football boots. This assists in walking and in climbing obstacles while carrying the bike. More expensive shoes usually have less frontal flex.

== Variety ==
Cycling shoes come in numerous variants: road racing, track racing, winter, casual cycling, touring, off-road or mountain biking, and indoor cycling or spinning. Though many cycling shoe suppliers will have a conversion to American, British, French or even Japanese sizing, most cycling shoes are measured in European sizing. The available sizes range from European 35 to as large as 52. A few cycling shoe suppliers offer selected models wider than the standard "D" width. A small number of custom cycling shoe makers will tailor a shoe to a cyclist's exact foot size and shape.

=== Road ===
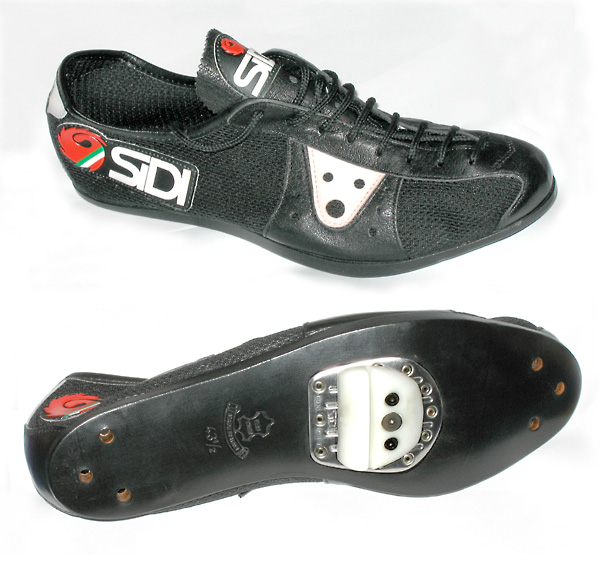
1980s cycling shoe with leather and nylon mesh uppers, leather sole, and adjustable shoeplate, for use with “quill” pedals

These have a mostly smooth, rigid and inflexible sole, bent slightly at the ball of the foot. This, and the cleat attached to the shoe bottom, make a clicking sound when they come together and results in the waddle of the walking cyclist. These shoes are designed to function while the user is on the bike and little attention is paid to off-bike use. Most road shoes have a raised and generally different material from the outsole at the toe and heel to make stopping and short walks a little easier. Some road shoe outsoles have additional holes which are claimed to assist in ventilation. Quality can be measured by the shoe's fit, rigidity, durability, construction quality and lightness. Road shoes have molded holes with threaded inserts inside to allow for the attachment of an external cleat. Many cycling shoes use a three-hole system for attaching the cleat which is sometimes called a "Look pattern" after the company that popularized the clipless pedal in the middle 1980s. Lake, DMT and Sidi now offer a purpose designed, Speedplay pedal compatible shoe. These cleats attach to a clipless pedal making them even more unsuitable for walking. The 2010 price range for a road cycling shoe in the US is from $70 to over $450. Sizes available range from 35 to 52, with most companies offering sizes ranging from 39 to 46. Most companies offer models in European half sizes in the middle and largest selling size range, and a rare few offer shoes in wider than "D" width in limited models.

=== Triathlon ===
Triathlon-specific shoes are usually a variant of road shoes. The key features include: quick foot entry and exit, sockless, and good drainage. During a triathlon, the athlete needs to change quickly from the swim to bike phase and from bike to run phase. At competitive levels, there is no time for socks or fiddly buckles. The shoes are usually pre-clipped to the pedals and feet are inserted after mounting the bike. The shoes often have a single big velcro fastening as opposed to laces or 3 velcro/ratchet straps.

=== Track ===
Velodrome or track racing is popular in the UK, Australia, parts of the US and the traditional cycling countries of Europe. Companies have developed track-specific shoes to address the very specialized needs of the track racer. These shoes tend to be simple and traditional with lace closures for best fit with pedal straps; they frequently use the lightest and most rigid materials. The point is to allow the rider to apply full force to the pedals without worrying about the shoes stretching, coming off or coming unclipped. Keirin riders, sprinters, and track time trial riders and some others prefer a track-specific shoe to a standard cycling shoe. Track-specific models are offered by relatively small number of manufacturers such as Riivo, Bont, DMT, Suplest (though named as road), and EZNI.

=== Touring ===
The traditional cycling tourist usually used toe clips and straps, but touring shoes designed for use with clipless pedals are now also common, usually with a recessed cleat so that the rider can both walk and cycle effectively. Touring shoes may sacrifice some rigidity for traction and add treads.

=== Casual ===
This type of shoe generally has a soft outsole (as compared with a road shoe) and a molded internal midsole. They are shaped more like a street or trail shoe with a less exaggerated "rocker" allowing a more normal gait. The outsole usually has a lugged pattern which is like a day hiking boot and is a compromise between an aggressive off-road shoe and an old-style touring shoe. These shoes have a molded midsole which protects the rider's foot from the pedal and transfers energy more evenly without a pressure point at the exact shoe/pedal contact points. It also allows for the attachment of a clipless pedal cleat and can be walked in more-or-less normally. There is almost always a rectangular cutout in the outsole where a piece of the outsole material is removed by the purchaser or bicycle store, under which is the midsole and two oval slots where the cleats are bolted on. Most of these cleats follow Shimano's "SPD" system (“Shimano Pedal Dynamics”). Other two-bolt cleat and pedal systems for use with casual cycling and MTB shoes are produced by Crank Brothers, Speedplay and Ritchey, to name a few. Casual cycling shoes normally have a US retail price of under $100. Sizes range from 35 to 50 in European sizing.

=== Sandals ===
Usually a subcategory of casual, sandals follow Shimano's "SPD" system. Manufacturers include Keen, Shimano, and Nashbar.

=== Mountain bike ===
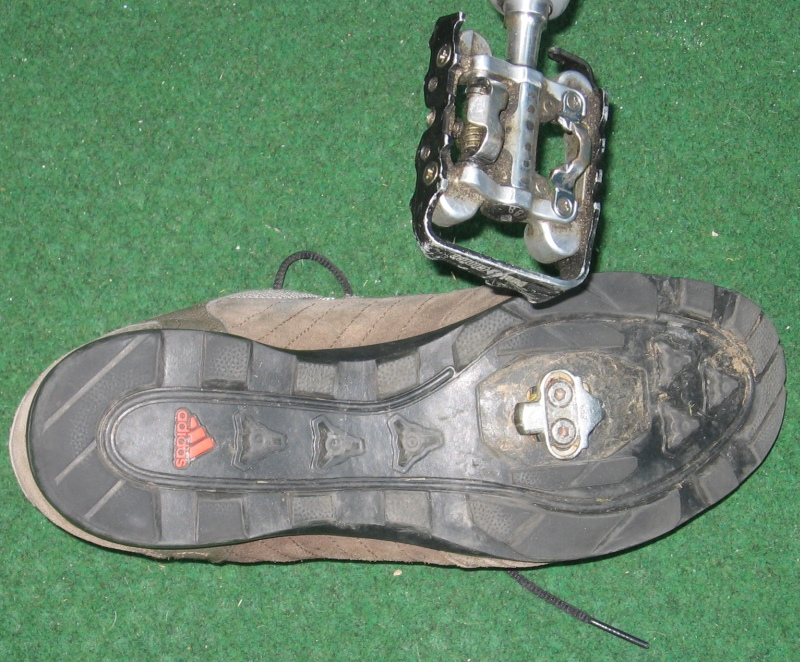
Adidas mountain cycling shoe using two-bolt SPD-style cleat for clipless pedal

These shoes also use the two-slot cleat mounting system like casual cycling shoes but have a more aggressive, lugged outsole for better performance when the rider has to get off the bike to run or to push or carry the bike. Most of these shoes allow for attachment of two screw-in studs or spikes in the toe area for more traction in mud or steep trails. The cleats used on mountain bike shoes are also depressed below the treads of the sole, keeping them from contact with the ground. Injection-molded nylon midsoles reinforced with fiberglass, carbon fiber-reinforced injection molded nylon and hand-laid carbon fiber midsoles can be found, depending on manufacturer and price range. Prices in the US in 2010 range from $70 to well over $350 for the most expensive models. Sizes are available from 35 to 50, with some companies offering a wider model or two.

=== Indoor ===
Often called Spinning shoes, after the company that popularized fitness club classes led by an instructor using stationary bicycles. A few companies have developed shoe models intended to cater to the indoor cyclist, including Nike, Lake, SIDI, Specialized, Exustar and others. These shoes have not been widely accepted due to their limited availability and a fragmented consumer market. US retail prices as of 2010 are generally under $90, with the normal range of sizes available.

=== Winter ===
Cycling shoes with insulated, over-ankle coverage have been available for a number of years from Lake, Sidi, Northwave, Exustar, Gaerne and others. Some of these companies offer both road and off-road versions of their shoes, and some offer more than one model, with varying degrees of protection from cold, wind and moisture. Lake shoes have been used by riders who have won the Iditabike, which is an extreme adventure race in Alaska.

== Overshoes ==
Overshoes (or "booties") are flexible waterproof shoe coverings for use in wet weather. They are typically made from rubber or a stretchy synthetic and have a zip on the inside of the ankle. The fabric continues under the sole but is not intended for walking on, which would wear it out quickly. Most overshoes have a hole in the sole for clipless pedals. Overshoes are not to be confused with cleat covers. Overshoes go on the top of the shoes, while cleat covers go on the bottom.

== See also ==
- Cycling kit
- List of shoe styles
- List of bicycle part manufacturing companies
