= Northwave =

Italian sporting equipment manufacturer

Northwave s.r.l.
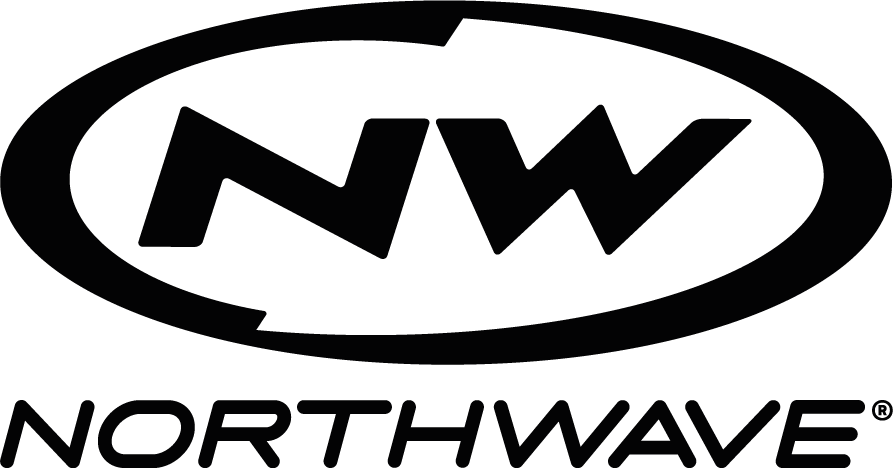
- Company type: Private
- Industry: Cycling; Snowboard
- Founded: 1991; 35 years ago in Montebelluna
- Founder: Gianni Piva
- Headquarters: Pederobba, Italy
- Brands: Northwave; Drake Snowboard
- Website: www.northwave.com

Northwave is a sporting equipment manufacturer founded in Montebelluna, Italy, by Gianni Piva and owned by the Piva family.

== History ==
The company began as a shoe manufacturer in the early 1980's, producing shoes for other businesses. In the late 1980s, while snowboarding was still developing, Piva started manufacturing snowboard boots for other snowboard companies. Piva later developed his brand of boots, Northwave.

== Acquisitions ==
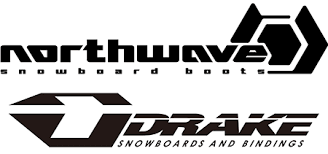
Northwave boots and Drake Snowboard logos

Piva named the company Northwave, which originally stemmed from a wind surfing company in Hood River, Oregon, United States.

In 1991 Northwave came out with its line of snowboard boots. In 1997, Northwave acquired Drake Bindings, a company they believed had quality products, but struggled to distribute them.

In 1998 Bakoda Design Logic snowboard accessories were added to the company. Bakoda was originally started in the early 1990s by the Royes brothers. Northwave bought the company, leaving the brand with its originally established name.

== Snowboards and cycling shoes ==
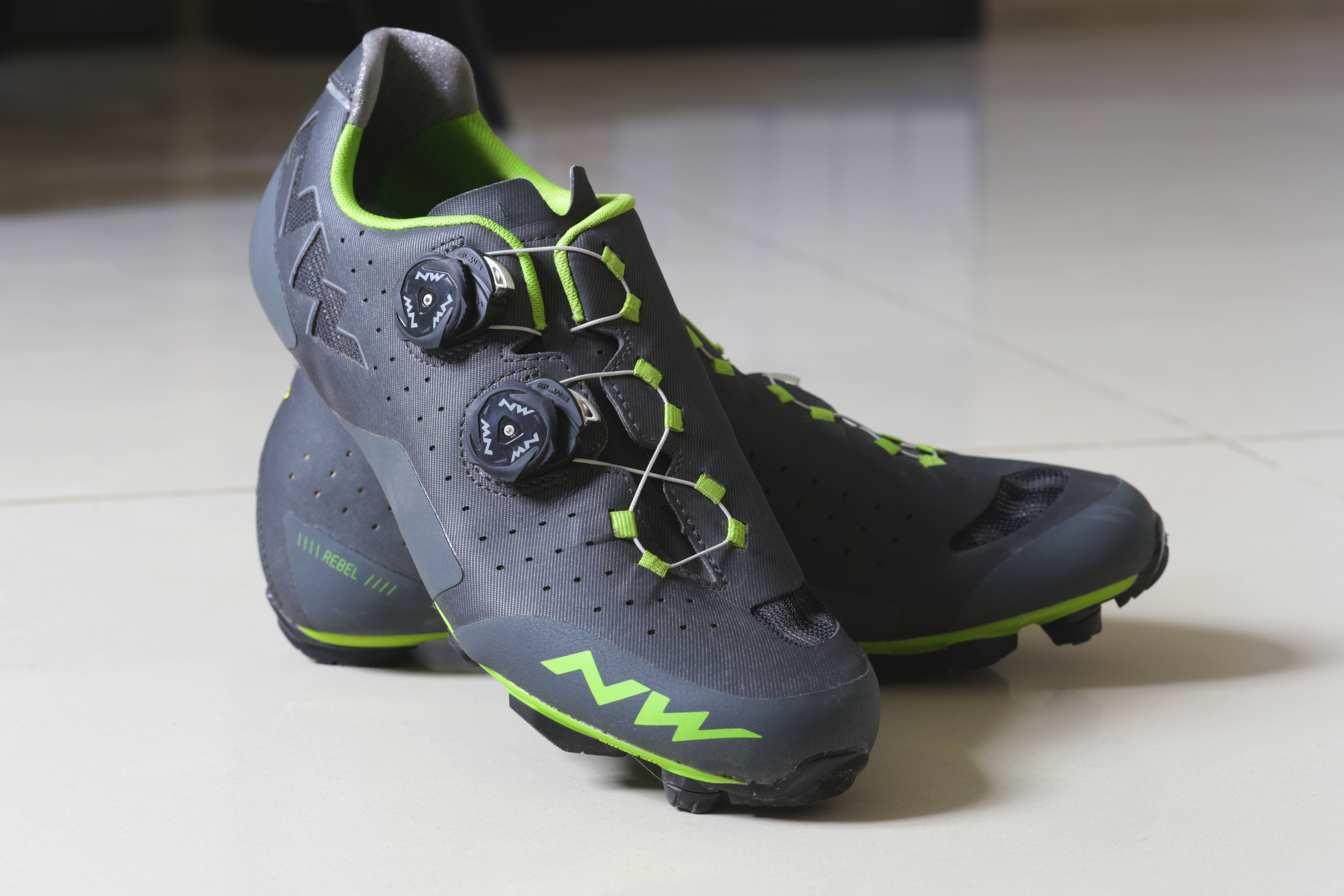
Northwave Rebel MTB 2018 Shoes

Gianni Piva had wanted to add snowboards to his company for many years, and after over 10 years of being in the snowboard industry, Northwave started Venue snowboards.

Due to such high success in the action sports industry, Piva decided to develop cycling shoes, and in 1993, Northwave began the production of them.

== See also ==
- Sportswear (activewear)
