= Paul Grady =

American police officer

Paul Grady is a police officer. He is known for establishing a police bicycle program in Seattle. He is also known for speaking out about being LGBT and a police officer.

The International Police Mountain Bike Association credits Seattle for starting the police bike program. The start was when Seattle police officers Paul Grady and Mike Miller patrolled on their mountain bikes in July 1987.

The program in Seattle was quickly successful.

Grady gave bike training to police in Florida in 1991.

In 1993 Grady resigned from the Seattle police force due to LGBT harassment. He described that other officers left information about AIDS in his workspace in a hostile way. He was one of the undercover police who investigated the gay Monastery church and disco, but police officers ridiculed him for being gay and doing gay-related police work. He was reprimanded for testifying to the state about hate crimes against LGBT people because police are supposed to follow rules for neutrality. At the time he quit there were no other LGBT police officers in Seattle out, and he recommended that none come out or they will be harassed.
