= Police bicycle =

Bicycle used by police

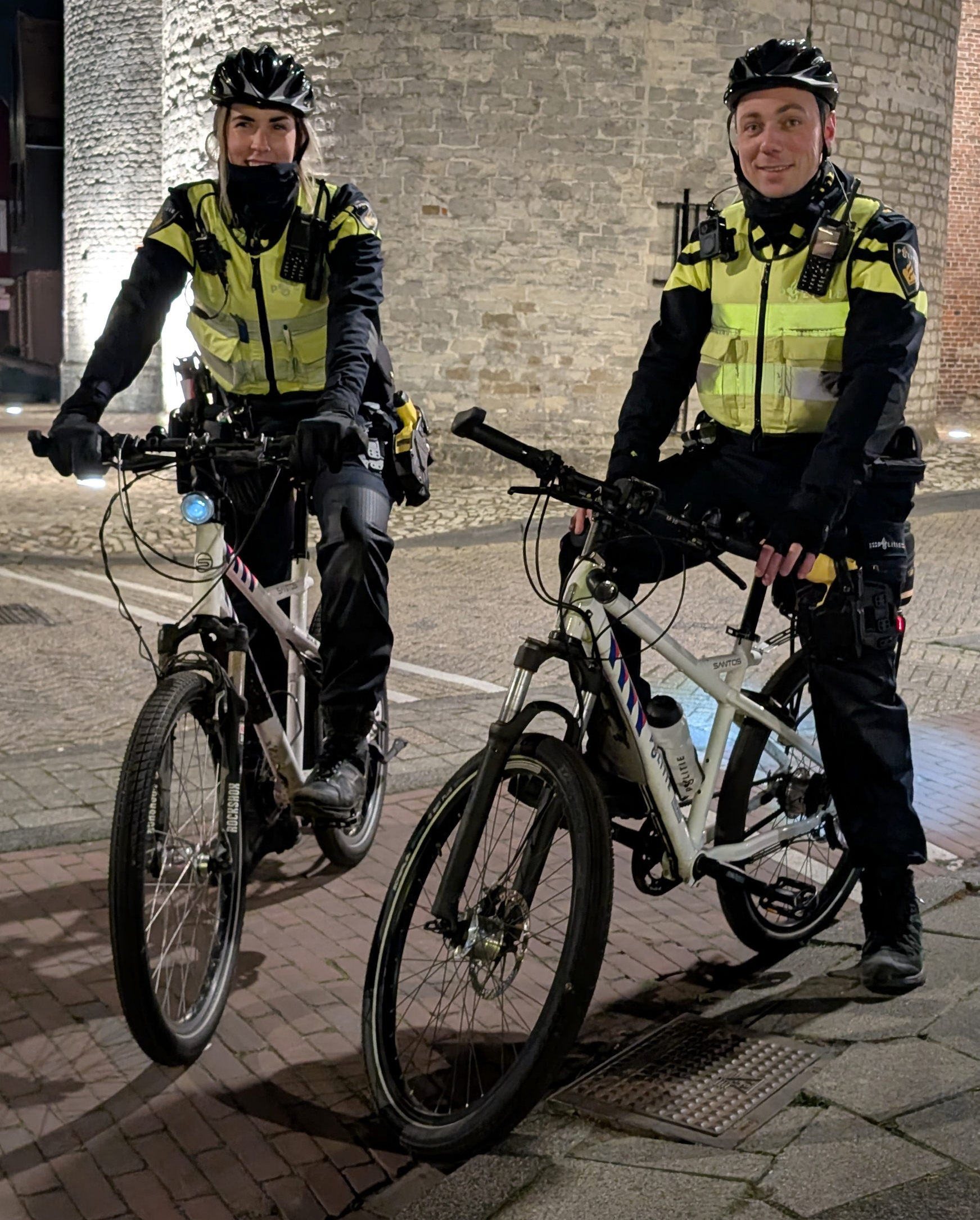
Two Dutch police officers on bicycles with police livery

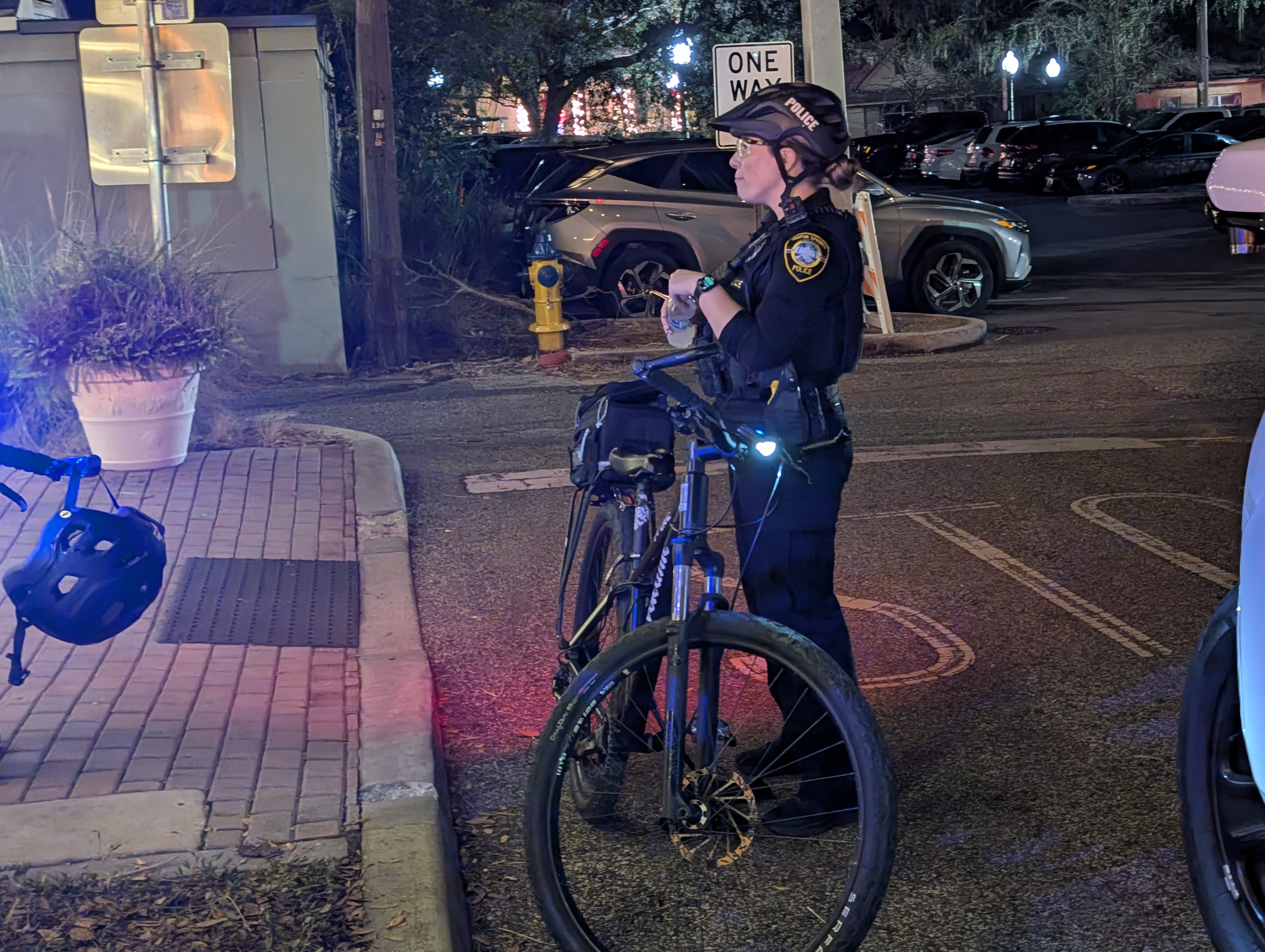
An officer of the Tarpon Springs, Florida Police Department on bicycle patrol

A police bicycle is a bicycle used by police forces, most commonly in the form of a mountain bicycle, used to patrol areas inaccessible to police cars or cover a wider area than an officer on foot.

Bicycle patrols are often assigned to locations that police cars cannot access and that officers could not effectively cover on foot, such as dense urban areas, pedestrian zones, and public parks. The maneuverability of bicycles and their ability to navigate narrow and densely-packed areas easily and quickly offer advantages over police cars, though bicycles are slower than police cars, carry less equipment, and cannot be used to effectively enforce road laws, though they may still conduct traffic stops if possible; for example, a video of a Japanese bicycle officer stopping a Lamborghini Huracán, despite the massive speed difference between them, went viral in 2017.

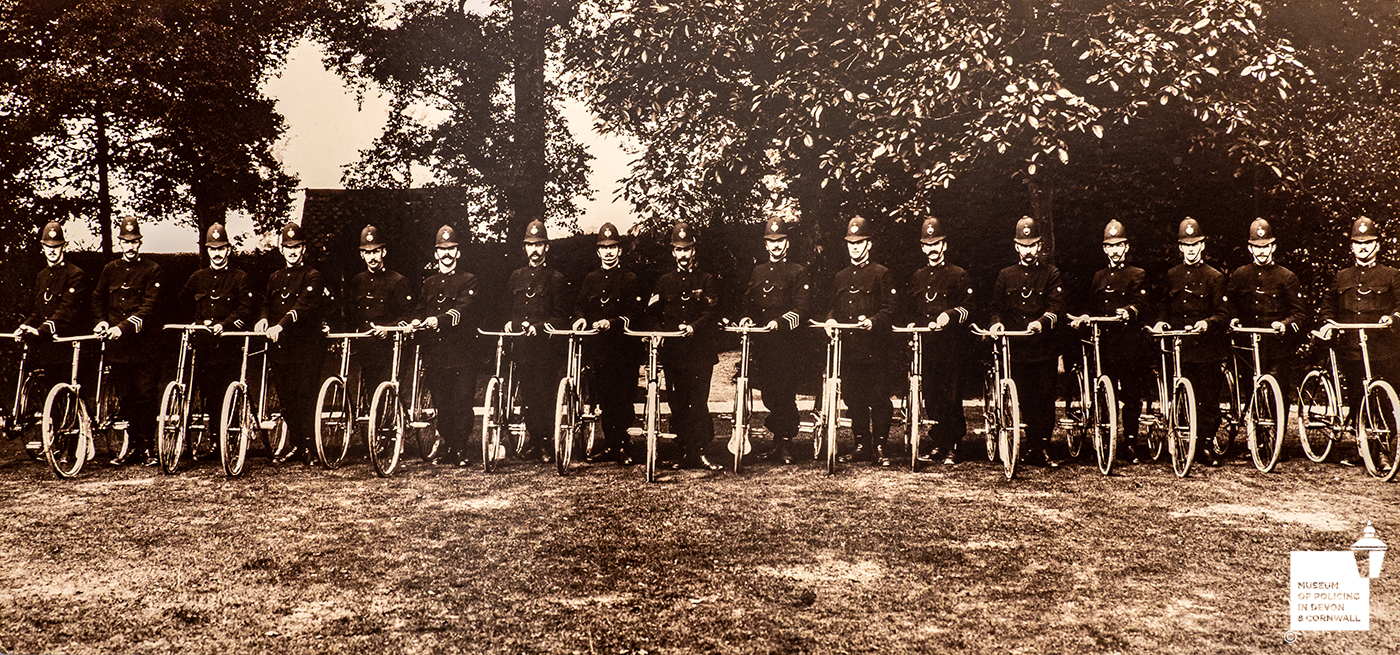
Seventeen Cornish police officers of various ranks with their bikes in, 1913

== History ==
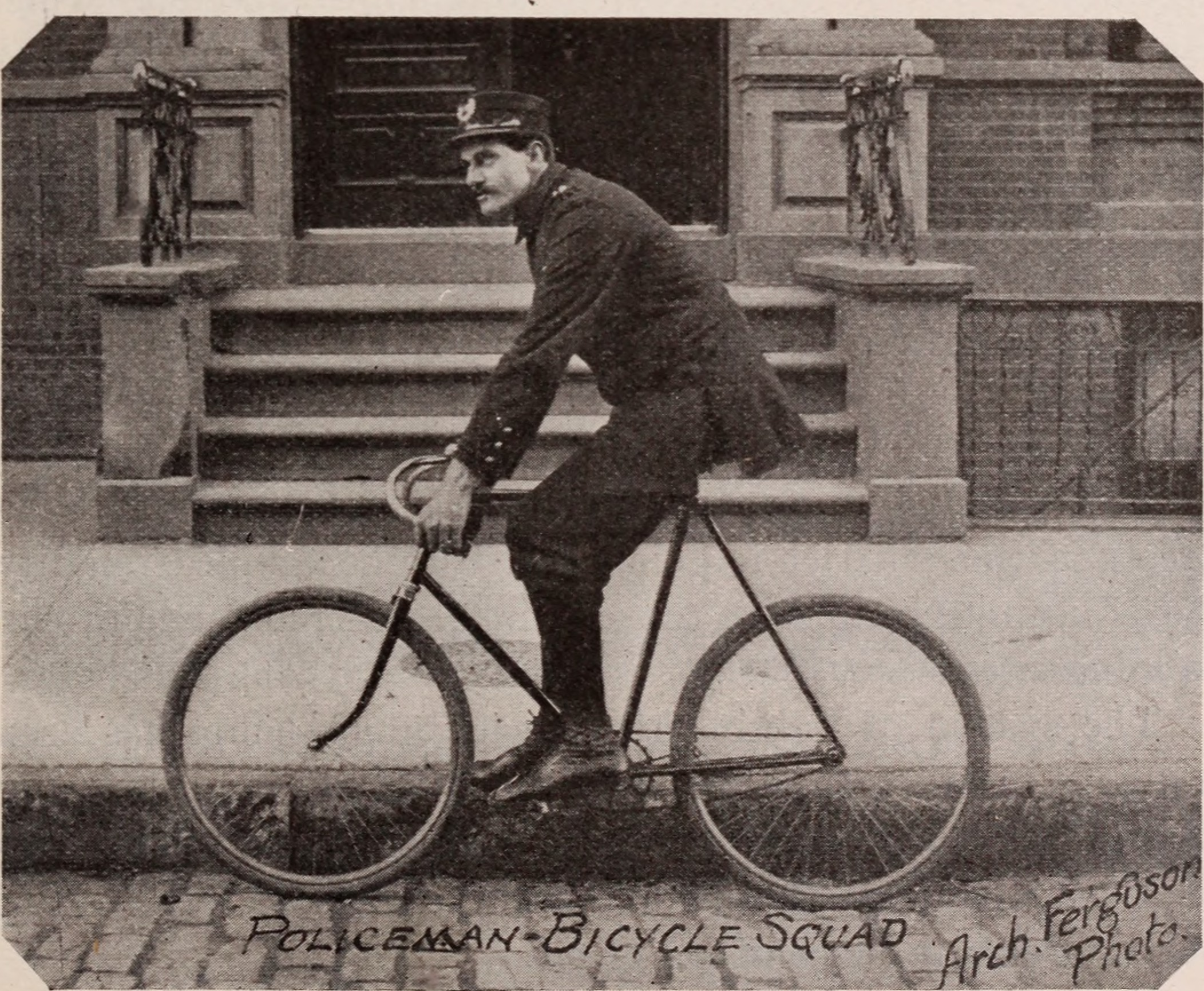
Bicycle-mounted NYPD officer in the 1890s

Bicycles were first used by police in the 19th century, with the first department adopting boneshakers in 1869 in Illinois. British officers began using tricycles by the 1880s, around the same time, Boston, MA was patrolled by penny-farthings. Newark, NJ had established a bicycle squad in 1888. With the advent of the safety bicycle and the bike boom of the 1890s, police bicycles came into widespread use in North American cities. Bicycles began to see greater adoption by rural departments around the same time. The Kent police purchased 20 bicycles in 1896, and there were 129 rural police bicycle patrols were operating by 1904.

As the ubiquity of automobiles, roads, and traffic offenses grew, many police forces retired their bicycle units in favor of motorized police vehicles, though some forces retained their bicycle units. In the 1980s Paul Grady introduced patrols on mountain bikes in Seattle. The idea spread and by 1991 there were enough programs to create the International Police Mountain Bike Association. In the 21st century, an increase in pedestrian zones, efforts toward community policing, and the appeal of reducing ecological footprints renewed interest in police bicycles.

== Bicycle characteristics ==
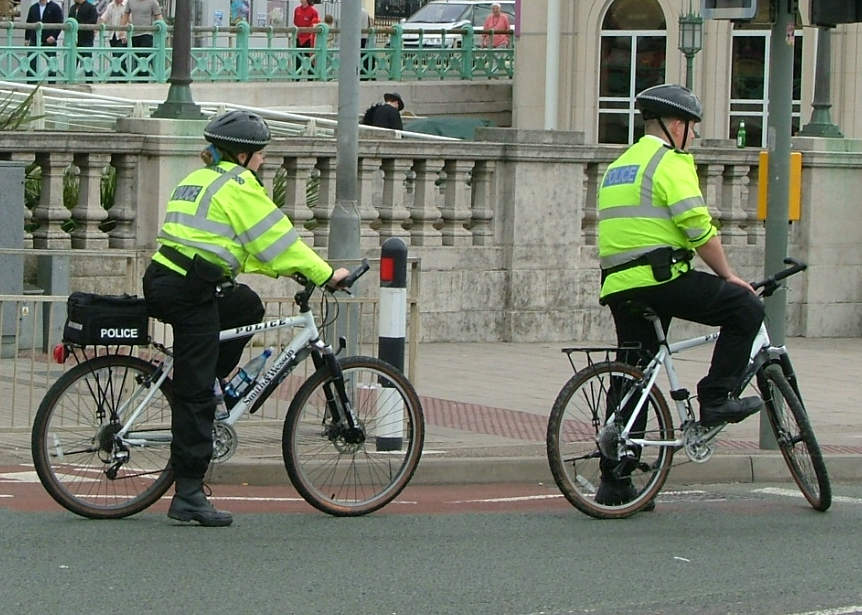
British police officers on custom Smith & Wesson bicycles

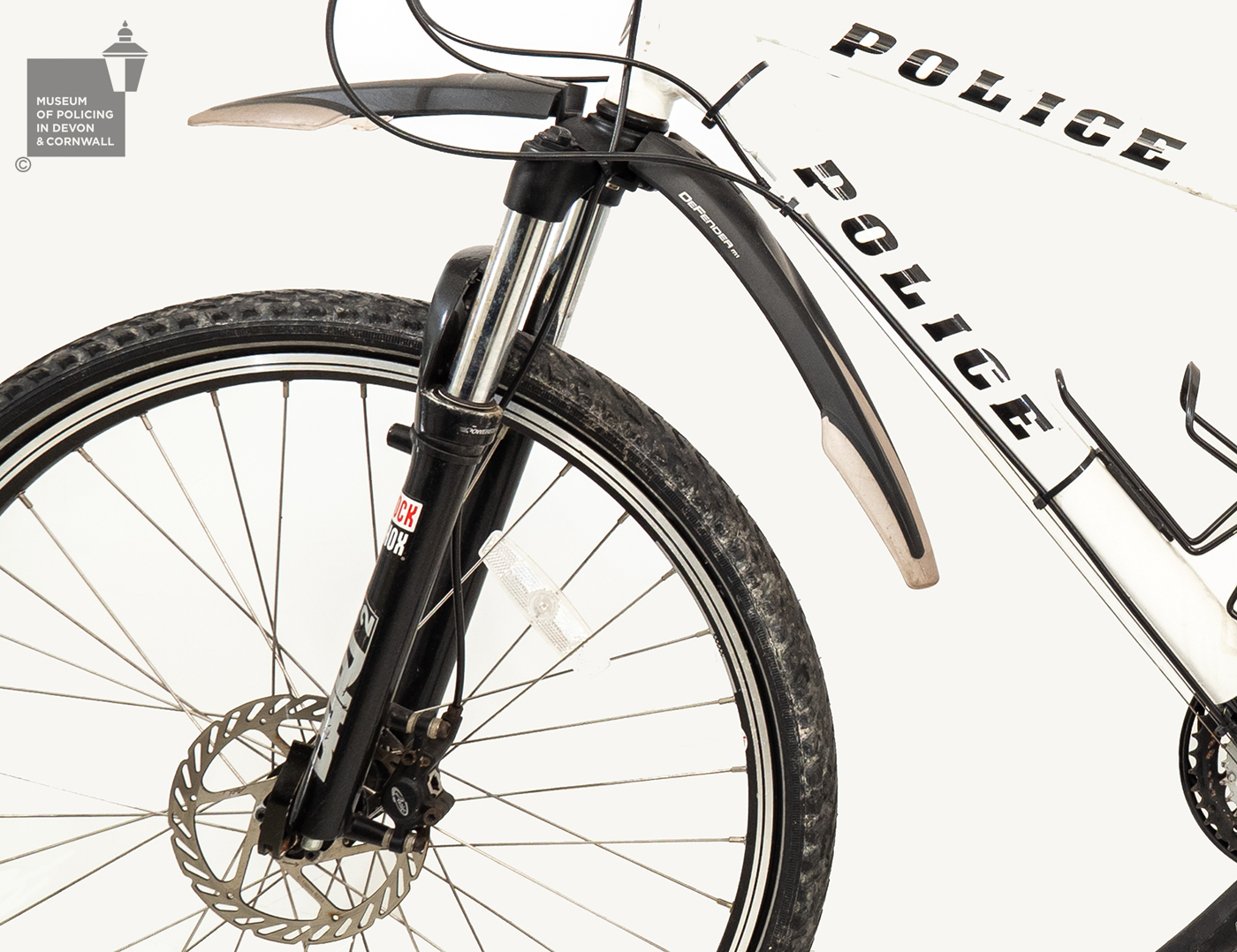
Smith & Wesson ‘Patrol’ custom bicycle made in Iowa, USA

The bicycles are custom designed for law enforcement use. Many manufacturers of bicycles offer police models, including Haro, Volcanic, Trek, Cannondale, Fuji, Safariland-Kona, Force, and KHS. Other companies offer police, fire and EMS specific models. Many are equipped with a rear rack and bag to hold equipment.

Police bicycles' pedals are almost always flat pedals, sometimes outfitted with toe clips/straps, to allow for normal shoes to be worn (versus cycling-specific shoes that clip into "clipless" pedals), allowing officers to dismount their bicycles and operate on foot if necessary.

Police bicycles are often equipped with bicycle lighting, emergency vehicle lighting, panniers, and bottle holders, and typically have a livery (such as the agency's logo) to visibly differentiate them from civilian bicycles. In the United Kingdom, emergency service bicycles were allowed to mount blue flashing lights from 21 October 2005. A red light is often attached to the rear of the bike.

Tires are usually semi-slick designs with smooth centers for street riding and mild tread or knobs on the outer edges to provide some traction if the bikes are ridden off a paved surface.

The U.S. National Institute for Occupational Safety and Health (NIOSH) has investigated the potential health effects of prolonged bicycling in police bicycle patrol units, including the possibility that some bicycle saddles exert excessive pressure on the urogenital area of cyclists, restricting blood flow to the genitals. NIOSH recommends that riders use a no-nose bicycle seat for workplace bicycling. In contrast, cycling expert Grant Petersen asserts that most modern saddles are designed to avoid excessive pressure on the urogenital area and that noseless saddles result in diminished bicycle handling capabilities.

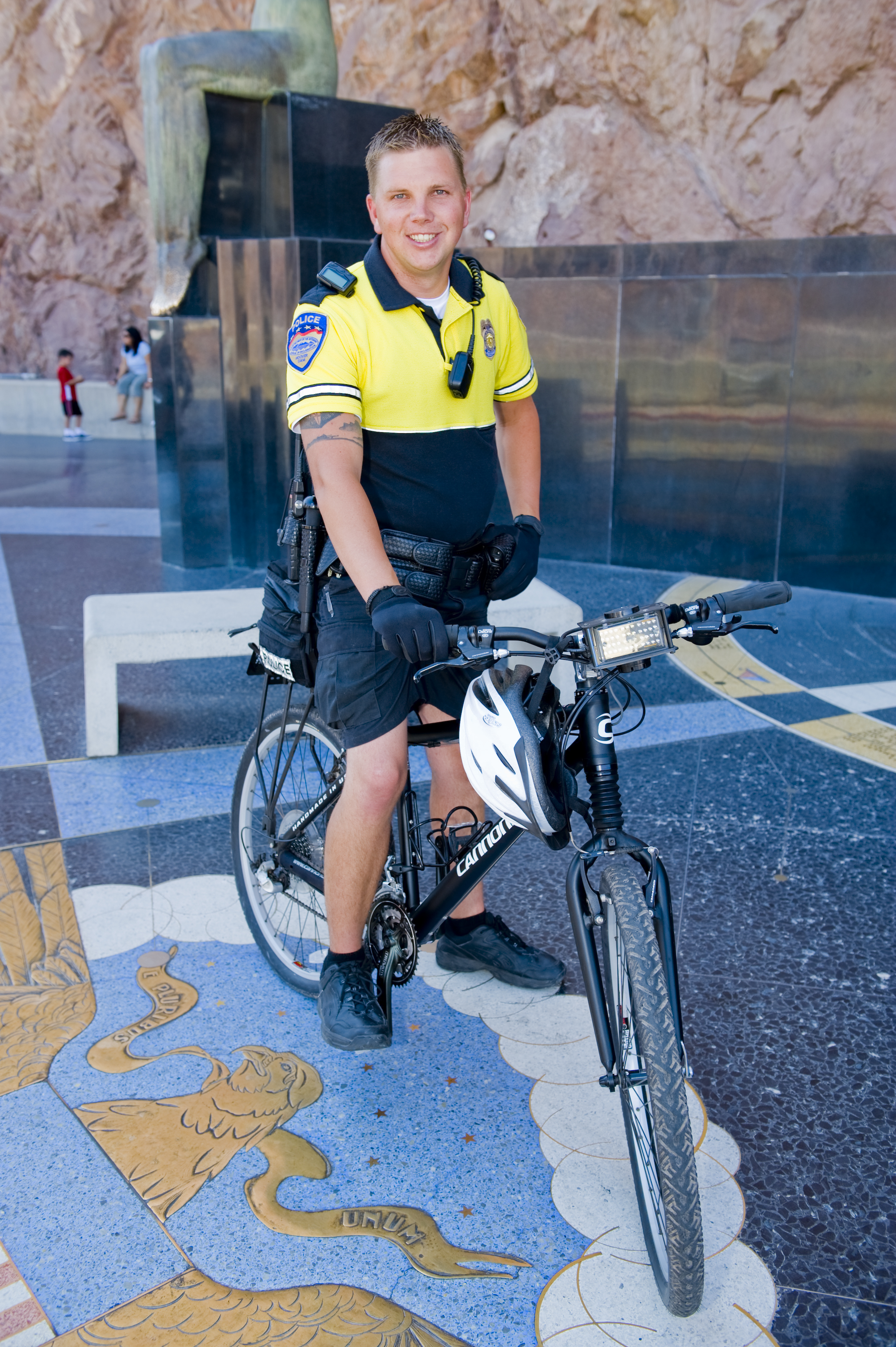
Hoover Dam Police officer on bike patrol

Cargo bike used in police service

Bicycle officers are typically trained at a police academy, though specialized training for bicycle officers has been provided by companies and professional organizations since roughly the early 1990s. Common training topics include nutrition, clothing and protective equipment, bike maintenance and repair, prevention of accidents and common injuries, slow speed balance and handling, technical maneuvers, night operations, bike and patrol equipment, firearms training, patrol tactics, and unit-level formations and crowd control techniques.

== Community policing ==
A 2008 study found that bicycle patrols provide greater public interaction than vehicle patrols. In the average hour, a patrol car would have 3.3 contacts with the public, while bicycle patrols had 7.3 contacts with the public. The average number of people in contact with the police per hour was 10.5 for motor patrols and 22.8 for bicycle patrols.

== See also ==
- Bicycle infantry
- Utility cycling
- Pacific Blue
- Outline of cycling
