= Sidi (company) =

Italian motorcycling and cycling clothing company

Sidi Sport S.r.l.
- Type: Private
- Industry: Motorsport clothing Cycling clothing
- Founded: 1960; 66 years ago, Maser
- Founder: Dino Signori
- Headquarters: Maser, Italy
- Area served: Worldwide
- Website: www.sidi.com

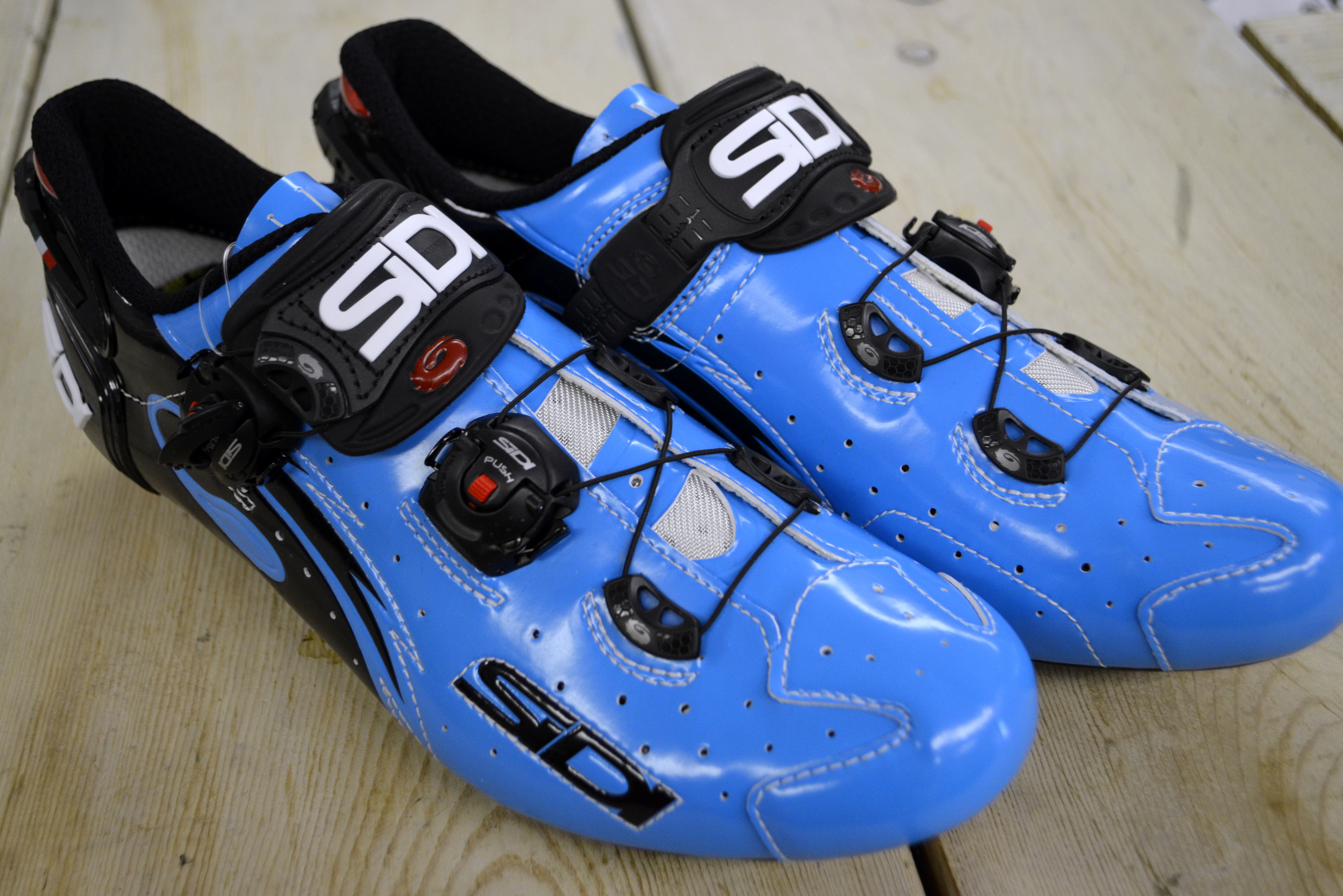
Sidi Carbon road shoes (Froome Edition)

SIDI (stylized as SiDI) is an Italian company founded in 1960 by its current president Dino Signori. The company takes its name from his initials. It specializes primarily in protective and technical footwear for diverse forms of cycling and motorcycling.

SIDI is one of the most well known brands of cycling shoes. Its non-MTB shoes have been used by many famous professional cyclists to win many important races, including world championships. Originally, shoes were made with leather uppers and leather soles. Sidi was one of the first, if not the first cycling shoe company to offer adjustable position cleats. Previous cleats needed to be mounted with tacks by a cobbler or the owner. The first Sidi shoe in 1973 was called the Sidi Titanium, and featured a large rectangular titanium plate that covered the area of the sole in contact with the pedal surface. Since the late 1970s, plastics and other man-made materials, including Lorica and carbon fibre have been used (in models such as Sidi Ergo 1 and Sidi Ergo 2).

Traditionally the shape of the shoes suited feet with a less broad toe area although there is now a "mega" size which is wider. SIDI also produces some other cycling clothing, such as socks.

SIDI sponsors many well known MotoGP riders such as Alex Barros, Anthony West, Chris Vermeulen, Colin Edwards, Loris Capirossi and Lukas Pesek.

In December 2022, it was announced SIDI had been acquired by the Milan-based investment holding company, Italmobiliare S.p.A.
