= Leg warmer =

Footless hosiery covering the lower legs

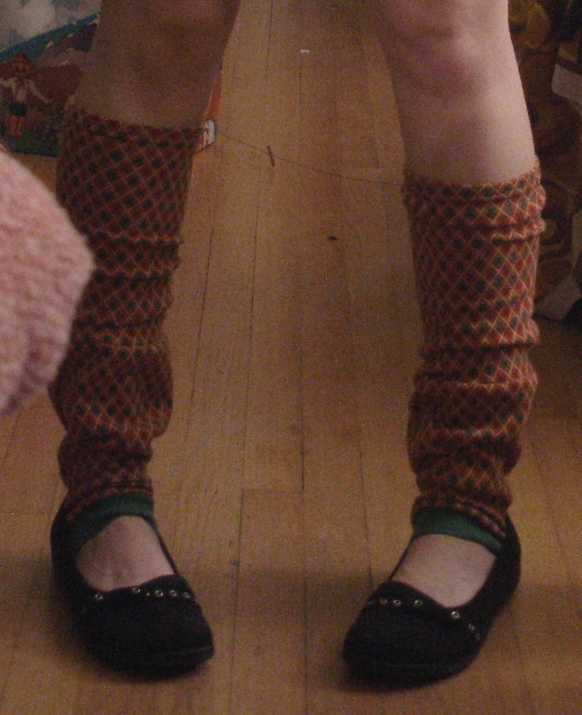
Leg warmers worn as fashion pieces

Leg warmers are coverings for the lower legs, similar to long socks but thicker and generally footless. Leg warmers are worn to keep the lower legs warm in colder weather. They can be tubular sleeves, long fabric wrappings, or simple pieces of fur or fabric tied around the calves. They are used in several outdoor activities and sports including cycling, soccer, hockey, hiking, ice skating, and dance.

They are used as dancewear by ballet and other classic dancers in order to keep the leg muscles warm and to prevent cramping or other muscle injuries. As of 2025, no scientific data has been yet collected to substantiate the claim that leg warmers prevent injury.

Traditionally knitted from pure sheep wool, modern variants are more typically made of cotton, synthetic fibers, or both. Some are made of other materials, such as chenille.

Leg warmers can vary in length, and in width, due to the material's stretchiness. They are commonly worn between the ankle to just below the knee, though many dancers prefer it to extend to cover the lower parts of the thigh. Some cover the entire foot—these "warmers" usually have a pad that grips the floor so the dancer does not slip. Some leg warmers are particularly short and made of thinner material; these are also known as ankle warmers.

Originally, legwarmers were worn by dancers to keep their muscles from cramping after stretching. In the early 1980s leg warmers became a fad after David Lee and Trisha Kate opened a dancewear shop in the East Village, New York. They mainly sold legwarmers. Wearing them was fashionable among teenage girls; later to be an adopted fashion by boys in the city of Berkeley in the San Francisco Bay Area. Their popularity was partly due to the influence of the films Fame, Xanadu and Flashdance and the concurrent aerobics craze. They were worn with leggings, jeans, and tights or as part of aerobic wear. They were internationally popular in the 1980s.

== See also ==
- Arm warmer
- Gaiters
- Leggings
- Loose socks
- Puttee
- Spats (footwear)
