= Arm warmer =

Clothing worn on the arms

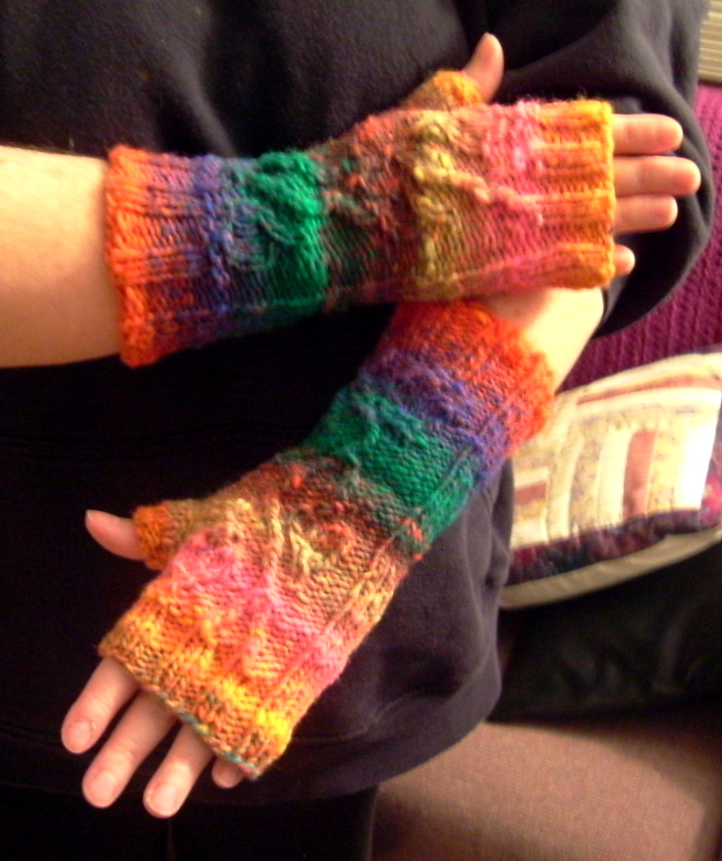

Arm warmers are knitted "sleeves" worn on the arms. Sometimes worn by dancers to warm up their bodies before class, they have also become a fashion item, popular in the fall.

Arm warmers can also describe any glove-like articles of clothing that lack finger coverings and/or were originally designed to keep wrists and lower arms warm. Today, many competition and sport bicyclists as well as distance runners/marathoners wear spandex-compression arm-warmers.

== History ==
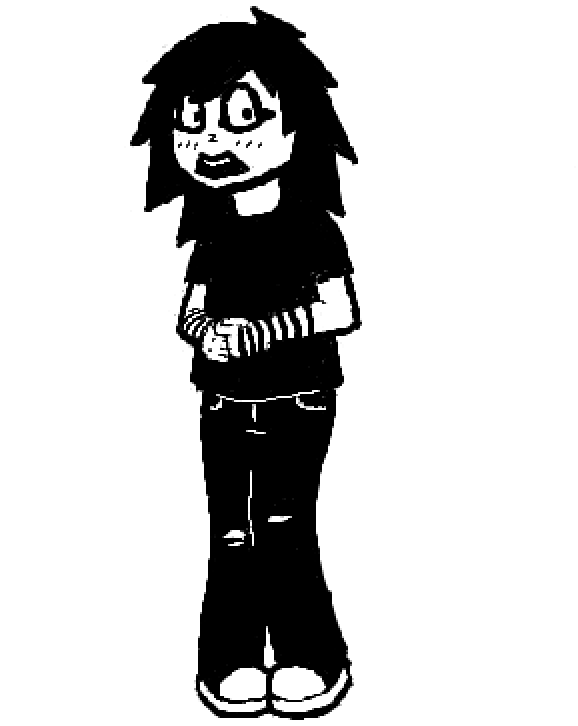
An illustration of a person wearing striped arm warmers

Various sub-cultures, such as the punk, emo, scene and goth subcultures, have also adopted arm warmers as a fashion statement.

== Sports ==
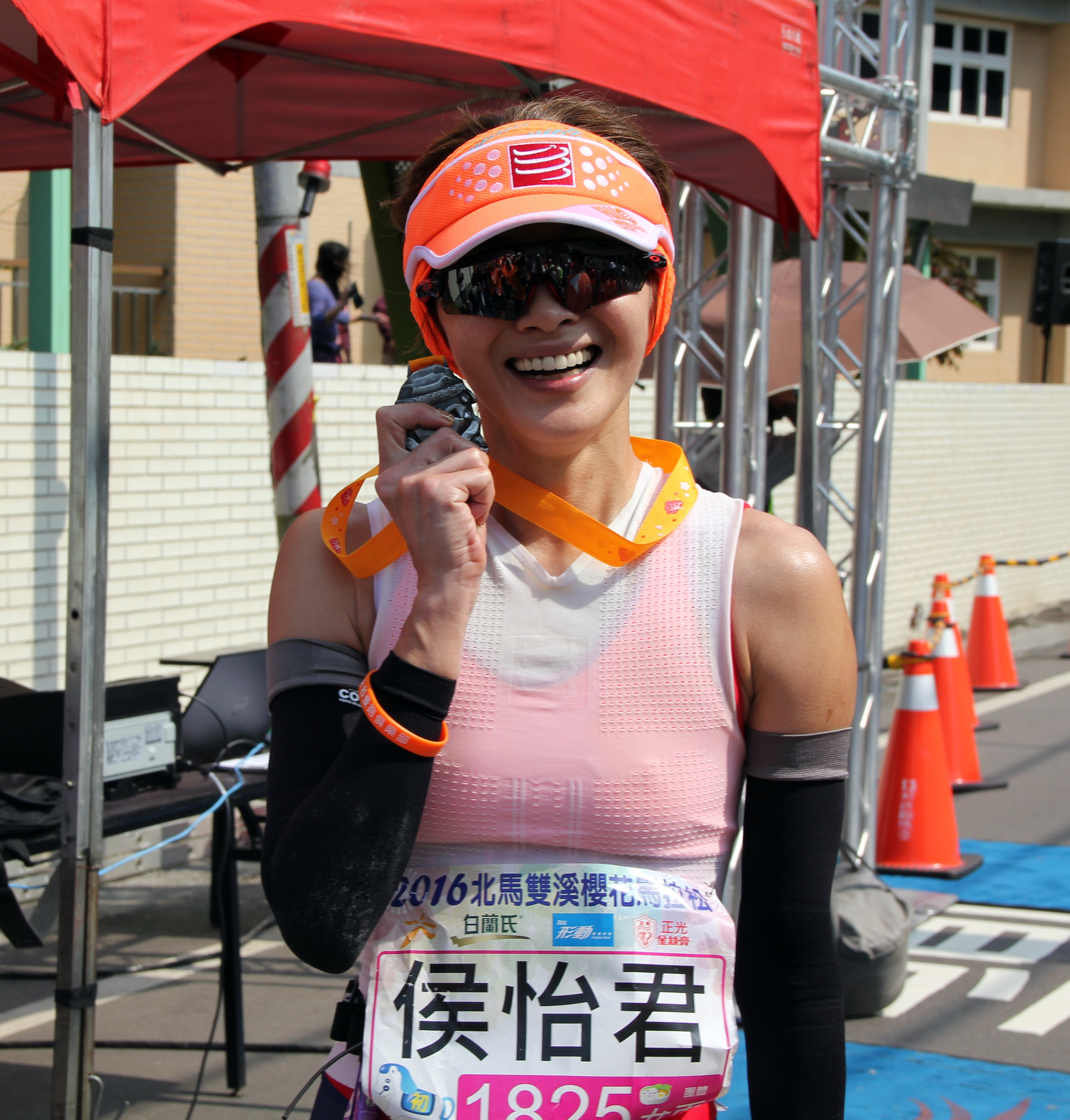
A marathon runner wearing running sleeves in Taipei, 2016

Sleeves made from Spandex or Lycra are used by long-distance runners and other endurance athletes. The compressive effect prevents swelling of the arm muscles and the build-up of lactic acid; they also provide insulation in cold weather and solar ultraviolet protection. During 2010 FIFA World Cup, arm warmers featuring the participating national teams became a phenomenon in the host country South Africa and abroad.

== See also ==
- Engageante
- Evening glove
- Gloves
- Leg warmer
