= Cycling shorts =

Shorts for bicycle riding

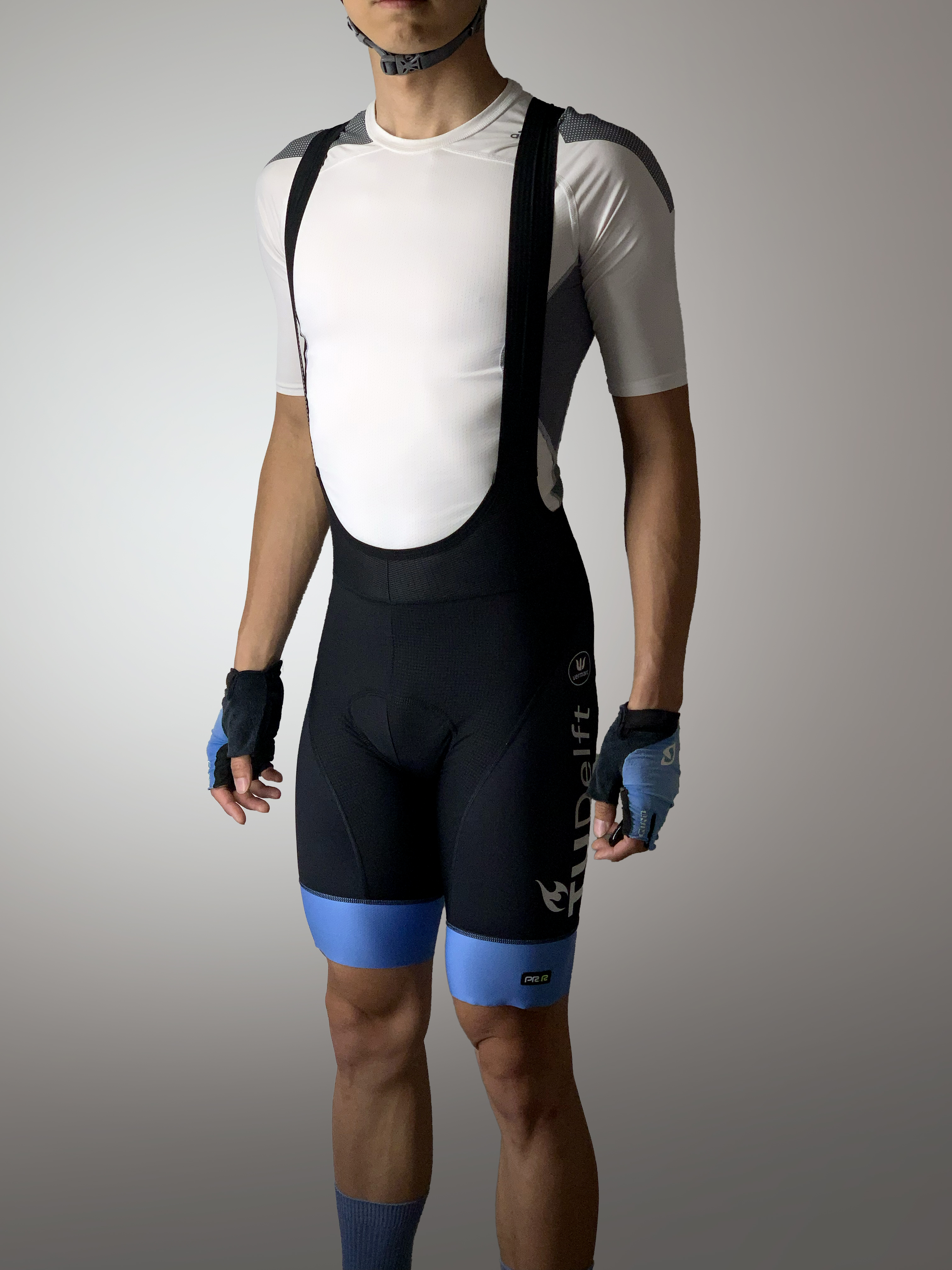
A male cyclist wearing a pair of bib shorts for road cycling. Normally a jersey would be worn on top.

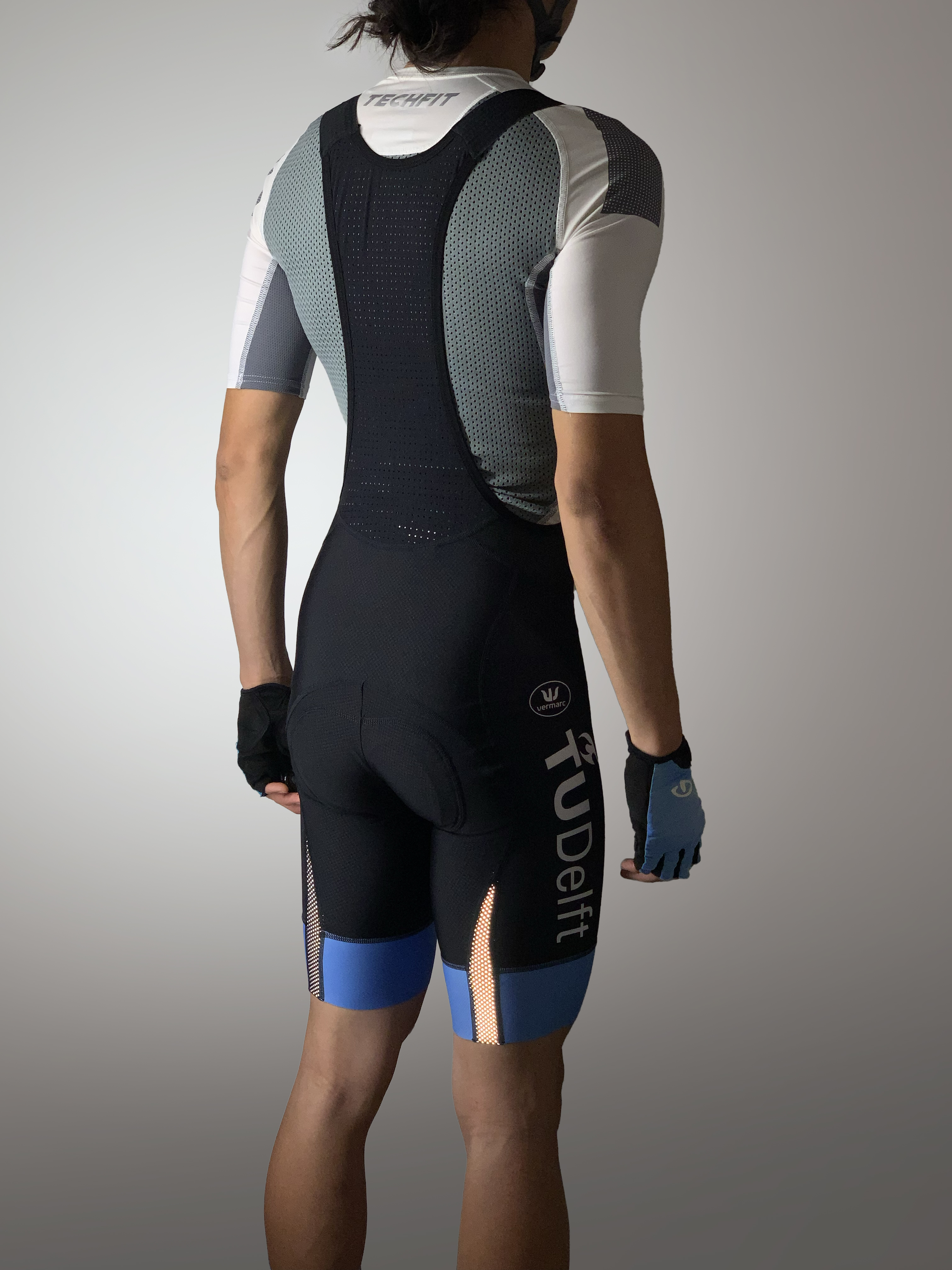
The rear side of the bib shorts showing the straps joining the shorts over the shoulders, padding on the bottom and reflective trims on the hem.

Cycling shorts (also known as bike shorts, bicycling shorts, chamois, knicks, or spats or thigh cling shorts) are short, skin-tight garments designed to improve comfort and efficiency while cycling.

Their useful properties are:

- reduce wind resistance, increasing aerodynamic efficiency;
- protect the skin against the repetitive friction of the legs against the bicycle seat or frame;
- provide support to the genitals, analogously to a jock strap;
- draw sweat away from the skin to prevent chafing and rashes, and to cool the rider down through the process of evaporation;
- compress the legs, which can help combat muscular fatigue;
- do not get caught up in the bike chain or other parts of the bike;
- reduce the weight of a rider's clothing (compared to wearing denim, gym shorts or baggy shorts); and
- improve comfort during long rides with extra padding in the seat area (called the cycling pad).

Historically, cycling shorts were made of knit black wool, which hides wear marks caused by sitting on an oiled leather saddle for extended periods of time, with a chamois leather padding inside the shorts in the crotch area, which reduces chafing from the bicycle saddle. Modern cycling shorts are often made of spandex (Lycra) with a synthetic chamois which acts as an elastic interface between the cyclist's body and the saddle, and are produced in a variety of shapes and styles to suit the needs of different riders. On some cycling shorts different materials are often placed on different parts of the shorts to take advantage of each material's benefit, providing a very efficient cycling short. For example, the patterns used for the chamois on women's cycling shorts tend to be quite different from those used for men's. The hem of each leg is usually lined with elastic and/or silicone that clings to the skin, keeping it in a fixed position. These shorts made from several panels (or cuts of fabric) fit better and are more beneficial, especially for racers, but cost more.

Short-legged elastic tights commonly worn as street wear, under girls' skirts and dresses, with longer oversized t-shirts, sweat shirts and sweaters, for gymnastics and ballet practice, or under athletic and running shorts, are sometimes also referred to as "bike shorts", but they are typically simpler and lighter garments than those worn by cyclists and generally lack the chamois or faux-chamois lining and may have plain or lace trimmed hems.

In 2021, the Norway women's national beach handball team was fined €1500 for being improperly dressed after the women wore bike shorts instead of bikini bottoms at a European championship match in Bulgaria. Critics derided the fine and the underlying rule. Although the Norwegian Handball Federation announced they would pay the fines, pop singer Pink offered to pay for them. Later, in November 2021, the International Handball Federation changed their dress rules to allow female players to wear some kinds of shorts, specifying "Female athletes must wear short tight pants with a close fit".

== Bib shorts ==
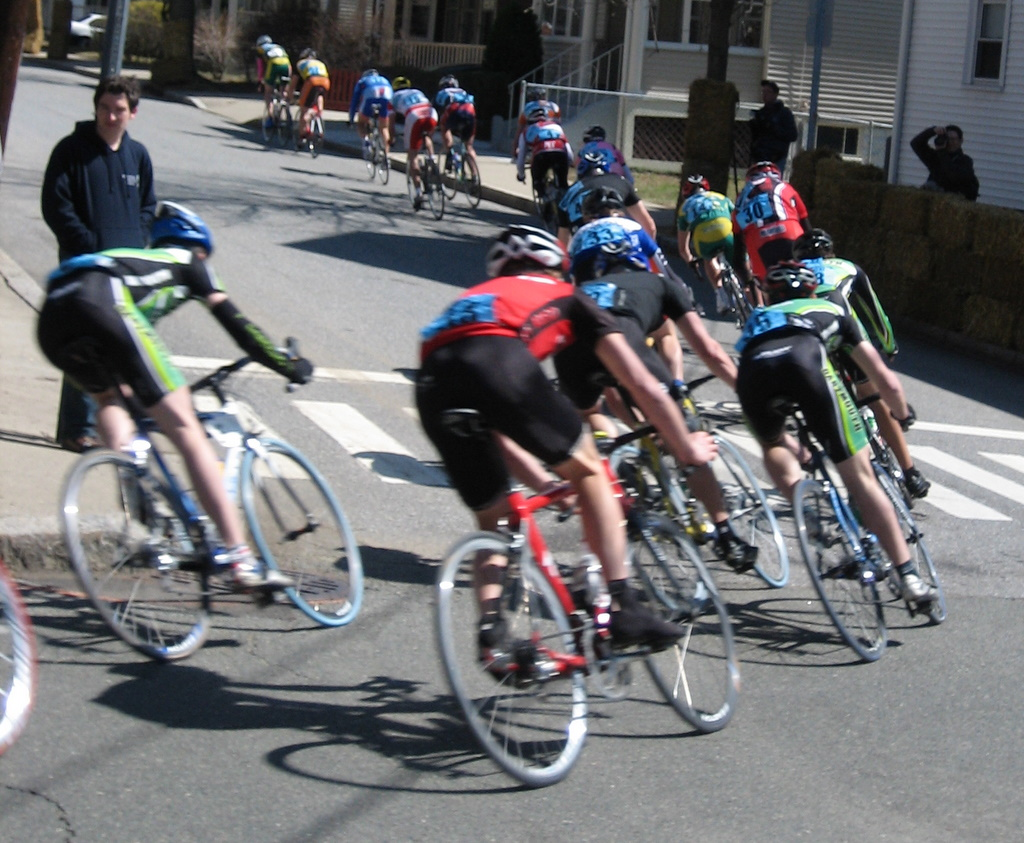
Racing cyclists wearing cycling shorts.

Bib shorts are cycling shorts that are held up by a bib (integral suspenders/braces) instead of an elastic waistband. Pro and serious riders tend to prefer bib shorts over non-bib shorts, due to the discomfort that often occurs with an elastic waistband, such as tightness (digging into skin) and chafing. The bib part of the short is often made of spandex and polyester with large sections of netting to help keep the rider cool.

The idea of modern bib shorts was a development from the braces (UK) or suspenders (US) that cyclists once used to hold up old-fashioned wool shorts, which had a tendency to become loose and heavy from riders' sweat (the use of braces/suspenders meant the shorts could be held up without an uncomfortably tight waistband). Bib shorts are well-suited to tall riders and riders with protruding stomachs because regular shorts can tend to fall down in the back while riding.

== Mountain bike shorts ==
These shorts typically are looser than bib shorts but still not baggy. This is because they are focused more on protecting the rider during falls and are not as focused on aerodynamic efficiency. The position of the padding is a little different because mountain bikers have a more upright body position when riding. These shorts are different from baggy shorts as they are used by hardcore cyclists who still need the protection with a good padding, which the baggy shorts do not have.

== Baggy shorts ==
Baggy shorts (or shy shorts) are cycling shorts that look like regular shorts on the outside, but that are designed for cycling. Some have a thin chamois lining on the inside. This lining ranges from polyester fabric to full eight-panel, form-fitting cycling shorts beneath the baggier outside shorts. Others are designed to be worn with a separate liner short underneath. These shorts provide a more casual look when riding around town and off dedicated bike paths. These shorts are basically dual purpose in that the wearer need not to change from tight singular purpose cycling shorts into casual clothes when going out yet have some of the benefits of wearing cycling shorts.

== See also ==
- Bloomers
- Compression garment
- Cycling kit
- Knickerbockers
- Swim jammer
- Trouser clips
