= Cycling pad =

Type of cycling legwear

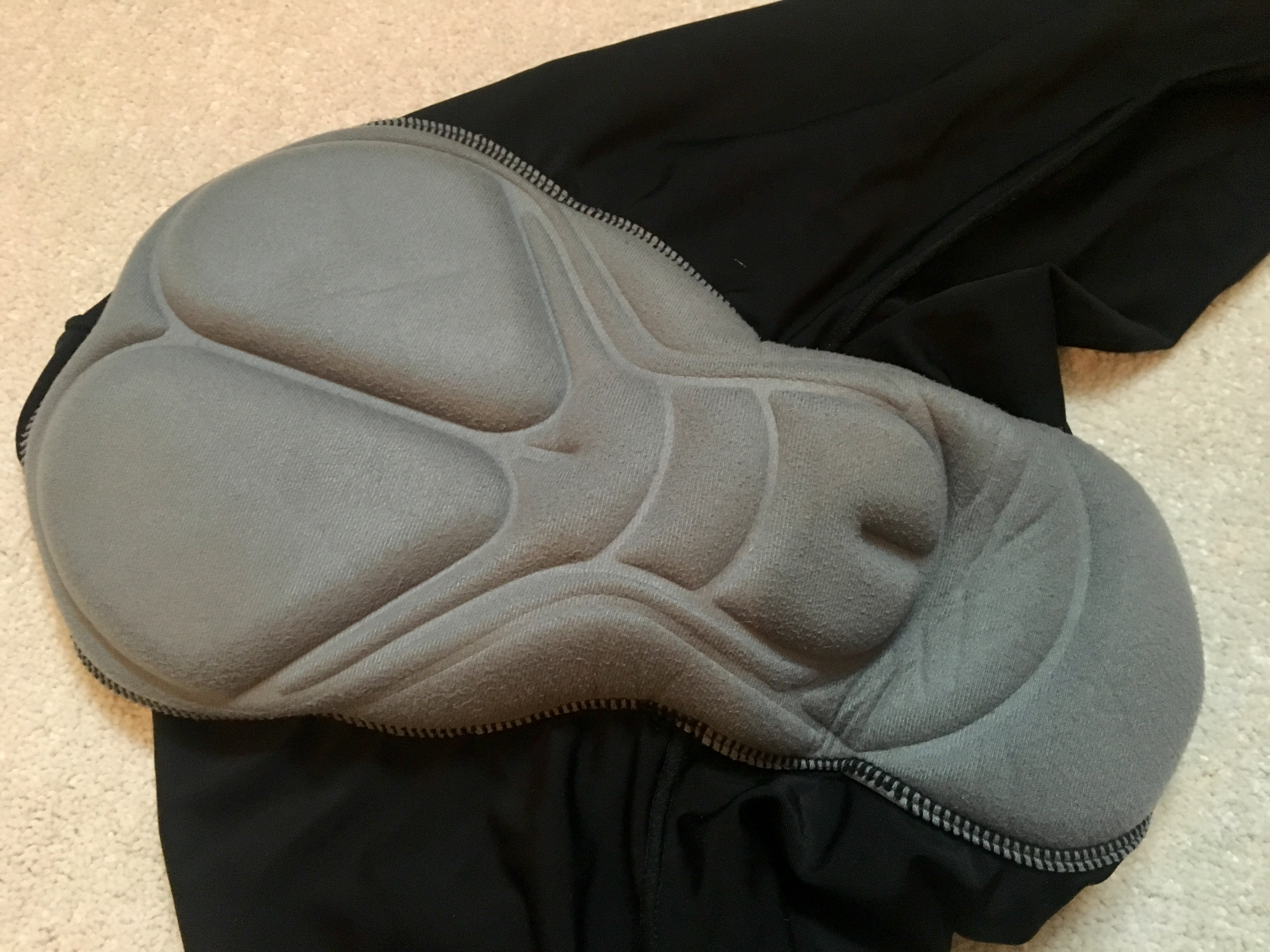
Cycling Pad

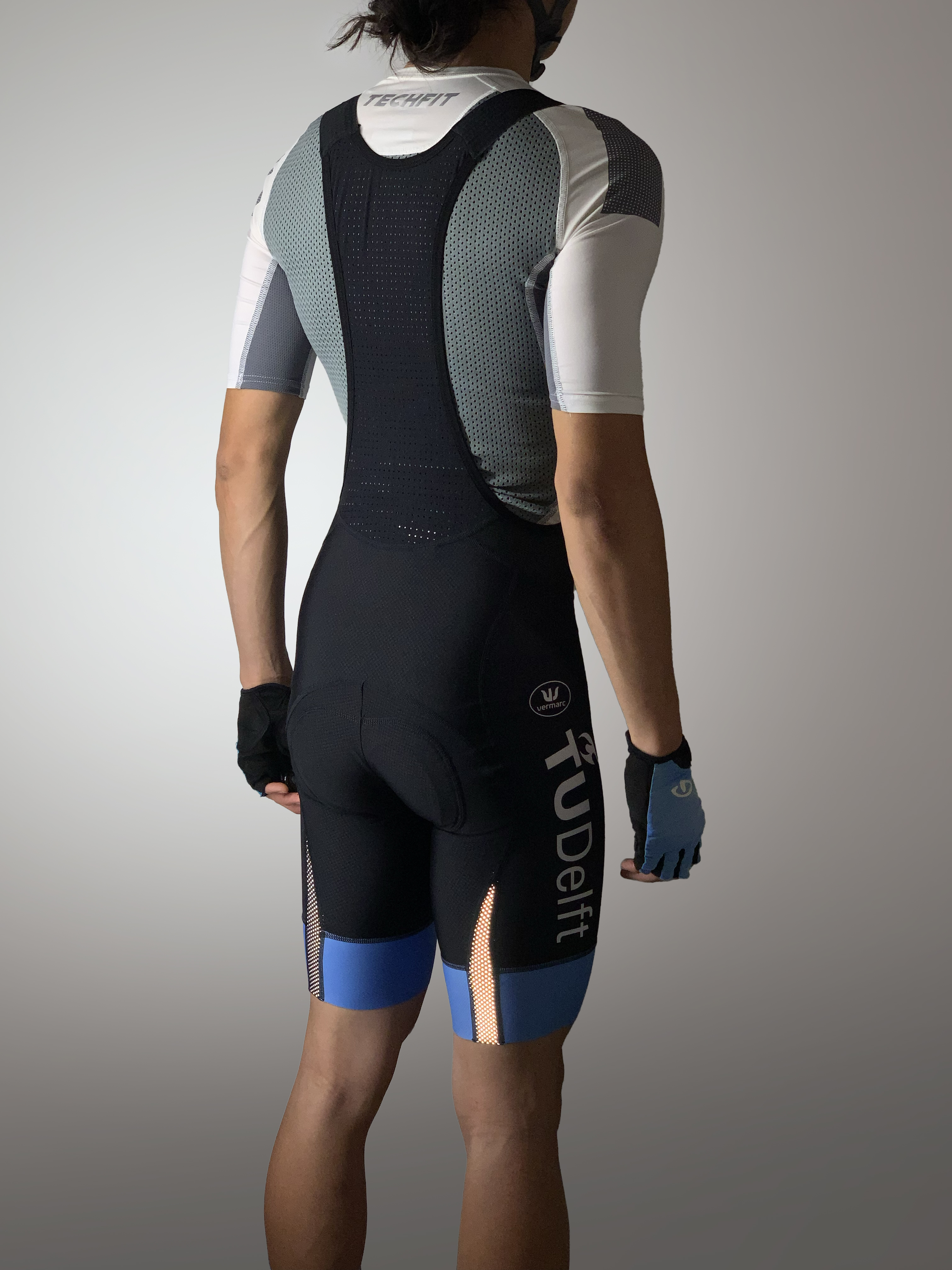
Cycling pads on the bottom of a pair of bib shorts worn by a male road cyclist (a cycling jersey is normally worn on top).

A cycling pad, also known as "chamois" or "bikepad" or "Fondello" (Italian), Peau (French) is a protective insert that is applied in cycling shorts with the main purpose of protecting the groin from the friction of constant and prolonged saddle contact. Cycling pads were developed at the beginning of the 1900s and were exclusively made of deer leather up until the 1980s, when technical fabrics were introduced, and allowed for enhanced performance.

The first high-tech thermo molded cycling pads date back to the early 1990s; gel inserts also make their first appearance and are used in addition to polyurethane foams.

It is only in the year 2000 that the chamois is produced with an elastic technology, which allows the pad to move with the cyclist's body. This technology acts as an elastic interface between the cyclist's body and the saddle. These few square inches are subject to the pressure of most of the body's weight. For this reason, it is essential for a cycling pad to be capable of protecting the body from the compression the body exerts in contact with the saddle and from chafing in the inner leg area.

In the 2000s chamois designers began to design female and male specific cycling pads. The male-specific cycling pads feature deeper channels, while the women specific cycling pads feature wider areas, taking into account the relative anatomical differences.

The cycling pad is the functional component of the entire cycling short. Its functions are:

- To protect the cyclist's body whose weight exerts vertical pressure on the saddle, supplying maximum protection particularly at a perineal and ischiatic level, also helping to protect from urogenital disorders, beyond delivering the highest level of comfort possible through its elasticity, which allows the pad to move with the body. The athlete can focus and concentrate on their pedal stroke instead of coping with discomfort and annoying pains that can arise due to continuous compression on a limited surface such as a bicycle saddle.
- To supply protection to avoid chafing due to pedal strokes. An athlete can easily count an average of 100 pedal strokes per minute, totaling 18,000 revolutions in three hours. Without an adequate cycling pad, continuous chafing can lead to rashes and perhaps even cause the skin to tear.
- To offer a skin compatible, hygienic solution (since some cyclists do not wear undergarments under their cycling pad) by absorbing sweat and leaving the skin in the intimate parts as dry as possible, preventing skin irritation. Some cycling pads on the market have bacteriostatic properties (e.g. based on fabrics that are developed with carbon thread or fabric with antibacterial treatment).
- To potentially reduce unnecessary movements and saving energy and oxygen.

There are different types of chamois that are intended for different purposes:

- Long distance rides call for a cycling pad with high density foams. Some pads available on the market have up to four different foam densities that come in contact with different areas of the body, some other pads avoid inserts by shaping the foams in different thicknesses. There are also extreme categories like Ultracycling, for those who race up to 24 hours consecutively.
- A cycling pad for short to medium distance rides will be made with less protection and the pads will be made with lower density foams, that allow for greater freedom of movement on and off the saddle.

Furthermore, there are specific pads designed for special cycling disciplines such as triathlon, mountain bike, cyclocross, crono time trial, and indoor cycling.
