= Erotic spanking =

Act of spanking another person for sexual arousal or gratification

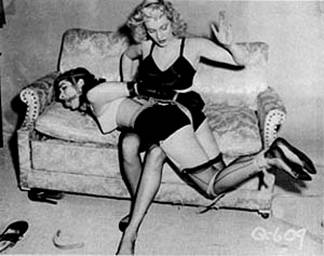
Bettie Page is tied and spanked in an image from the magazine Bizarre (1940s–1950s)

Erotic spanking is the act of spanking another person for the sexual arousal or gratification of either or both parties. The intensity of the act can vary in both its duration and severity, and may include the use of one or more spanking implements (such as the wooden spoon or cane). Activities range from a spontaneous smack on bare buttocks during sexual activity to sexual roleplaying, such as ageplay or domestic discipline. Erotic spanking is often found within and associated with BDSM, but the activity is not exclusive to it. The term spankee is commonly used within erotic spanking to refer to the individual receiving a spanking.

== History ==
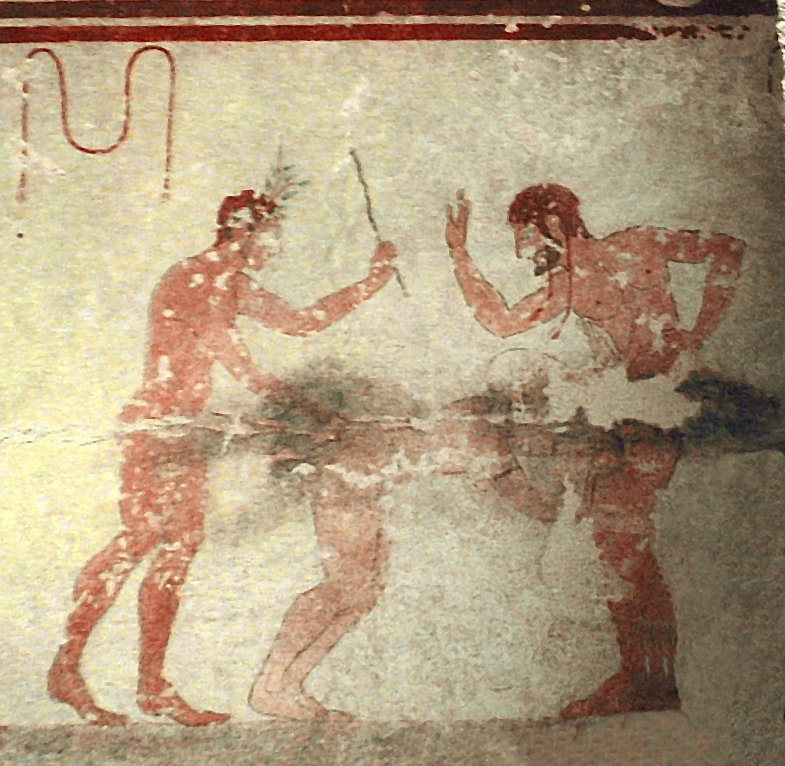
Fresco inside the Etruscan Tomb of the Whipping, where two men are portrayed spanking a woman in an erotic situation

=== Pre 19th century ===
One of the earliest depictions of erotic spanking is found in the Etruscan Tomb of the Whipping from the fifth century BC.

Early sex manuals such as the Indian Kama Sutra (circa 400 BC), Indian Koka Shastra (ca. 1150 AD) and Arabic The Perfumed Garden (ca. 1400 AD) have among their recommendations the use of spanking to enhance sexual arousal.

=== 19th century, western world ===
An increase in interest in erotic spanking can be observed during the 19th century in the form of spanking literature and spanking photography, particularly in France, the Netherlands and the United Kingdom. Numerous limited edition spanking novels were published, many of which are now classified as novellas.

=== Early 20th century, western world ===
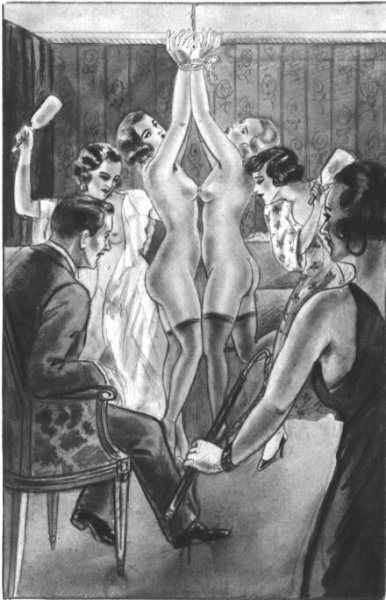
Spanking illustration by J. X. Dumoulin for the spanking-centred novel Humiliations chéries (1936)

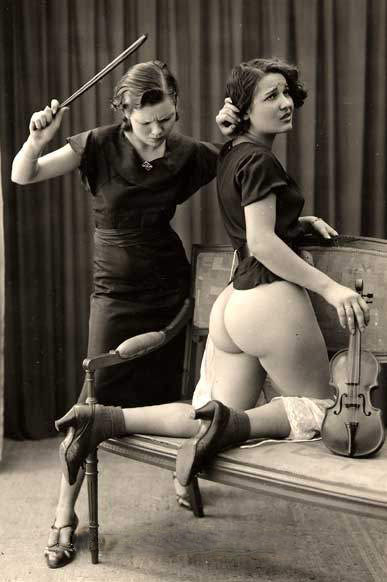
Erotic spanking photograph (circa 1930s) from the Ostra Studio, notably featuring a violin bow being used as an unconventional and 'improvised' spanking implement

This interest for spanking (both in regards to literature and photography) followed into the next century, with the early 20th century being considered the "Golden Age" of spanking literature. This period of spanking literature is marked by three notable characteristics. First, greater audiences were reached with the availability of less expensive editions and greater print runs. Second, many of the spanking novels contained numerous illustrations (many of which have fallen under public domain and are easily available online). Third, this period saw a gradual increase in the output and publication of spanking literature, growing particularly within the 1920s and peaking within the 1930s. Much of the output of spanking literature during this period was by French publishers, writers and illustrators. For example, Jules Malteste, known as Louis Malteste (1862–1928) was a French writer, painter, engraver, lithographer, draughtsman, and illustrator, commonly known for his depictions of spanking. Similarly, within the context of spanking photography, France was also the home to the creation of much content, with the most notable studios being the Biederer Studio and the related Ostra Studio. This "Golden Age" of spanking literature (and French spanking photography) came to an end as a result of the Second World War, more specifically due to the German occupation of France between 1940 and 1944 and later the enforcement of censorship laws. A somewhat notable exception to the decline of spanking literature during this period was John Willie's bondage Bizarre magazine (published between 1946 and 1959).

Of the many French works from the "Golden Age" few at the time were translated into other languages within which spanking literature was popular, namely English and German, but beginning during the mid-1960s a number of these French works were translated into English and published, along with these works being republished in French and older British works also being republished. The occurrence of this was facilitated by the availability of mass-produced paperbacks and changes in censorship laws.

=== Late 20th century ===
During the latter half of the 20th century changes in both censorship laws and improvements within technology enabled greater accessibility for those interested in obtaining content related to erotic spanking.

As an extension of the earlier developments within spanking literature and photography, during this period various fetish magazines devoted to stories and imagery of erotic spanking became legally available.

This period also saw an important development in both the production and consumer accessibility of erotic spanking films. Whilst recordings of erotic spanking had been produced as early as the 1920s, until the 1980s technology limited the quality of their recording and the ability for consumers to easily watch them. In addition to changes in censorship laws, the introduction of the videocassette recorder enabled creators to produce and distribute erotic spanking films that were far easier for consumers to both obtain and watch.

== Practice ==
=== Implements ===
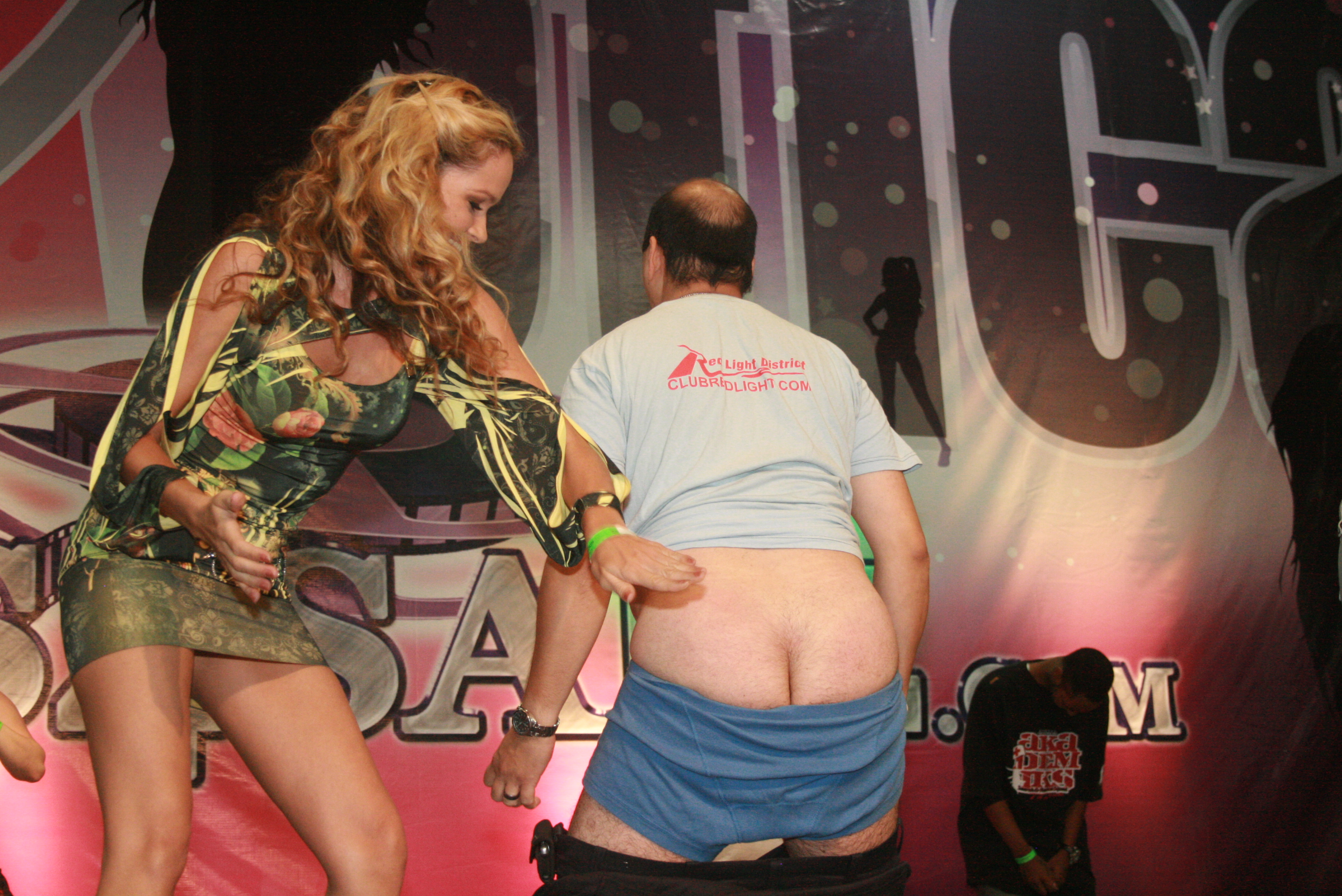
A woman spanking a man at Exxxotica Expo, 2009

Whilst a spanking may be simply given with the palm of the hand, the use of spanking implements is common within erotic spanking. Spanking implements which are commonly used within erotic spanking are a reflection of the traditional spanking implements that were/are used in corporal punishment more broadly. Common and traditional spanking implements include those which have been specifically manufactured for such purpose (e.g., the cane, spanking paddle, strap/tawse, and martinet) and those which have been adapted/improvised from available items (e.g., the plimsoll, carpet slipper, wooden spoon, hairbrush, bath brush, carpet beater, leather belt, riding crop, switch, and birch). Other less common and atypical spanking implements include the (handle of a) feather duster (common, however, in China), fly swatter, flip-flop, wooden ruler, wooden yardstick, ping-pong paddle, hardcover book, and stinging nettles.

Some spanking implements can be characterised as being either 'stingy' or 'thuddy'. Stingy implements (such as a rattan cane) produce a sharp and quick burning sensation which is mostly felt on the skin. Thuddy implements (such as a wooden paddle), in contrast, whilst not producing a stinging sensation penetrate deeper into tissue of the buttocks. As a general rule, the heavier a spanking implement is the greater thud it will produce. A person receiving an erotic spanking may have a preference for either a stingy or thuddy sensation.

=== Safety ===
Due to obvious risks involved, experts have recommended that, during a spanking, particularly with spanking implements, great care be taken to avoid striking the tailbone and hipbones.

=== Apparatuses ===
Erotic spanking can include the use of apparatuses, both those which are adapted/improvised and those which are specifically created for such use.

The use of adapted/improvised apparatuses within erotic spanking derives from how such apparatuses were used in non-erotic spanking. The gymnastic vaulting buck (which sees the receiver of the spanking bent-over it) was often employed during non-erotic school slipperings and canings; consequently erotic spanking, particularly that which involves school roleplay, may incorporate use of a vaulting buck.

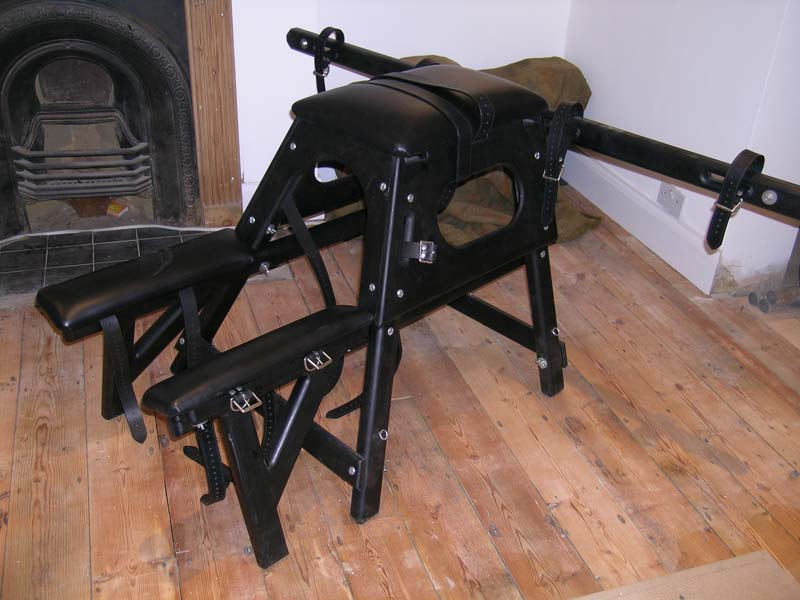
A spanking bench

A spanking bench or spanking horse is a piece of erotic furniture explicitly created for erotic spanking. It is used to position a spankee on, with or without restraints. They come in many sizes and styles, the most popular design of which is similar to a sawhorse (used in woodworking) with a padded top and rings for restraints. The 19th-century British dominatrix Mrs. Theresa Berkley became famous for her invention of the Berkley Horse, a similar form of BDSM apparatus.

=== Fetish wear ===
Often erotic spanking will be combined with sexual roleplay which may see one or more parties dress up in certain clothing, for example a female spankee wearing a schoolgirl uniform in a Teacher–Student scenario.

A spank skirt or spanking skirt is a skirt that has an additional opening in back designed to expose the buttocks. While the name spank skirt suggests the intention that the wearer be spanked without removing or repositioning the skirt, this item may be worn for reasons other than spanking (for instance, exhibitionism). Considered fetish wear, these kinds of skirts are typically tight-fitting and made of fetishistic materials (such as leather, PVC or latex). Regardless of the gender of the wearer, spank skirts are usually considered female attire.

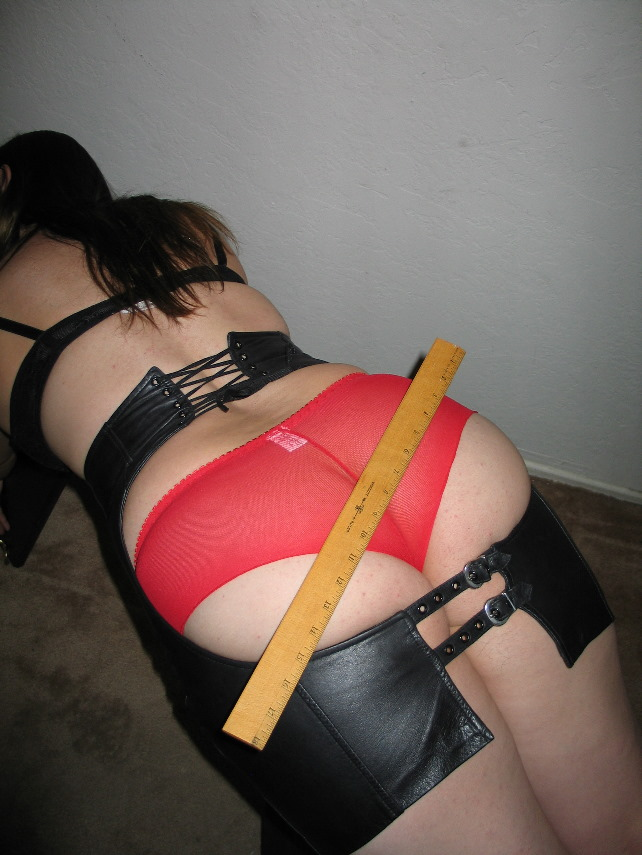
A person wearing a spanking skirt, with a ruler for spanking laid across their buttocks.

=== Self-spanking ===
Self-spanking is the practice in which the individual spanks themselves, thus making the spankee and the spanker one and the same. This can occur for a number of reasons: the individual is experimenting with spanking; the individual may lack someone (who is willing and the spankee is comfortable with doing so) to give them a spanking; the individual spanks themselves during masturbation; the individual is a submissive in a BDSM relationship and is self-spanking on orders of the dominant partner.

== Psychology and prevalence ==
A number of explanations have been put forward to account why an individual may enjoy erotic spanking, although there is almost certainly no universal explanation. Interest and gratification in spanking varies per the individual: an individual may gain gratification in spanking another and gain no gratification in being spanked themself; an individual may gain gratification in being spanked and gain no gratification in spanking another; an individual may gain gratification in both spanking another and being spanked themself.

A scientific survey of 152 people who claimed to practice sadomasochism — of which spanking is a subset — categorised the origin of such interest to be either extrinsic (i.e. the interest originating from a source external to the person) or intrinsic (i.e. emerged naturally). 22% of those surveyed reported origins that were categorised by researchers as extrinsic, such as parental discipline or being introduced to sadomasochism in adulthood by another. In contrast, 78% reported intrinsically having such an interest. Most commonly an intrinsic interest was reported to have emerged in either childhood or adolescence (though at such age the interest was not necessarily sexualised); a small sub-group reported that only in adulthood did they accept or acknowledge what they now recognise to be an intrinsic interest. The majority of those that reported an intrinsic interest were unable to explain the origin of such interest.

From the same scientific survey as above, a third of testimonies reported enjoying receiving pain as to why they practiced sadomasochism; researchers noted that practitioners commonly stressed the difference between "bad" and "good" pain. Interpersonal power (either through giving or exchanging power) was also a commonly reported reason as to why people practice sadomasochism, and researchers noted that this taking place with a trusted partner was a recurring specified need.

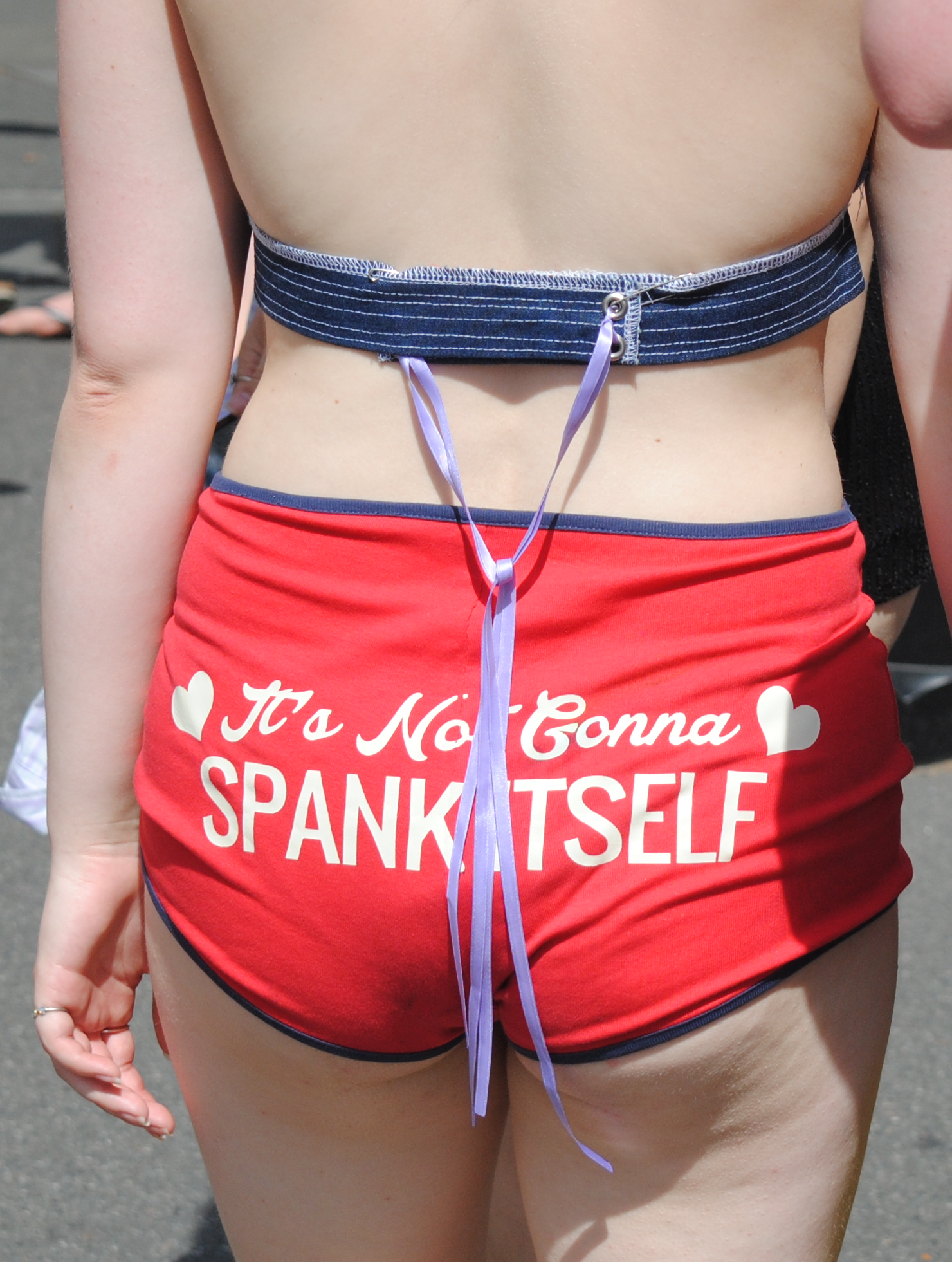
Rear view of a young woman wearing red hotpants, with the words "It's not gonna spank itself" on the seat, at Pride in London 2026

Journalist Jillian Keenan has argued that spanking fetishism is a form of sexual orientation, which should not be considered a mental illness. Whilst there has been an increasing ability to talk openly about erotic spanking within mainstream society, individuals may still find it difficult to express that they have an interest in erotic spanking.

== See also ==
- Algolagnia – Core tendency of sadomasochism
- BDSM – Erotic practices involving domination and sadomasochism
- Christian domestic discipline
- Dominatrix – Woman who takes the dominant role in BDSM activities
- Impact play – Human sexual practice
- Male dominance (BDSM) – Erotic practice
- Sadism and masochism in fiction
- Sadomasochism – Sexual practice
