= Latex clothing =

Clothing made of latex rubber

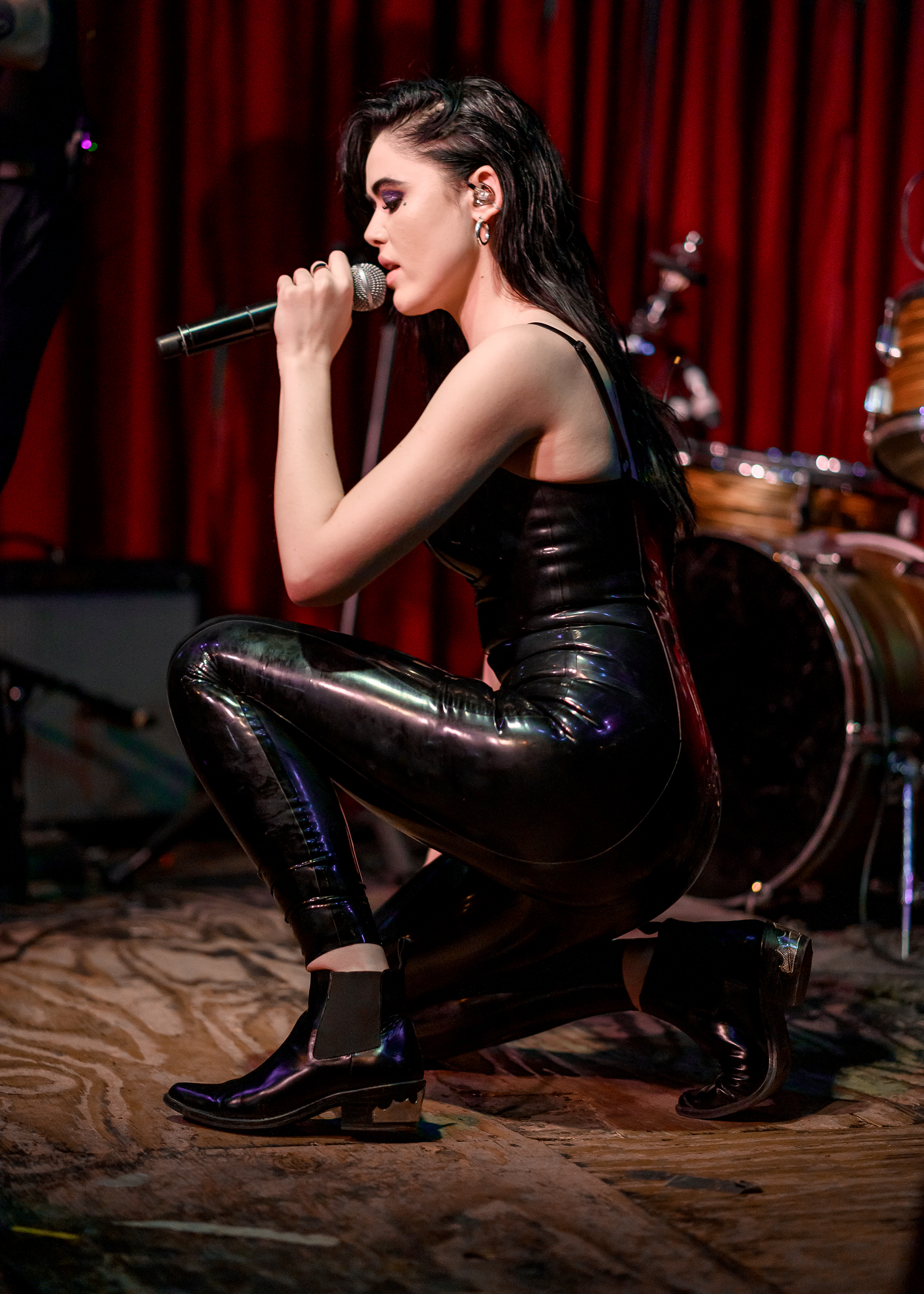
A musician performing in a latex outfit in 2018

Latex rubber is used in the manufacture of many types of clothing. It has traditionally been used to make protective clothing, including gas masks and Wellington boots. Mackintoshes have traditionally been made from rubberized cloth. However, rubber has now generally been replaced in these applications by synthetic polymers.

Latex rubber as a clothing material is common in fetish fashion and among BDSM practitioners, and is often worn at fetish clubs. It is sometimes also used by couturiers for its unusual appearance. Several magazines are dedicated to its use. Latex clothing tends to be skin-tight, but can also be loose-fitting.

== Design and manufacture ==
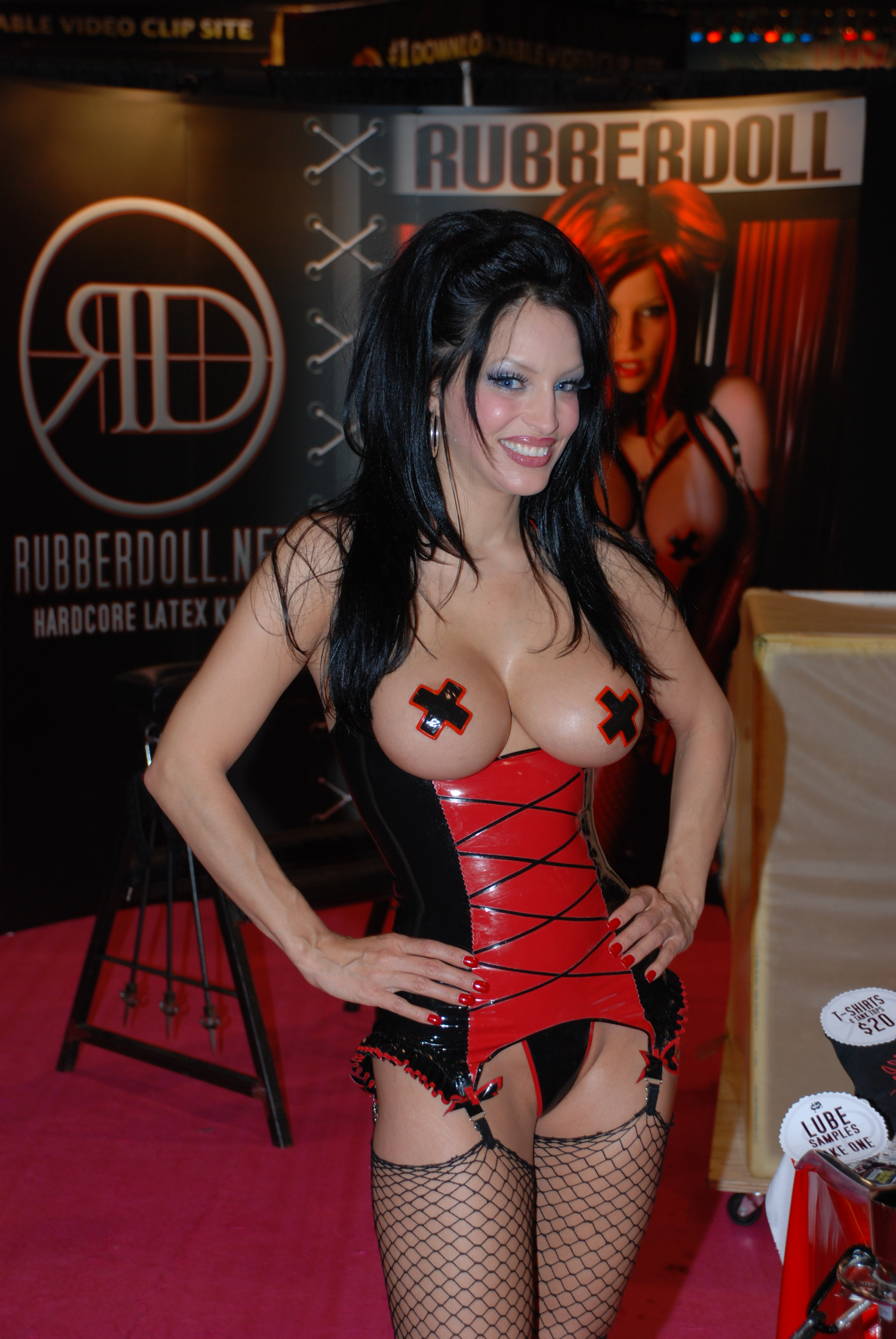
A fetish model and dominatrix wearing pasties and fetish fashion themed latex dress at Exxxotica, US. The poster beside her reads "hardcore latex".

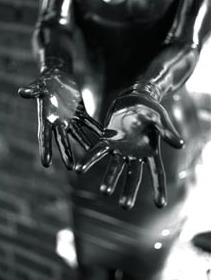
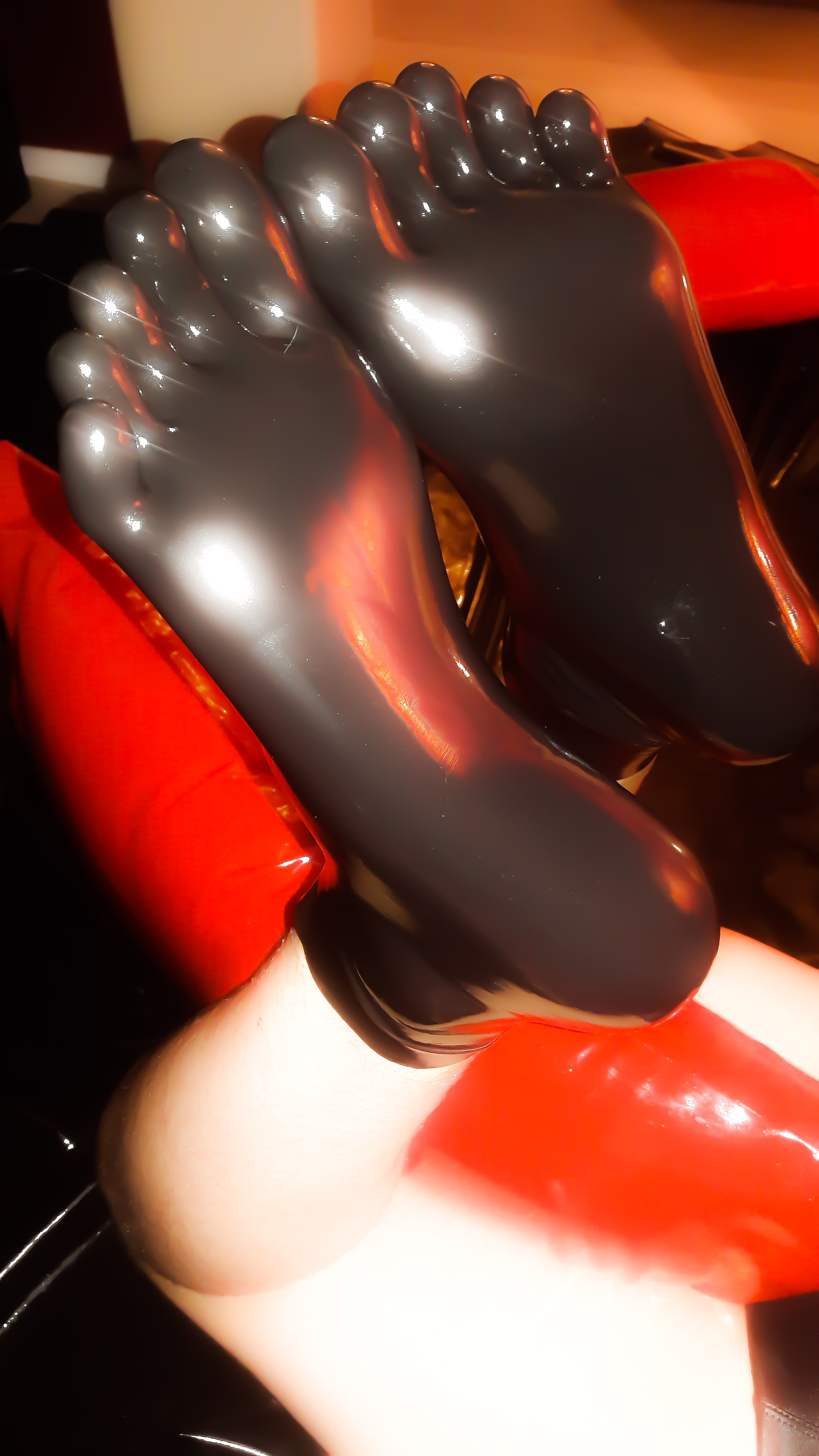
Left: latex gloves. Right: latex socks.

A small number of companies around the world manufacture latex suitable for contact with human skin, and supply it to a larger number of smaller fashion clothing companies. In the past, some markets suffered from de facto monopoly supply conditions, where a sheet supplier could impose restrictive ordering requirements. Being able to order only half-kilometre long batches of sheet in the colours and thicknesses they wanted meant that designers and clothing producers often had to co-operate, or face long delays in supplying their customers.

Since 2000, the sheet market has been exposed to competition via the Internet, resulting in a large number of cottage industry latex fetish clothing makers.

Sheet-based latex clothing is made in a three-stage process:

1. A pattern for a specific garment is selected and adjusted carefully to the measurements supplied by the customer.
2. Sheet latex is cut out by hand on a flat board.
3. Glue (generally rubber cement or a similar solvent-based adhesive) is applied to join the seams.

Skilled latex makers can build a stocking, shaped to match the contours of a specific person's leg, from latex only 0.2 millimetres (1/100 inch) thick, in under an hour. It is possible to use water-based glues such as Copydex; however, the items' durability is usually affected.

Latex molded clothing is produced by dipping a mold into a vat of liquid latex. It is difficult to keep the thickness of the resultant layer of latex consistent, which can cause the latex to fail at its weak points. Molded latex is the preferred method for the crafting of items with complex contours such as hoods and gloves, for which the shaping of solid latex sheets is impossible. Sheet latex is the preferred method for items such as catsuits that do not need perfect form fitting.

While there is typically no significant difference between latex clothing made from liquid latex versus sheet latex in the hands of a skilled artisan, liquid latex is cured via air drying while sheet latex is cured by being vulcanized. This makes the two forms slightly different. Due to the difference in curing, liquid latex can be applied to sheet latex clothing to add unique patterns and designs, which can be peeled off the sheet latex afterwards.

Neither molded nor sheet-based latex is amenable to large-scale mass production. Skilled manual artistry is an integral part of the process; this means that made-to-measure and special designs are much more accessible to the general buyer, in looking at fetish latex, than is the case with regular textiles.

== Use in clothing ==
Latex has been used to make leotards, bodysuits, stockings and gloves, besides other garments. Latex is also often used to make specialist fetishistic garments like hoods and rubber cloaks.

Latex clothing is generally made from large sheets of latex, which are delivered in rolls. The "classic" colour for fetishistic latex clothing is black, but latex is naturally translucent and may be dyed any colour, including metallic shades or white. It can come in thicknesses which generally range from about 0.18 millimetres (1/100 inch) to 0.5 millimetres (1/50 inch). Instead of being sewn, latex clothing is generally glued along its seams.

Because latex sheet is relatively weak, latex clothing needs special care to avoid tearing. While latex can be repaired using materials similar to those provided in a bicycle repair kit, the result is rarely as attractive as the original appearance of the garment.

Latex clothing is often polished to preserve and improve its shiny appearance.

Putting on latex clothing can be difficult, because latex has high friction against dry skin. To make it easier to put on, wearers often use talc to reduce friction against the skin when putting the clothes on; then, because stray talc is very visible against the rubber, wearers generally polish off any visible talc. Another method of dressing is using lubricant (lube) which provides a slippery surface for the latex to glide over. A third method of reducing or eliminating the high friction of latex when dressing is to chlorinate the rubber. Chlorine in gaseous form is generated by the reaction of hydrochloric acid and sodium hypochlorite. This chlorine bonds to the first few molecules on the surface of the isoprene (latex) and transforms them into neoprene. This process affects metallic colours, but does not affect strength.

Latex may also be painted directly onto the body as latex in liquid form, which is also sometimes used to close seams in the creation of latex clothing. Removal of a painted on liquid latex garment can result in painful hair removal. Wearers avoid this by preparing the skin by prior hair removal, the use of release agents to prevent the latex adhering to the hair, or using products such as orange oil to weaken the latex during removal.

== Use in fetish community ==
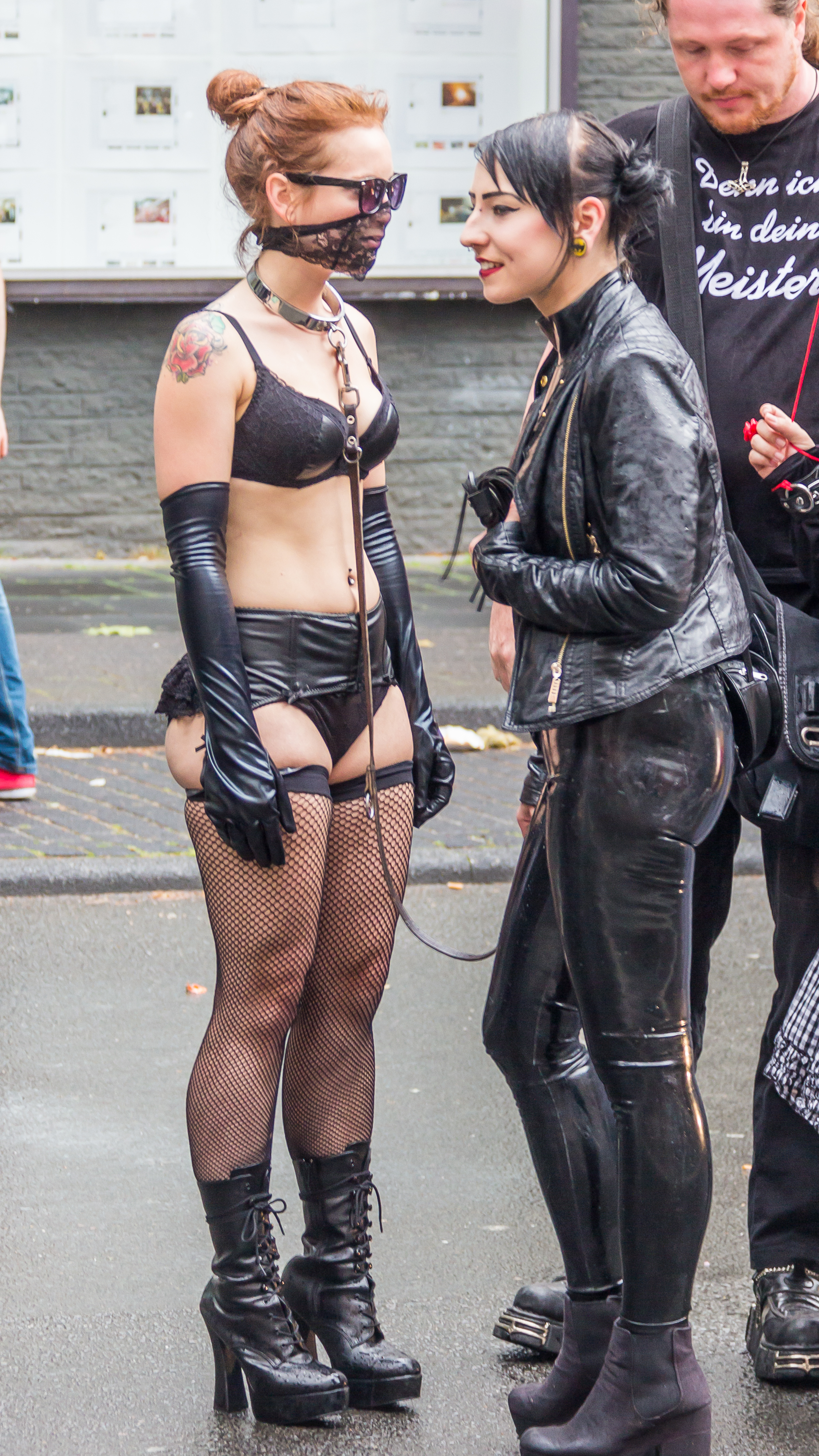
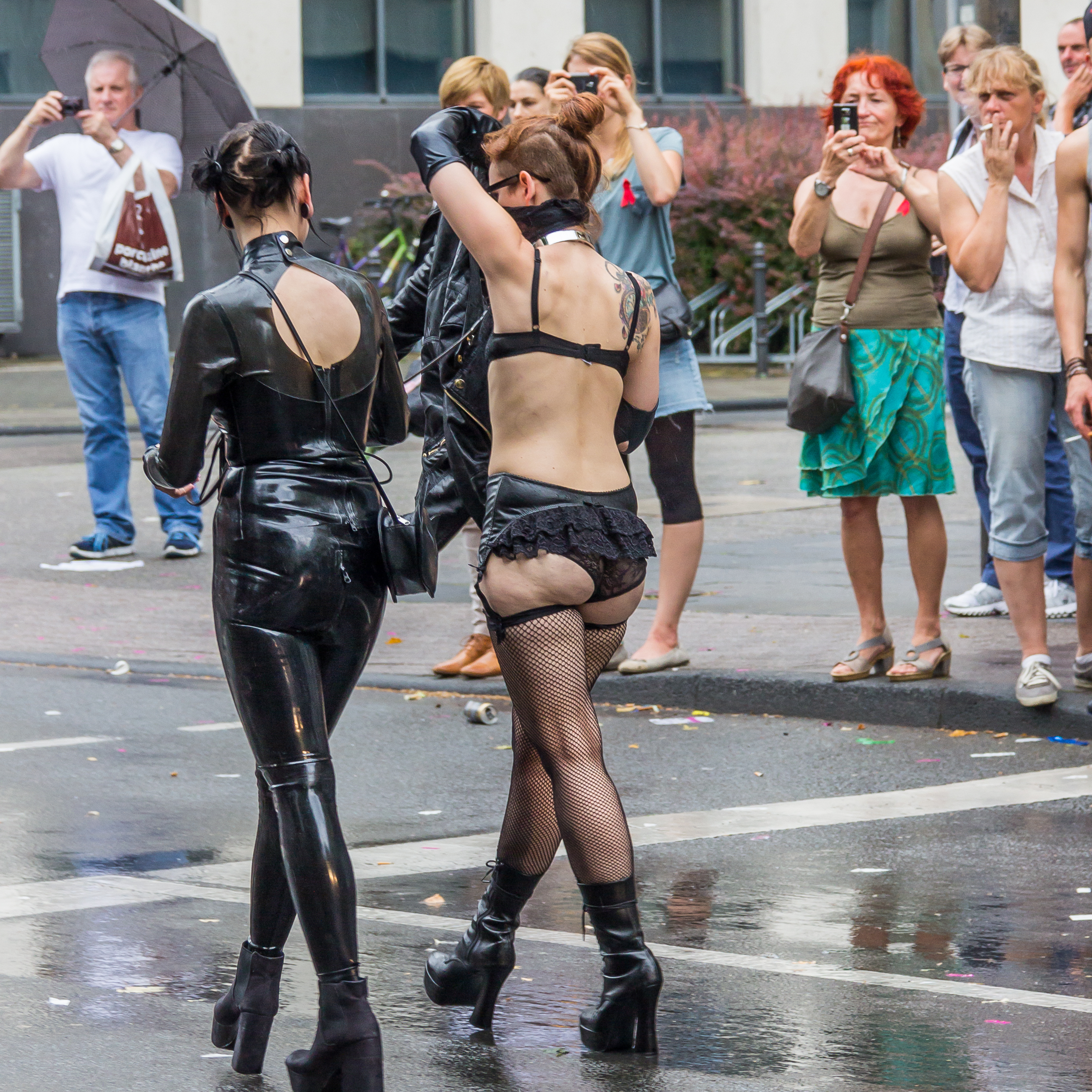
Latex and PVC fetishism: A dominatrix wearing latex catsuit along with her submissive in undergarments, at Cologne Pride, 2014.

Latex clothing is a popular feature of the BDSM community. Latex or rubber fetishists sometimes refer to themselves as "rubberists". One reason why latex or other tight shiny fabrics may be fetishised is perhaps that the garment forms a "second skin" that acts as a fetishistic surrogate for the wearer's own skin. Thus, wearers of skin-tight latex or PVC garments may be perceived by the viewer as being naked, or simply coated in a shiny substance like paint. Latex can also be polished to be shiny and can also be produced in bright colours, adding further visual stimulus to add to the physical sensations produced by the material. The tightness of the garments may also be viewed as a kind of sexual bondage.

== In popular culture ==
Use of latex clothing has been popularized by media appearances, such as the outfit of Catwoman, a cat burglar, in Batman Returns. Popular celebrities Kim Kardashian, Lady Gaga, Kylie Jenner, Pamela Anderson, Shania Twain, Eliza Dushku, and Emma Watson have also worn latex in publicity events or hangouts.

- In the Batman film series, Batman's costume is made of rubber; in Batman Returns, Catwoman wears a rubber catsuit.
- In recent years, latex and PVC have appeared in the media, in TV series like Alias; in music videos by pop stars like Britney Spears, Lady Gaga, and Thalía; and even in fashion trends.
- During New York Fashion Week 2022, fashion house Balenciaga featured models wearing latex suits and hoods underneath their clothing.
- In the Bollywood film Bang Bang (2014) title track video, Katrina Kaif wore a latex dress

== See also ==
- Fetish fashion
- Leather subculture
- Lolita fashion
- Modest fashion
- PVC clothing
- Swim cap
