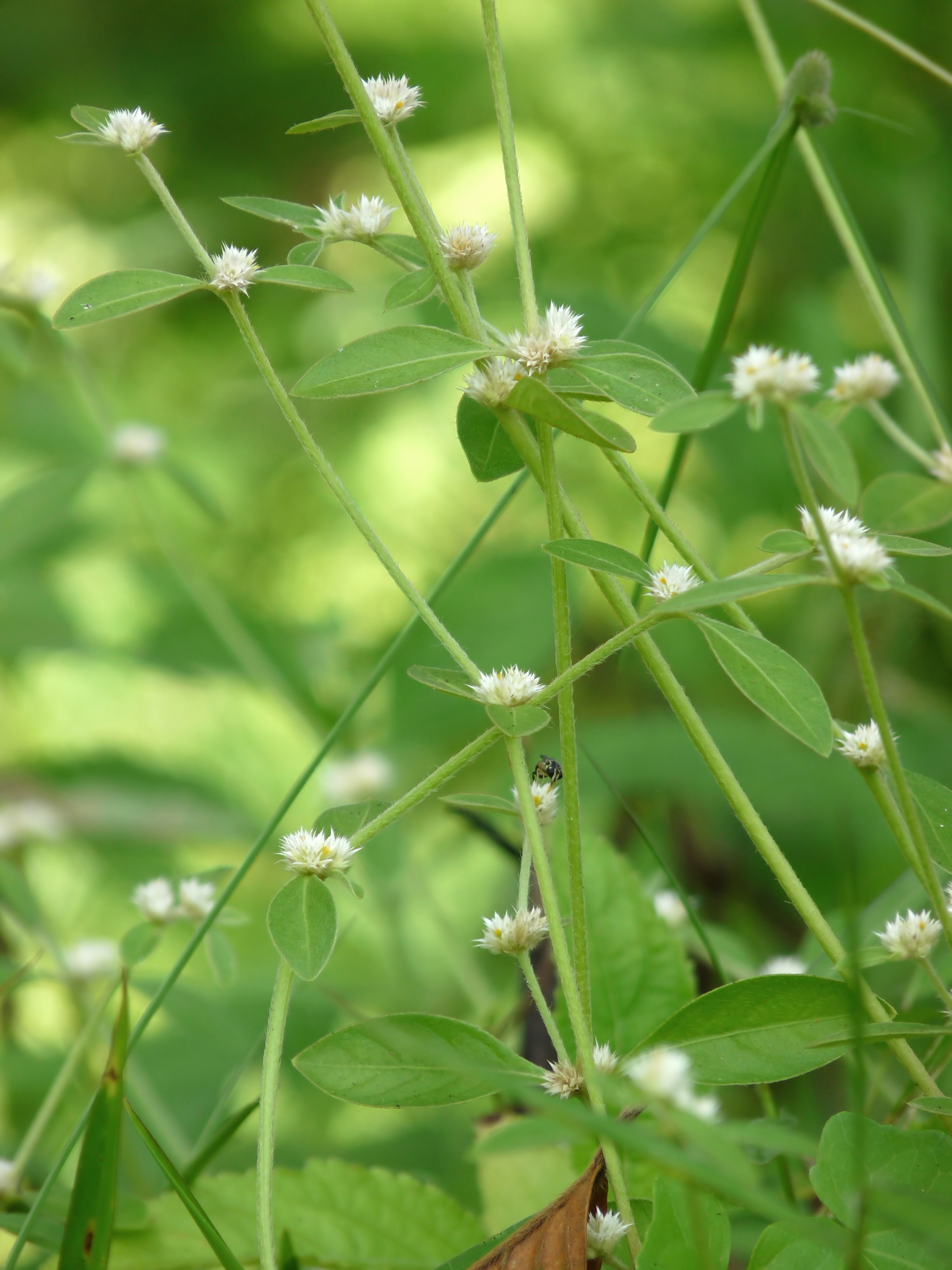

Conservation status
- Least Concern (IUCN 3.1)

Scientific classification
- Kingdom: Plantae
- Clade: Tracheophytes
- Clade: Angiosperms
- Clade: Eudicots
- Order: Caryophyllales
- Family: Amaranthaceae
- Genus: Alternanthera
- Species: A. sessilis

Binomial name
- Alternanthera sessilis (L.) R.Br. ex DC.

Synonyms
- Alternanthera denticulata R. Brown; Alternanthera glabra; Alternanthera nodiflora R. Brown; Gomphrena sessilis L.; Illecebrum sessile L.

= Alternanthera sessilis =

Species of flowering plant

Alternanthera sessilis is a flowering plant known by several common names, including sissoo spinach, Brazilian spinach, sessile joyweed, dwarf copperleaf. It is cultivated as a vegetable worldwide.

== Distribution ==
The plant occurs throughout the tropical and subtropical regions of the Old World. It has been introduced to the southern United States, and its origins in Central and South America are uncertain.

This species is classified as a weed in parts of the southern states of the US. It is usually (but not always especially in areas of high humidity where it can even be a garden weed) found in wet or damp spots.

== Description ==
This is a perennial herb with prostrate stems, rarely ascending, often rooting at the nodes. Leaves obovate to broadly elliptic, occasionally linear-lanceolate, 1–15 cm long, 0.3–3 cm wide, glabrous to sparsely villous, petioles 1–5 mm long. Flowers in sessile spikes, bract and bracteoles shiny white, 0.7–1.5 mm long, glabrous; sepals equal, 2.5–3 mm long, outer ones 1-nerved or indistinctly 3-nerved toward base; stamens 5, 2 sterile. In the wild it flowers from December until March.

== Uses ==
The plant grows wild, but is also cultivated for food, herbal medicines, and as an ornamental plant. The aquarium plant Alternanthera reineckii is sometimes misidentified as A. sessilis.

In certain regions of South East Asia, the leaves and young shoots are consumed as vegetables. In South Asia the leaves, flowers and tender stems are consumed as vegetables. The plants are shredded finely and stir fried with grated coconut and spices to make a salad-like dish that is most commonly eaten as a rice accompaniment.

The leaves are crunchy, slightly more so than the temperate climate spinach, and not slimy. Some cultivars are slightly bitter. They require steaming or boiling when eaten in large quantities because of the presence of oxalates. It is eaten alone as a green or added to other dishes as a spinach substitute. Reportedly, Brazilians usually eat it raw in salads with oil and or vinegar, tomato, and onion, although the literature recommends cooking it. The vegetable can be added to quiches, pies, curries, dals, pasta sauces, lasagna or added to dishes and stir-fries late in the cooking process as a spinach substitute and to add a nutty flavour.

As a herbal medicine, the plant has diuretic, cooling, tonic and laxative properties. It has been used for the treatment of dysuria and haemorrhoids. The plant is also believed to be beneficial for the eyes, and is used as an ingredient in the making of medicinal hair oils and kajal.

== Sissoo spinach ==
Sissoo spinach is a Brazilian cultivar of Alternanthera sessilis. It is used as a planta alimentícia não convencional (non-conventional food plant) in South America. It may be referred to scientifically as Alternanthera sissoo hort., though this name is not validly published.

Sissoo spinach is a vigorous and spreading groundcover about 30 cm (12 in) high with crinkly leaves, rooting at the nodes. It does not set viable seed and is not considered invasive. It prefers 50% or more shade and tolerates a wide range of pH soil conditions, though it needs a high amount of nitrogen, organic matter and water. Plants are prone to leaf-eating caterpillar pests and slugs. It can be planted as a living mulch under fruit trees. Plants are propagated with softwood cuttings.

== Gallery ==
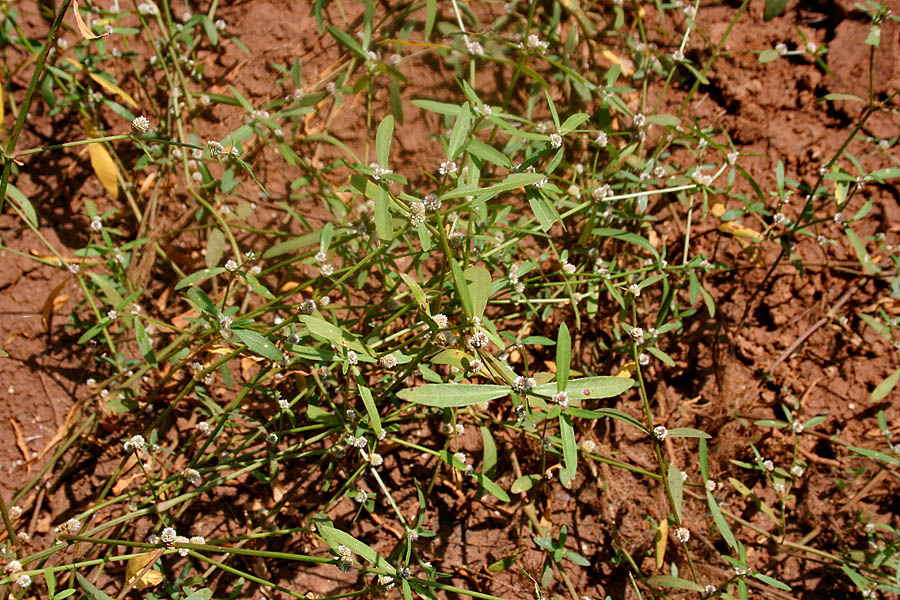

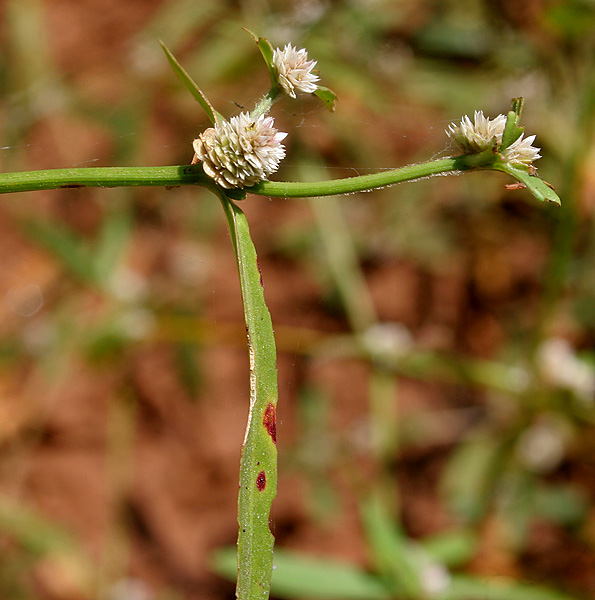

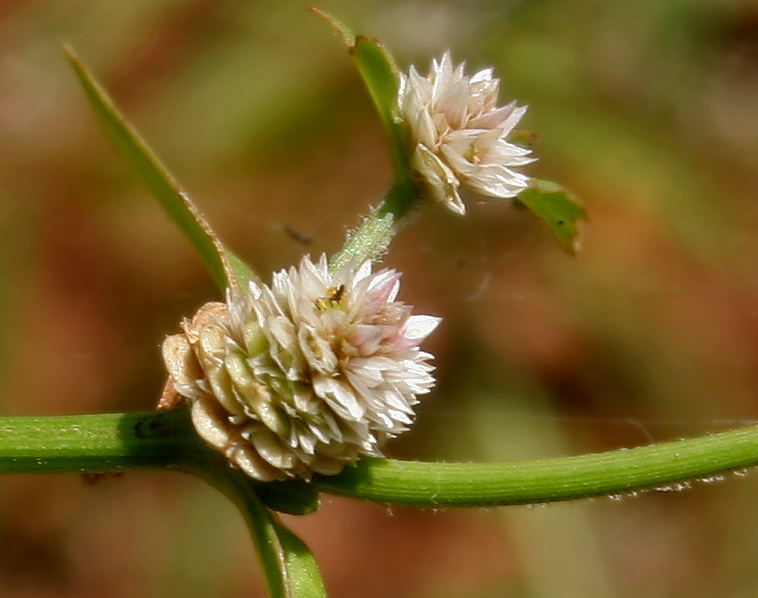

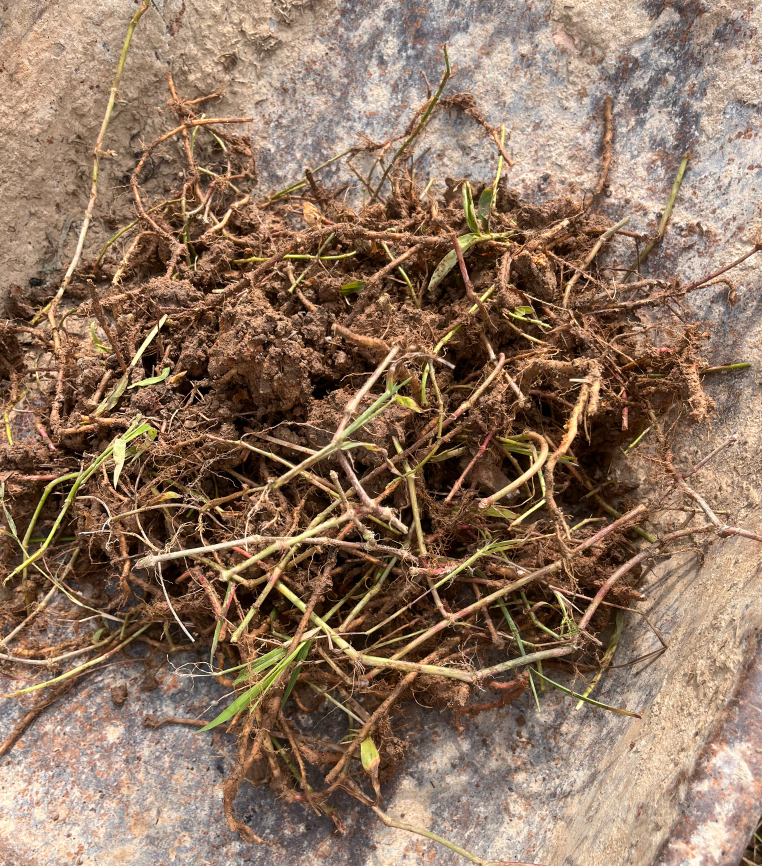

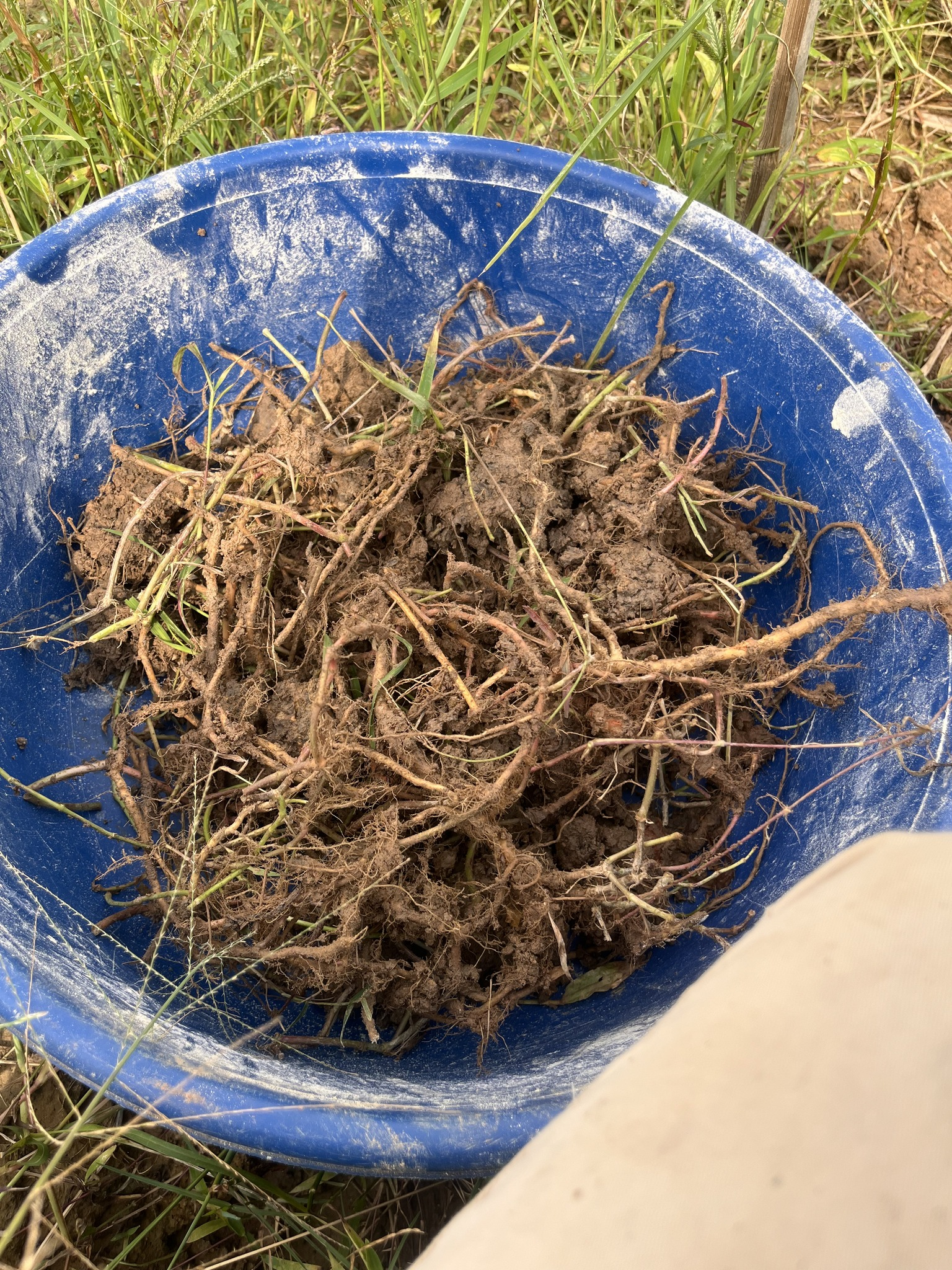
