= Jean Roule =

- First appearance: Les Mauvais bergers (1897)
- Created by: Octave Mirbeau

In-universe information
- Nickname: Jean Roule
- Species: Human
- Gender: Male
- Occupation: Worker, anarchist
- Relatives: Madeleine
- Nationality: French

Jean Roule is the main fictional character in Octave Mirbeau’s proletarian tragedy, Les Mauvais Bergers (The Bad Shepherds) (1897). During the first performance, Lucien Guitry played the role of Jean Roule.

== A militant anarchist ==
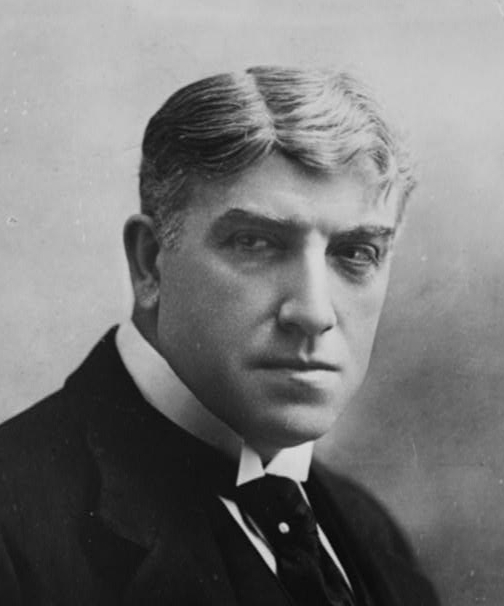
Lucien Guitry

As suggested by the name he adopts symbolically, Jean Roule is a rouleur, that is a proleterian with no attachments, who slogs away whenever he finds work, but does not put down roots. He is also a militant libertarian, who, wherever he goes, tries to raise the consciousness of his brothers in misery, the workers, often too exhausted from their work and too fatalistic to actively involve themselves in the struggle to change their status as slaves, for example, the elder Thieux who, at the beginning of the play, has lost his wife, worn out and destroyed by her work.

This is what Jean Roule does upon his arrival at the Hargand factory, from which infernal smoke ascends, and more specifically, by converting to his ideal the young Madeleine, Thieux’s daughter, who reacts with sensitivity to his sincerity, his solidarity with the miners, and his charisma. He ends up persuading his co-workers to stage a strike, in hopes of achieving through their struggle, not only tangible improvements to salaries, working conditions, and workplace safety, but also the right to culture and beauty.

Unfortunately, the boss Hargand proves inflexible, hunger grips the strikers, and Jean Roule makes the mistake of refusing help offered by socialist deputies, who are no more in his eyes than mauvais bergers (bad sheperds) desiring only to "maintain and increase their electoral power". Jean Roule then risks being lynched by members of the angry crowd, who blame him for the failure of their struggle, but he is saved by the intervention of Madeleine. When armed soldiers, called on by Hargand, fire on the unarmed crowd, however, Jean Roule is killed, and Madeleine, pregnant and wounded, dies, collapsing on his cadavre; Jean Roule’s child, who could have embodied hope for a future emancipation of the workers, dies with its mother.

Octave Mirbeau, who was also an anarchist, shared the claims put forward by Jean Roule and he admired his energy, his determination and his sacrifice. But he nevertheless considered him to be yet another mauvais berger because, through his instransigeance and refusal of all compromise, he leads the workers to their deaths.
