= IMbesharam =

Indian online sex shop

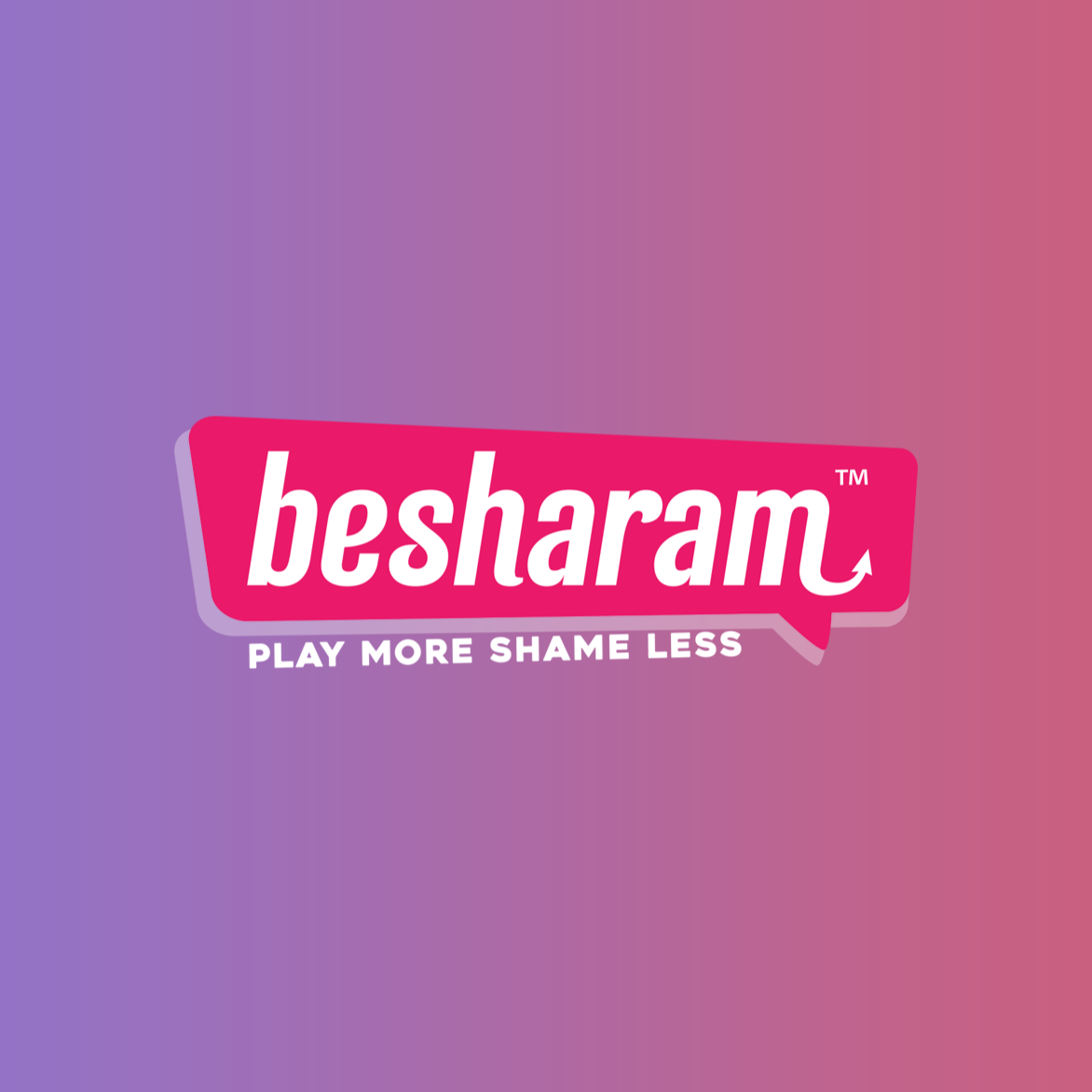
- Industry: E-commerce
- Founded: 2013
- Founder: Raj Armani and Salim Rajan
- Website: in.imbesharam.com

IMbesharam is an Indian e-commerce website that sells sex toys, sexual wellness products and accessories. It was founded in 2013 by Raj Armani and Salim Rajan. The website sells sex toys, vibrator, butt plug, dildo, accessories such as lingerie and strap-ons, sexual wellness products such as lubricants and condoms, and other products such as games and edible underwear.

== Founding ==
IMbesharam was founded in 2013 by entrepreneurs Salim Rajan and Raj Armani in response to the lack of comprehensive online resources catering to adult needs in India.

== Business model ==
According to a 2020 article by Mint, three of the brand's five best-selling products were female vibrators. Among the company's customers, 54% were women and 46% were men. According to a 2022 estimate, the company was projected to exceed ₹400 million in sales by 2023.

In 2022, IMBesharam provided seed funding to the Sangya Project, an Indian sex-tech startup, to manufacture inexpensive sexual wellness products and sex toys in India.

In February 2026, IMbesharam CEO Raj Armani appeared on the Dr. Cuterus podcast, produced by iDiva, India's largest women's lifestyle network, to discuss the Indian sexual wellness market. Armani stated that the sex toy market in India had doubled every seven to eight months since 2020, compared to a global average of doubling every six years.

In February 2026, IMbesharam participated as an official vendor at Zepto Prom Night, a consumer event held in India, where the company set up a product experience hub.

== Cooperations ==
IMbesharam has partnered with Lovense. Additionally, IMbesharam has partnered withadult actress Sunny Leone to launch exclusive product lines and promotional campaigns.

== Awards ==
In 2015, IMbesharam won the XBIZ Award for Online Retailer of the Year – Boutique.

In January 2026, IMbesharam won the XMA Award for Online Retailer of the Year at the 2026 XMA ceremony held at the Hollywood Palladium in Los Angeles.
