= Panc =

Panc or PANC may refer to:

- Panc, a village in Dobra, Hunedoara Commune, Romania
- Ted Stevens Anchorage International Airport, Alaska, United States (ICAO airport code: PANC)
- Plantas Alimentícias Não Convencionais, a plant-related movement in Brazil
