= Diana Slip =

French manufacturer of lingerie and fetishwear

Diana Slip was an early 20th-century French manufacturer of lingerie and fetishwear, founded by Léon (also known as Victor) Vidal, the publisher of Les Éditions Gauloises. The company opened a luxurious boutique by the upmarket Quartier de la Madeleine in Paris, between the rue Royale and the Place Vendôme. They employed renowned photographers of the time, including Roger Schall and Brassaï, to photograph their products. Their main competitor was Yva Richard.
