= Yva Richard =

20th century French fetishwear company

Yva Richard was a French fetishwear company of the early 20th century, run by Nativa Richard and her husband L. Richard. They founded the company a few weeks before the outbreak of World War I. By the late 1920s, it had become a successful mail-order business. One of their most notorious designs was a studded steel cone bra and chastity belt with a plumed headdress. The Ricards also worked with the Biederers' Ostra Studio. who provided photography for their mail-order catalogue La Lingerie Moderne.

Yva Ricard's main competitor was Diana Slip, which flourished in the same inter-war time period. Both companies ceased following the Nazi invasion of France.

Charles Guyette was influenced by the work of Yva Ricard.
