= Edible =

Item safe for human consumption

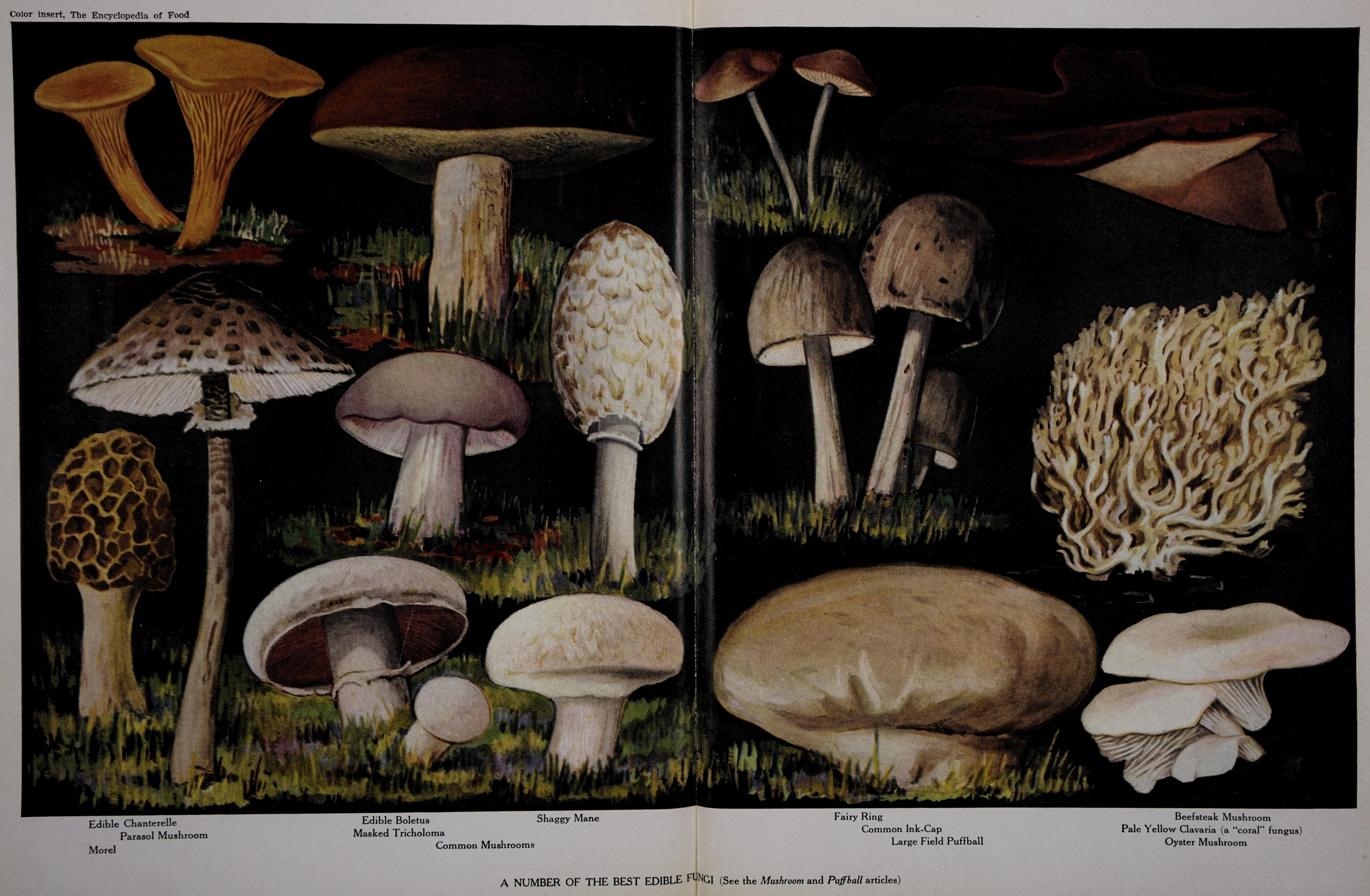
A Number of the Best Edible Fungi, illustration from The Encyclopedia of Food by Artemas Ward, 1923

An edible item is one that is safe for humans to eat. "Edible" is different from "eatable", as it does not indicate how an item tastes, only whether it can safely be eaten. Nonpoisonous items found in nature – such as some mushrooms, insects, seaweed, and so forth – are referred to as edible. Processed items that normally are not ingested but are specially manufactured to be so, like edible underwear or edible packaging, are also labeled as edible.

== Edible items in nature ==
Humans eat thousands of plant species; there may be as many as 75,000 edible species of angiosperms, of which perhaps 7,000 are often eaten.

Edible plants found in nature include flowers, seeds, berries, seaweed, and cacti. Being able to identify the versions of these plants that are safe to eat is an important survival skill. Some fungi, including certain types of mushrooms, are also edible.

Many animals are also edible, including domesticated livestock as well as wild insects, amphibians, reptiles, birds and mammals. Advocates of the increase in consumption of edible insects cite the environmental benefits of being able to raise more food using less land while producing fewer greenhouse emissions. More than 1,900 insect species have been documented as being used for food, including ants and beetle larvae in the diets of some African and Australian tribes, and crispy-fried locusts and beetles eaten as street food in parts of Thailand.

== Etymology ==
The term "edible" dates back to the 1590s. It originates from the Latin word "edibilis" (eatable), which comes from the word "edere" (to eat), which comes from the prefix "ed-" (to eat).
