= Studio Biederer =

French atelier for photography in the time of Art déco

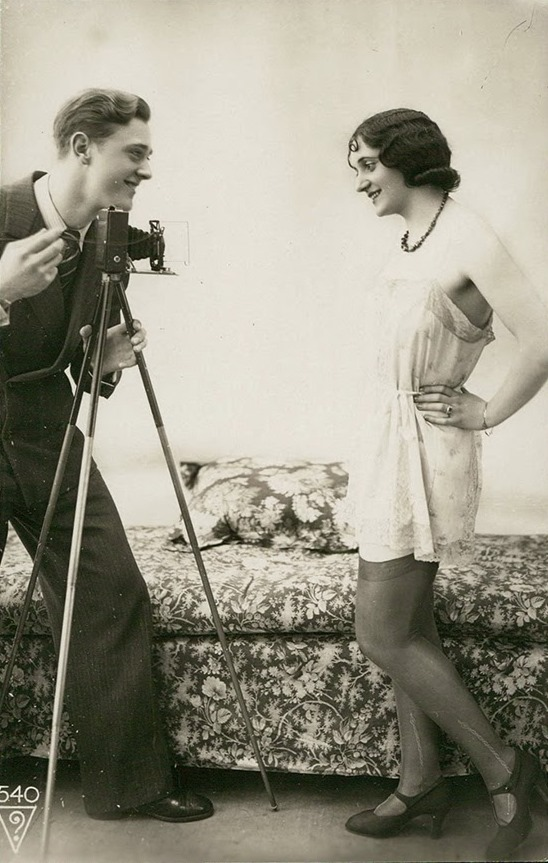
Photo from Studio Biederer

Studio Biederer (also known as Biederer Studio) was a French studio for erotic photography, managed by the Czech brothers Jacques Biederer (born 1887; died c. 1942) and Charles Biederer (born 1892; died c. 1942).

Very closely related to Studio Biederer was the quasi-distinct Ostra Studio, founded in an attempt to create a separate publishing house. In practice, however, Ostra Studio only ever functioned as a subdivision of Studio Biederer, with both studios referred to as separate yet intertwined divisions under a single management that effectively functioned as Studio Biederer. Although identifying works by Jacques Biederer is not difficult, distinguishing between those published by Studio Biederer and those specifically produced under the Ostra Studio label is more challenging.

The primary content of Biederer/Ostra was female nudes, female bondage and erotic spanking. Erotic spanking images were predominantly all female, although some were produced that featured men spanking women and women spanking men.

== History ==
Jacques and Charles Biederer were born in a Jewish family. Their father was Maurice (Moritz) Biederer and their mother was Augustine "Gusti" Biederer. Their siblings were their brothers Emanuel and Hugo and their sister was Rosa.

In 1908 Jacques relocated to Paris where he founded a photography studio, with Charles following in 1913 to most probably assist him as a photographer. The studio was situated at 33 Boulevard du Temple, Paris.

Ostra Studio was established in the late 1930s to publish Éditions Ostra, albums of photosets based around erotic themes. The Ostra Studio also did commercial photography for erotic books and Yva Richard’s mail-order catalogue La Lingerie Moderne. The brothers named the Ostra Studio in homage to their hometown – Moravska-Ostrava.

In the 1930s, Biederer was amongst the first to produce BDSM stag reels. The exact number is unknown, but at least three works are known to have been produced and survived: Dressage au Fouet (Raising with the Whip), Sous Les Caresses du Martinet (Under the Caresses of the Martinet), and La Vase Brise (The Broken Vase). Erotic spanking is a feature of all three.

During the German occupation of France, the brothers, who were of Jewish descent, were arrested. Charles was deported with transport 4 from Pithiviers transit camp to Auschwitz-Birkenau on 25 June 1942. Jacques was deported with transport 6 from Pithiviers to Birkenau on 17 July 1942.

Biederer was a forerunner of later photographers and artists with similar interests, such as Charles Guyette, John Willie, and Irving Klaw.

== Gallery ==
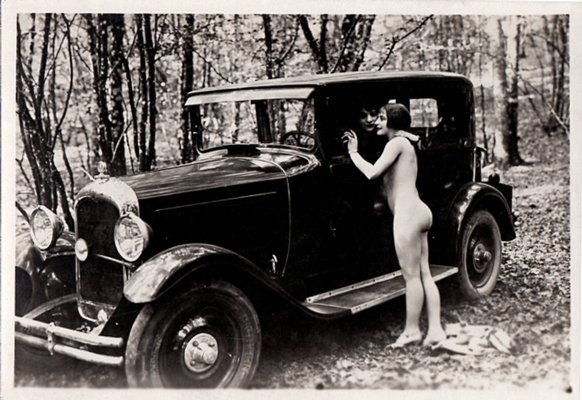
A nude woman leaning against a car

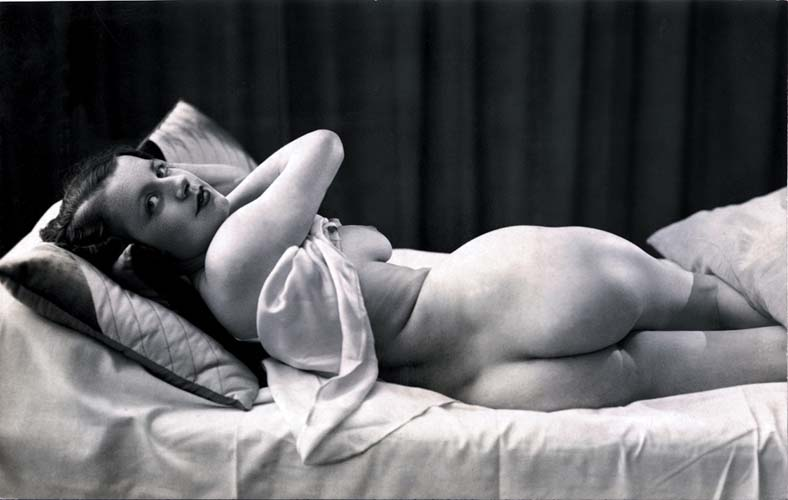
A woman lying on a bed, exposing her buttocks

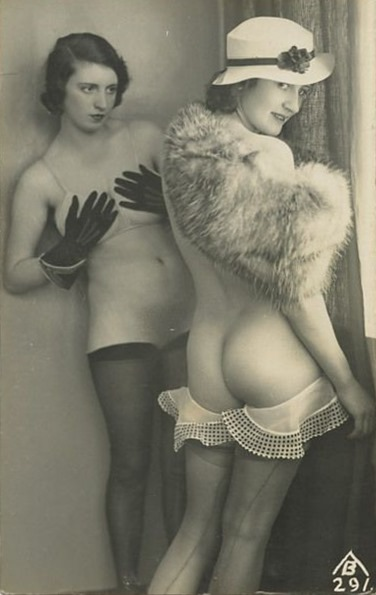
Two partially nude women, both wearing stockings. Left is wearing gloves and covering her breasts, while right is presenting her buttocks.

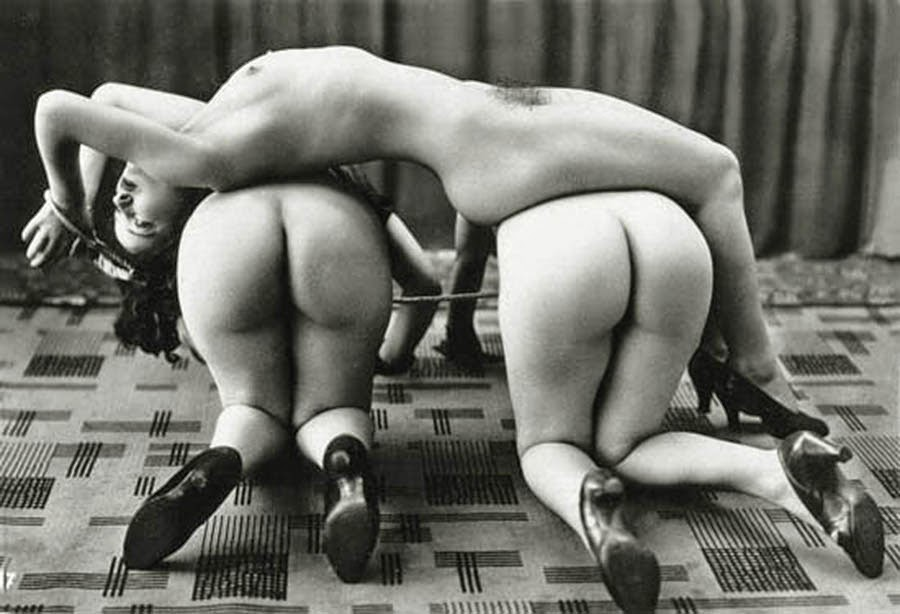
Three nude women, featuring bondage

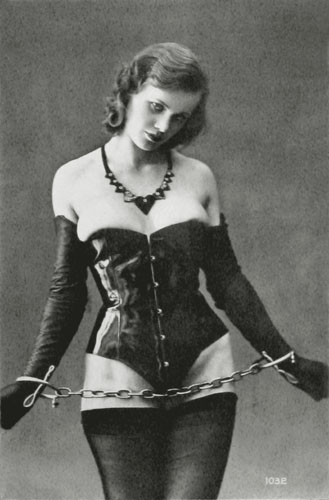
A woman in a corset and chains

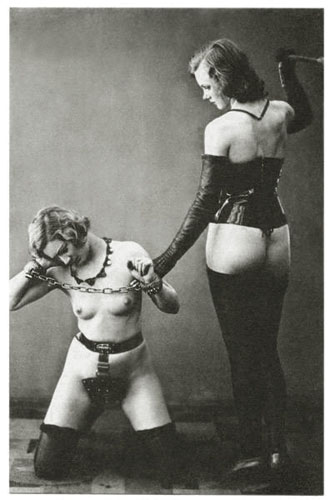
A kneeling woman in handcuffs and wearing a chastity belt, with a dominatrix standing above her

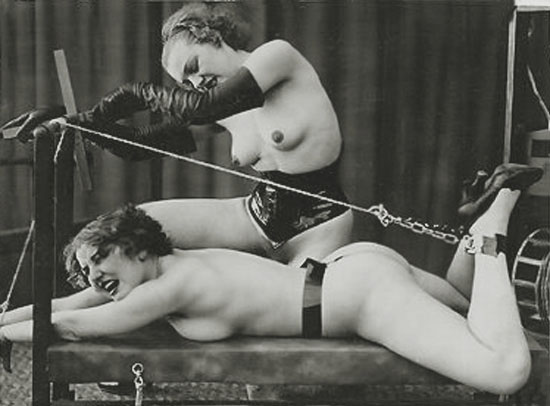
A dominatrix and a woman restrained to bondage furniture

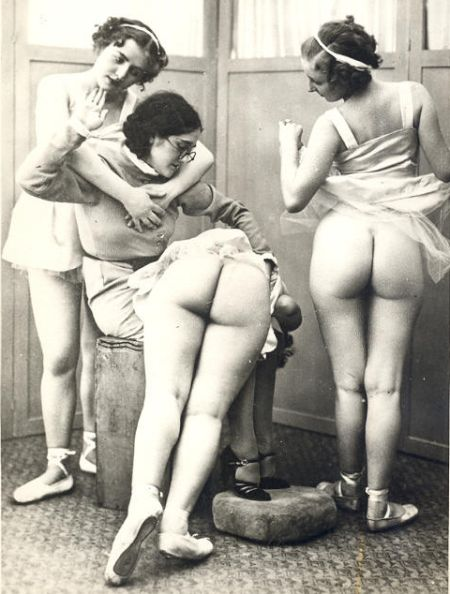
Three women dressed for ballet, one being hand spanked

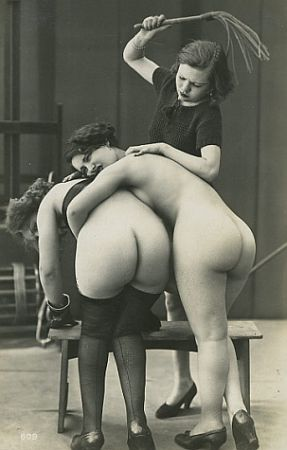
Two women being spanked by another

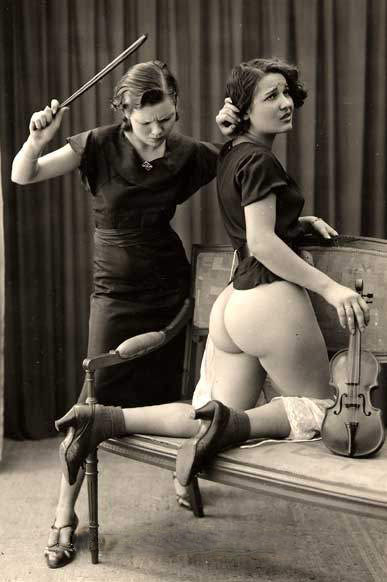
A woman spanking another woman with a violin bow, a notably unconventional implement

== See also ==
- Erotic photography
- List of photographers

== Sources ==
- Alexandre Dupouy: Les éditions Ostra, L'age d'or du fétichisme. Paris: Éditions Astarté, 2007, ISBN 9782909607191
