= Les Mauvais Bergers =

1898 play written by Octave Mirbeau

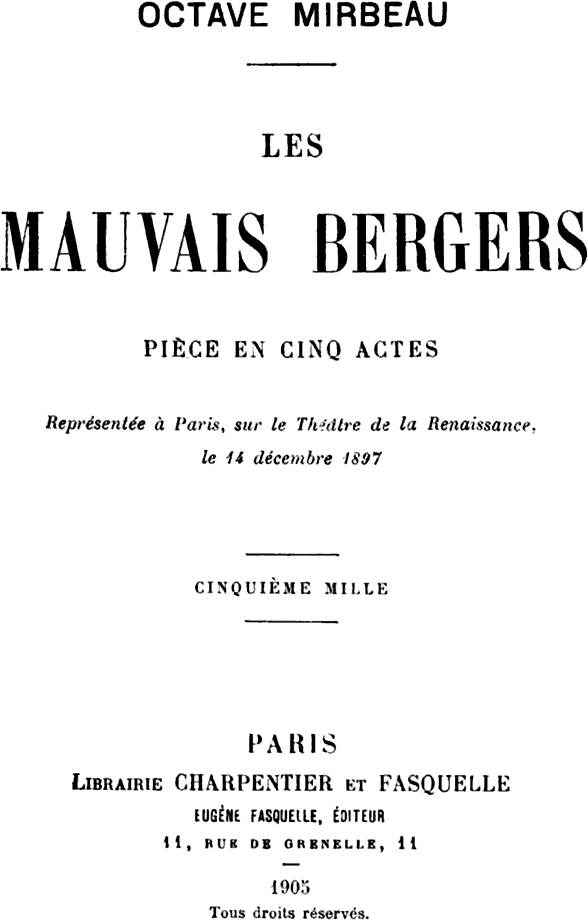

Les Mauvais Bergers (The Bad Shepherds) is a modern tragedy, in five acts, by the French journalist, novelist and playwright Octave Mirbeau, performed in December 1897 on the stage of Théâtre de la Renaissance, in Paris, then published by Charpentier-Fasquelle in March 1898. The main parts were played by the two most famous French actors at the time: Sarah Bernhardt, as Madeleine, and Lucien Guitry, as Jean Roule.

The play has not been translated into English.

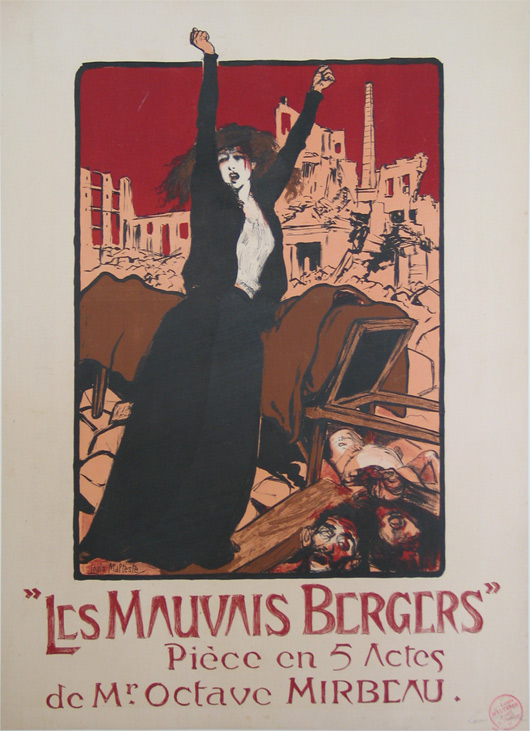
Poster by Louis Malteste, 1897.

== Plot summary ==
Les Mauvais Bergers is the story of a workers' strike, which is opposed by the boss, Hargand, and cruelly crushed in blood by the army, in a situation similar to that of Émile Zola's famous novel Germinal. But while Zola's ends on a note of hope, with an imagery evoking future germinations, Octave Mirbeau's play ends in pessimism, with the triumph of death: all the strikers are killed, including Jean Roule, the leader, and his lover, the young and pregnant Madeleine. Even Robert Hargand, the boss' son who supported the strikers and tried to stop the massacre, does not survive. No hope, or possibility of renewal in future generations is left, only certainty there will be no germination.

The play is inspired by anarchist politics, particularly evident in Jean Roule's speeches, yet it neither presents itself as propaganda nor offers a solution to the social question.
