= Fetish fashion =

Extreme or provocative clothing

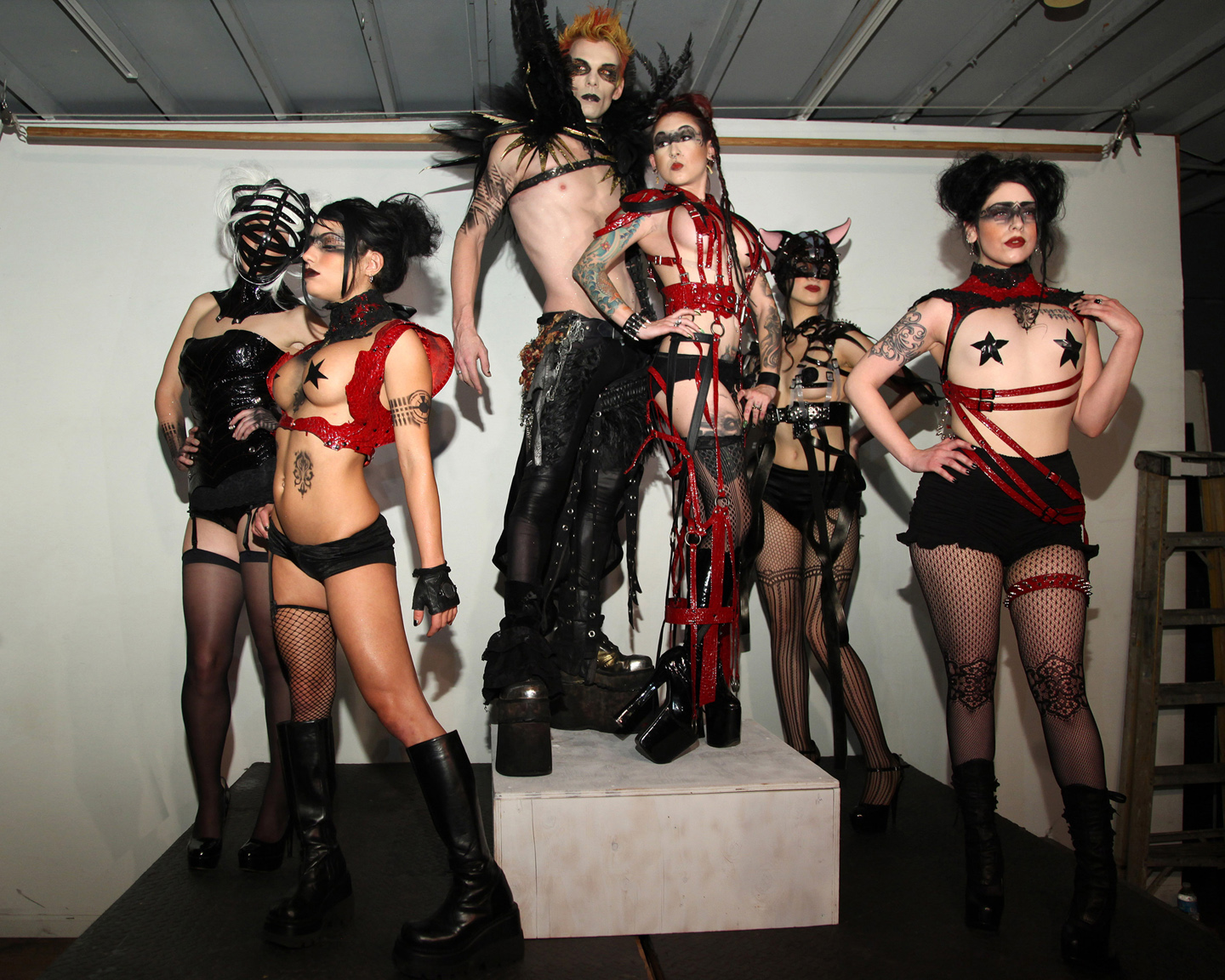
Fetish Fashion designs of latex clothing at the 2012 Los Angeles Fetish Film Festival

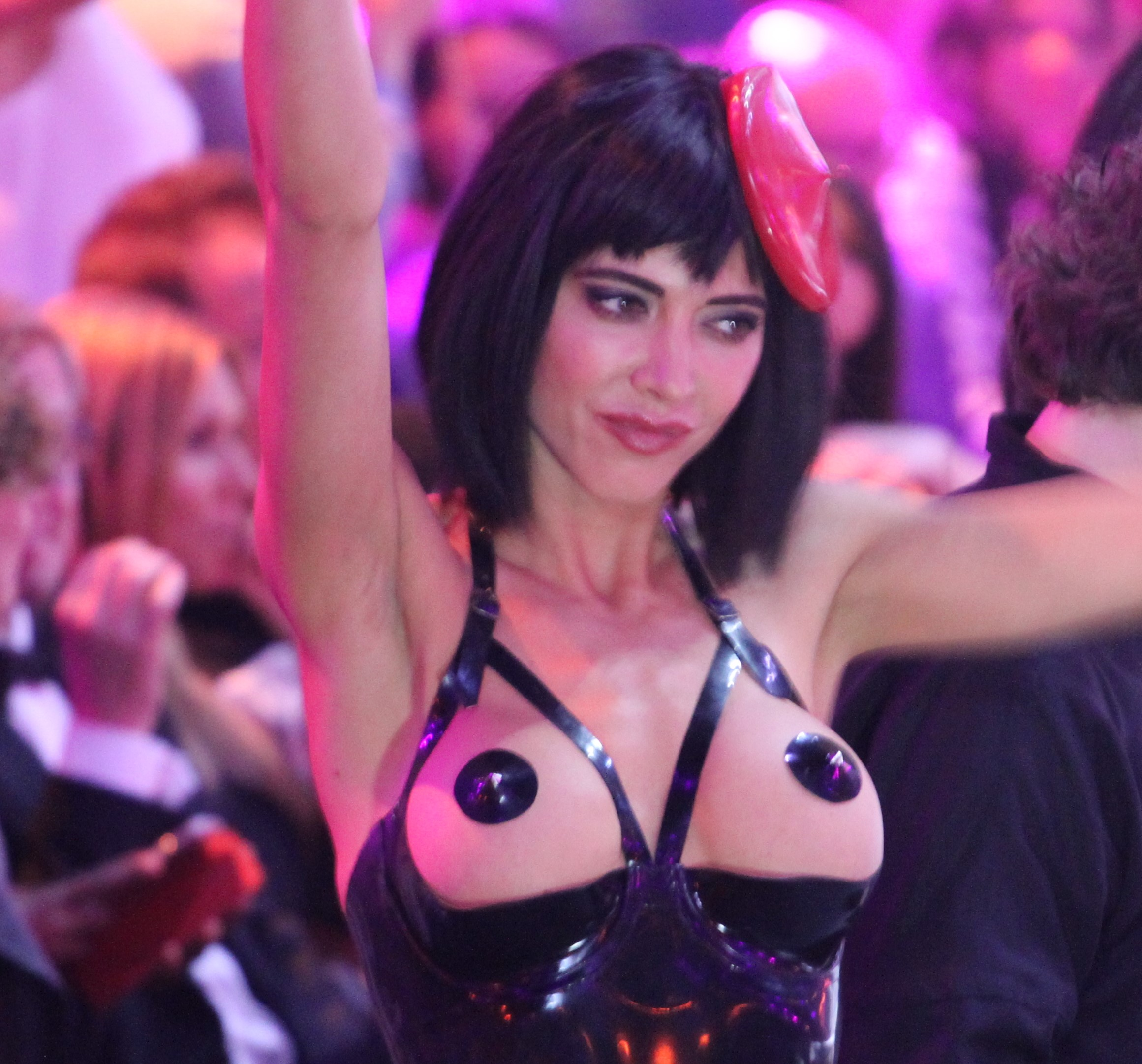
Swiss artist Milo Moiré performs wearing pasties and cut-out bra top, 2016.

Fetish fashion is a range of styles of clothing and fashion accessories derived from the materials, garments and other items used in clothing fetish and other sexual fetish subcultures. They are intended to be extreme, revealing, skimpy or provocative. By definition, most people do not wear these styles; if everyone wears an item, it cannot have a fetishistic, special nature. They are usually made of materials such as leather, latex or synthetic rubber or plastic, nylon, PVC, spandex, fishnet, and stainless steel. Some fetish fashion items include: stiletto heel shoes and boots (most notably the ballet boot), hobble skirts, corsets, collars, full-body latex catsuits, stockings, miniskirt, crotchless underwear, jockstraps, diapers, garters, locks, rings, zippers, eyewear, handcuffs, and stylized costumes based on more traditional outfits, such as wedding dresses that are almost completely see-through lace, or lingerie for men.

Fetish fashions should not be confused with costuming. They both involve clothing and intend to present an image, but a costume is, by definition, something for public view without sexual implications. Fetish fashion is usually for an intimate setting, with sexual implications.

Fetish fashions are usually considered to be separate from those clothing items used in cosplay, whereby these exotic fashions are specifically used as costuming to effect a certain situation rather than to be merely worn, such as the creation of a character for picture play. However, sometimes the two areas do overlap. For example, in Japan, some themed restaurants have waitresses who wear costumes such as a suit made of latex or a stylized French maid or Playboy bunny outfit.

Specialist fetish models often model fashionable clothing.

Some types of garments that women wear to routinely improve their appearance are thought of as erotic and qualify as fetish wear: corsets and high heels. Most fetish wear is not practical enough for routine daily wear. An example of a fetish costume worn by women is the dominatrix costume. This costume typically consists of dark or black garments, including a corset or bustier, stockings, and high-heeled footwear such as thigh-high boots to enhance the dominating appearance. An accessory such as a whip or a riding crop is often carried.

== History ==
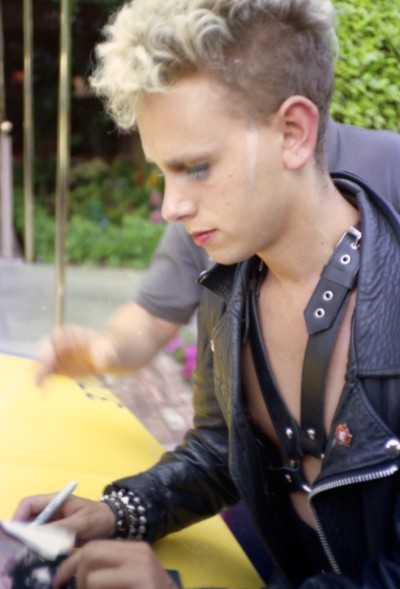
Depeche Mode member Martin Gore signing autographs in 1986, shown wearing a fetish leather harness

Fetish fashion has no specific origin point because certain fashions appreciated specifically for themselves or worn as part of a specific subculture have been noted since the earliest days of clothing. Some scholars, like Michael Hayworth, argue that the use of corsetry and hobble skirts back in the late 19th century was the first mainstream note of fetish fashions because the majority of society did not have access to these articles. These items were specifically appreciated for themselves (i.e. the person liked the woman wearing the corset rather than just the woman by herself).

In 1914 a few weeks before World War One, L. Richard and his wife Nativa founded their lingerie firm, Yva Richard, in Paris. Their custom made unique creations became increasingly daring and avant-garde, and by the late 1920s, they had highly successful international mail-order business. Richard took most of the photographs for their catalogue, and Nativa would sometimes model. One of their most iconic designs was a studded steel cone bra and chastity belt with a plumed headdress. Their success encouraged the tailor Léon Vidal, who owned a chain of erotic bookshops, to open a luxurious lingerie boutique called Diana Slip.

A leather subculture appeared amongst the underground gay community in the United States, with the first gay leather bar opening in 1958 in Chicago. This culture quickly spread worldwide, and became more mainstream in the 1960s due to the influence of rock musicians and television performers such as Diana Rigg and Honor Blackman in The Avengers, who wore full body leather catsuits and full limb-covering leather and latex gloves and boots.

Many fashion designers incorporate elements of the fetish subculture into their creations or directly create products based on elements that the mainstream does not accept. Malcolm McLaren and Vivienne Westwood created several restrictive BDSM-inspired clothing items of punk fashion for the 1970s punk subculture; in particular bondage trousers, which connect the wearer's legs with straps. The more recent fetish clothing makers House of Harlot and Torture Garden Clothing, Breathless of London, Vex Latex Clothing, and Madame S of California focus on using latex and leather as the base material for their creations, rather than as an accessory.

== Publications ==
Fetish fashions became popularized in the United States during the 1950s through books and magazines such as Bizarre and many other underground publications. Skin Two is a contemporary fetish magazine covering many aspects of the worldwide fetish subculture. The name is a reference to fetish clothing as a second skin.

== Influence on mainstream fashion ==
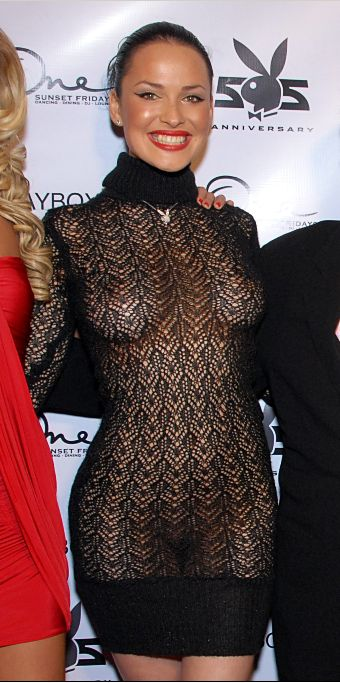
Playmate Dasha Astafieva wearing a see-through fishnet dress without underwear, at a Playboy party in 2008

Fetish fashion has influenced mainstream fashion, both on and off the runway. Many well-known designers have used fetish wear as an inspiration, borrowing details and incorporating materials such as latex, PVC, lace, vinyl and patent leather. Such designers include Thierry Mugler, Jonathan Saunders, Alexander McQueen, Christian Dior, Chanel and Nicholas Kirkwood. The Alexander McQueen Autumn/Winter 2016 ready-to-wear collection was influenced by fetish fashion, and the inspiration for materials and pieces such as harnesses and corsets can be seen in most of the looks.

Other brands have been created specifically for the fetish clothing luxury market. Fleet Ilya, headed by the husband and wife team Ilya Fleet and Resha Sharma, began promoting the co-existence of fashion and BDSM as a symbiotic concept. Early adaptation of their leather harnesses by Sienna Miller in 2006 and Rihanna in 2009 led to an Autumn/Winter 2009 eponymous collection that featured fashion pieces and bondage tools alike. The Restraint by Fleet Ilya exhibition and pop-up shop in collaboration with Rankin followed in 2010. Subsequent collaborations with mainstream brands include Comme des Garçons, Jonathan Saunders and Dion Lee, establishing Fleet Ilya's dedication to blurring the lines between high fashion and fetish wear. Zana Bayne, a post-fetish leather brand based in New York City was founded by Zana Bayne in 2010. Their work has been worn by celebrities such as Beyoncé and Lady Gaga. Zana Bayne has also collaborated with other brands such as Marc Jacobs and Comme des Garçons. Todd Pendu began working with Zana Bayne when he was at Comme des Garçons before becoming a full-time creative partner at Zana Bayne in 2012. Atsuko Kudo is another brand explicitly influenced by fetish fashion, who design and manufacture ladies wear made entirely in latex rubber.

Street fashion has also been influenced by fetish fashion. By late 2016 and through 2017, some fetish fashion elements had appeared in ready-to-wear and streetwear around the world. These elements include items such as chokers, fishnets, corsets, and thigh-high boots; details such as straps, buckles, pierced ring hardware, and chains; and materials like patent leather and vinyl.

== See also ==
- Charles Guyette
- Eric Stanton
- Fetish magazine
- Gene Bilbrew
- Going commando
- Gothic fashion
- Industrial fashion
- Leather subculture
- Irving Klaw
- John Willie
- Kink (sexuality)

Dance Culture

- Body art
- Clubbing
- Fetish club

Clothing

- Edible underwear
- Latex clothing
- Rubber and PVC fetishism
- Spandex fetishism
- Underwear as outerwear
- Uniform fetishism
