= Louis Malteste =

French writer and painter (1862–1928)

Jules Malteste, known as Louis Malteste (1862–1928) was a French writer, painter, engraver, lithographer, draughtsman, and illustrator, commonly known for his depictions of spanking.

== Life ==
Malteste was born on 14 September 1862 in Chartres (Eure-et-Loir). He lived and worked in Paris, where he exhibited in 1897 at the Salon des Cent, and in 1902 at the Salon de la Société Nationale des Beaux-Arts. He worked for humorous publications, such as L'Assiette au beurre, Le Chat noir, Je sais tout, Lectures pour tous, and Qui lit rit, and created posters and postcards. He was also published in La Plume in 1897.

Louis Malteste also used the pseudonyms Ignotus and Jacques d'Icy, and under the latter name, he wrote spanking novels such as Paulette Trahie ("Paulette Betrayed", 1922). His first two books were entitled Qui aime bien (1912) and Châtie bien (1913). “Qui aime bien châtie bien” ("Who loves well, punishes well") is a French proverb that roughly corresponds to the English proverb, “Spare the rod and spoil the child.”

Malteste died on 25 January 1928 in Paris.

== Works ==
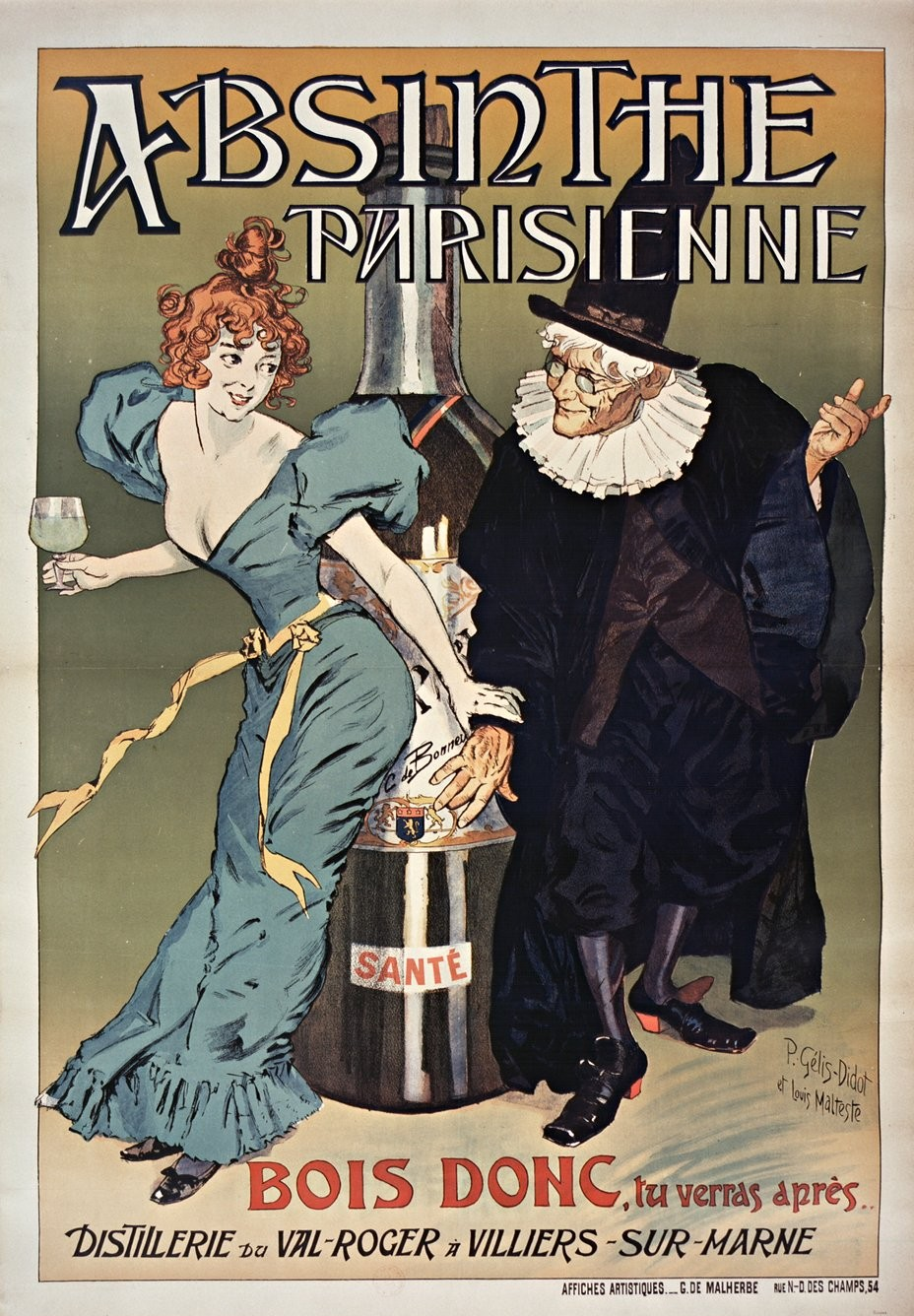
Absinthe Parisienne (1896)

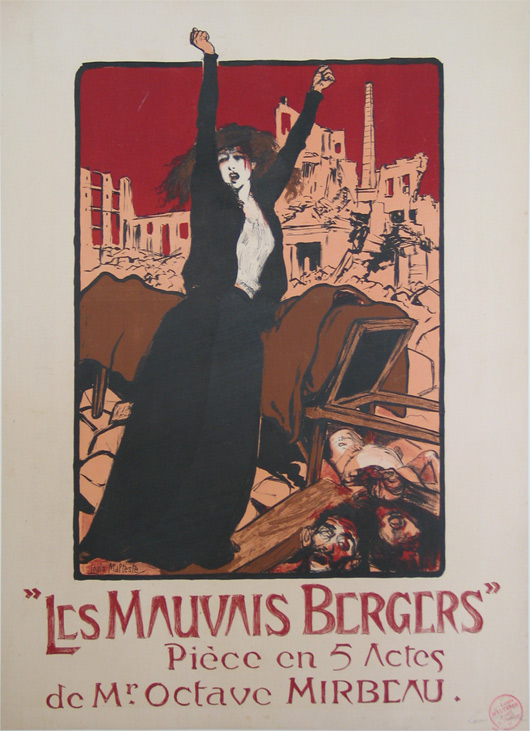
Les Mauvais Bergers (1897)

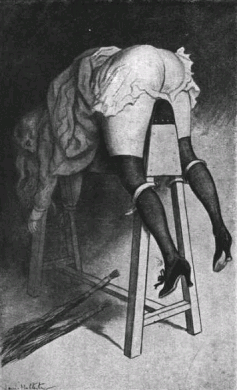
Woman on Spanking Bench (1910)

=== Posters ===
- Absinthe Parisienne. Bois donc, tu verras après (1896) with P. Gélis-Didot (1853–?), lithograph printed by the Affiches Parisiennes.
- Les Mauvais Bergers, play in 5 acts by Octave Mirbeau (1897).
- Les Misérables after Victor Hugo (1912), film by Albert Capellani, with Henri Krauss.
- Le Petit Jacques (1913), film by Georges Monca, with Henri Étiévant.
- Le Chevalier de Maison Rouge (1914), film d'Albert Capellani.
- Les Effluves funestes (1916), film by Camille de Morlhon, Pathé Frères.
- Le Chemineau (1935?), film by Fernand Rivers.
- P.L.M. La Côte d'Azur à 13 heures de Paris par trains extra-rapides (n.d.).
- Théâtre Antoine, théâtre à bon marché, also printed as a postcard (n.d.).
- Les Apaches de Paris (n.d.).

=== Novels ===
- Qui aime bien (Paris: Jean Fort, Collection des Orties Blanches, 1916).
- Châtie bien (Paris: Jean Fort, Collection des Orties Blanches, 1916).
- Monsieur Paulette et ses épouses (Paris: Jean Fort, Collection des Orties Blanches, 1921).
- Fifi l’Arpète (Paris, Jean Fort, Collection des Orties Blanches, 1922).
- Paulette trahie (Paris, Jean Fort, Collection des Orties Blanches, 1922).
- Suzanne écuyère (Paris, Jean Fort, Collection des Orties Blanches, 1923).
- Lucile et Ginette, ou les vierges folles (Jean Fort, n.d. [1925]).
- La Pécheresse passionnée (Paris, Jean Fort, Collection des Orties Blanches, 1926).
- Brassée de faits (Paris, Jean Fort, Collection des Orties Blanches, 1926).
- Les Mains chéries (Paris, Jean Fort, Collection des Orties Blanches, 1927).
- Monsieur Paulette et ses épouses (Paris, Jean Fort, Collection des orties Blanches, 1930).

=== Other illustrations ===
- Le Prince de Zohim (Paris: Maison Quantin, 1893).
- Artistic postcard for the Collection des cent (1902).
- Hector France, Le Beau Nègre (Paris: Charles Carrington, 1902).
- Henri Lavedan, Le Marquis de Priola (Viveurs, Arthème Fayard, Modern-Bibliothèque, 1910).
- Pierre du Bourdel, Les Aventures amoureuses de Mlle de Sommerange (Paris: Jean Fort, 1910).
- Henri Lavedan, Les Marionnettes (Arthème Fayard, Modern-Bibliothèque, 1910).
- Henri Lavedan, Le Vieux Marcheur (Paris: Arthème Fayard, 1910).
- Sadie Blackeyes, Miss (Paris: Jean Fort, collection des Orties Blanches, 1912).
- Sadie Blackeyes, Lise fessée (Paris: Jean Fort, Collection des Orties Blanches, 1912).
- Honoré-Gabriel Riqueti de Mirabeau, Le Rideau levé ou L’Éducation de Laure (Paris: Jean Fort, 1912).
- Sadie Blackeyes, Quinze ans (Paris: Jean Fort, Collection des Orties Blanches, 1913).
- Victor Leca, La Cocotte de Paris (Paris: Jean Fort, 1913).
- John Cleland, Mémoires de Miss Fanny (Paris: Jean Fort, 1913).
- Victor Leca, La Cocotte de Paris (Paris: Jean Fort, 1913).
- René Schwaeblé, L’Amour à passions (Paris: Jean Fort, 1913).
- Sadie Blackeyes, Petite Dactylo, illustrated by Malteste (Paris: Jean Fort, 1914; reissue 1933).
- Pierre du Bourdel, Aventures amoureuses de Mlle de Sommerange (Paris, Jean Fort, 1914).
- Sadie Blackeyes, Baby, douce fille, illustrated by Malteste (Paris: Jean Fort, Collection des Orties Blanches, 1919).
- Claude Godard d’Aucour, Thémidore (Paris: Maurice Glomeau, 1926).
- Crébillon fils, Les Faits et gestes du vicomte de Nantel (Paris: Jean Fort, 1927).
- René-Michel Desergy, Édith préceptrice (Paris: Jean Fort, Collection des Orties Blanches, 1930).
- René-Michel Desergy, Diana gantée (Paris: Jean Fort, Collection des Orties Blanches, 1932).
- Liane Lauré, Confidences égarées (Paris: Jean Fort, Collection des Orties Blanches, 1932).
