= Rubber cement =

Type of adhesive

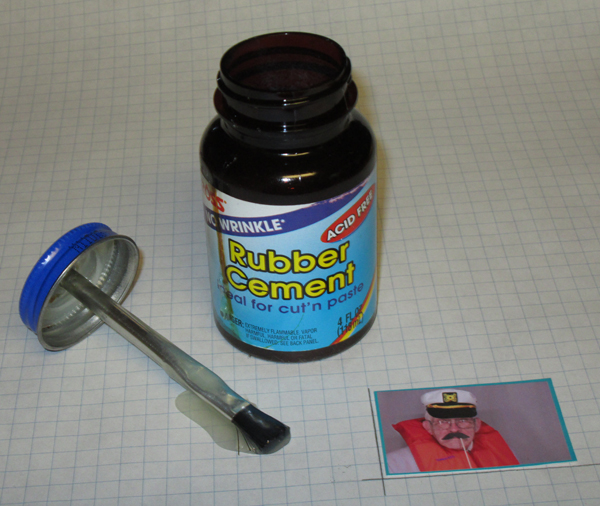
A bottle of rubber cement, showing a brush built into its cap and a photo about to be cemented to graph paper

Rubber cement (cow gum in British English) (also referred to as AP glue) is an adhesive made from elastic polymers (typically latex) mixed in a solvent such as acetone, hexane, heptane or toluene to keep it fluid enough to be used. This makes it part of the class of drying adhesives: as the solvents quickly evaporate, the rubber solidifies, forming a strong yet flexible bond.

== Composition ==
Rubber cement is simply a mixture of solid rubber in a volatile solvent that will dissolve it. When the cement is applied, the solvent evaporates, leaving the rubber as the adhesive. Almost any rubber (pre-vulcanized or not) can be used. The rubbers used might be natural rubber, gum mastic or gum arabic. Early solvents used included chloroform and benzene. A small percentage of alcohol is often added to the mix.

In the United States, current formulations include n-heptane. In the United Kingdom, a product called Marabu-Fixogum uses acetone, while a product called Copydex uses ammonia.

Many special compositions include hardeners and/or vulcanizing agents designed to improve the cohesion of the rubber. Water-based formulae, often stabilised by ammonia, are also available.

== Usage ==
Rubber cement is favoured in handicrafts applications, where easy and damage-free removal of adhesive is desired. For example, rubber cement is used as the marking fluid in erasable pens.

Because rubber cements are designed to peel easily or rub off without damaging the paper or leaving any trace of adhesive behind, they are ideal for use in paste-up work where excess cement might need to be removed. It also does not become brittle like paste does. Older formula rubber cements are not considered an archivally sound adhesive because of their low pH value (making them acidic) and will cause deterioration of photographs and paper over time. Modern rubber cements are acid-free, making them ideal for archival purposes.

Rubber cement thinners are also available, and are used to replace the solvent that evaporates from the container or to remove residual adhesive.

== Hazards ==
The solvents used in rubber cement present some hazards, including flammability and potential for abuse as inhalants. Therefore, as with any adhesive containing solvents, rubber cement should be used in an open area. Also, care needs be taken to avoid heat sources, as n-heptane and n-hexane are highly flammable. Rubber cement and rubber cement thinners that contain acetone will damage polished surfaces and many plastics.
