= Copydex =

Latex-based rubber cement used as an adhesive

Copydex is a common latex-based rubber cement in the UK. It can be recognised by its characteristic "fishy" odour. Since 1986, it has been owned by Henkel.

This contact adhesive is used when sticking a variety of materials, such as paper, board, upholstery, and carpet. Copydex is used by model makers as a "mask" to protect areas during airbrushing. It is used to apply false eyelashes in the theatre.

== Composition ==
Unlike many other rubber cements, it consists of latex dissolved in water. As such it is relatively non-toxic and so is frequently used in primary schools. It also contains ammonia to stabilise the rubber solution. This is the source of its characteristic smell.
