= Plantas alimentícias não convencionais =

Movement to increase consumption of unconventional edible plants

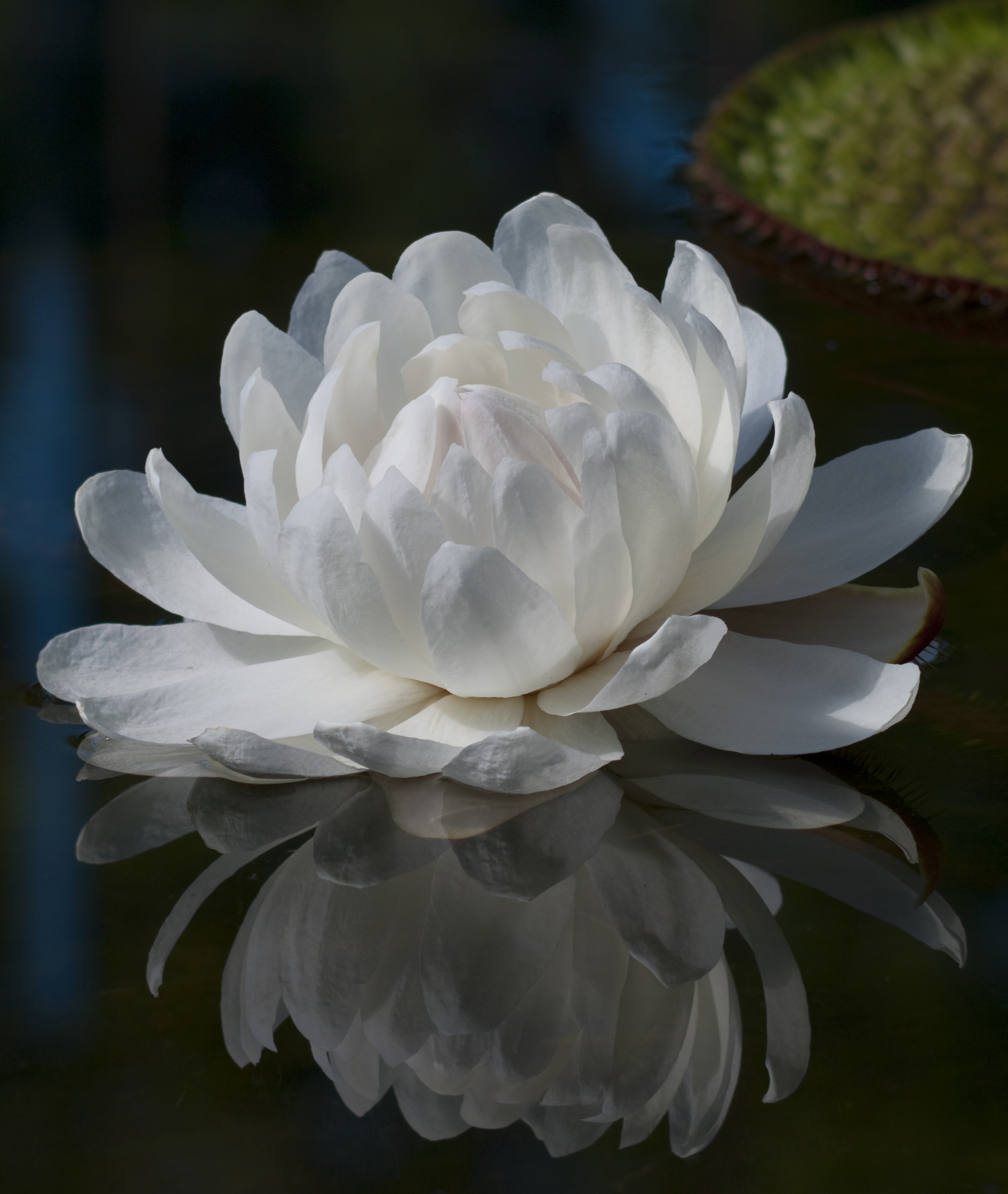
Victoria amazonica, an example of a PANC

Plantas alimentícias não convencionais (PANC) (lit. 'non-conventional food plants'), is an academic and popular education agroforestry botany movement, specially in Brazil and Latin America, of open research and social marketing for uncommon edible plants, mainly those that self-breed without harvesting efforts in empty lots and roads that have nutritional properties.

Due to the advances in modern agriculture and changes in cuisine, several plants that were historically cultivated are no longer utilized, and may be pejoratively referred to as weeds.

These, usually native species, are often resistant to pests, need little wild gardening care, and can be grown in unconventional places, such as small closed spaces, roadsides, or vacant lots with very few resources.

== History ==
In 2007 the term was coined by Valdely Kinupp, in his Ph.D. thesis in botanics by the Federal University of Rio Grande do Sul, which later became a seminal work in the field. Since PANCs are site specific, so varying from region to region, he created the Isto é PANC? group to help identify edible plants.

In 2010, the Brazilian Ministry of Agriculture released the Manual de hortaliças não convencionais (Manual of non-conventional vegetables). This book compiled 23 vegetable species with edible parts, and assists in the use and partial identification of PANCs.

In 2017, the Food and Agriculture Organization has accepted it as an open standard for family agriculture and is available in several sources online for download as an open educational resources.

== Examples ==
- Basella alba can be eaten sautéed, cooked or raw.
- Maranta arundinacea has rhizomatous stems from which a starch can be extracted.
- Ora Pro Nobis (Pereskia aculeata).
- Tropaeolum majus is entirely edible above ground, including the seeds.
