= Lucien Guitry =

French actor (1860–1925)

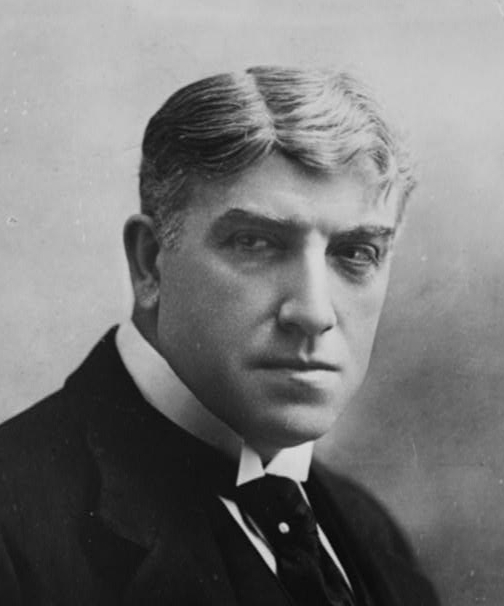
- Born: Lucien Germain Guitry; 13 December 1860; Paris, France
- Died: 1 June 1925 (aged 64); Paris, France
- Occupation: Actor

Lucien Germain Guitry (French pronunciation: [lysjɛ̃ ʒɛʁmɛ̃ ɡitʁi]; 13 December 1860 – 1 June 1925) was a French actor.

== Life ==
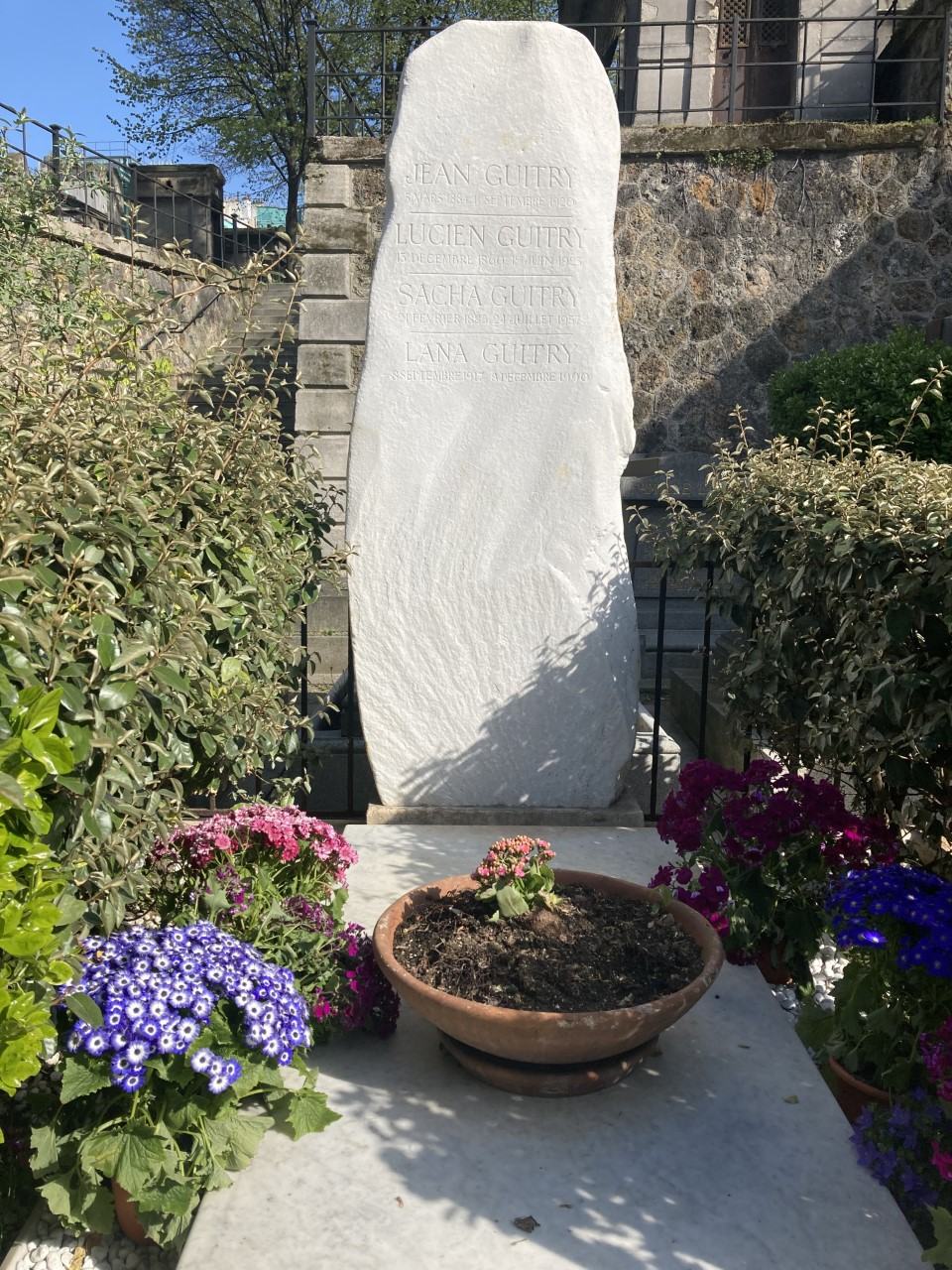
Grave.

In 1885, while living in Saint Petersburg, Guitry appeared at the French (or Mikhaylovsky) Theatre. His son, the future actor, writer and director Sacha Guitry, was born in Saint Petersburg and named in honour of Tsar Alexander III. Lucien met the composer Pyotr Ilyich Tchaikovsky and his brother Modest, and became good friends with them. It was at Guitry's instigation that Tchaikovsky wrote both his Hamlet Overture-Fantasy (Op. 67a) in 1888, and the Incidental Music to the Shakespeare play (Op. 67b) in 1891, for which he reused the overture-fantasy in shortened form as the overture.

He became prominent on the French stage at the Renaissance theatre (Les Mauvais bergers, by Octave Mirbeau), in 1897, then at Porte Saint-Martin theatre in 1900, and the Variétés in 1901. He was a member of the Comédie-Française, but resigned in order to become director of the Renaissance, where he was principally associated with the actress Marthe Brandès, who had also left the Comédie. Here, in a number of plays, he established his reputation as one of the greatest contemporary French actors in the drama of modern reality.

In 1920 he went to London, with his son Sacha, and was a success in a play titled Pasteur, himself playing the eponymous scientist, and in his son's play Mon Père avait Raison.

== Filmography ==
- Ceux de chez nous (1915)
