= Edible underwear =

Candy item

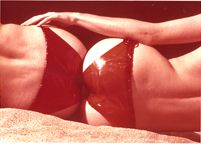
Original Candypants Edible Underwear

Edible underwear is a candy item which is made into the form of, and can function as, underwear, but which is edible.

The product was invented by David Sanderson and Lee Brady in 1975 when they formed a company Cosmorotics, Inc. to manufacture and market the product under the name "Candypants, the original 100% edible underwear". At first the U.S. Patent and Trademark Office denied their application for a patent on the basis that the idea of candy and "pants" were incompatible, but later granted the application and within weeks hundreds of thousands of pairs were manufactured and distributed out of the company's food manufacturing plant in Chicago, Illinois.

"Candypants" was promoted as lingerie in clothing shops, major department stores, motorcycle shops, candy stores and chic emporiums. The press found it an outrageous delight and news coverage pushed edible underwear into the national and worldwide limelight. The product continues also to be sold through sex shops.

Candypants featured in two separate U.S. Supreme Court battles for First Amendment rights. Edible underwear, as "Candypants", was used by the defense for Screw magazine in their fight to stay on the news stands despite their content and then again by the prosecution to attempt to shut down the late night public-access television cable TV show Midnight Blue in New York City. At the same time author Jerzy Kosinski in his novel Pinball referred to it as "the essence of American freedom" on the Late Night with David Letterman show.

In 1989, edible underwear was listed by People magazine as being one of the 434 names and events that define pop culture.
