= List of torture methods =

A list of torture methods and devices includes:

== Psychological torture methods ==
- Chinese water torture
- Humiliation
- Subjection to periods of interrogation
- Music torture
- Mock execution
- Forced nudity
- Seclusion
- Pharmacological torture
- Exploitation of phobias; e.g., mock execution, leaving arachnophobes in a room full of spiders
- Sensory deprivation
- Sensory overload
- Sleep deprivation
- Solitary confinement / isolation
- Threat of severe disfigurement
- Tickle torture
- Waterboarding
- White room torture

== Physical torture methods ==
- Acid attack
- Bamboo torture (Use disputed)
- Bastinado
- Birching
- Blinding with light
- Blood eagle (Use disputed)
- Boiling
- Brazen Bull
- Bone breaking
- Branding
- Burning
- Burying alive
- Castration
- Cement shoes
- Chinese water torture
- Cigarette burns
- Cock and ball torture
- Coffin torture/Gibbeting
- Combing
- Crucifixion
- Crushing
- Curb stomping
- Cutting
- Dehydration
- Denailing
- Disembowelment
- Disfigurement
- Dismemberment
- Drowning
- Dry-boarding
- Dunking
- Emasculation
- Enemas
- Eye-gouging
- Finger/hand removal
- Flagellation
- Flaying
- Foot roasting
- Force-feeding
- Forced circumcision
- Goat's tongue
- Half-hanging
- Hamstringing
- Hanging, drawing, and quartering
- Helicopter position
- Immurement
- Jetliner position
- Keelhauling
- Kicking
- Kneecapping
- Mutilation
- Necklacing
- Noise (see Sound entry)
- Oxygen deprivation
- Palestinian chair
- Parrilla (torture)
- Pitchcapping
- Poena cullei
- Pressure points
- Punching
- Restraint
- Rape
- Rat torture
- Riding a rail
- Sawing
- Scalping
- Scaphism
- Schwedentrunk
- Sensory overload
- Sexual assault
- Shabeh
- Shooting
- Sleep deprivation
- Slow slicing
- Smacking/slapping
- Sound (extremely high volumes, dynamic range, low frequency, high pitched noise, intended to interfere with rest, cognition and concentration)
- Stabbing
- Starvation
- Stoning
- Strangling
- Strappado
- Stress positions
- Syrian box torture
- Tarring and feathering
- Tickle torture
- Tiger bench
- Toe/foot removal
- Tooth extraction
- Waist chop
- Walling
- Water cure
- Waterboarding
- Welcome parade (torture)

== Instruments of torture ==
Note that the line between "torture method" and "torture device" is often blurred, particularly when a specifically named implement is but one component of a method. Also, many devices that can be used for torture have mainstream uses, completely unrelated to torture.

- Ana-tsurushi
- Batog
- Birch rod
- Boats
- Branding iron
- Brazen bull
- Breaking wheel
- Breast ripper
- Cangue
- Castor oil
- Catapelta
- Choke pear / Pear of anguish
- Coffin
- Crucifix
- Ducking stool
- Electroshock weapon
  - Cattle prod
  - Graduated electronic decelerator
- Enema
- Gag
- Garrote
- Genital Mutilation
- Hand crusher
- Head crusher
- Heretic's fork (use disputed)
- Instep borer
- Iron Apega
- Iron chair
- Iron maiden (use disputed)
- Iron Pig Mask
- Iron Spider
- Jiagun
- Jougs
- Judas cradle
- Keel
- Knee Splitter
- Lead Sprinkler
- Mancuerda
- Parrilla
- Pau de Arara
- Pendulum (of disputed historicity)
- Picana
- Padded cell
- Pillory
  - Drunkard's cloak
  - Shrew's fiddle
  - Tablilla
- Quemadero
- Rack
- Rhaphanidosis
- Rope
- Scavenger's daughter
- Schandmantel
- Schwedentrunk
- Scold's bridle
- Spanish boot
- Stocks
- Strappado
- Thumbscrew
- Tongue tearer
- Tramp chair
- Tucker telephone
- Whip
- Whirligig
- Wicker man (use disputed)
- Wooden horse
- Zanzhi

== Medieval and early modern instruments of torture ==
=== Chair of torture ===
==== Appearance ====
There are many variants of the chair, though they all have one thing in common: spikes cover the back, arm-rests, seat, leg-rests, and foot-rests. The number of spikes in one of these chairs ranges from 500 to 1,500.

==== Use ====
To avoid movement, the victim's wrists were tied to the chair or, in one version, two bars pushed the arms against arm-rests for the spikes to penetrate the flesh even further. In some versions, there were holes under the chair's bottom where the torturer placed coal to cause severe burns while the victim still remained conscious. In other versions, there were weights that would be placed on the victim's thighs or feet. In a special version, there were spikes on the headrest, and the executioner pushed the victim's head against it.

This instrument's strength lies primarily in the psychological fear caused to the victims. They would often use the victim's fear to coerce them into confessing by forcing the victim to watch someone else be tortured with this instrument.

The time of death greatly varied ranging from a few hours to a day or more. No spikes penetrated any vital organ, and the wounds were closed by the spikes themselves which delayed blood loss greatly.

=== The rack ===
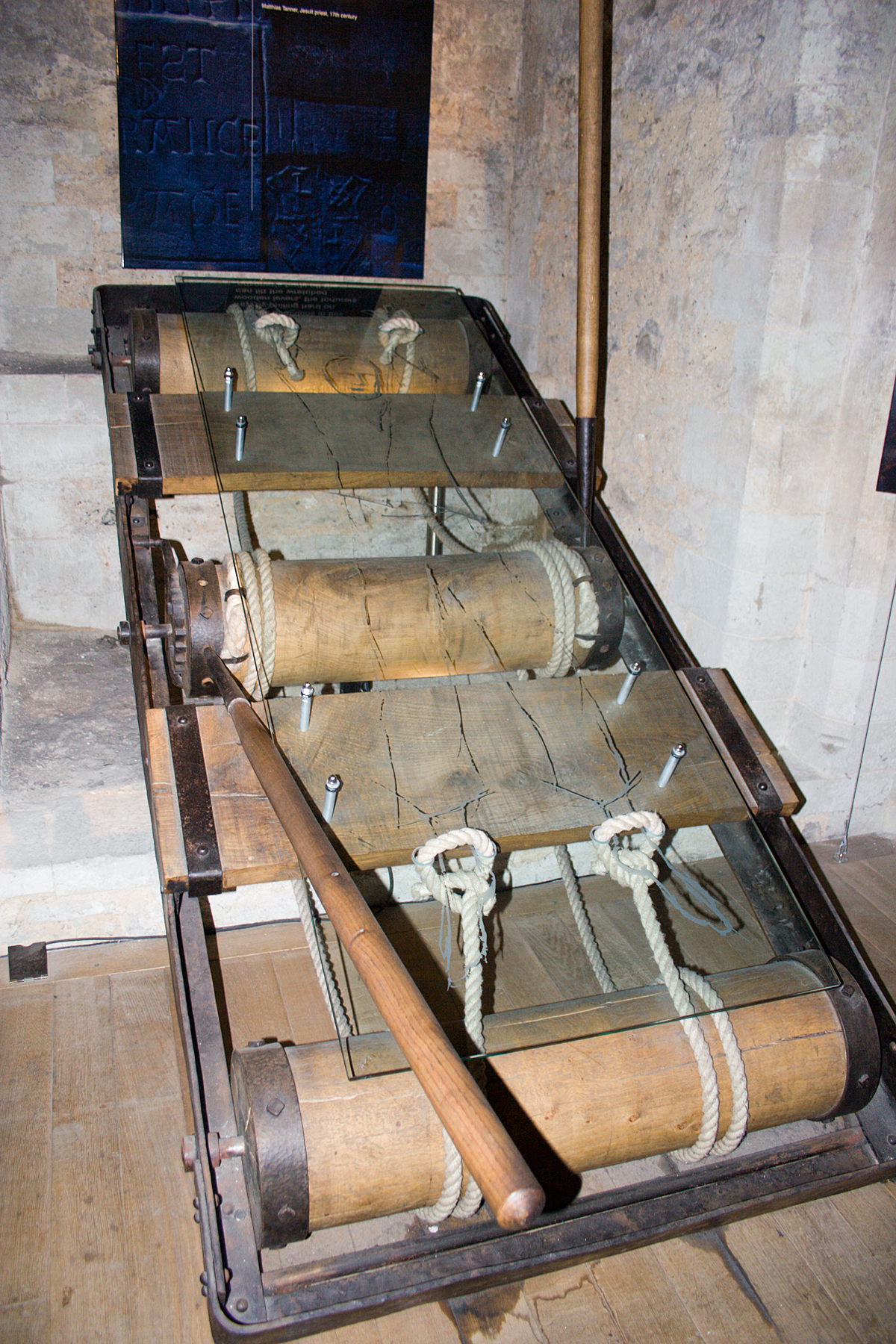
A torture rack in the Tower of London

==== Origins ====
The rack was first used in antiquity and it is unclear exactly from which civilization it originated, though some of the earliest examples are from Greece.
Arrian's Anabasis of Alexander states that Alexander the Great had the pages who conspired in his assassination, and their mentor, his court historian Callisthenes, tortured on the rack in 328 BC.

==== Appearance ====
The rack is a torture device that consists of an oblong, rectangular, usually wooden frame, slightly raised from the ground, with a roller at one, or both, ends, having at one end a fixed bar to which the legs were fastened, and at the other a movable bar to which the hands were tied. The victim's feet are fastened to one roller, and the wrists are chained to the other.

==== Use ====
The torturer turned the handle, causing the ropes to pull the victim's arms. Eventually, the victim's bones were dislocated with a loud crack, caused by snapping cartilage, ligaments or bones. If the torturer kept turning the handles, the limbs would eventually be torn off.

This method was mostly used to extract confessions. Not confessing meant that the torturer could stretch more. Sometimes, torturers forced their victim to watch other people be tortured with this device to implant psychological fear.

Many knights from the Knights Templar were tortured with the rack. The limbs collected from this and other punishments of the time were "emptied by the hundreds".

Sometimes, this method was limited to dislocating a few bones, but the torturer often went too far and rendered the legs or arms (sometimes both) useless. In the late Middle Ages, some new variants of this instrument appeared. They often had spikes that penetrated the victim's back - as the limbs were pulled apart, so was his or her spinal cord, increasing not only in physical pain but the psychological one of being handicapped at best, too.

=== Brazen bull ===
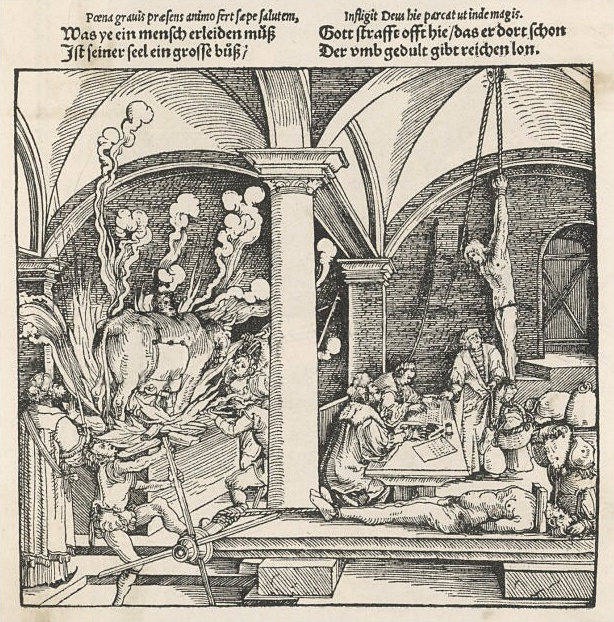
A brazen bull as depicted by Hans Burgkmair the Elder.

==== Origins ====
The Brazen Bull was invented in Ancient Greece, by Perillos of Athens as a hollow bull-shaped statue in which victims were roasted alive over a fire. Perillos proposed his idea of a more painful means of execution to Phalaris, the tyrant of Akraga. Phalaris liked the idea of the Brazen Bull, and so it was made. Once finished, Phalaris ordered it to be tested on Perillos himself. Perillos was removed from the Bull before he died, but was later killed by Phalaris when he threw Perillos off a hill. The Greeks had specially engineered tubes to make the screams of the victims sound like the noise of a bull.

==== Appearance ====
The Bull was made wholly of brass, and was hollow with a door in the side.

==== Use ====
When a victim was placed inside the brazen bull, they were slowly burned to death. The device gradually became more sophisticated, until the Greeks invented a complex system of tubes in order to make the victim's screams sound more like an infuriated bull, and also made it so the smoke from it rose in clouds of incense. This torture is similar to being boiled alive.

Even though this torture was not used during the Middle Ages as it was used earlier by the Greek and Romans, a simple form of boiling was still used in Central Europe, without the use of the bull.

=== Pear of anguish ===
==== Appearance ====
A pear shaped instrument, consisting of four leaves that slowly separated from each other as the torturer turned the screw at the top.

==== Use ====
There is no contemporary first-hand account of those devices or their use. An early mention of a spring-loaded gagging device is in F. de Calvi's L'Inventaire général de l'histoire des larrons ("General inventory of the history of thieves"), written in 1639, which attributes the invention to a robber named Capitaine Gaucherou de Palioly in the days of Henry of Navarre.

Further mentions of the device appear in the 19th century. They are also mentioned in Grose's Dictionary of the Vulgar Tongue (1811) as "Choak Pears," and described as being "formerly used in Holland."

They were also discussed in a book by Eldridge and Watts, superintendent of police and chief inspector of the detective bureau in Boston, Massachusetts (1897). While accepting that ordinary pear-shaped gags exist, they observed that contemporary robbers used no such device as Palioly's Pear and cast doubt upon its very existence in the first place, saying that "fortunately for us this 'diabolical invention' appears to be one of the lost arts, if, indeed, it ever existed outside of de Calvi's head. There is no doubt, however, of the fashioning of a pear-shaped gag which has been largely used in former days by robbers in Europe, and may still be employed to some extent. This is also known as the 'choke-pear', though it is far less marvellous and dangerous than the pear of Palioly."

Though there is little or no evidence of its being used by bandits, there are a number of examples of ornate and elaborate, pear-shaped devices with three or four leaves or lobes, driven by turning a key that rotates the central screw thread, which spreads the leaves. These are generally held in museums devoted to the subject of torture, and are described as instruments of torture by distension or evisceration. Some, but not all, have small spikes of uncertain purpose at the bottom of each leaf. However, these devices do not seem to match the descriptions given by Calvi or the 19th century sources.

=== Dunking ===
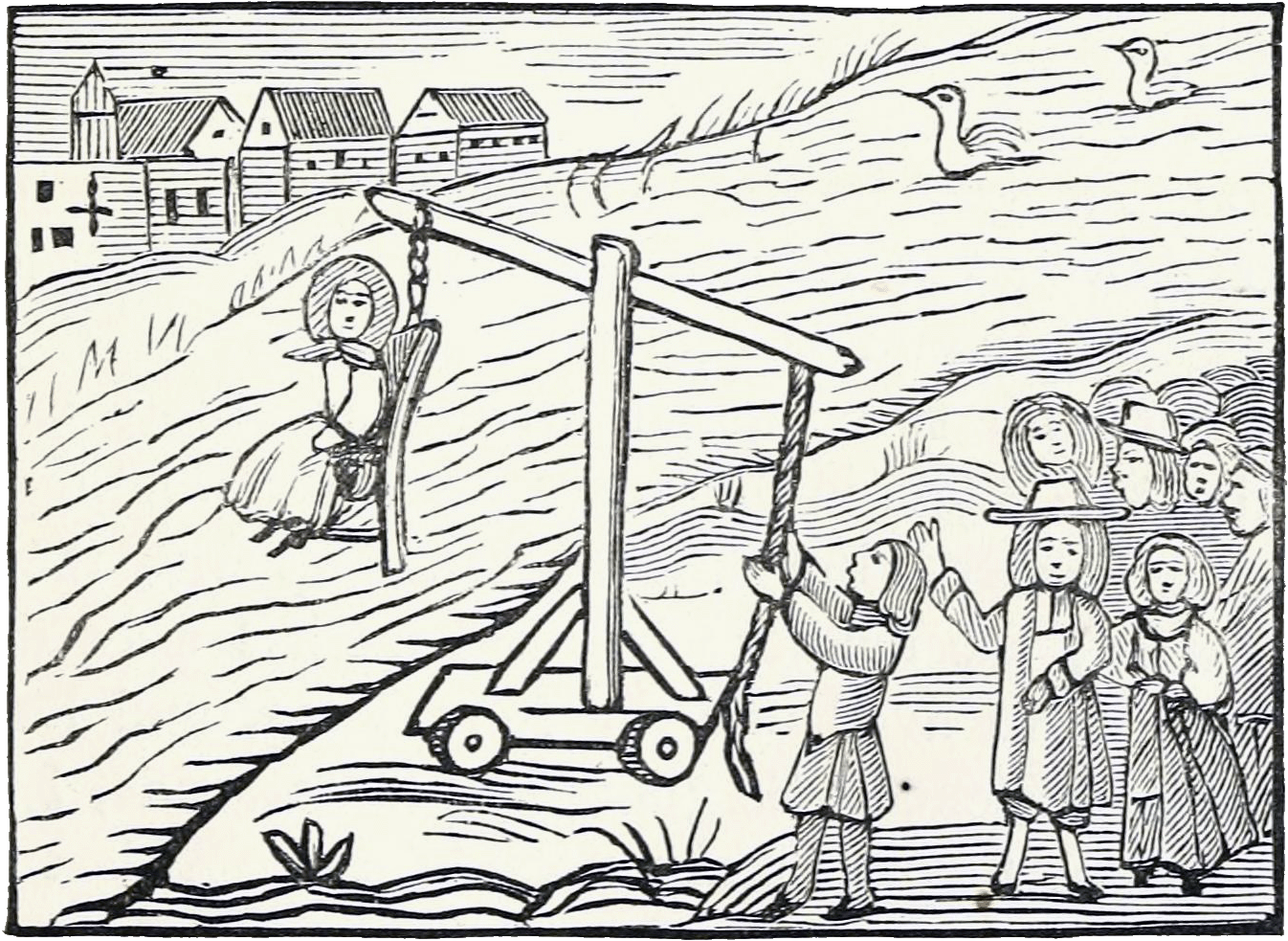
Punishing a common scold in the dunking stool.

==== Use ====
This was a form of punishment that was mainly reserved for supposed witches. The victim was tied to a chair which was elevated by ropes above a pond or barrel/vat of water. The victim was then lowered into the water until completely underwater/submerged. The chair was raised if the victim was about to pass out or to give the victim a chance to confess. Often, some form of a plug, or more simply, a piece of fruit, was placed in the victim's mouth and nose beforehand, so they couldn't get a good breath before being dunked. If the victim confessed they would most likely be killed. This method was widely used during the Spanish Inquisition and in England and France. The victim was usually intermittently submerged for many hours until he or she revealed information or death had occurred. Ordeal by water began with the witch-hunts of the 16th and 17th centuries. King James VI of Scotland (later also James I of England) claimed in his Daemonologie that water was so pure an element that it repelled the guilty.

While supposed witches were commonly tortured using this method, thieves and murderers could be subjected to it in order to extract a confession. This was more common when other more sophisticated torture devices were not present.

Dunking was also used as punishment for common scolds.

=== Boiling ===
==== Use ====
In England, statute 22 passed in 1532 by Henry VIII, made boiling a legal form of capital punishment. It began to be used for murderers who used poisons after the Bishop of Rochester's cook, Richard Rice, gave a number of people poisoned porridge, resulting in two deaths in February 1532. Boiling to death was employed again in 1542 for a woman who also used poison. It was also used for counterfeiters, swindlers and coin forgers during the Middle Ages.

A large cauldron was filled with water, oil, tar, tallow or molten lead. The liquid was then boiled. Sometimes the victim would be placed in the cauldron before it was boiled so as to be cooked slowly. Or they would be placed, usually head first, into the already boiling liquid.

This was more frequently a way to execute a prisoner rather than to extract a confession.

=== Exposure ===
==== Types ====
===== Freezing to death =====
In the winter, the naked victim was forced to stand outside in full view of everyone. Slowly, the torturer poured water on the victim's head which eventually became frozen, making them die slowly and painfully. Sometimes the body was left for the whole winter to terrify the population and dissuade any further crimes.

===== Live burial =====
As its name implies, this method consists of exposing a victim to the elements. The victim could be buried up to their neck letting any animals, insects or other people kill them slowly.

===== Restraint =====
The gibbet, a large iron basket with holes large enough for arms and legs, would be hung from a pole with a person inside it. During hot days, the metal would heat, causing pain. During cold days and nights, the chill, as well as lack of protection from the wind, could easily sap a victim's body heat. The holes in the grating were also big enough to allow carrion birds, and the occasional rat, to enter and pluck at a victim's skin and eyes.

=== Rat torture ===
A cheap and effective way to torture someone was with the use of rats. One of the first documented utilizations of the method was by Diederik Sonoy. There were many variants, but the most common was to force a rat to gnaw through a victim's body (usually the intestines) in order to escape, as follows: The victim would be completely restrained and tied to the ground or a bed, and the torturer would cut slits into the victim's stomach. The torturer would then use a bowl to trap rats on the victim's stomach, then place hot coal on top of the bowl; the rats would then get hot, and after a few seconds would enter the victim's stomach. Gnawing the intestines usually resulted in a few hours of pain for the victim. This almost always resulted in death.

== See also ==
- List of methods of capital punishment (torture devices)
- Peine forte et dure
- Torture chamber
- Torture Museums
  - Rüdesheim am Rhein § Museums (Mediaeval Torture Museum)
- Turcas
