= Surviving History =

2008 American TV series

- Starring: David Fachman
- Country of origin: United States
- Original language: English
- No. of seasons: 1
- No. of episodes: 9

Production
- Executive producers: Travis Gray, Nicholas Panagopulos
- Production location: Columbus, Ohio
- Running time: 44 minutes (without commercials)

Original release
- Network: History Channel
- Release: June 15 – July 20, 2008

Surviving History is a series that aired on the History Channel. In the show, ancient weapons, devices, and execution methods are recreated and tested.

== Description ==
On Surviving History, the founder and employees of the ScareFactory attempt to recreate ancient devices. The main team consists of Dave Fachman (Boss), Eric Conrath (Art Director), Josh Craig (Floor Manager), Brian Shoaf (Historian), Chad Reynolds (Fabricator), and DJ Weatherby (Welder/Designer). The show also features three history professors who are experts on ancient technologies, Dr. Keith Pepperell (6 episodes) Dr. Meg Mateer (2 episodes) and Dr. Tim Davis (1 episode). The devices created are not always built of period materials or methods, but are functional. Dangerous devices are tested with purpose-build dummies. Many are also tested on ScareFactory employees, with appropriate protection and emergency services.

== Broadcast history ==
Surviving History aired on Sunday nights in June, then moved to Thursday nights. 4 episodes aired in a marathon during the afternoon of July 12, 2008. The final episode aired in the early morning of July 20, 2008.

The series began airing on History International at 8PM ET on Tuesdays, beginning September 2, 2008.

Individual episodes are available through VOD services, iTunes, and DVDs in the History Channel store.

All 9 episodes were released on DVD on November 18, 2008.

== Episode list ==
This table lists the episodes in the order they were aired. The episode numbers on iTunes and similar may be different.

The official web page on the History web site was never updated after the first few episodes and only has descriptions of the first three, with the wrong air date for the 3rd.

No.	Title	Original release date	Prod. code
1	TBA	TBA	June 15, 2008
Halifax Gibbet, Chinese water torture, Iron Boot, Iron Maiden, Chinese Fire Arrow
2	TBA	TBA	June 22, 2008
Liar's rack, Branks, Atlatl, Brazen bull, Pillory
3	TBA	TBA	June 29, 2008
Breaking wheel, Firewalking, Bastinado, Treadwheel, Tar and Feathers
4	TBA	TBA	TBA
Pressed to Death, Cat o' nine tails, Pretzel, Scorpio, Heron's vending machine
5	TBA	TBA	July 12, 2008
Judas Cradle, Pear of Anguish, Heretic's fork, The Pit and the Pendulum, Ball and chain
6	TBA	TBA	July 12, 2008
Garrote, Isolation Chamber, Rope torture, Gallows, Firing squad
7	TBA	TBA	July 12, 2008
Strappado, Shame flute, Chinese repeating crossbow, Joust, Chastity belt
8	TBA	TBA	July 12, 2008
Battering ram, Baghdad Battery, Morning Star, Whirligig, Hero's Steam Engine
9	TBA	TBA	July 20, 2008
Archimedes' Death ray, Barrel Roll, Ducking stool, Rack, Scavenger's daughter
