= Riding the rail =

Riding the rail may refer to:

- Riding a rail, assaultive punishment by a mob
- Riding the rails, freighthopping
- Standing in the front row at a music event, up against guardrails separating the crowd from the stage.

== See also ==
- Riding the rods, and "riding a rod", former forms of freighthopping, by riding undercarriage of railroad car
