= Robert Titus =

Robert Titus may refer to:

- Robert Titus (colonist) (c. 1600–1672), first Titus immigrant from England to America
- Robert F. Titus (1926–2024), United States Air Force general and fighter pilot
- Robert C. Titus (1839–1918), American lawyer and politician from New York
- Bob Titus, member of the Missouri House of Representatives
