= Schandmantel =

Torture device

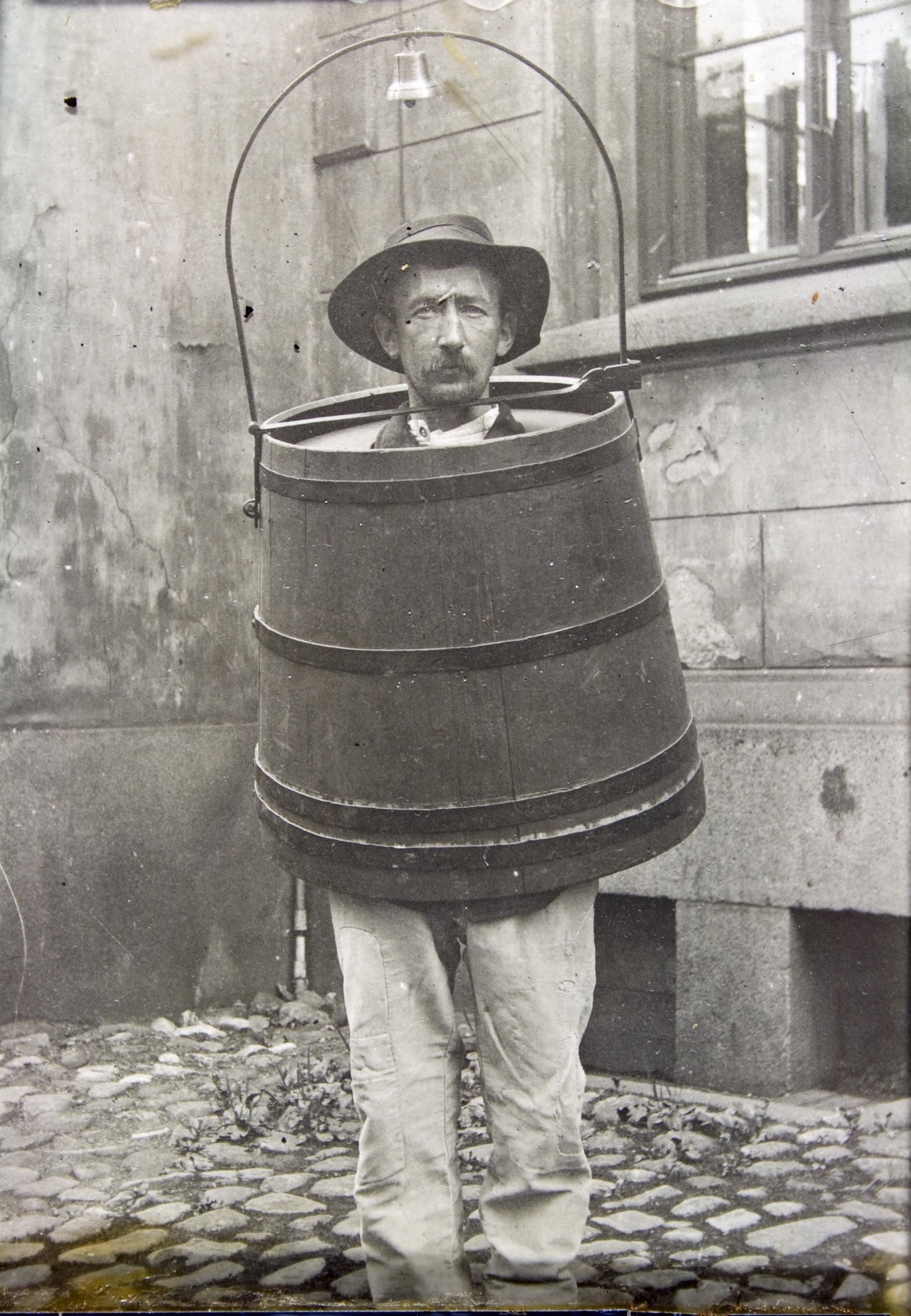
A man wearing a schandmantel

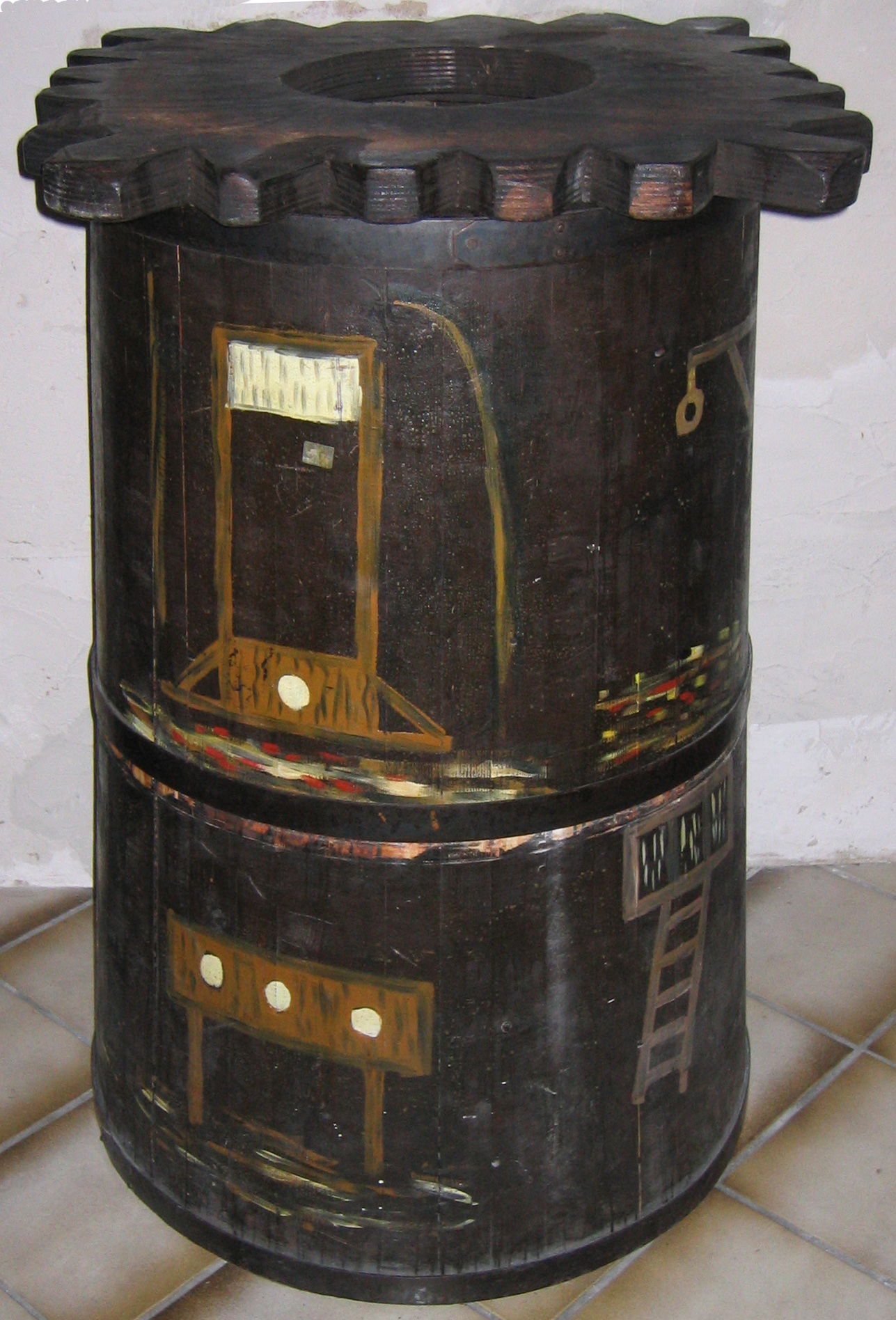
Schandmantel

A Schandmantel or Schandtonne (German, "coat of shame" or "barrel of shame"), sometimes also Spanish coat, is a torture device which came into use in the 13th century. Schandmantels were fashioned from wood and sometimes lined with sheet metal. Victims were made to wear this device in public where they would be insulted, humiliated and have rotten vegetables thrown at them. The Schandmantel was mostly used as punishment for poachers and prostitutes or other petty crimes. It was an alternative to throwing someone into the stockade or prison.

The use of the Schandmantel was comparable to the Lästersteine (German) or schandstenen (Dutch), heavy stones weighing down from the neck. The Schandmantel was weighted along the lower rim and around the neck opening as a way of corporal punishment in addition to the severe public humiliation it posed.

The 19th-century development of the iron maiden may have been a misinterpretation of the function of the Schandmantel.

== See also ==
- Bankruptcy barrel
- Drunkard's cloak
