= Whirligig (disambiguation) =

A whirligig is an object that spins or whirls, or has whirling parts, also found at:

- Buzzer (whirligig)

Whirligig may also refer to:

- Whirligig (torture), a medieval torture device
- Whirl-Y-Gig, a dance club in London
- Whirligig beetle, a family of water beetles
- Whirlygig, a film by Chaz Thorne
- Samara (fruit) or whirligig, a tree fruit with a papery winglike appendage
- Whirligig (novel), a young-adult novel by Paul Fleischman
- Whirligigs, book of stories by O. Henry (1910), including the short story "The Whirligig of Life"
- Whirligig (TV series), BBC television programme for children broadcast 1950–56
- Rotary clothes lines are commonly referred to as whirligigs in Britain

== Music ==
- Whirligig (album), a 1995 album by the rock band The Caulfields
- Whirlygig (album), a 1997 album by the rock band Lovemongers
- Whirligig, a piano piece by Arnold Bax
