= Spanish mantle =

Spanish mantle may refer to:

- Mantilla, a traditional Spanish shawl worn over the head and shoulders, often over a high comb
- Drunkard's cloak, a type of pillory
