= Telemachus (Acragas) =

6th-century BC Sicilian leader

Telemachus was the mythical leader of a 554 BC general uprising in the Greek city-state of Acragas, Sicily, Magna Graecia, which culminated in the overthrow of the cruel tyrant Phalaris. Some versions of the legend state that Phalaris was roasted to death in his own brazen bull.

Telemachus was the ancestor of Aenesidamus and of Aenesidamus's son Theron (tyrant c. 488–472 BC).
