= John Collins (cartoonist) =

John Alton Collins (7 October 1917 – 16 September 2007) was born in Washington D.C., and moved with his family to Canada in 1920. He studied art at Sir George Williams University and the Montreal School of Fine Arts. In 1939, he became the first staff cartoonist for the Montreal Gazette, where he worked until his retirement in 1982. Many of Collins's cartoons included the character Uno Who, a cash-strapped taxpayer who wore only a bankruptcy barrel. He was considered a gentleman among editorial cartoonists, with a reputation of speed and reliability. John Collins died aged 89 on September 17, 2007.

== Honours and awards ==
Collins won the National Newspaper Award in 1954 and 1973. In 1969, he served as head of the Association of American Editorial Cartoonists.

== Archives ==
There is a John Collins fonds at Library and Archives Canada. The archival reference number is R5862. The fonds consists of 3,333 original political cartoons by Collins, published in the Montreal Gazette from 1960 to 1982. The fonds also contains an original cartoon by J.B. Fitzmaurice, published in the Montreal Herald in 1913.
