= Warning out of town =

Extrajudicial punishment in the United States

Warning out of town was a widespread method in the United States for established New England communities to pressure or coerce "outsiders" to settle elsewhere. It consisted of a notice ordered by the Board of Selectmen of a town, and served by the constable upon any newcomer who might become a town charge. When persons were warned out of a town, they were not necessarily forcibly removed.

The first warning out in Plymouth Colony was recorded on June 6, 1654, in the village of Rehoboth. Robert Titus was called into town court and told to take his family out of Plymouth Colony for allowing "persons of evil fame" to live in his home. The practice was common throughout the early Colonial Period, and died out in the early 19th century. In Vermont, for example, the law was changed to disallow "warning out" in 1817.

== Legal foundation ==
The right of a municipality to "warn out" one of its inhabitants was based on the theory that a city has a common law duty to care for its inhabitants when they cannot support themselves; therefore, it was reasoned, the city had the right to "exclude from inhabitancy persons for whose conduct or support they did not desire to be responsible." According to another theory, the right to exclude inhabitants was derived from the principle that "the estate of any inhabitant of a town is liable to be taken in execution on a judgment against the town".

The practice of warning out replaced an earlier practice in which admission to a town as an inhabitant, or purchase of property within a town, required a vote of the present inhabitants or the Board of Selectmen. As cities grew, and it became difficult to enforce the requirement of approval prior to residency, municipalities began to make a distinction between residency and inhabitancy: those residents who were not admitted to inhabitancy could be "warned out", and thereby the town would be spared liability for the resident in case of poverty. Sometimes, there was a time limit by which, if a resident had not been warned, they would automatically become an inhabitant.

== See also ==
- Charivari in North America
- Extrajudicial punishment
- Lynching
- Mobbing
- Riding the rail
- Tarring and feathering
- Vigilante

== Works cited ==
- Benton, Josiah Henry (1911), Warning Out in New England, Boston: W.B. Clarke.
- Tilton, George (1918), History of Rehoboth, Boston.
- Titus, Leo Jr. (2004), Titus, A North American Family History, Baltimore.
