= Georgette de Montenay =

French author (1540–1581)

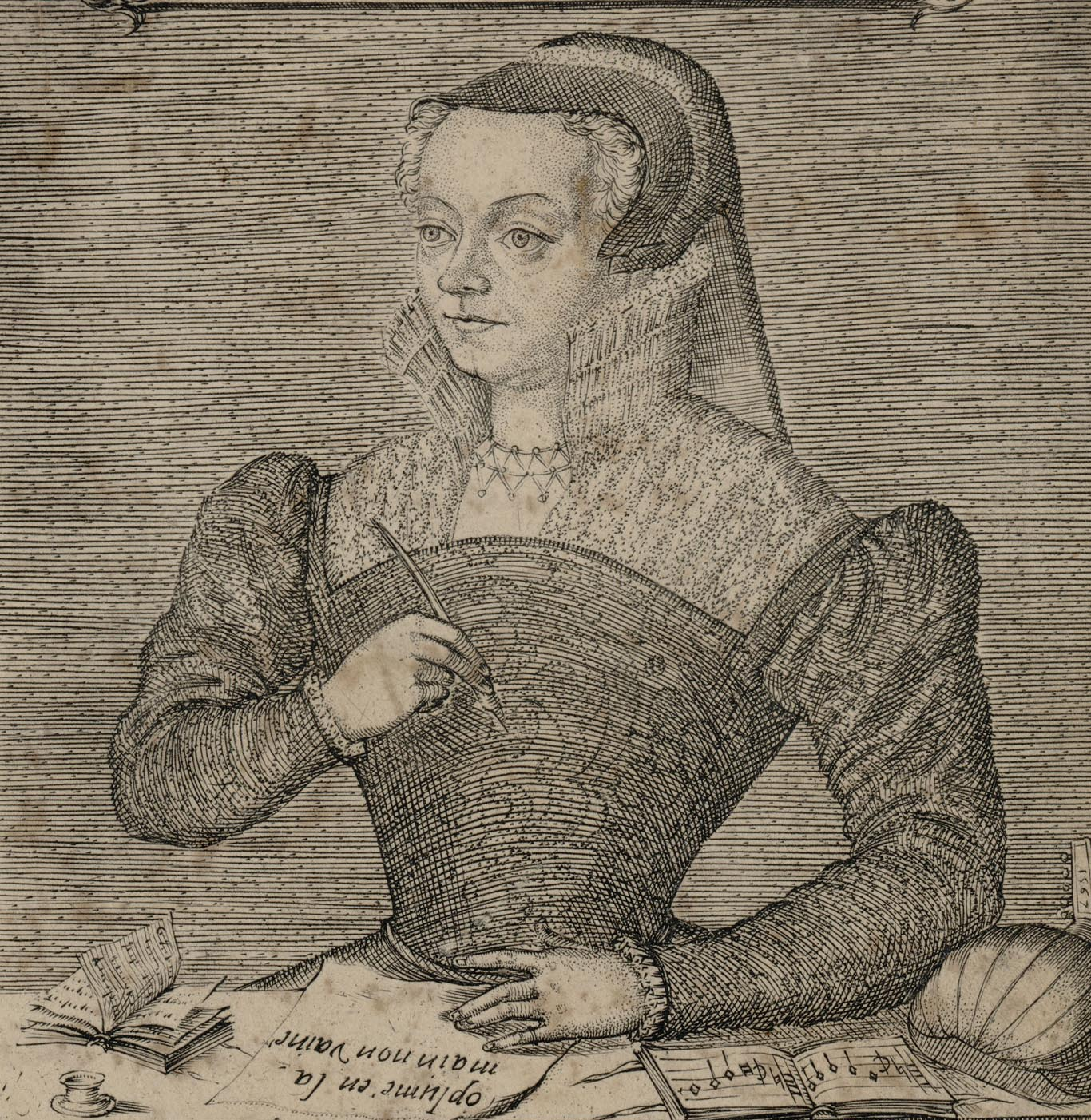
Georgette de Montenay (1567) by Pierre Woeiriot

Georgette de Montenay (1540–1581) was the French author of Emblemes ou devises chrestiennes, published in Lyon between 1567 and 1571. Montenay has always been regarded as a lady-in-waiting to Jeanne d'Albret, the Protestant Queen of Navarre, partly because she dedicated her work to the Queen. An intriguing aspect of Montenay's Calvinist life is that she was married in 1562 to Guyon de Gout, a devout Catholic.

Montenay was born in Toulouse. She came from an affluent military family, but was orphaned when young and was taken into the court by the Queen of Navarre, whom she served first as fille d'honneur and later as dame d'honneur. Her position enabled her to acquire a thorough grounding in the classics and exposed her to Evangelism. She died at Sainte-Germier, near Toulouse.

== Emblemes ou Devises Chrestiennes ==
Montenay's book is an important milestone in the history of emblem books, inasmuch as it was written by a female member of the Reformed (Calvinist) faith. Montenay claims in her foreword that the book represents the first collection of Christian emblems. However, there are earlier emblematic works such as Claude Paradin's "Devises heroiques" (Lyons:, 1551; 1557). Montenay's Emblemes signals the beginning of a systematic exploitation of these emblems in religious propaganda. It was illustrated using allegorical engravings by Pierre Woeiriot rather than the more traditional woodcuts. It is unusual in calling for participation by the reader in recognising biblical allusions, both verbal and visual, and serves to both educate and entertain.

Montenay's work was thought to have first appeared in 1571, but a copy in the Royal Library in Copenhagen shows that it first appeared in 1567 and had been languishing in the hands of her publishers, Jean Marcorelle and Philippe de Castellas, since 1561. The delay may be explained by the religious turmoil of the time making early publication unwise. The Peace of Saint-Germain in 1570 raised hopes which were soon dashed by the 1572 St. Bartholomew's Day Massacre. In 1584 a Latin version was published, followed in 1619 by the Frankfurt-am-Main polyglot edition in Spanish, Italian, German, English and Dutch. The same illustrations are used in all three editions, so that the plates needed moving between Lyons, Zurich and Frankfurt. The motto or title included in each engraving is in Latin, and is invariably a quotation from the Vulgate version of the Bible, a book with which the common people shared an easy familiarity. The reader was expected to be able to place the quotations in context.

The Scottish calligrapher Esther Inglis revised an emblem by Montenay to honour her patron, Marie Stewart, Countess of Mar. The illustration of the "wise woman who builds her house" from Proverbs 14:1, originally identified the wise woman as Jeanne d'Albret.

== Bibliography ==
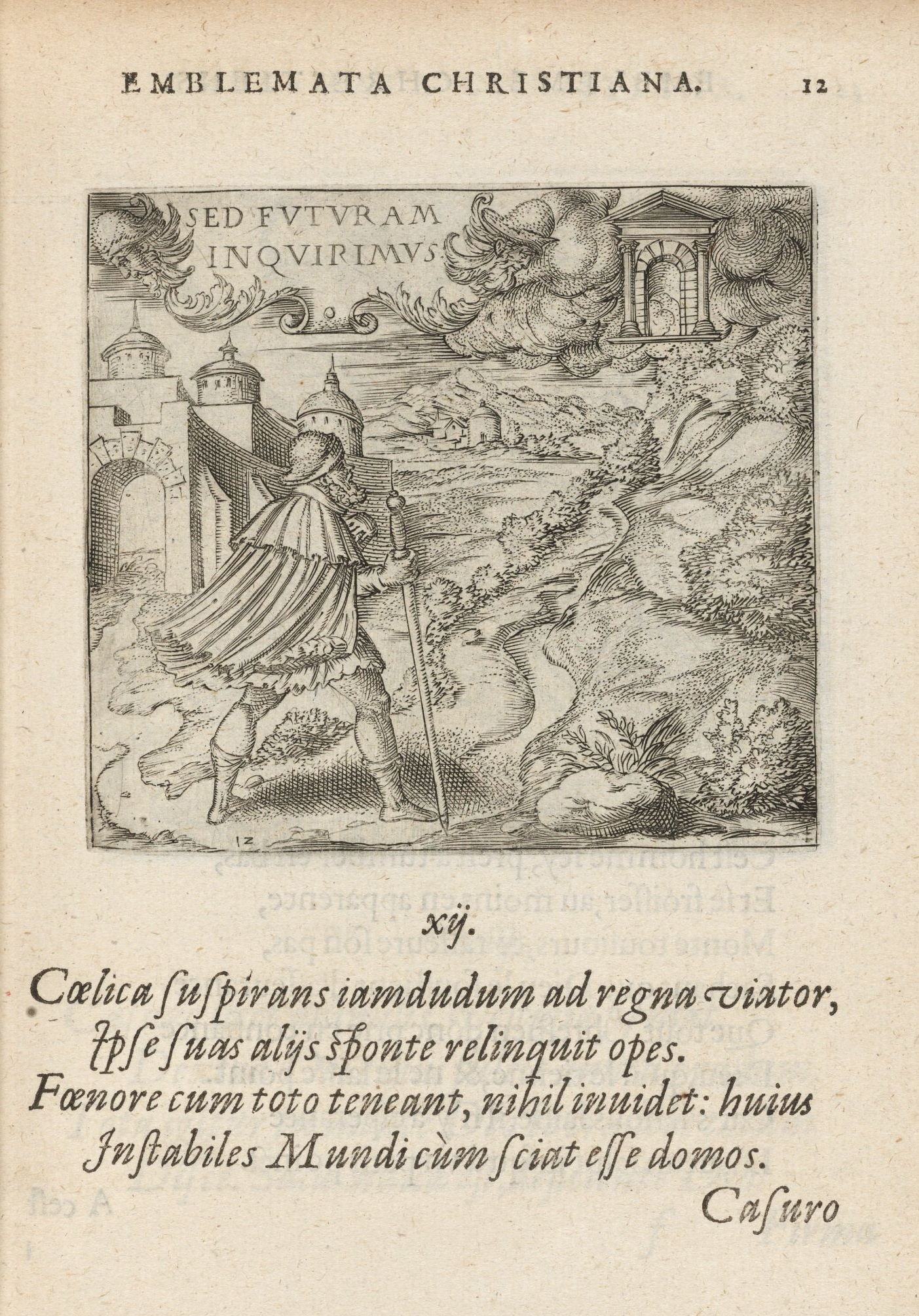
An illustration from a 1584 edition of Emblematum christianorum centuria

- Alison Adams, Stephen Rawles, Alison Saunders, A Bibliography of French Emblem Books, 2 vols (Geneva: Droz, 1999–2002)
- Montenay, Georgette de, Emblemes ou devises chrestiennes (1571), ed. Christopher N. Smith (Menston: Scolar Press, 1973). Facsimile reprint.
- Adams, Alison, ‘Les emblemes ou devises chrestiennes de Georgette de Montenay: édition de 1567’ (2000)
- Adams, Alison, ‘Georgette de Montenay’s Emblemes ou devises chrestiennes, 1567: New Dating, New Context’ (2001)
- Adams, Alison, Webs of Allusion: French Protestant Emblem Books of the Sixteenth Century (Geneva: Droz, 2003)
- Reynolds-Cornell, Regine, Witnessing an Era: Georgette de Montenay and the Emblemes ou Devises Chrestiennes (Birmingham, AL: Summa Publications, 1987).
- Paulette Choné, Emblèmes et pensées symboliques en Lorraine (1525-1633) (Paris: Klincksieck, 1991)
- Labrousse, Elisabeth & Jean-Philippe, ‘Georgette de Montenay et Guyon du Gout son époux’, Bulletin de la Société archéologique, historique, littéraire et scientifique du Gers (1990)
