= Foot roasting =

Method of torture

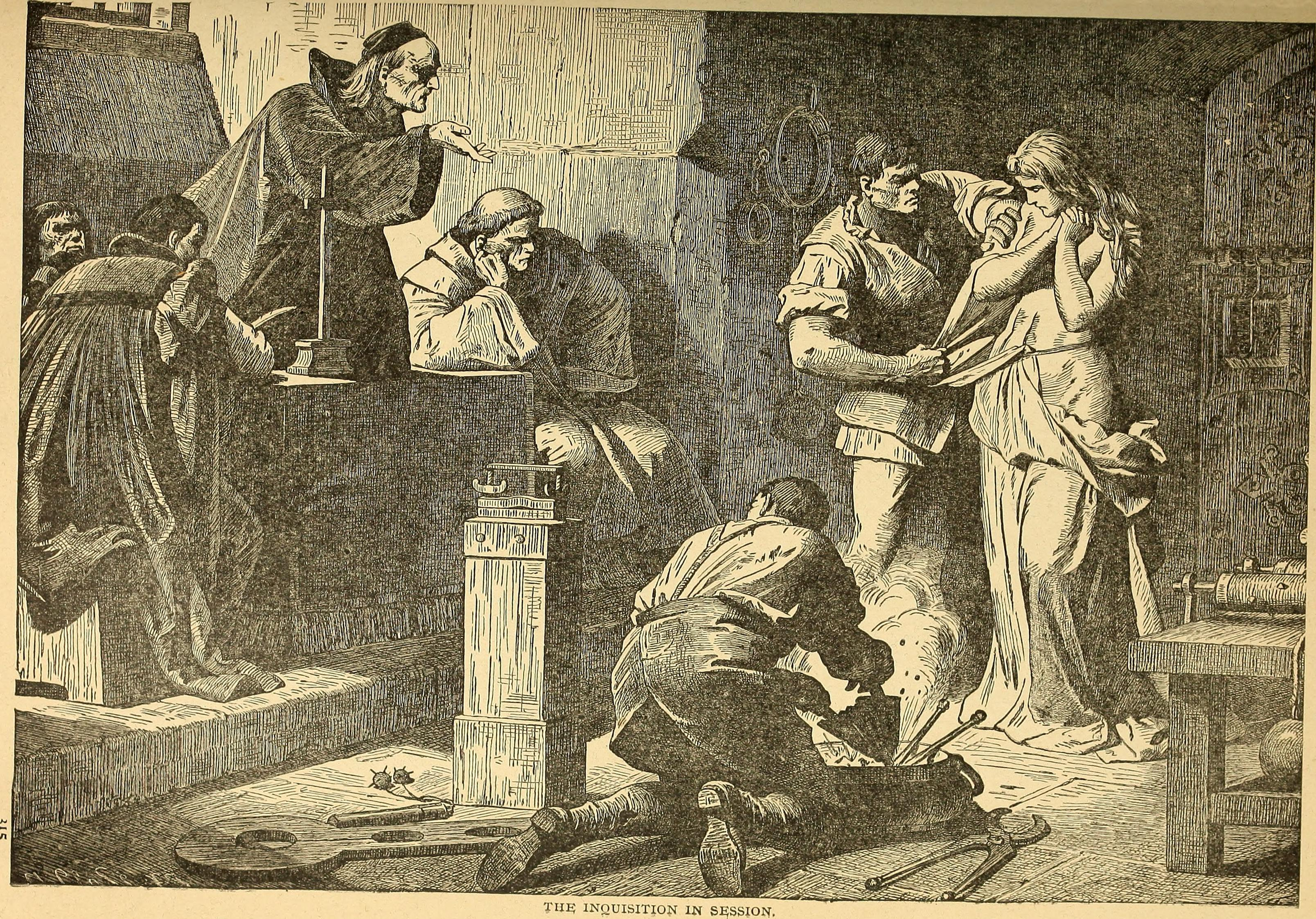
Engraving of the Spanish Inquisition where a woman is being prepared for torture.

Foot roasting is a method of torture used since ancient times.

== Ancient Rome ==
The Romans immobilized the prisoner and pressed red-hot iron plates to the soles of his feet. The Spanish Inquisition bound the prisoner face-upward to the rack with his bare feet secured in a stocks. The soles of the feet were basted with lard or oil and slowly barbecued over a brazier of burning coals. A screen could be interposed between the feet and the coals to modulate the exposure, while a bellows controlled the intensity of the flame. A version that consisted of a chair with integrated foot stocks was referred to as the Spanish chair, but this is readily confused with the Iron chair. By way of contrast, in the Brittany chair, the coals were held in a movable iron tray which could be cranked upward until it actually made contact with the feet. Added diversions included placing slivers of hot coals between the toes, or suspending the prisoner head-downward and placing hot coals directly on the soles. The destruction of the Order of the Knights Templars is credited largely to foot roasting, which was committed with savagery sufficient to, literally, drive the sufferers to insanity; Knights also had their toes denailed.

It horrifies our sensibilities that even young children were occasionally subjected to the foot roasting torture. The underlying theory was that the shock and horror of the unbelievably savage agony would likely induce immediate compliance with the torturer's demands, thereby restricting physical injury to an absolute minimum.

== Brittany ==
In Brittany, a torture chair was used that immobilized the feet and provided a movable tray of coals that could be cranked up and down, eventually making physical contact with the soles of the feet.

== Star kicking ==
A form of torture called "star kicking" supposedly began with Countess Elizabeth Bathory, who derived sadistic pleasure from placing oiled bits of paper or string between her prisoners’ toes and lighting the material on fire, inflicting savage burns.
