= Pierre Woeiriot =

French engraver, goldsmith, painter, sculptor and medallist

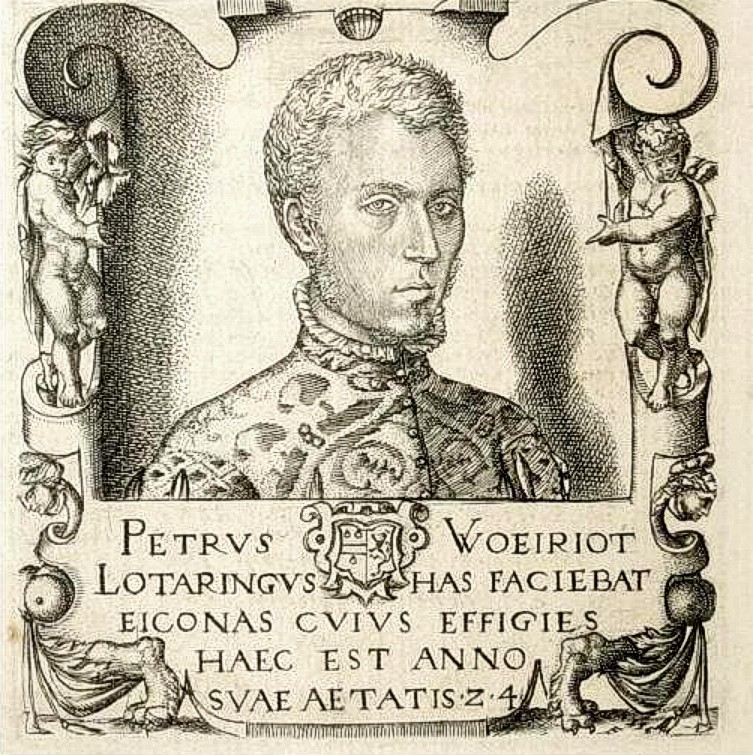
Self portrait (1556)

Pierre Woeiriot de Bouzey (1532–1596?) was a French engraver, goldsmith, painter, sculptor and medallist.

== Personal history ==
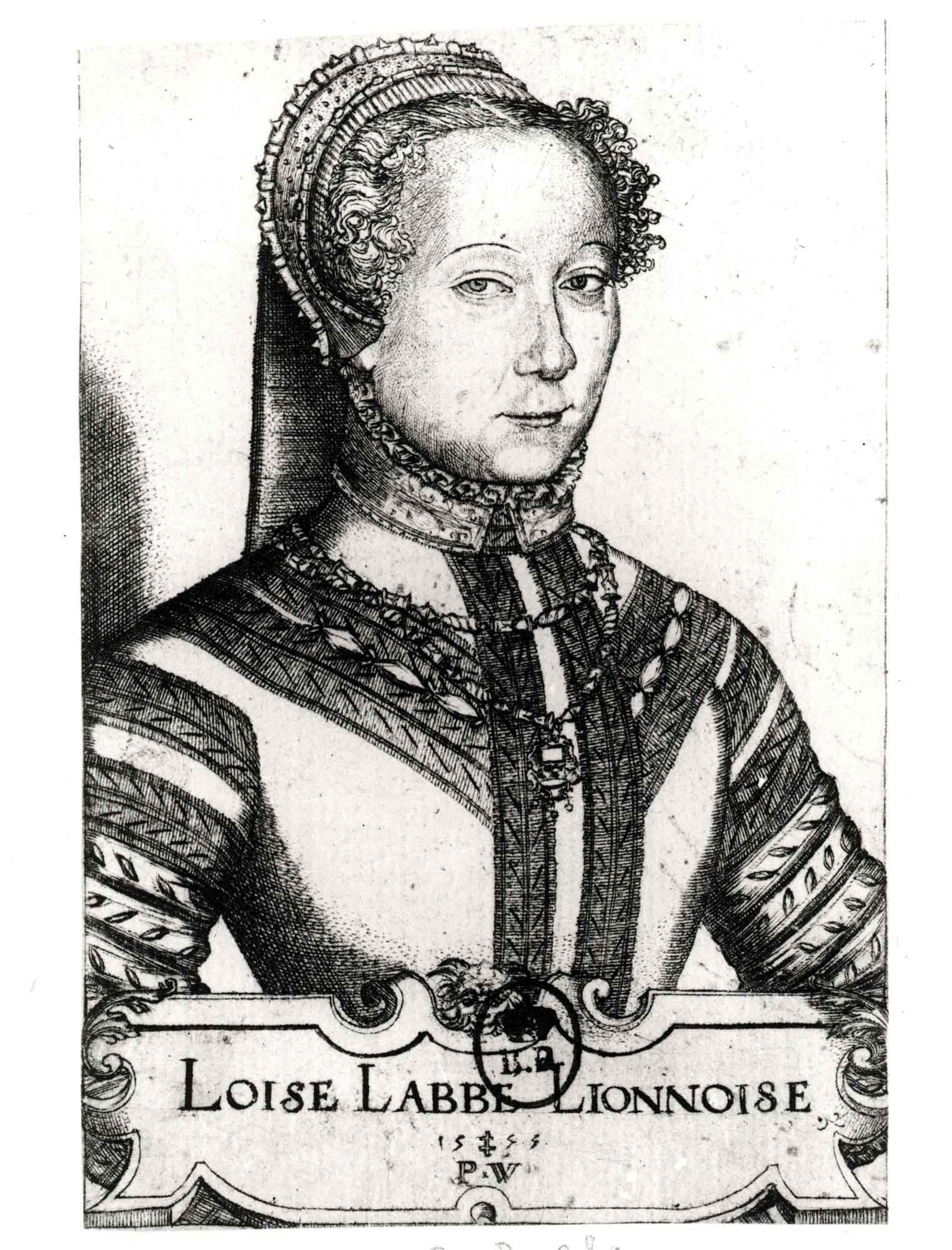
Louise Labé from Lyon (1555)

Woeiriot was born in Neufchâteau, Vosges. His father and grandfather had been goldsmiths, and he followed their trade until about 1555, after which he devoted all his time to engraving. In that year he received two commissions for Lilio Gregorio Giraldi and Clément Baudin's Pinax iconicus antiquorum ac variorum in sepulturis rituum, published in 1556, and the Livre d'anneaux published in 1561, dedicated to the poet Barthélemy Aneau. About 1556 he created three engravings with historical or mythological allusions, the Bull of Phalaris, Hasdrubal's Wife Throwing Herself on the Pyre and Phocas Led Captive before Heraclius.

Contrary to what was previously thought, Woeiriot did not go to Italy in 1550, but stayed in Lyon until about 1559-60 after which he left for Rome. By the end of 1561 he was in Nancy, making frequent visits to Lyon until 1571. On 1 December 1561 he agreed to engrave 36 plates illustrating the Old Testament for the dealer Antoine God, and these appeared in 1580. Influenced by the poet Louis Des Masures, he became a Protestant. Between 1566 and 1571 he illustrated the Emblemes ou devises chrestiennes by Georgette de Montenay, lady-in-waiting to Jeanne d'Albret, mother of Henry IV of France. He moved to Damblain, Haute-Marne, in 1572, and died there.

== Illustrated works ==
- Antiquarum Statuarum Urbis Romae Liber Primus
- Austrasiae Reges et Duces Epigrammatis - Clement Nicolas de Treille, Cologne 1591

== Gallery ==
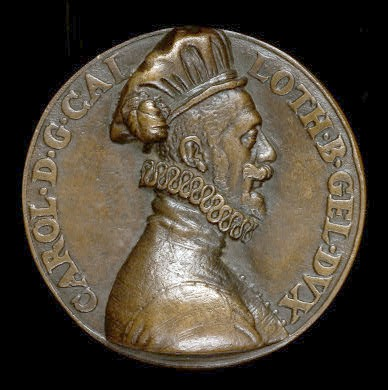
Charles II, Duke of Lorraine

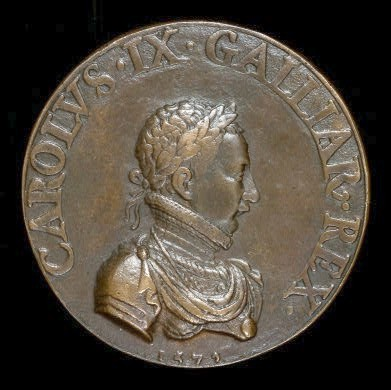
Charles IX of France
