= Tickle torture =

Use of tickling to abuse an individual

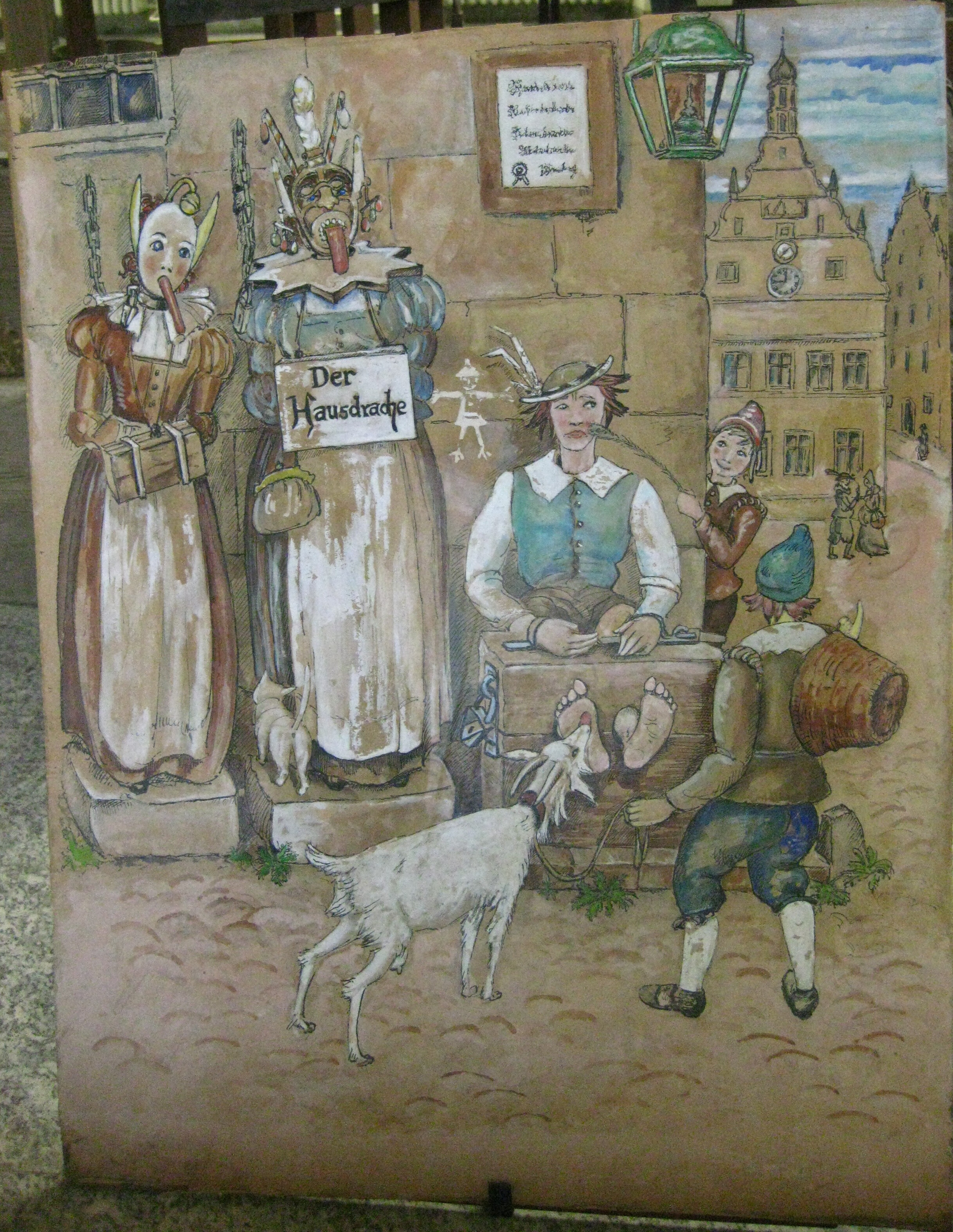
A painting at the Rothenburg criminal museum, depicting criminals placed in stocks. The town people would tickle them and put salt on their feet so goats would lick the feet.

Tickle torture is the prolonged use of tickling to abuse, dominate, harass, humiliate, or interrogate an individual. While laughter is popularly thought of as a pleasure response, in tickle torture, the one being tickled may laugh whether or not they find the experience pleasant. In a tickling situation, laughter can indicate a panic reflex rather than a pleasure response.

== Historical examples ==
In ancient Japan, those in positions of authority could administer punishments to those convicted of crimes that were beyond the criminal code. These punishments were called shikei, which translates as ‘private punishment.’ One such torture was kusuguri-zeme (擽り責め), which means ‘merciless tickling’.

An article in the British Medical Journal about European tortures describes a method of torture called the "goat's tongue" in which a goat was compelled to lick the victim's feet because they had been dipped in salt water. Once the goat had licked the salt off, the victim's feet would be dipped in the salt water again and the process would be repeated. However, it remains unclear if this method was ever used in practice as it is only described in the 1502 Tractatus de indiciis et tortura by the Italian jurist and monk Franciscus Brunus de San Severino – a treatise that actually cautioned against torture in general – and while it seems clear that Franciscus Brunus had not made up this practice, the issue is left open whether the inclusion in the treatise is based on hearsay, (reliable) eye-witness accounts, or personal experience. This uncertainty does not preclude this anecdote from being repeated in popular culture, such as in a 2013 episode of the British satirical quiz show QI.

An 1887 article entitled "England in Old Times" states, "Gone, too, are the parish stocks, in which offenders against public morality formerly sat imprisoned, with their legs held fast beneath a heavy wooden yoke, while sundry small but fiendish boys improved the occasion by deliberately pulling off their shoes and then tickling the soles of their defenseless feet."

A 1903 New York Times article described an immobilized suicidal patient at the Hudson River State Hospital who was tied to a bed for his own safety. While he lay helpless, the patient's feet were tickled by one of the hospital attendants, Frank A. Sanders. "Sanders is said to have confessed that while intoxicated he amused himself by tickling the feet and ribs of Hayes and pulling his nose." Sanders also gave his restrained victim a black eye. Another hospital employee came upon Sanders while he was entertaining himself at his patient's expense, and Sanders was brought before a grand jury.

Heinz Heger, a man imprisoned in the Flossenbürg concentration camp during World War II, witnessed Nazi prison guards perform tickle torture on a fellow inmate. He describes this incident in his book The Men with the Pink Triangle: "The first game that the SS sergeant and his men played was to tickle their victim with goose feathers, on the soles of his feet, between his legs, in the armpits, and on other parts of his naked body. At first the prisoner forced himself to keep silent, while his eyes twitched in fear and torment from one SS man to the other. Then he could not restrain himself and finally he broke out in a high-pitched laughter that very soon turned into a cry of pain, while the tears ran down his face, and his body twisted against his chains. After this tickling torture, they let the lad hang there for a little, while a flood of tears ran down his cheeks and he cried and sobbed uncontrollably."

In Vernon Wiehe's book Sibling Abuse, he published his research findings regarding 150 adults who were abused by their siblings during childhood. Several reported tickling as a type of physical abuse they experienced, and based on these reports it was revealed that abusive tickling is capable of provoking extreme physiological reactions in the victim, such as vomiting, urinary incontinence, and losing consciousness due to inability to breathe.

== See also ==
- Death from laughter
- Rusalka
- Tickle fetishism
