= Rope (torture) =

Instrument of torture used by the Huguenots

The rope was an instrument of torture used by the Huguenots in their persecution of Catholics, and involved sawing the human body with a hard-fibered rope.

The victim would be stripped naked, and dragged back and forth across the rope while the fibers cut into the flesh.
