= Brazen bull =

Torture and execution device

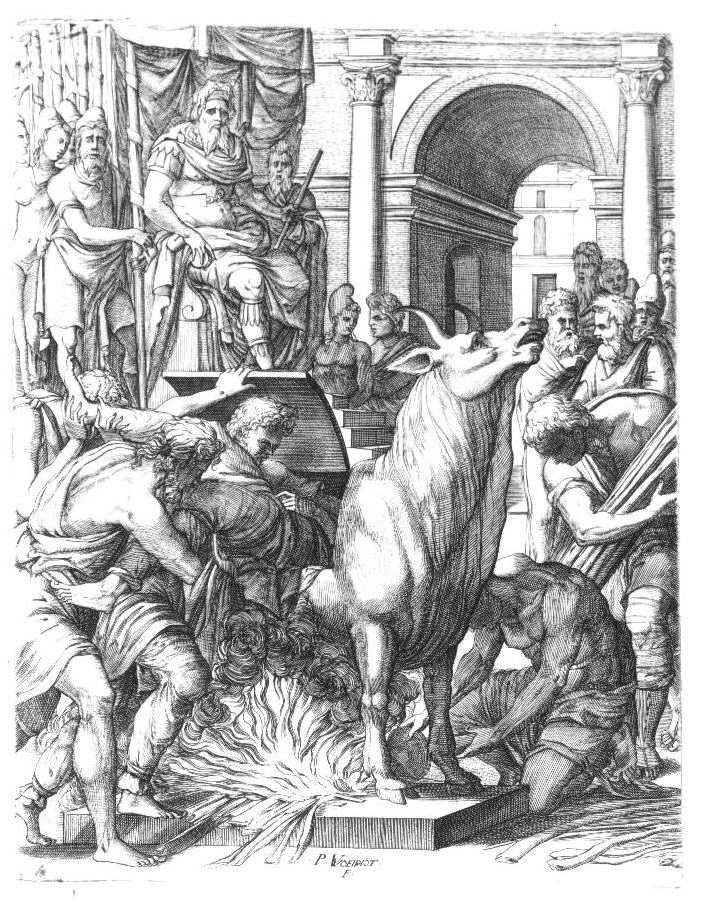
- Perilaus being forced into the brazen bull that he built for Phalaris, as depicted by Pierre Woeiriot
- Type: Torture device
- Inventor: Perilaus of Athens
- Inception: 6th century BC
- Manufacturer: Perilaus of Athens

The brazen bull, also known as the bronze bull, Sicilian bull, bellowing bull or bull of Phalaris, was a torture and execution device designed in ancient Greece. According to Diodorus Siculus, recounting the story in Bibliotheca historica, Perilaus (Περίλαος) (or Perillus (Πέριλλος)) of Athens invented and proposed it to Phalaris, the tyrant of Akragas, Sicily, as a new means of execution. The bull was said to have been hollow, and made entirely of bronze, with a door in one side. According to legend, the condemned were locked inside the device (with their head aligned within the bull's head), and a fire was set beneath it, heating the metal to the extent that the person within slowly roasted to death. The bull was equipped with an internal acoustic apparatus that converted the screams of the dying into what sounded like the bellows of a bull. The bull's design was such that steam from the cooking flesh of the condemned exited the bull's nostrils; this effect—along with the bull's "bellows"—created the illusion that the bull came to life during every execution. Pindar, who lived less than a century later, expressly associates this instrument of torture with the name of the tyrant Phalaris. The truth about the brazen bull is difficult to verify, and it may have been created for intimidation rather than actual use.

== Creation of the brazen bull for Phalaris ==
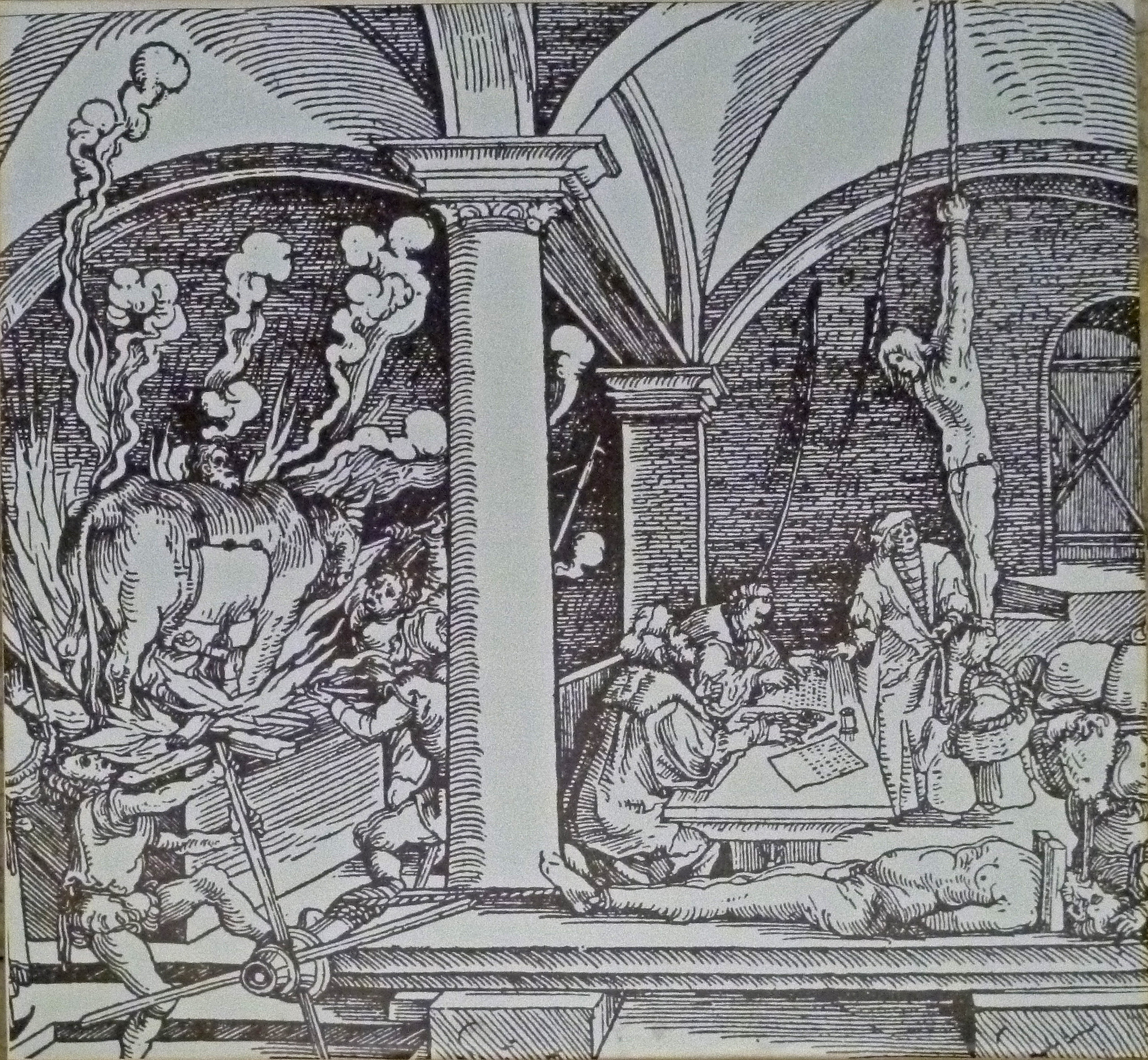
The brazen bull depicted in an engraving by Hans Burgkmair

The head of the bull was purportedly designed with a system of tubes and stops so that the prisoner's screams were converted into sounds like the bellowing of an infuriated bull. Phalaris is said to have commanded that the bull be designed in such a way that its smoke rose in spicy clouds of incense. According to legend, when the bull was reopened after a body was charred, the victim's scorched bones then "shone like jewels and were made into bracelets."

After finishing construction on the execution device, Perilaus said to Phalaris: "His screams will come to you through the pipes as the tenderest, most pathetic, most melodious of bellowings." Perilaus believed he would receive a reward for his invention. Instead, Phalaris, who was disgusted by these words, ordered its horn sound system to be tested by Perilaus himself, tricking him into getting in the bull. When Perilaus entered, he was immediately locked in and the fire was set, so that Phalaris could hear the sound of Perilaus' screams. Before Perilaus could die, Phalaris ordered him removed from the bull. After freeing him from the bull, Phalaris is then said to have had Perilaus thrown to his death from atop a high cliff. Phalaris himself is claimed to have been killed in the brazen bull when he was overthrown by Telemachus, the ancestor of Theron.

== Persecution of early Christians ==
Christian sources have claimed that Romans used this torture device to kill some Christians, notably Saint Eustace, who, according to Christian tradition, was roasted in a brazen bull with his wife and children by Emperor Hadrian. The same happened to Saint Antipas, Bishop of Pergamum during the persecutions by Emperor Domitian, and the first martyr in Asia Minor, who was roasted to death in a brazen bull in 92 AD. The device is claimed to have still been in use two centuries later, when by some legends, another Christian, Pelagia of Tarsus, is said to have been burned in one in 287 AD by the Emperor Diocletian.

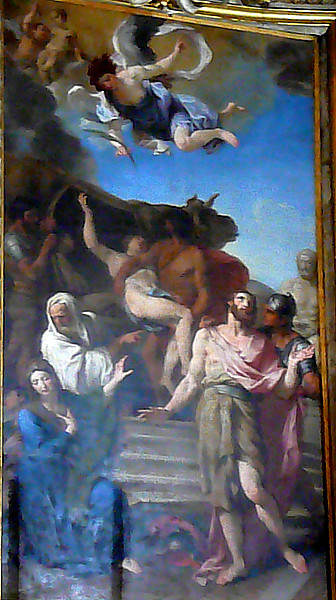
Francesco Ferdinandi, The Martyrdom of St. Eustace. Behind the main altar at the Church of Sant'Eustachio, Rome, this painting follows the narrative in the Golden Legend: For refusing to sacrifice to the gods, Saint Eustace and his wife and sons are to be executed in a brazen bull.

== See also ==
- Outline of capital punishment
- Iron maiden – Mythical torture device
- Moloch – Canaanite deity or form of human sacrifice
- Pasiphaë – Queen of Crete in Greek mythology
- Red Drum killings – 1972 mass killing in Thailand
- Wicker man – Reported ancient Celtic method of human sacrifice by fire
