= Boot (torture) =

Torture and interrogation instruments

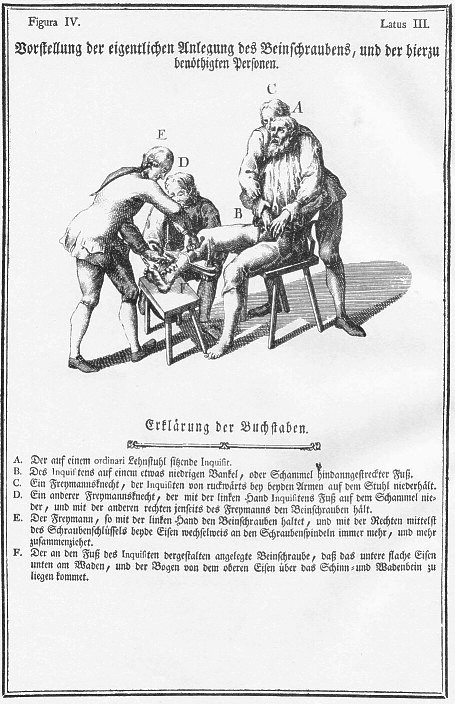
Leg screwing

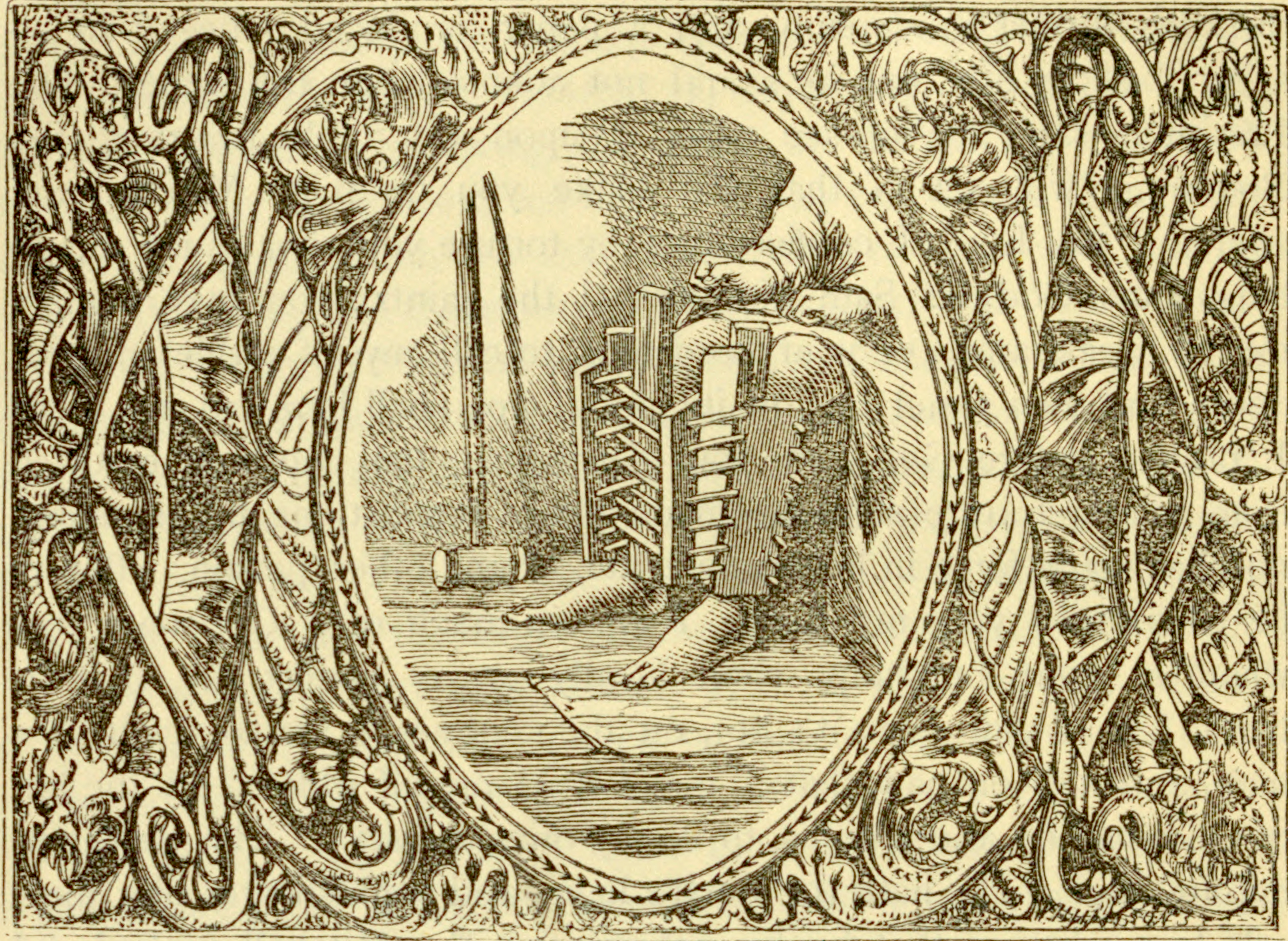
The boots from James Mitchell in Scots Worthies

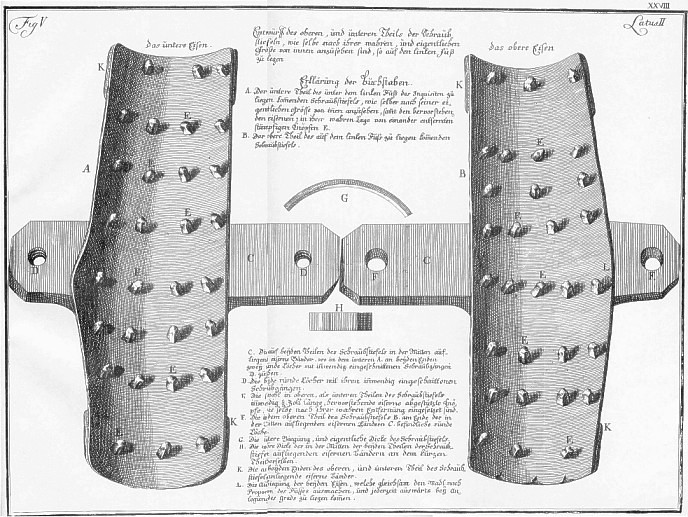

The term boot refers to a family of instruments of torture and interrogation variously designed to cause crushing injuries to the foot and/or leg. The boot has taken many forms in various places and times. Common varieties include the Spanish boot (sometimes referred to as "scarpines") and the Malay boot. One type was made of four pieces of narrow wooden board nailed together. The boards were measured to fit the victim's leg. Once the leg was enclosed, wedges would be hammered between the boards, creating pressure. The pressure would be increased until the victim confessed or lost consciousness.

== Spanish boot ==
The Spanish boot was an iron casing for the leg and foot. Wood or iron wedges were hammered in between the casing and the victim's flesh. A similar device, commonly referred to as a shin crusher, squeezed the calf between two curved iron plates, studded with spikes, teeth, or knobs, to fracture the tibia and fibula.

Primitive forerunners of the archetype can be found dating back as far as a thousand years. The first Scottish effort, also referred to as a buskin, made use of a boot-shaped rawhide garment that was soaked with water, drawn over the foot and lower leg, and then bound in place with cords. The contraption was slowly heated over a gentle fire, drastically contracting the rawhide and squeezing the foot until it dislocated the bones of the foot and ankle, though there would not have been sufficient pressure to actually crush them.

A more progressive variant, found in both the British Isles and France, consisted of a trio of upright wooden boards that were splinted around and between the feet, and then tied in place with cords. Wedges were then hammered between the boards and the feet to dislocate and crush the bones. This was nearly identical to the Chinese torture known as jiagun. A similar progressive variant from Ancient India was the kittee, a simple wooden machine resembling a lemon press which slowly crushed the bare foot. .

Other variations of the Spanish Boot used temperature, rather than pressure to inflict pain. A prototype hailing from Autun, France, consisted of high boots of spongy, porous leather that were drawn over the feet and legs. Boiling water was poured over the boots, eventually soaking through the leather and eating away at the flesh of the entrapped limbs. In a similar example, the prisoner's feet were placed in oversized boots of iron or copper, which were often fixed to the floor. These were then slowly filled with boiling water, oil, or molten lead to consume the feet and legs. One example —applied in Ireland to the martyr Dermot O'Hurley—consisted of lightweight metal boots that were filled with cool water and heated with the feet inside over a fire until it boiled aggressively.

== Other implements for foot torture ==
A similar implement, the foot press, consisted of a pair of horizontal iron plates slowly tightened around the bare foot by means of a crank mechanism, squeezing the foot with sufficient force to pulverize the bones. Although it was quite standard to line the lower plate with ribs to prevent the foot from popping out of the grip of the instrument as it became sweatier, a crueler variant of this device—typically encountered in Nuremberg, Germany—lined the upper plate with hundreds of sharp spikes.

The instep borer was a putative medieval instrument of torture that externally resembled an iron boot into which the prisoner's bare foot was locked. Turning an external crank slowly advanced a serrated iron blade into the boot, boring a hole through the center of the instep. The only source that documents the device (Hirsch, A. E., ed., The Book of Torture and Executions, Toronto: Golden Books, 1944) indicates that it comes from Spain. This itself is questionable, since torture technology was much less sophisticated in Spain than in, e.g., Germany. Moreover, the very design and engineering of such an intricate device is not consonant with the Spaniards' preference for simple—but highly effective—tortures like foot roasting.

A version of the boot from Venice, sometimes called the foot screw or toe breaker, connected the crank mechanism to a drill that slowly mutilated the foot by boring a hole through the center of the instep as the press was tightened. Further, a spike might be positioned over the big toe, which punctured the nail and savagely tortured the sensitive nail bed as the press was tightened. The "toe breaker" from Nuremberg was a wider instrument that accommodated both feet, side by side, simultaneously applying inexorable crushing pressure to all ten toes. Were the prisoner particularly stubborn or strong-willed, the press could be tightened until the plates met, so grinding the foot bones to powder.

In The Big Book of Pain, Donnelly and Diehl present an ingenious and diabolical iron torture boot. The configurable device completely encloses the naked foot. The roomy toe box is filled with iron spikes, teeth, and burs. A vertical plate behind the prisoner's heel fits into a grooved track and can be forced forward by turning a wheel. The steadily increasing pressure first forces the toes against the spikes, mangling their flesh and crushing their bones. Under continued inexorable pressure, the bones of the instep eventually give way until the arch of the foot is shattered. The heel bone is sufficiently powerful to withstand the torture, although the heel is not generously provided with afferent pain nociceptors.

Another variation occasionally seen (Scott, 1991) is a compartment beneath the sole of the prisoner's foot that can be filled with red-hot coals.

== Bibliography ==
- Melville, R. D. (April 1905). "The Use and Forms of Judicial Torture in England and Scotland". The Scottish Historical Review. 2 (7): 225–248.
