= Denailing =

Removal of nails from fingers or toes

Denailing is the extraction of the nails from the fingers and/or toes, either as an accident, a medical procedure to treat severe nail infections, or as a method of torture.

== Health consequences ==
Removed nails are capable of growing back normally over several months if the nail matrix is left intact through surgical extraction. However, if the matrix is damaged by trauma, it can result in an overgrowth of tissue from the proximal nail fold, resulting in the formation of pterygium. Particularly, if the nail matrix is burnt by a heated instrument, subsequent growth may produce nails which are striped, thin, or broken into longitudinal segments.

== History of use as torture ==
The United Nations Istanbul Protocol describes nail removal and the insertion of sharp objects such as wires and glass shards under the nail as forms of torture. Nails were historically torn out with a variety of iron devices, some applied red-hot, while modern torturers prefer a deliberate, precise extraction by surgical scalpel.

In the aftermath of Italy's republican referendum after World War II, efforts to prosecute former officials in the Fascist government for collaborationism and war crimes resulted in the legal differentiation between the concepts of normal brutality, cruel brutality, and particularly cruel brutality. Only in the case of particularly cruel brutality would the accused be rejected for amnesty. Denailing was generally considered to fall under the first two categories, as for a brutality to be considered particularly cruel, it had to "horrify even those who are familiar with torture."

== Modern use ==
=== Venezuela ===
Venezuelan activist Ángela Expósito has been subject to denailing while in detention, starting in 2018, among other torture methods. The Independent International Fact-Finding Mission on Venezuela documented that senior lieutenant Franklin Caldera, detained on 2019 during the Nicolás Maduro administration, was subjected to several methods of torture, including cutting and insertion of needles under his fingernails. On 3 November 2022, pro-government colectivos attacked and denailed four female students of the University of the Andes that were protesting against the visit in Mérida state of Diosdado Cabello, vice-president of the United Socialist Party of Venezuela (PSUV).

=== Nicaragua ===
Under the Daniel Ortega administration, political prisoners in Nicaragua have been subjected to torture, including denailing.

== In film ==
Some films have denailing scenes:

- Closet Land, 1991
- Syriana, 2005
- The Wind That Shakes the Barley, 2006
- District 9, 2009
- The Gray Man, 2022
- Pathaan, 2023
- Viduthalai - Part 1, 2023
- Bad Boys: Ride or Die, 2024
- Novocaine (2025 film) 2025

== See also ==
- Nail (anatomy)
- List of methods of torture
