= Bankruptcy barrel =

Visual trope used to represent extreme poverty

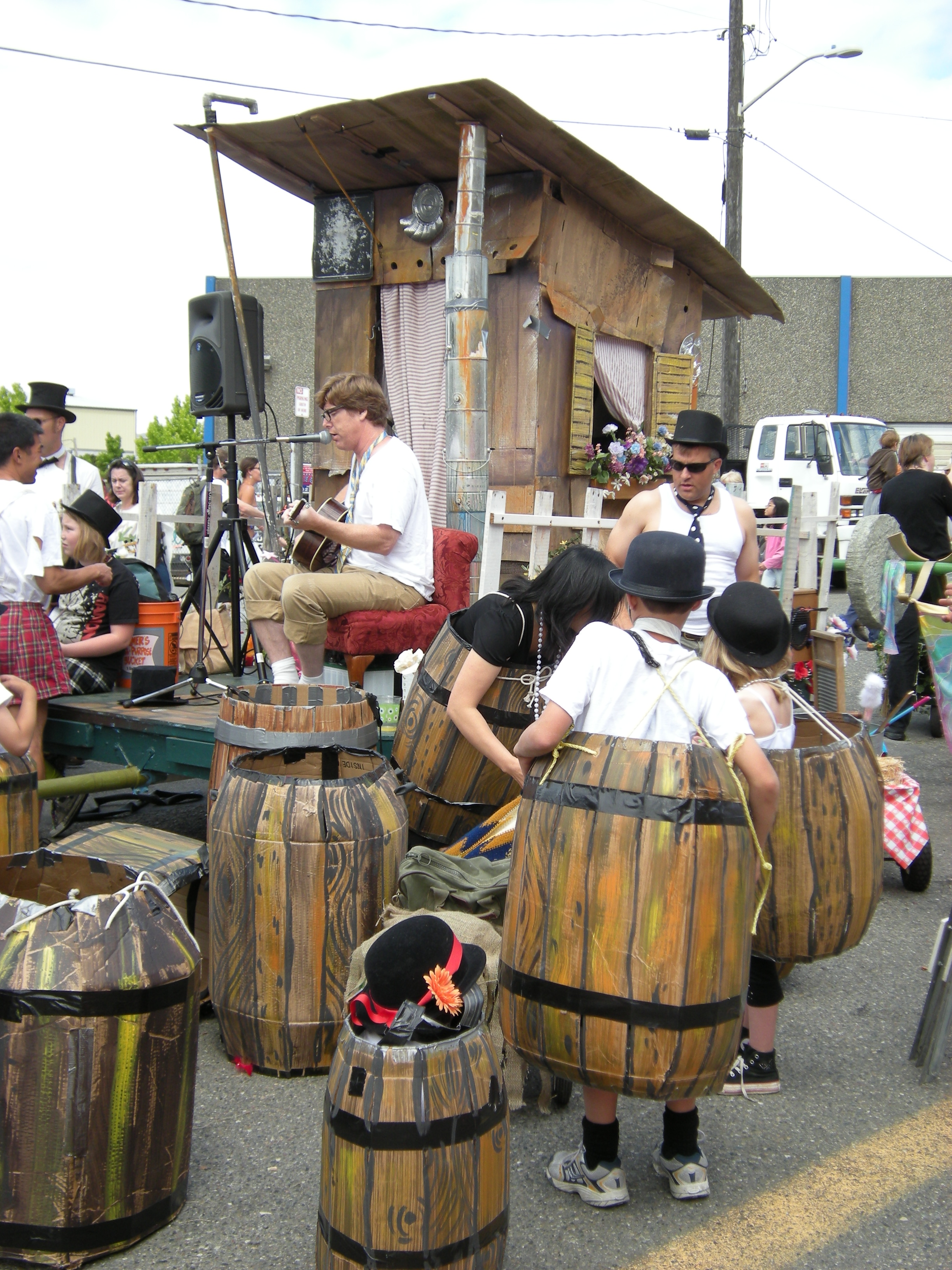
Shanty float with foot contingent wearing bankruptcy barrels for a Great Depression themed parade entry

The bankruptcy barrel is a visual symbol, primarily of the 20th century, used in cartoons and other media as a token of destitution. Not intended to be realistic, it consists of a suit made of only a wooden barrel held on by suspenders, indicating that the subject is so poor that he is unable to afford even clothes. It was a common representation of extreme poverty, appearing in many animated shorts, political cartoons, comedies, and other media.

== Origins and examples ==
The Max Fleischer animated short "Ace of Spades" in 1931 displayed several characters reduced to bankruptcy wearing barrels. Will Johnstone's editorial-cartoon character "the Tax Payer", first published in the New York World-Telegram in 1933 and regularly thereafter, showed the taxpayer reduced to wearing a barrel for clothing. Other cartoonists then copied this theme. Canadian cartoonist John Collins, editorial cartoonist of the Montreal Gazette from 1939 to 1982, commonly used the character "Uno Who" in his editorial cartoons. Uno Who was almost always shown wearing a bankruptcy barrel, and for much the same reason (high taxes) as Johnstone's taxpayer.

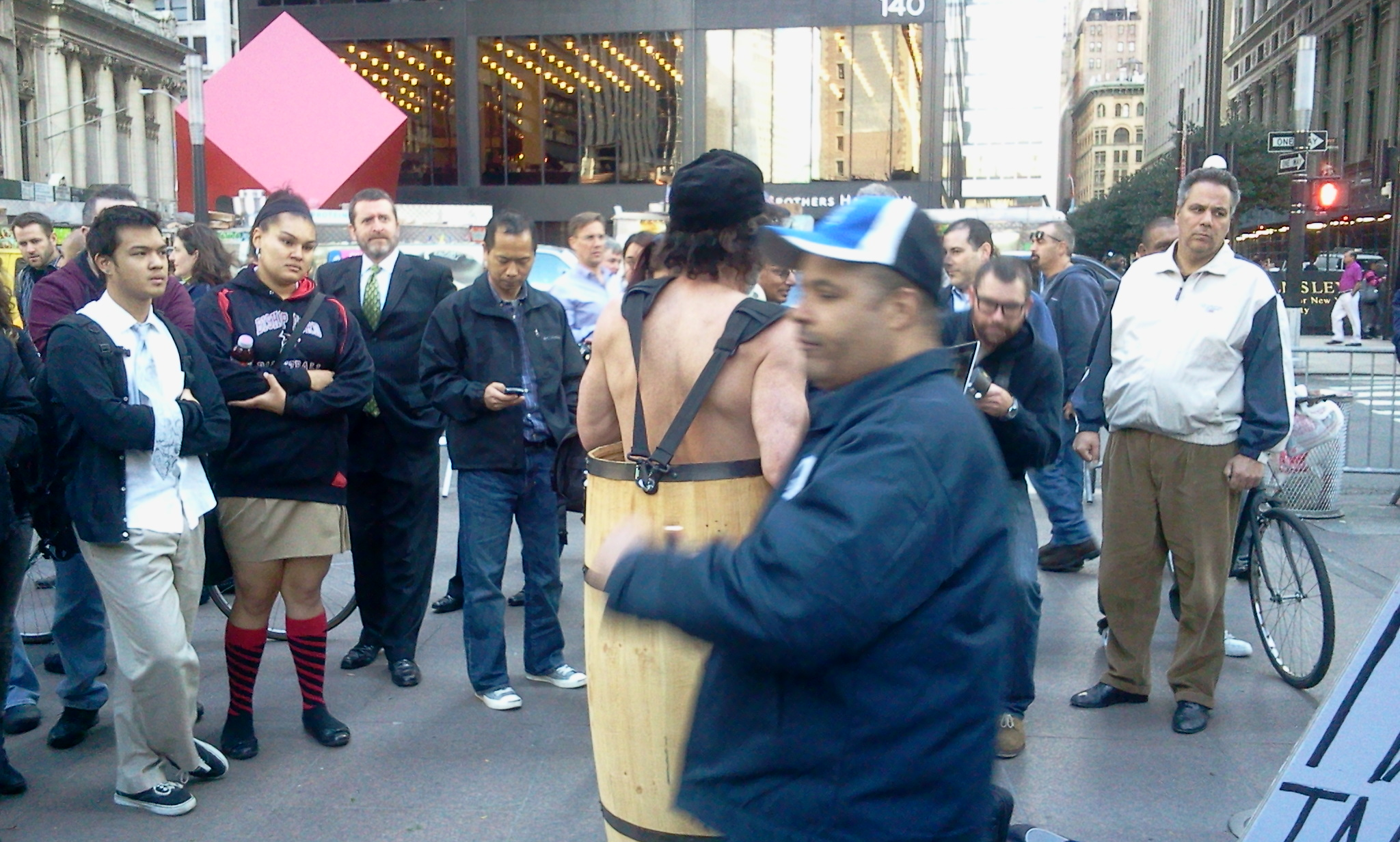
Man wearing a bankruptcy barrel at the Occupy Wall Street protests

The bankruptcy barrel has been used for other meanings such as the January 1989 edition of Esquire magazine which featured Robin Givens on the cover wearing the barrel in a somewhat seductive manner, showing her cleavage partially covered by the barrel and commenting that she was aiming at either going for broke or ending up a millionaire. It was also used in a 1999 Wendy's commercial referring to the dot com bubble where a destitute dot com magnate is left only with a barrel but can still afford a discounted Wendy's hamburger. However, Wendy's founder Dave Thomas (out of desire not to see him remove the barrel to fish for change) offers to pay for the man's meal. Moon Mullins was occasionally seen wearing a barrel after losing at cards. A 1987 episode of The Smurfs used it to denote debt, where the villain Gargamel had all his possessions seized to satisfy a debt, only for the collector to remark "I will be back for the barrel!"

However, the use of a barrel as clothing for comedic effect (rather than to necessarily show penury) goes back further; the hapless character is reduced to wearing a barrel for modesty because his clothes have been stolen or some other putatively amusing circumstance has arisen. George Etherege's 1664 comedy The Comical Revenge or, Love in a Tub included a barrel-wearing character. The 1921 film Tol'able David contains a scene with a character wearing a barrel. In "Hollywood Steps Out" and the first Captain Underpants book, the barrel is used as a visual euphemism implying that the character is actually naked.

== Drunkard's cloak ==
The bankruptcy barrel is similar to a drunkard's cloak, an actual punishment seen from medieval times forward (but now obsolete) as a sort of pillory to punish drunkards and other offenders.

Depictions of the drunkard's cloak usually show a barrel with a hole cut into the top for the head to pass through at the neck and two small holes cut in the sides for the arms (or just the hands) to pass through. This differs in detail from bankruptcy barrel, which is almost always shown with the top of the barrel at the armpits, the arms free above that, and the barrel held up by two straps passing over the shoulders.
