= Phalaris =

Sicilian despot, 570 to 554 BC

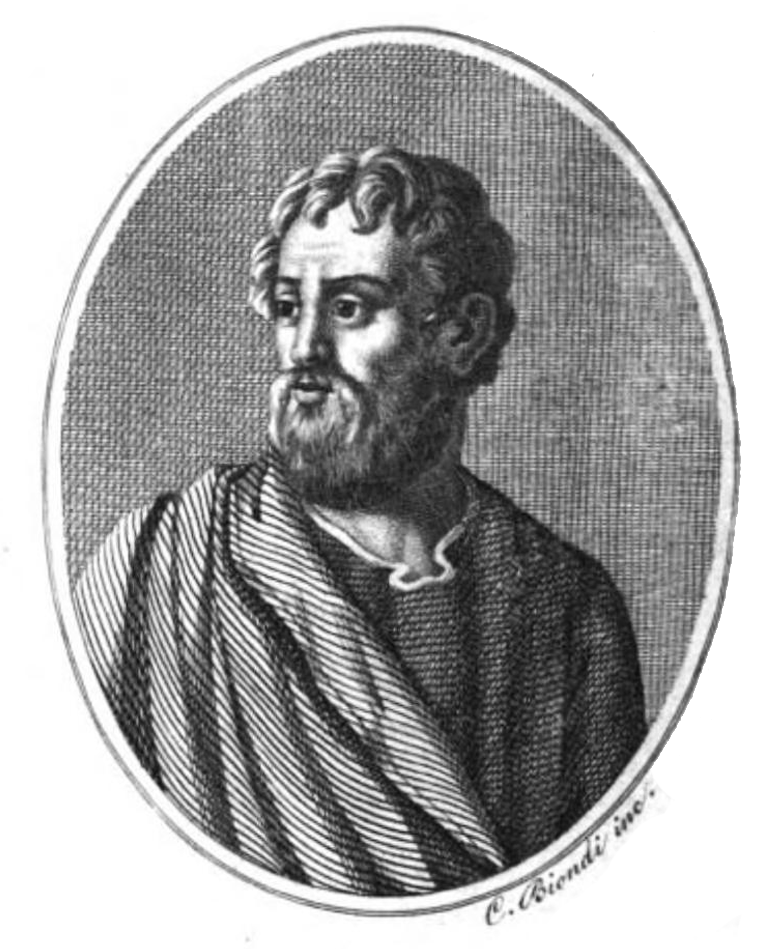
- Tyrant: c. 570–554 BC
- Died: 554 BC; Agrigento, Magna Graecia, Italy
- Religion: Ancient Greek

Phalaris (Greek: Φάλαρις) was the tyrant of Akragas (now Agrigento) in Sicily in Magna Graecia, from approximately 570 to 554 BC.

== History ==
Phalaris was renowned for his excessive cruelty. Among his alleged atrocities is cannibalism: he was said to have eaten suckling babies.

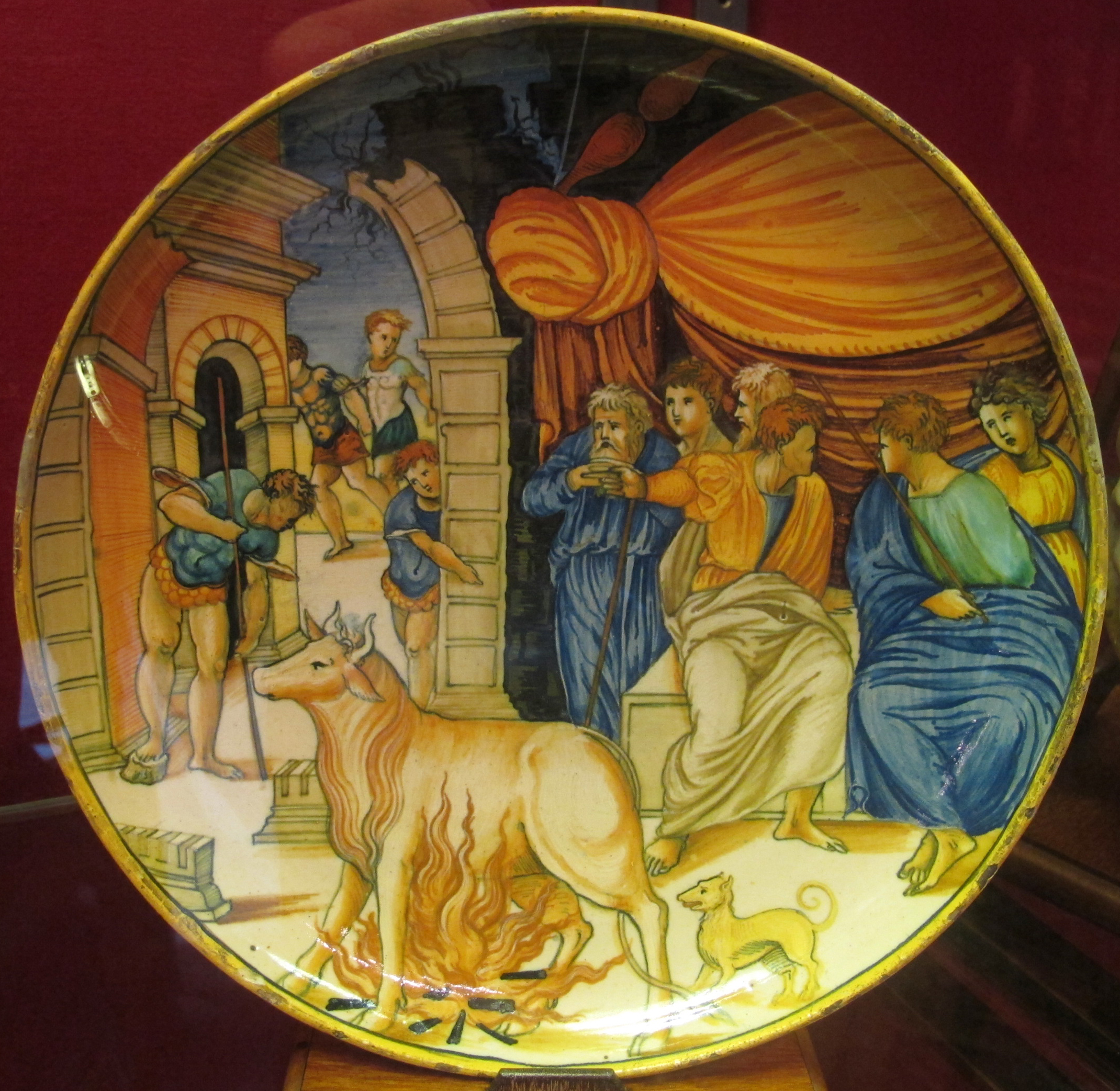
Plate depicting Phalaris' brazen bull, from the workshop of Nicola da Urbino (c. 1530)

Another expression of his sadistic brutality is that he supposedly ordered a sculptor named Perilaus to make him a brazen hollow bull. The bull could hold a man and was used as an execution machine. The condemned person was placed inside, then the bull was closed and a fire lit underneath. The sculpture was made in such a way that, while the condemned met a horrible death in the burning furnace, their cries were said to sound like the bellowing of a bull.

Phalaris was entrusted with the building of the temple of Zeus Atabyrius in the citadel and took advantage of his position to make himself tyrant. Under his rule, Agrigentum seemed to have attained considerable prosperity. He supplied the city with water, adorned it with fine buildings, and strengthened it with walls. On the northern coast of the island, the people of Himera elected him general with absolute power, in spite of the warnings of the poet Stesichorus. According to the Suda he succeeded in making himself master of the whole of the island.

He was at last overthrown in a general uprising headed by Telemachus, the ancestor of Theron of Acragas (tyrant c. 488–472 BC), and, in some versions of the legend, burned alive in his own brazen bull. Pindar, who lived less than a century afterwards, expressly associates this instrument of torture with the name of the tyrant, while Lucian mentions it in two satirical dialogues, "Phalaris A" and "Phalaris B", he wrote about the tyrant.

There was certainly a brazen bull at Agrigentum that was carried off by the Carthaginians to Carthage. This is said to have been later taken by Scipio Africanus and restored to Agrigentum circa 200 BC. However, it is more likely that it was Scipio Aemilianus who returned this bull and other stolen works of art to the original Sicilian cities, after his total destruction of Carthage circa 146 BC, which ended the Third Punic War.

== Pseudo-epistles ==
Despite his cruelties, Phalaris gained in medieval times a certain literary fame as the supposed author of an epistolary corpus. In 1699, Richard Bentley published an influential Dissertation on the Epistles of Phalaris, in which he proved that the epistles were misattributed and had actually been written around the 2nd century AD.
