= Turcas =

Torture device

The turcas is an instrument of torture. It is a simple vise, with protruding studs on the interior surfaces. The victim's thumbs or fingers were placed in the vise and slowly crushed, the nails pulled out. The turcas was also applied to wrench the nails off the prisoners' toes.
