= Wooden horse (device) =

Torture device used by the French and the Spanish

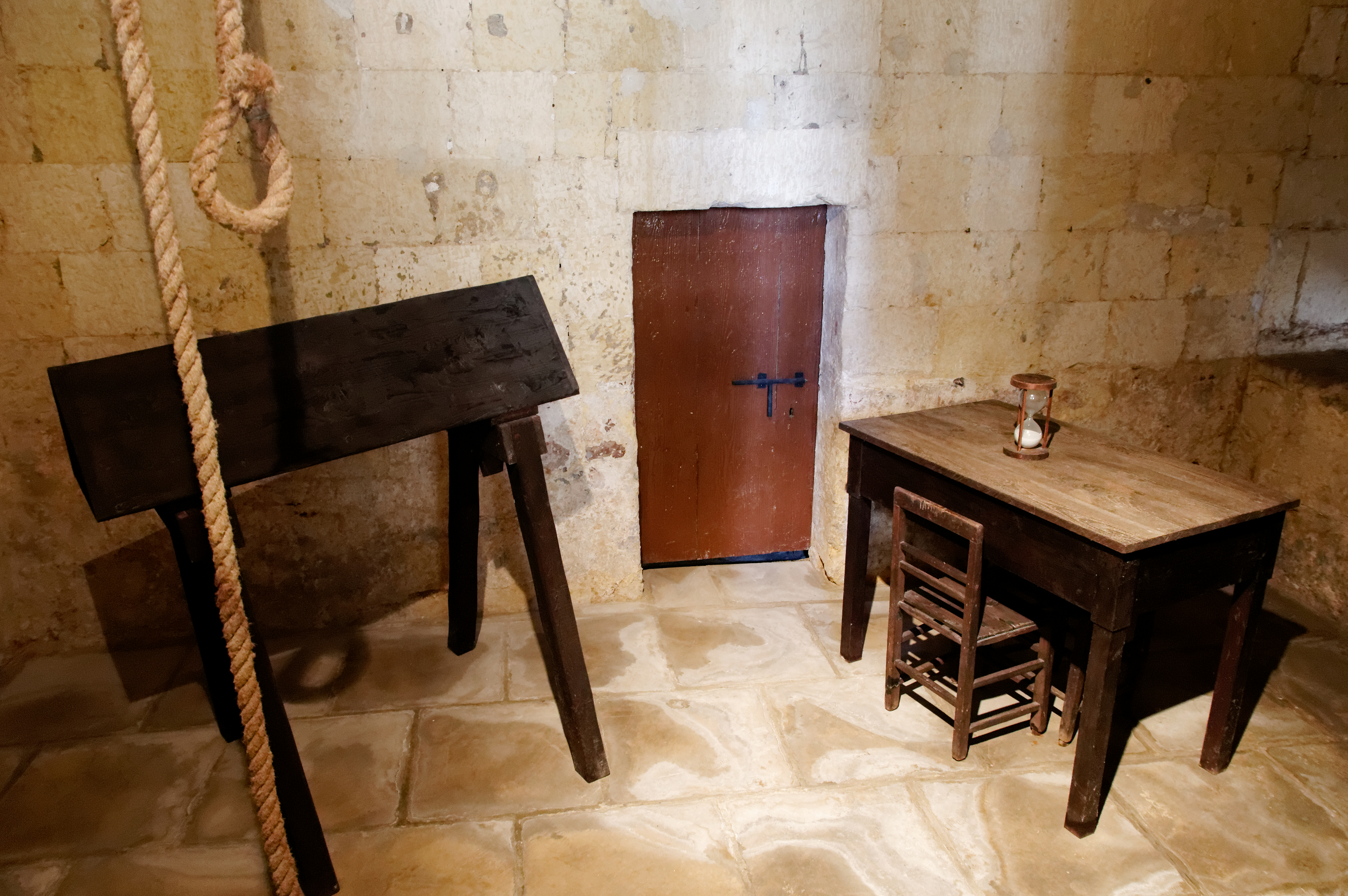
Cavalletto at the Inquisitor's Palace, in Birgu

A wooden horse, caballete (as called in most Spanish-speaking territories and continents), Spanish donkey or cavalletto squarciapalle is a torture device, of which there exist two variations; both inflict pain by using the subject's own weight by keeping the legs open, tied with ropes from above, while lowering down the subject. The French called this instrument the chevalet, from the French diminutive of cheval, horse.

== Torture device ==
The first variation of the wooden horse is a triangular device with one end of the triangle pointing upward, mounted on a sawhorse-like support. The victim is made to straddle the triangular "horse". Weights or additional restraints were often added to keep the victim from falling off. A punishment similar to this called "riding the rail" was used during the American colonial period and later. The victim was often carried through town in this predicament, often in conjunction with the punishment of tarring and feathering. The groin could be injured and the victim left unable to walk without pain.

The Jesuit Relations say that in 1646, a man "was sentenced to make reparation, by the Civil authority, and to mount the Chevalet," and "a public blasphemer, was put on the Chevalet. He acknowledged his fault, saying that he had well deserved punishment, and came of his own accord to confess, that evening or the next day," and that another man "acted at the fort as such a glutton, that he was put on the Chevalet, on which he was ruptured."

The device was used during the American Civil War by Union guards against their Confederate prisoners:

There were some of our poor boys, for little infraction of the prison rules, riding what they called Morgan's mule every day. That was one mule that did the worst standing stock still. He was built after the pattern of those used by carpenters. He was about fifteen feet high; the legs were nailed to the scantling so one of the sharp edges was turned up, which made it very painful and uncomfortable to the poor fellow especially when he had to be ridden bareback, sometimes with heavy weights fastened to his feet and sometimes with a large beef bone in each hand. This performance was carried on under the eyes of a guard with a loaded gun, and was kept up for several days; each ride lasting two hours each day unless the fellow fainted and fell off from pain and exhaustion. Very few were able to walk after this hellish Yankee torture but had to be supported to their barracks.

— Milton Asbury Ryan, Co. G, 8th MS Regiment

The History Channel documentary Eighty Acres of Hell describes a torture device, "the mule", on which Confederate prisoners were forced to ride until they passed out; many were crippled for life.

The device was also used by Union officers as an entertaining way to discipline troops, and on freedmen after the Civil War.

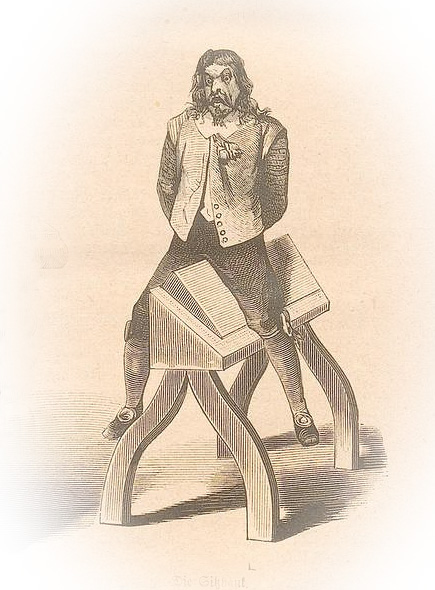
An illustration of a torture horse of the Spanish donkey variety.

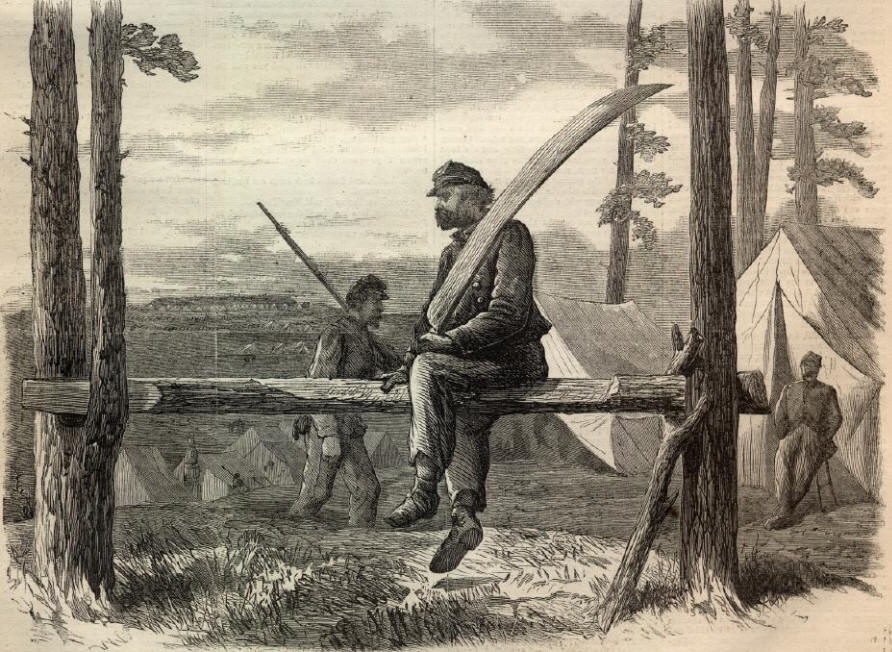
Riding a rail, sketched by Andrew W. Warren in November 1864
