= Robert Titus (colonist) =

English colonist in the United States

- Born: Robert Titus c. 1600; St. Katherine's, London, England
- Died: 1672; Huntington, Long Island, USA
- Spouse: Hannah
- Children: John, Edmond, Samuel, Susanna, Abiel and Content

Robert Titus (c. 1600 – 1672) was the first Titus immigrant from England to America and is the progenitor of many of the Tituses in America today. After living 19 years in Brookline, Weymouth and Rehoboth, Titus was warned out of Massachusetts in 1654; and moved to Long Island.

== Emigration ==
Robert Titus sailed from St. Katherine's, London, aboard the ship Hopewell on April 3, 1635, with his wife, Hannah, and two sons. The family arrived in the Massachusetts Bay Colony port of Boston; and Robert was granted land in Muddy River, the present town of Brookline, Massachusetts. They lived in Brookline for two or three years and then moved to the town of Weymouth. Robert's land in Weymouth is described in the town records and is printed on page 274 of The History of Weymouth:

Six acres in the plaine 3 of them first giuen to George Allin 3 to Arthure Warren bounded on the East with a highwaie on the west and north with high waies on the south with the land of John Ozborne

ffower acres on the other side first giuen to James Ludden the greate swampe being on the west and south of it

One acre of ffresh marsh at his dore beinge at the north end of the greate swampe.

== Banishment ==
Coat of Arms of Robert Titus

Robert and his family belonged to the Church of Weymouth where Rev. Samuel Newman was pastor from 1639 to 1643. In 1643 Rev. Newman and most of his parishioners, including the Titus family, moved out of Weymouth and settled to the southwest and ultimately founded Rehoboth, Massachusetts.

Despite Robert's importance in Rehoboth community, he began to have problems with his fellow townsmen. On June 6, 1654, he was told to move his family out of the Plymouth Colony for allowing Abner Ordway and family, "persons of evil fame", to live in his home. The practice of banishing a family from the colony was known as a "Warning Out Notice;" and the warning out of the Titus family was the first recorded in the Plymouth Colony Record (22. p. 52)

Robert took his family to Long Island in the summer of 1654 where his son Edmond had moved about 1650 to later become a Quaker. They settled near Oyster Bay in Huntington, Long Island. Robert's oldest son John was a land holder in Rehoboth in 1654 and remained there when his father moved to Long Island.

== Death ==
Robert Titus died in 1672 in Huntington, LI. His wife Hannah's will was then drawn up, and read upon her death in 1679. The following will of Hannah Titus made at Huntington, L.I. in 1672 makes no mention of her husband. The original is on file in the office of the Clerk of the Court of Appeals, in Albany, N.Y.:

May 14th 1672. The last Will and testament of Hanna Titus, being in prefit memory, I bequeth my sowl to God that gave it, and my body to the earth, and for my Estate I depose of it as followeth:- Imprimis I give to my sonn Content my house and all my land; and out of the forsaid house and Lands I give to my sonn Johnn tenn poundes, which my son Content is to pay him. And also I give to my son John my mare, and to my son Edmond I give a horse, and to my son Samuel a browne cow, and a yearlen stear, and I give to my son Samuel's wife my warming pan, and to my son Abialle's wife my smothing yron and to my son Contente's wife my Skimar, and for what remnantes of sarg and cloth I have, my will is, that it be equally divided among all my children, and to my dafter Susana I give my sarg hoode, and for all the rest of my estate within the house and without it, I give to my sun Abiall and Content to be equally divided between them two, and to this my will I set my hand in the presence of

Richard Williames the H marke of Thomas Skidmore Hana Titus

Richard Williames being one of the witnesses to this will have given his oath to the truth of it before me Jonas Wood this 28 of May '79

Thomas Skidmore being a witness to ye wth in written will doth declare in ye presence of God to ye truth of it before me Issac Platt, Constable

In the absence of ye Justice. Huntington, December ye 17th 1679.
