= Quemadero =

Place of execution in Seville, Spain

The Quemadero (Quemadero de Tablada) was a place of execution built by the first inquisitors at Seville in 1481; it was decorated with four large statues representing prophets. The Jewish architect was one of the first to fall victim to the Inquisition. The Quemadero was destroyed in 1809. The material was used for fortifications during the French invasion of Andalusia.
