= Drunkard's cloak =

Type of pillory, a barrel worn as clothes

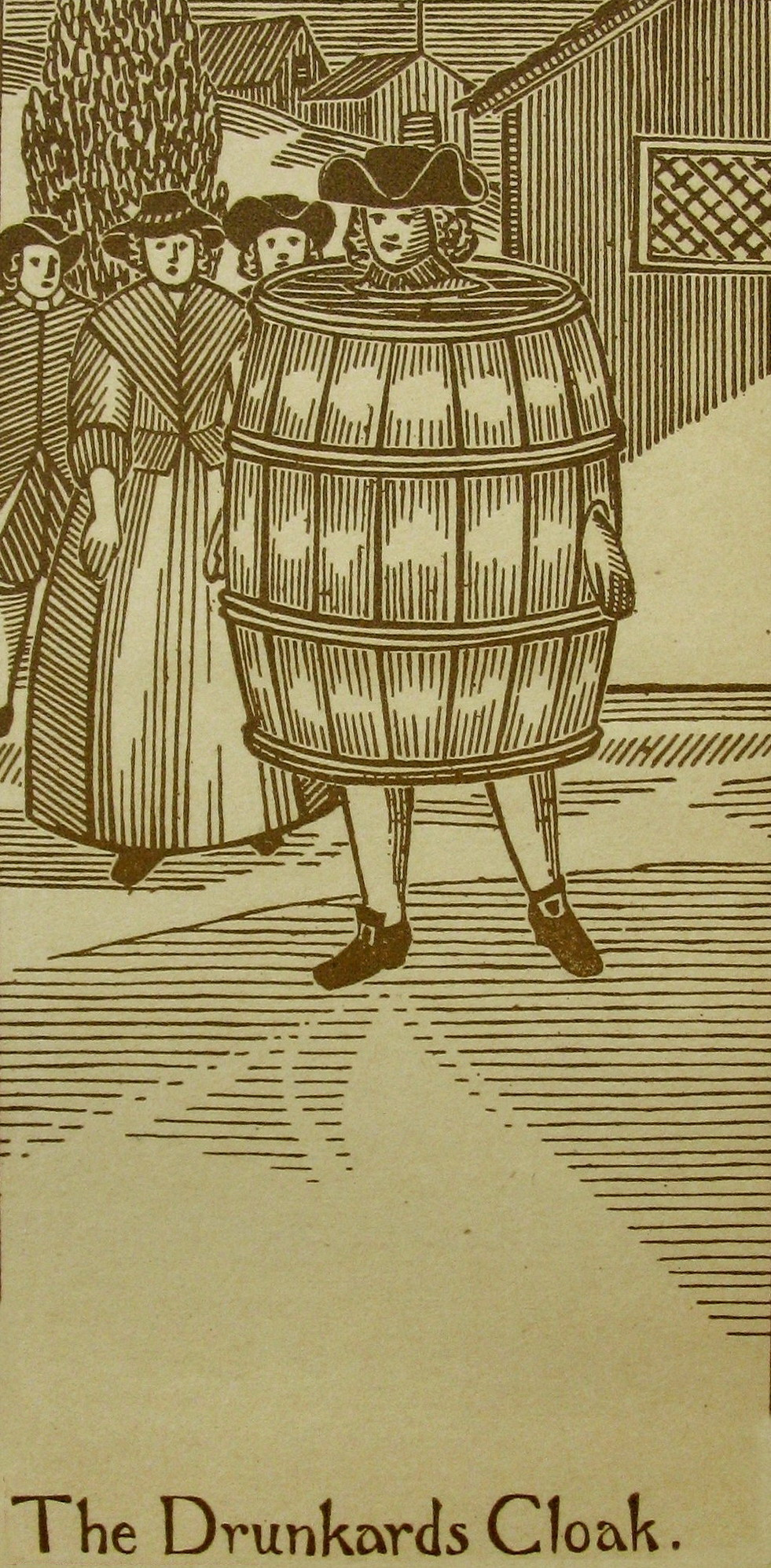
18th-century depiction of the "drunkard's cloak"

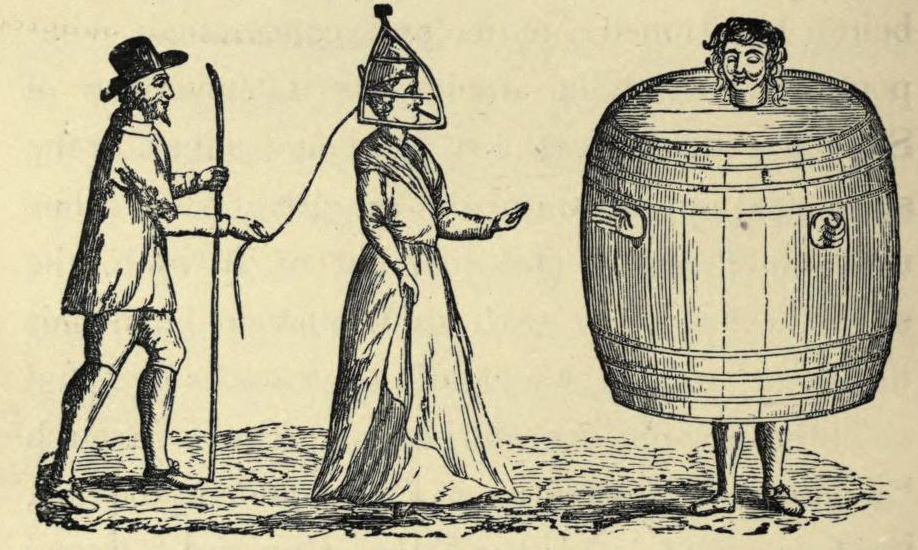
Illustration of brank and drunkard's cloak

A drunkard's cloak was a type of pillory used in various jurisdictions to punish miscreants.

== Description ==
The drunkard's cloak was actually a barrel, into the top of which a hole was made for the head to pass through. Two smaller holes in the sides were cut for the arms. Once suitably attired, the miscreant was paraded through the town, effectively pilloried.

== Offences ==
Drunkenness was first made a civil offence in England by the Ale Houses Act 1551, or "An Act for Keepers of Ale-houses to be bound by Recognisances". (Note: Until 1552, English ale-house keepers could run their business without a licence. The new act forced ale-house keepers to obtain a licence, which was granted by two justices at a Sessions Court. Potential landlords who failed to comply with the new legislation could be sent to prison. The Act also gave justices discretionary powers to close unlicensed ale-houses.) According to Ian Hornsey, the drunkard's cloak, sometimes called the "Newcastle cloak", became a common method of punishing recidivists, especially during the Commonwealth of England. From 1655 Oliver Cromwell suppressed many of England's alehouses, particularly in Royalist areas, and the authorities made regular use of the cloak.

== Accounts ==
An early description of the drunkard's cloak appears in Ralph Gardiner's England's Grievance Discovered, first published in 1655. A John Willis claimed to have travelled to Newcastle and seen

men drove up and down the streets, with a great tub, or barrel, opened in the sides, with a hole in one end, to put through their heads, and to cover their shoulders and bodies, down to the small of their legs, and then close the same, called the new fashioned cloak, and so make them march to the view of all beholders; and this is their punishment for drunkards, or the like.

Gardiner's account was reproduced in 1789 in John Brand's History of Newcastle-on-Tyne, accompanied by an early illustration of a drunkard's cloak. A similar device was used in Holland; William Brereton noted its use in Delft in 1634, as did Samuel Pepys at The Hague in 1660. One author also recorded its existence in 1784 in Denmark, where it was called the "Spanish Mantle". These occurrences, along with the observations of one 19th-century historian, who noted that no mention of the punishment was made in any local documentation, including the Newcastle Corporation accounts, prompted William Andrews to suppose in 1899 that the Drunkard's Cloak was a custom imported from the Continent, and that its use in England was confined to Newcastle.

Further afield, instances of its use are found in the US; a paper described in 1862 how a "wretched delinquent was gratuitously framed in oak, his head being thrust through a hole cut in one end of a barrel, the other end of which had been removed, and the poor fellow loafed about in the most disconsolate manner, looking for all the world like a half-hatched chicken."

== See also ==
- Bankruptcy barrel
- Schandmantel

== General and cited references ==
- Andrews, William (1899). Bygone Punishments. William Andrews & Co.
- Earle, Alice Morse (1896). Curious Punishments of Bygone Days. H. S. Stone & Company – via Internet Archive.
- Gardiner, Ralph (1796) [First published 1655]. England's Grievance Discovered, in Relation to the Coal Trade. R. Ibbitson and P. Stent.
- Hornsey, Ian Spencer (2003). A History of Beer and Brewing. Royal Society of Chemistry. ISBN 0-85404-630-5.
- Hutchinson, William; Randal, Thomas (1778). A View of Northumberland. W. Charnley and Messrs Vesey and Whitfield.
