= Goat's tongue =

Possible medieval torture method

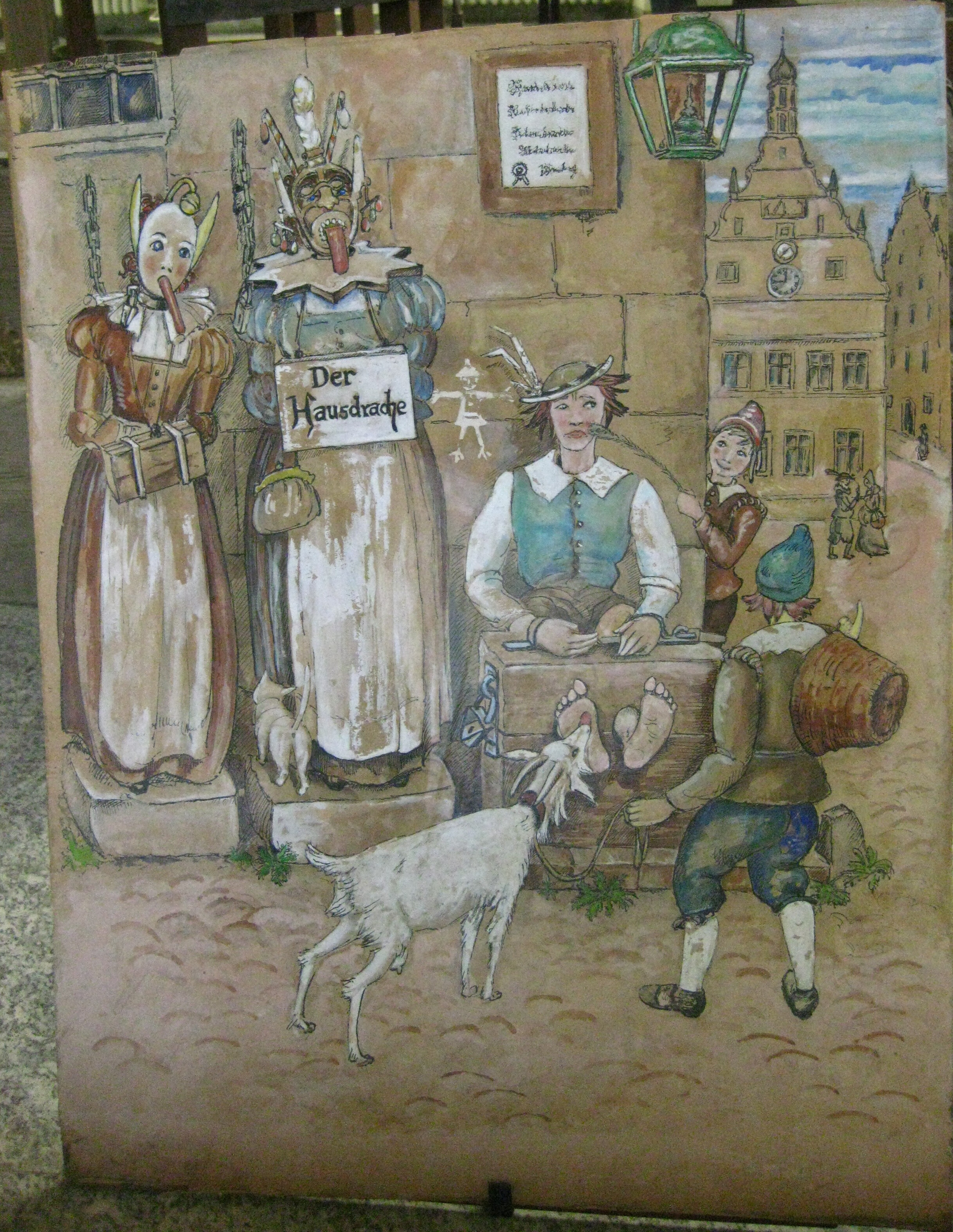
An artistic depiction of a goat licking a criminal's foot as a form of torture, from a torture museum in Germany.

The goat's tongue is a method of torture which was invented and may have been practiced in medieval Europe, whereby a goat would lick the feet of a victim whose soles were previously drenched in saltwater, supposedly causing the peeling of skin. However, it remains unclear if this method was ever used in practice as it is only described in the 1502 Tractatus de indiciis et tortura by the Italian jurist and monk Franciscus Brunus de San Severino – a treatise that actually cautioned against torture in general – and while it seems clear that Franciscus Brunus had not made up this practice, the issue is left open whether the inclusion in the treatise is based on hearsay, (reliable) eye-witness accounts, or personal experience. Italian lawyer Ippolito De'Marsili included the goat's tongue in a list of possible torture techniques which was published in 1537. The method was mentioned in 1115 by Guibert de Nogent in his Monodies, with translator Jay Rubenstein annotating that the torture developed in the Roman Empire.
