= Riding a rail =

Punishment mostly prevalent in the United States

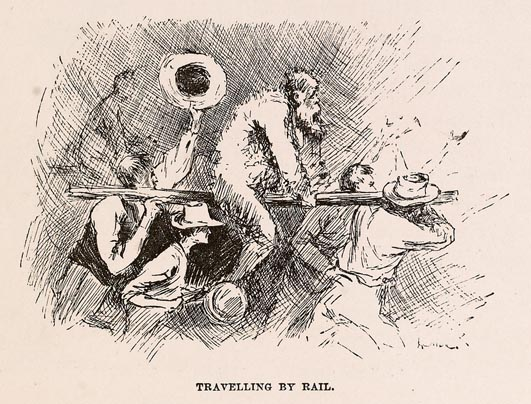
One of the two con men being paraded on a rail in Adventures of Huckleberry Finn

Riding the rail (also called being "run out of town on a rail") was a punishment most prevalent in the United States in the 18th and 19th centuries in which an offender was made to straddle a fence rail held on the shoulders of two or more bearers. The subject was then paraded around town or taken to the city limits and dumped by the roadside.

Being ridden on a rail was typically a form of extrajudicial punishment administered by a mob, sometimes in connection with tarring and feathering, intended to show community displeasure with the offender so the offender either conformed behavior to the mob's demands or left the community.

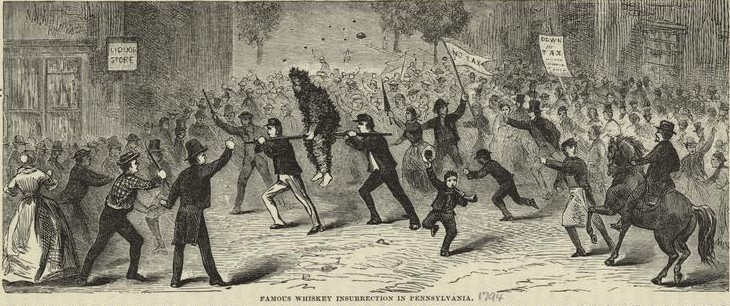
"Famous whiskey insurrection in Pennsylvania", an illustration from Our first century: being a popular descriptive portraiture of the one hundred great and memorable events of perpetual interest in the history of our country by R. M. Devens (Springfield, MA., 1882).

A story attributed to Abraham Lincoln has him quoting a victim of being ridden out of town on a rail as having said, "If it weren't for the honor of the thing, I'd just as soon it happened to someone else."

== In popular culture ==
In the film O Brother, Where Art Thou?, Homer Stokes denounces the Soggy Bottom Boys as hostile to the social order and accuses them of associating with African Americans. Stokes then reveals that he is a member of the Ku Klux Klan, which further angers the crowd, and several men carry him out of the building on a rail.

In Mark Twain's book Adventures of Huckleberry Finn (1884), two traveling swindlers known as "The King" and "The Duke" are finally caught in the act and are ridden out of town "astraddle a rail" after tarring and feathering.

== See also ==
- Charivari in North America
- Lynching
- Mobbing
- Vigilantism
- Warning out of town
- Wooden horse (device)
