= Whirligig (torture) =

Torture method

A whirligig is a punitive or torture contraption comprising a suspended cage-like device. The victim would be placed in the cage, which was spun violently in order to cause severe nausea.

== Device ==
The device used for a whirligig is a six-foot-high cylindrical cage connected to pivots at top and bottom.

== Punishment ==
This was used as a military punishment, as by the British Army. For example, in Tangiers, the whirligig was reportedly used on women, by whom it was more feared than the pillory, stocks and wooden horse.
