= Iron chair =

Torture device

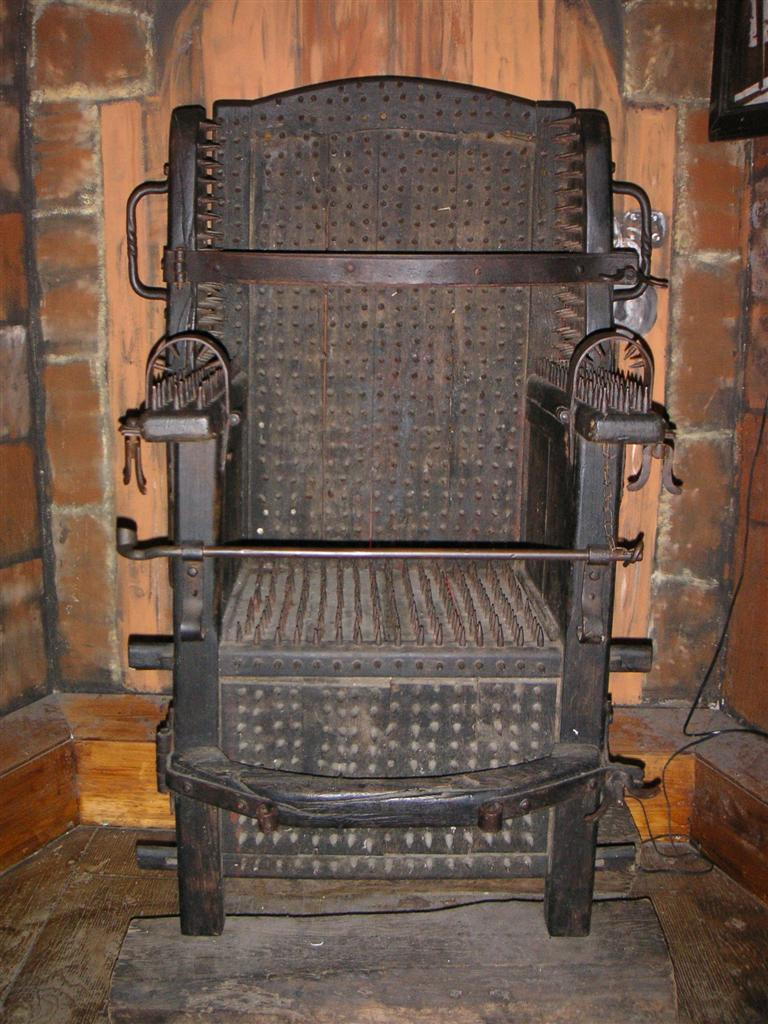
Iron chair

An iron chair is a torture device that has several different variations depending on its origin and use throughout history. It is also known as the Chinese torture chair or the torture chair. In all cases, the victim was seated on several strips or plates of brass and placed over an open flame and slowly roasted alive. In other variations, the victim was tied to an iron armchair and then slowly pushed nearer and nearer to a blazing fire." Other versions of the chair had the addition of small sharp spikes which lined the back, seat, armrests and leg rests. The number of spikes ranged from 500 to 1,500.

== Origin ==
The iron chair originated from Europe's Middle Ages, though it was used around the world in different variations as well.

== Lead ==
The iron chair was a torture device that was added to dungeons in the Middle Ages. It experienced its prime in popularity in Europe. The iron chair has many different variations depending on its location but they consisted of 500-1500 spikes covering the whole chair with a hole on the seat for fire and coal to be placed under.

The iron chair was used as punishment. Crimes that were punishable by the iron chair included adultery, witchcraft, murder, etc. The instrument was used until the late 1800s in Europe.

== Variations ==
Another variation of the iron chair was called the Chinese torture chair because it was a very common torture technique in China. Though the Chinese torture chair is slightly different, it was used in the same psychological way as Europe's version. The Chinese torture chair was used from 1701 to the 1900s in China and was "...made from wood with 12 steel blades in the arm, back and foot rests and seat" (Science Museum, London).

== Effects ==
This device was used on convicted people or suspects because it instilled fear in a person. It was used to extract confessions from people by watching another get tortured. If that failed, the person had to suffer from it as well. The iron chair "...lies primarily in the psychological fear caused on the victim" (Medievality). The iron chair was especially unique because it relied on the psychological effects rather than physical, unlike many other torture instruments. Physically, this instrument punctures the skin while the person is tied down tightly onto the chair. If they do not cooperate, the person gets tied down tighter, digging the spikes deeper into their flesh. The large hole in the bottom of the seat was made to put coal and fire underneath in order to burn the victim's lower body parts and slowly roast them alive. While this torture technique did not necessarily cause death itself, its victims often developed fatal infections after release.
