= Jiagun =

Chinese torture method

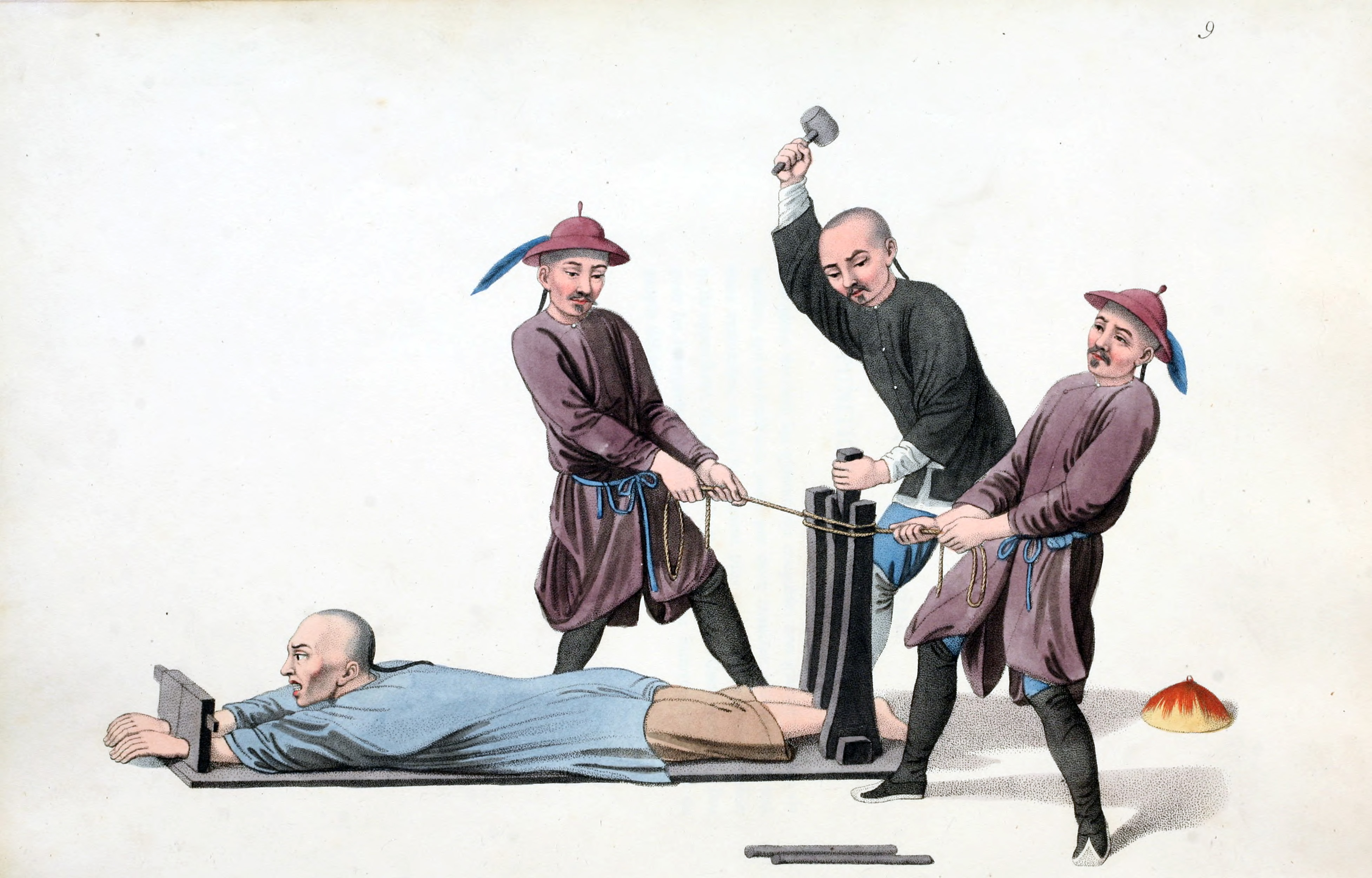
- Jiagun, Mason and Dadley (1801, "The Rack" [sic])
- Traditional Chinese: 夾棍
- Simplified Chinese: 夹棍
- Literal meaning: squeezing sticks
Transcriptions
Standard Mandarin
- Hanyu Pinyin: jiāgùn
- Wade–Giles: chia^{1}kun^{4}
Yue: Cantonese
- Jyutping: gaap^{3}gwan^{3}
Middle Chinese
- Middle Chinese: kˠɛp̚ɦuənX
Old Chinese
- Zhengzhang: *kreːbkuːns

The jiagun ( 夾棍) ankle crusher was a Chinese instrument of torture consisting of three wooden boards approximately a yard in length that were connected with cords, which when placed around a suspect's feet and gradually pulled, caused agonizing pain in order to force a confession. Under traditional Chinese law, a person could not be convicted of a crime unless they confessed. The jiagun was a legal and non-lethal method for torturing men to confess, and for women there was the similar and less painful zanzhi finger crusher with small sticks and cords.

== Names ==
The word jiāgùn is written with two Chinese characters. The first jiā (夾) means "press from two sides; pinch; press; squeeze" and the second character gùn (棍) means "rod; stick; villain". Jiābàng (夾棒]), with bàng (棒, "stick; club; cudgel"), is a synonym of jiāgùn.

In terms of Chinese character classification, the former logograph is a compound ideograph combining three people, a 大 "big person with outstretched arms" between two smaller 人 "people", and the latter is a phono-semantic character; with the semantically-significant radical "wood" radical (木) and a phonetic element of kūn (昆 "elder brother"). Compare jiā (梜 "chopsticks") with the same "wood" radical and jiā (夾) phonetic, denoting "pick up with pincers or chopsticks".

== Western accounts of Chinese torture ==
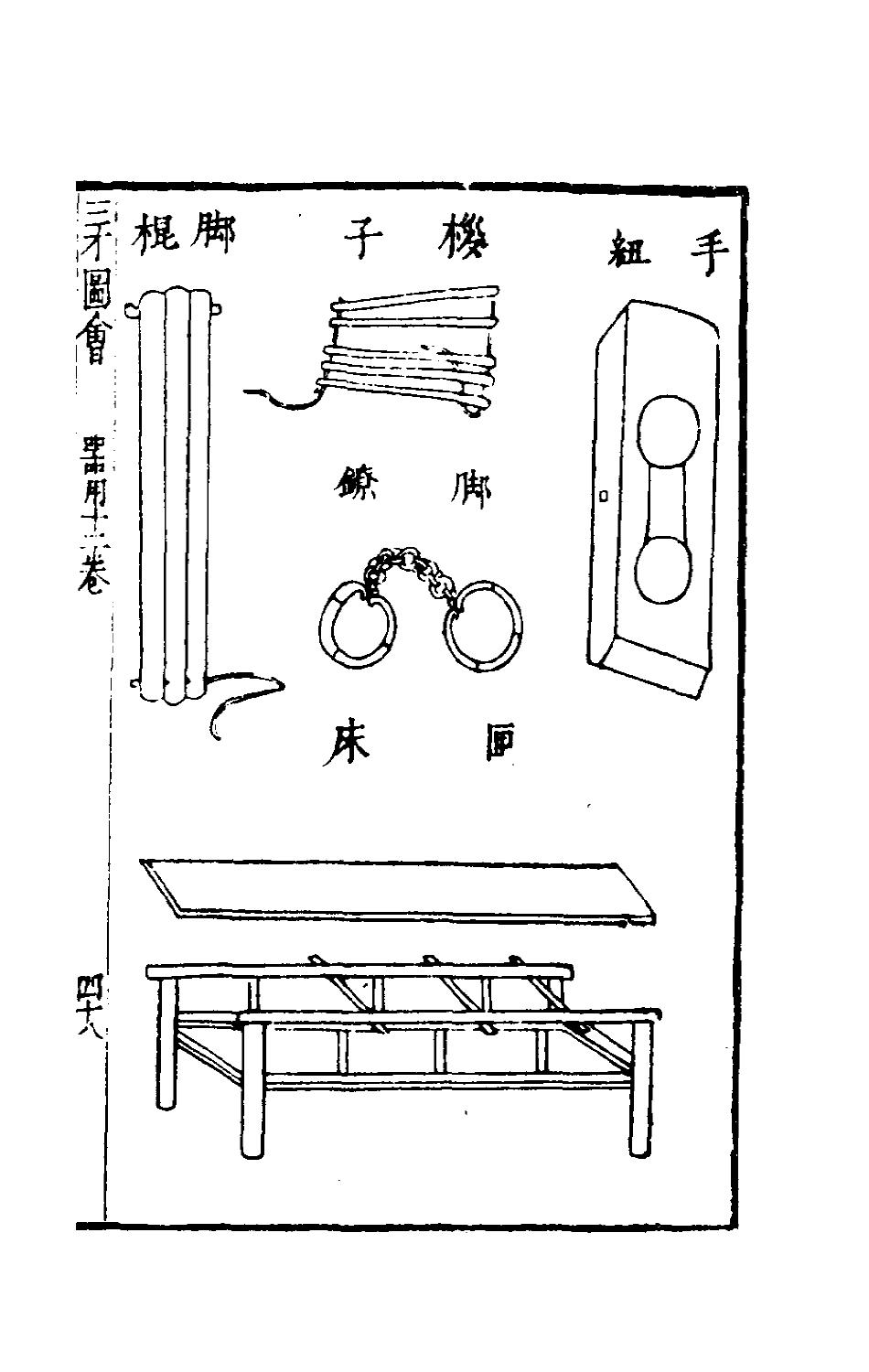
Ancient Chinese torture devices from the 1609 Sancai Tuhui, Clockwise from upper left: ankle press (jiaogun 腳棍), finger press (zanzi 桚子), wooden manacles (shoujiu 手紐), fetters (jiaoliao 腳鐐), and box-bed (xiachuang 匣床)

Several early European-language descriptions of China describe jiaogun (romanized as kiaquen) and zanzhi (erroneously teanzu) ankle and finger crushers, and were repeated in numerous later books up to the present day.

The Spanish Augustinian Catholic bishop and author Juan González de Mendoza (1545–1618) published one of the earliest Western histories of China: the 1585 Spanish-language Historia de las cosas más notables, ritos y costumbres del gran reyno de la China (History of the Great and Mighty Kingdom of China and the Situation Thereof), which describes the zanzhi and jiagun without noting their Chinese names. In the wi English translation,

Cruel torments. These judges do use two manner of torments to make them to confess the truth, when by fair means they can not, or by policy, the which first is procured with great care and diligence: the one is on their feet, and the other on their hands, and is so terrible that it cannot be suffered, but of force they do confess that which the judge doth pretend to know; yet do they execute none of them except first they have good information, or at the least, semiplena, or else so many inductions that it is a sufficient information for the same. The torments on the hands is given with two sticks as big as two fingers, and a span long, turned round and full of holes in all places, wherein are put cords to pull in and out their fingers of both their hands are put into the cords, and little and little they do pinch them, till in the end they do break them at the joints, with an incredible pain unto them that do suffer it, and it causes them to give great shrieks and groans that will move any man to compassion. And if it so come to passe that by this cruel torment they will not confess, and that the judge do understand by witness and by indiction that he is faulty and culpable, then doth he command to give him the torment of the feet, which is a great deal more cruel than that of the hands, and is in this sort: they take two pieces of wood, four square of four spans long and one span broad, and are joined together with a gume, and holes bored thorough, and put thorough them cords, and in the midst of these bords they do put the whole foot, and strain the cords, and with a mallet they do strike upon the cords, wherewith they do break all the bones, and cause them to suffer more pain and grief than with the torment of the hands. At the executing of these torments the supreme judges are always present, the which seldom times doth happen: for that such as be culpable will sooner confess than suffer those torments, desiring rather to die some other death that is not so cruel, than to suffer the pains of this torment.

— de Mendoza 1585, tr. Parke 1588, 143; adapted to modern typography

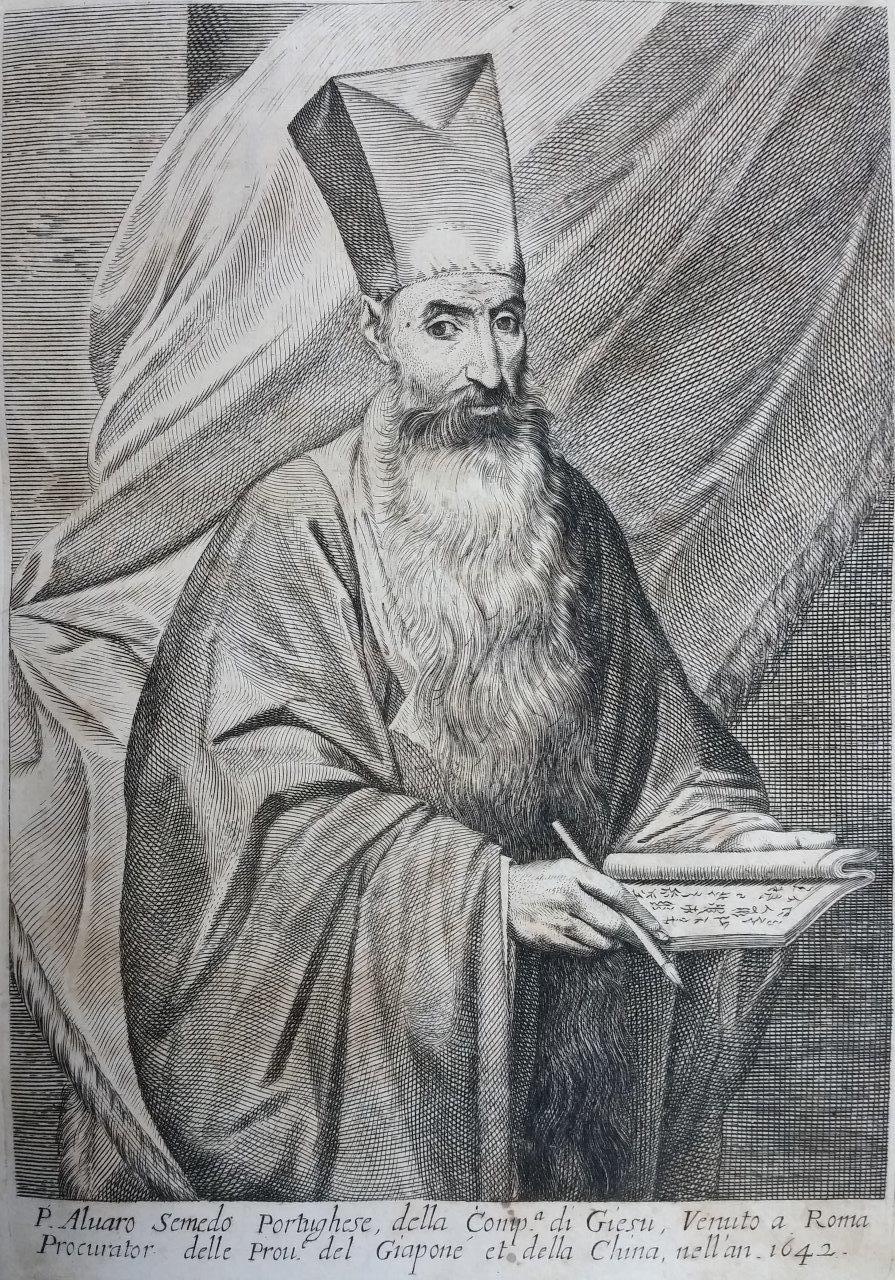
1642 depiction of Álvaro de Semedo

Álvaro Semedo (1585–1658), the Portuguese Jesuit priest and missionary in China, wrote a classic 1642 Spanish-language Imperio de la China... account of China that was subsequently translated into several European languages. It mentions two torture devices for the hands and feet, yet only describes the jiagun (romanized as Kiaquen) without mentioning the zanzhi (Semedo 1642, 187). Semedo had personal knowledge of the Chinese judicial system, he was "imprisoned for a year during the 1616 anti-Christian campaign and spent thirty days in a cage while being transported from Nanjing to Canton" (Brook 2008, 157). The front cover identifies the Portuguese historian Manuel de Faria e Sousa (1590–1649) as the publisher, but Faria e Sousa later claimed authorship (Pina 2018, 36–37).

Giovanni Battista Giattini's 1643 Italian translation of Semedo repeated the original description of the Kia quen ankle crusher and added one for the so-called Tean zu finger crusher (Semedo 1643, 181). Written and published in only one year, this text was flawed by typographical and printing errors, "some of which were quite significant" (Pina 2018, 38). Thomas Henshaw's 1655 English translation of Semedo capitalizes the second syllables as Kia Quen and Tean Zu (Semedo 1655, 143). The 1667 French translation by Louis Coulon hyphenates Kia-quen and Tean-zu (Semedo 1667, 209). The context in Henshaw's translation says:

The Rack is used also in certain necessary cases. I do not know that they have above two kindes of it. That of the feet, and that of the hands. For the feet they use an instrument called Kia Quen, it consisteth of three pieces of wood put in one Traverse, that in the middle is fixe, the other two are moveable, between these their feet are put, where they are squeezed and press, till the heele-bone run into the foot: for the hands they use also certain small pieces of wood between their fingers, they call them Tean Zu then they straiten them very hard, and seale them round about with paper and so they have them for some space of time.

— Semedo 1655, 143; adapted to modern typography

George Staunton's 1810 Fundamental Laws of China was the first foreign translation of the 1740–1805 Great Qing Legal Code, and gives precise instructions for constructing legal torture devices, including the jiagun and zanzhi. Note: the approximate equivalents for the below Chinese units of length, 1 "Chinese foot" or chi (che) is 33 cm and 1 "Chinese inch" cun (tsun) is 33 mm.

Instruments of torture of the following dimensions, may be used upon an investigation of a charge of robbery and homicide: The instruments for compressing the ankle-bones, shall consist of a middle piece, 3 Che 4 Tsun long, and two side-pieces, 3 Che each in length; the upper end of each piece shall be circular, and 1 Tsun 8 decimals in diameter; the lower ends shall be cut square, and, 2 Tsun in thickness: At a distance of 6 Tsun from the lower ends, four hollows, or sockets, shall be excavated, 1 Tsun 6 decimals in diameter, and 7 decimals of a Tsun in depth each; one, on each side the middle-piece, and one in each of the other pieces, to correspond. The lower ends being fixed and immovable, and the ankles of the criminal under examination being lodged between the sockets, a painful compression is effected by forcibly drawing together the upper ends.

The instrument of torture for compressing the fingers, shall consist of 5 small round sticks, 7 Tsun in length, and 45/100 of a Tsun in diameter each: the application of this instrument is nearly similar to that of the former. In those cases wherein the use of torture is allowed, the offender, whenever he contumaciously refuses to confess the truth, shall forthwith be put to the question by torture; and it shall be lawful to repeat the operation a second time, if the criminal still refuses to make a confession. If the first application fails to elicit the truth, it is lawful to repeat the operation a second time, if the criminal still refuses to make a confession.

— 1810, 488–489

George Ryley Scott's popular 1940 The History of Torture Throughout the Ages quotes Semedo (1655) and Staunton (1810), adding that the kia quen and tean zu were not to be used for "criminals under fifteen years of age or over seventy; to the diseased or the crippled". (Scott 1940, 103). This odd teanzu spelling exemplifies what linguists and lexicographers call a ghost word, an original typographic error that is repeatedly copied for generations.

== Translations ==
Translating jiagun (夾棍) into English is problematic owing to the lack of an equivalent word. Chinese-dictionaries and books generally describe jiagun:

- "an instrument of torture for compressing the ancles [sic]" (Morrison 1815, 588)
- "a kind of torture, like the thumb-screws" (Medhurst 1847, 148)
- "a wooden instrument for the squeezing the ankles to extort evidence" (Giles 1912, 136)
- "torture instruments used for squeezing in order to elicit evidence" (Mathews 1931, 82)
- "formerly, an instrument of torture, a rack" (Lin 1972)
- "leg-rack applied to criminals" (DeFrancis 1996)
- "leg squeezer" (Theobold 2000)
- "ankle press", "ankle crusher" (Brook et al 2008, 43, 172)
- "leg vise (torture instrument)" (CEDICT 2022)

Morrison adds that since the jiagun is made of three pieces of wood, there is a Chinese saying, "三木之下何求不得 under the three-bar-torture, what evidence may you not procure?" Sānmù (三木) is a word meaning "fetters, shackles, and pillory".

The near-equivalent word brodequin is an obsolete English name for a buskin or "a high boot reaching about half-way up the calves of the legs" (OED), and was recorded as a type of boot torture. The prolific author George Ryley Scott, who repeated the tean zu ghost word, describes brodequin torture, which was used in early modern Scotland and France:

The prisoner was seated on a strong bench, and boards of suitable width and length were placed on the inside and outside of each leg, and tightly bound in position with strong rope, the two legs in their casing being fixed together. Wedges of wood or metal were then driven with a mallet between the centre boards. Four wedges were used in "ordinary torture", and eight wedges in what was termed "extraordinary torture". The effect was that the cords bit through the victim's flesh, causing excruciating pain. In many cases the bones were splintered or broken.

— Scott 1940, 1959, 185.

This description closely resembles the Chinese jiagun torture, except that the victim was sitting rather than lying down.

== See also ==
- Tablilla, a medieval Spanish torture device for crushing the fingers and toes
