= Great Ming Code =

Legal code of the Ming empire (1368–1644)

- Chinese: 大明律
Transcriptions
Standard Mandarin
- Hanyu Pinyin: Dà Míng lǜ
- Wade–Giles: Ta^{4} Ming^{2} lü^{4}
- IPA: [tâ mǐŋ lŷ]

The Great Ming Code was the legal code of the Ming dynasty, focused primarily on criminal law. It was created at the direction of the dynasty’s founder, the Hongwu Emperor Zhu Yuanzhang, in the late 14th century, as part of broader social and political reforms.

From 1397 to the fall of Ming in 1644, the Great Ming Code served as the principal governing law of China. Under the Qing dynasty it was replaced by the Great Qing Legal Code, which borrowed heavily from it. Portions of the Great Ming Code were adopted into the legal systems of Joseon dynasty Korea, Edo period Japan, and Lê dynasty Vietnam.

== Background ==
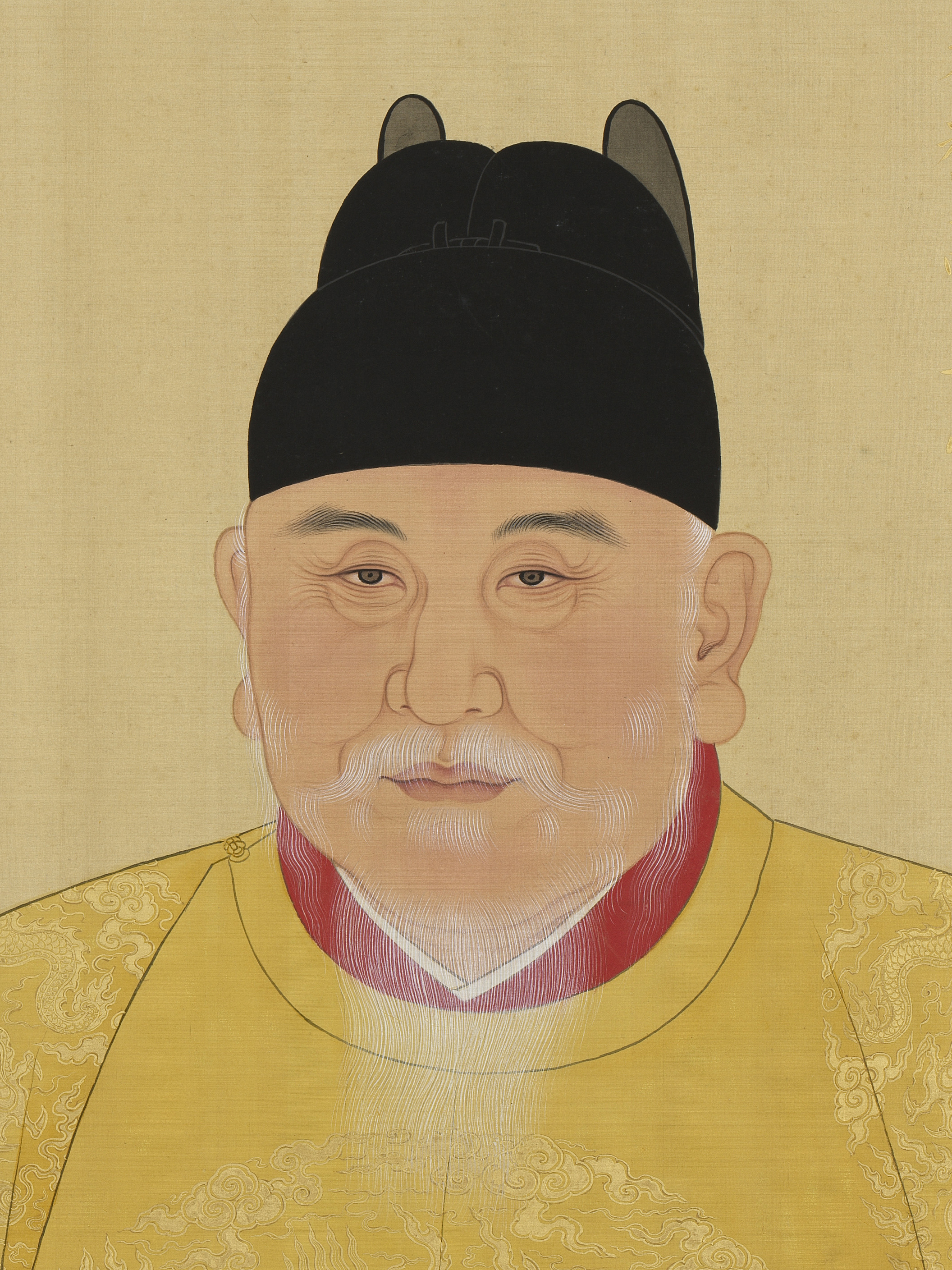
The Hongwu Emperor, under whose direction the Code was prepared.

The promulgation of the Great Ming Code in 1397 was the culmination of a series of efforts toward legal reform and codification spanning more than 30 years. No previous Chinese law code had gone through so many revisions in such a comparatively short time.

Work toward a new law code for what would become the Ming dynasty began in 1364, around the time that the future emperor captured Wuchang and began to call himself the Prince of Wu. In 1367 he ordered his Left Grand Councilor, Li Shanchang, to oversee and begin compiling a new code establishing principles of law and ritual with a focus on comparative lenience and simplicity. The resulting Ming Code was completed and promulgated at the end of 1367, consisting of 285 articles and based closely on the Tang Code. It was promulgated along with the Great Ming Commandment. No copies of this first Ming Code are extant.

On January 6, 1374, the emperor ordered Liu Weiqian, the Minister of Justice, to revise the Code, and this was completed in the spring of the same year. This new code, called for the first time the Great Ming Code, consisted of 606 articles (288 of which were taken from the first Ming Code). The text of the Great Ming Code of 1374 is also no longer extant.

In 1376, a new version of the Code was prepared at the emperor's direction in 1376 by Left Grand Councilor Hu Weiyong and Censor-in-Chief Wang Guangyang. Its text has also been lost, and it is unclear if there may have been minor revisions made at other times as well. In 1389, the Code was reorganized at the request of officials from the Ministry of Justice.

The final revision of the Code was officially promulgated in 1397, containing 460 articles, with only minor adjustments from the 1389 edition. The emperor ordered that the Code remain unchanged after 1397, and indeed the text of the Code remained unchanged throughout the dynasty, although emperors added their own ad hoc legislation and precedents to it. During the reign of the Wanli Emperor in 1585, 382 regulations or precedents were appended to the Code. In addition, scholarly commentaries circulated widely, providing interpretations of the Code's individual provisions.

== Content ==
The Great Ming Code consisted of 460 articles organized into 30 sections which were in turn organized into seven chapters. The Code was heavily concerned with public administration: of the 460 articles, 260 set forth the duties of imperial officials and corresponding punishments. For example, deceiving the throne could carry a penalty of strangulation or decapitation. Some provisions were also concerned with regulating private transactions, such as land sales.

The first chapter, "Laws on Punishments and General Principles", set out general rules of criminal law and punishment, including the Five Punishments. The remaining six chapters were divided into laws on personnel, rituals, revenue, military affairs, penal affairs, and public works. This division corresponds to the organization of the Ming government into the Six Ministries, and differs considerably from both the Statutes of the Yuan Dynasty and the Tang Code.

In addition to the enumerated crimes, the Code contained a catchall prohibition on doing anything that "ought not to be done according to reason" in Article 410. Punishments for violating Article 410 were limited to no greater than 80 strokes with the heavy stick. Beyond that, the Code imposed strict limits on the use of legal analogy. An official seeking to apply a provision of the Code to a situation not expressly covered in the Code or the Great Ming Commandment was required to send the proposed punishment to the Ministry of Justice for review followed by imperial approval. Article 439 also provided that cases cannot be decided by analogy to case-specific imperial decrees, and an official doing so was subject to punishment.

Punishments were classified into the Five Punishments (beating with the light stick, beating with the heavy stick, imprisonment, exile, and death), each of which was divided into various degrees. Some of the punishments were already in place, while others were newly created under the Ming Code. In the imperial preface to the Code, the emperor explained that he had gone beyond the traditional Five Punishments in hopes of making the people afraid to violate the laws. The Eight Deliberations for mitigating the punishment of offenders of a certain rank were also defined in the first chapter of Code. Many punishments could be avoided by paying of a redemption fine, although some could not.

The Code defined the Ten Abominations as plotting rebellion, plotting "great sedition", plotting treason, contumacy, depravity, great irreverence, lack of filial piety, discord, unrighteousness, and incest. These were particularly severe crimes, which deprived those committing them of eligibility for amnesty, mitigation under the Eight Deliberations, and other legal privileges.

== Legacy ==
After the fall of the Ming Dynasty in 1644, the Qing Dynasty replaced the Great Ming Code with the Great Qing Legal Code. The Great Ming Code had been translated into Manchu by Wu Dahai in the early 17th century, and in the early years of Qing the Ming Code was kept largely in effect.

In the Joseon dynasty of Korea, the criminal provisions of the Great Ming Code were adapted for Korea by Taejo of Joseon. The version used was The Great Ming Code Directly Explicated, which contained the 1389 version of the Great Ming Code with added commentaries. A surviving exemplar is preserved as a state-designated heritage item in the National Palace Museum of Korea. Subsequent domestic enactments such as the Kyŏngguk taejŏn modified and expanded on certain provisions, but the Great Ming Code remained the primary penal law of Korea throughout the Joseon dynasty.

In Japan during the Edo period, research was carried out on the Great Ming Code in order to reform the legal system of the preceding Sengoku period, which had been influenced by the Bakuhan feudal system. Representative works in this field include Takase Tadaatsu's Interpretation and Translation of the Great Ming Code and Substatutes and Ogyu Hokkei's Ming Code: Kyōho Edition.

In Vietnam under the Lê dynasty, the Lê Code's 722 articles included 17 articles influenced by the Great Ming Code, although a larger number were influenced by the Tang Code.
