= Kaihuang Code =

581 legal code of Sui dynasty China

The Kaihuang Code (simplified Chinese: 开皇律; traditional Chinese: 開皇律; pinyin: Kāihuáng Lù) was a series of laws formulated in China at the time of Sui dynasty Emperor Wen of Sui (r. 581-604 CE). Containing twelve chapters with 500 provisions, the code reconfirmed the legal institutions of the Five Punishments, Eight Deliberations and Ten Abominations. The legal codes of later Chinese dynasties were based on the Kaihuang Code which is of strategic significance in the history of Traditional Chinese law.

== Formulation and enactment ==
In 581 CE, the first year of the Kaihuang (开皇/開皇) Era, Emperor Wen of Sui embarked on the reform of the old legal system. He ordered Gao Jiong and other senior ministers including Yang Su, Zheng Yi, Su Wei and Pei Zheng (裴政) along with 14 other individuals to make extensive use of the meritorious laws of Cao Wei as well as the Jin, Qi and Liang Dynasties. The legal drafting was based on historical severity of laws with compromises made when required. As a result, the “New Laws” were enacted in October 581.

Three years later in 583 CE, Emperor Wen received a memorial from the Inspector of the Ministry of Punishments from which he concluded “The number of court cases waiting to be judged has reached 10,000. I believe that our laws are still too strict and many of my old friends are falsely accused of crimes.” He once more ordered Su Wei and Niu Hong (牛弘) amongst others to immediately cancel a number of laws and simplify others with the intention of lightening punishments. Once complete, these new laws were duly proclaimed as the Kaihuang Code.

== Legal content ==
The Kaihuang Code contains a total of twelve chapters which in turn contain 500 statutes. Compared to the previous laws, 80 capital offences no longer appear along with 154 crimes for which banishment was formerly the punishment. More than one thousand offences for which imprisonment and caning were previously prescribed were also removed from the statute book. The primary sources of the changes were the published laws of the Northern Qi and Northern Zhou Dynasties, whilst in the table of contents there are entries for precedents (名例), restrictions on weaponry (卫禁), regulation of government offices (职制), marriage (户婚), barns and warehouses (厩库), dispatch of armies without authority (擅兴), theft and robbery (贼盗 also written as 盗贼), litigation (斗讼), fraudulent practices (诈伪), miscellaneous laws (杂律), capture of evaders (捕亡) and 12 chapters on judging cases (断狱). A number of legal procedures useful for the common people are also listed, for example miscarriages of justice could be individually appealed all the way to the Imperial court.

== Punishments ==
Due to the severe and harsh nature of the government that he witnessed during his time as a Northern Zhou official, Emperor Wen of Sui advocated clear and simple frugal laws that would please the population at large. After he became Emperor and during the drafting of the new laws, Emperor Wen abolished the previous dynasties punishments of whipping, beheading, tearing limb from limb with chariots and other cruel punishments such as the law requiring the death of all offspring of an offender (孥戮相坐之法). In their place a new set of laws were implemented: the death penalty, banishment, imprisonment, beating with a large stick and beating on the buttocks with a light bamboo cane. These formed the basis for the Five Punishments of later dynasties. At the time of Emperor Wen, the death penalty involved either strangulation or beheading whilst there were three degrees of banishment: 1,000 lǐ (310 miles, 1,500 lǐ (460 miles)) or 2,000 lǐ (620 miles). As an alternative to banishment, an offender might be sentenced to two, two and a half or three years of penal servitude. There were five grades of prison sentence with terms of one year, one and a half years, two years, two and a half years or three years. Beating with a large stick involved between 60 and 100 blows whilst between tens and fifty lashes were given with the bamboo cane.

== The Ten Abominations ==
The Ten Abominations laid out in the Kaihuang Code were based on The Ten Felonies (重罪十条) of the Northern Qi Dynasty. According to the new statutes, “on the completion of a prison sentence handed down for one of the Ten Abominations or premeditated murder, even if pardoned the offender’s name will be expunged from his ancestral records”. Over time, The Ten Abominations defined in the Kaihuang Code were adopted by later dynasties without modification.

== Privileges ==
The Kaihuang code offered certain privileges to criminal offenders who were members of the nobility and bureaucracy. Offenders falling within the scope of the Eight Deliberations or government officials of the seventh rank (七品) and above could have their sentences reduced except in the case of a crime classified as one of the Ten Abominations. Officials of the eighth rank (八品) and above were absolved of their crime on payment of a suitable sum of money to the Imperial treasury.

== Evaluation and assessment ==
Even though the Sui dynasty lasted only 37 years, the reformation of its legal institutions accomplished major results. The Kaihuang Code is regarded by historians as an paradigm of "good law" and the origin of Han Chinese law. Every legal institution of the Tang dynasty was a direct successor to those of the Sui dynasty with the Kaihuang Code a blueprint for its laws. Later, the Song, Ming and Qing dynasties all continued to use the code, making it a fundamental part of the development of the Chinese legal system. The Kaihuang Code also influenced the foundation and development of the legal systems of other South East Asian countries including Japan, Korea and Vietnam.
