= Chinese sorcery scares =

Series of moral panics in Imperial China

Chinese sorcery scares refer to a series of moral panics or mass hysteria events in Imperial China, occurring in 1768, 1810, 1876, and 1908. These scares were characterized by widespread fears of sorcery practices, particularly "soul-stealing," a form of alleged magic believed to cause illness or death. Accusations were often targeted at marginalized groups, including transient monks, beggars, and stonemasons, and resulted in interrogations, torture, and executions.

The 1768 scare, under the reign of the Qianlong Emperor, centered on rumors of sorcery involving the cutting of men's queues (a legally mandated braided hairstyle imposed by the Qing dynasty) to steal their souls. Another alleged practice involved attaching papers inscribed with names to concealed locations within the foundations or supports of construction projects, which was believed to enhance the sorcerer's or construction's strength at the cost of the persons named. These acts were perceived as threats to both individuals and imperial authority. The event led to violent mob actions, government investigations, and the scapegoating of religious figures, often Buddhist monks, suspected of supernatural abilities. Despite prolonged investigations, no evidence of an organized sorcery network or "master sorcerers" were ever substantiated, highlighting the role of torture and coerced confessions in perpetuating the panic.

Later scares, such as the 1876 incident in Nanjing, reflected similar themes of sorcery tied to construction, but incorporated evolving rumors, including claims of magically animated "paper men" cutting their hair braids. These fears spread across the Yangtze River Delta, sparking protective rituals and the sale of amulets.

The events of these scares are often compared to other instances of mass hysteria globally, including witch trials in early modern Europe and Ee ja nai ka celebrations in Bakumatsu-era Japan.

== Background ==
=== Soul-stealing ===
Beliefs regarding soul-stealing practices rested on the assumption that souls could be detached from a person's body and used to the benefit of a person with the knowledge and skills to steal a person's soul. Soul-stealing was believed to take two general forms: (1) by reciting spells over a physical object connected to the victim of soul-stealing or (2) by hammering a piece of paper with the victims name written on it into the foundations of a construction project. Soul-stealing by pinning paper on the foundation of construction projects refers to the belief that builders such as masons could use sorcery by writing people's names on paper slips and nailing the paper into the poles used to hold up something like a bridge. This practice then granted the builder greater strength by stealing the soul of whoever had been written onto the paper. Soul-stealing by queue-clipping involved the belief that sorcerers with the correct training were capable of stealing a man's soul by cutting off his queue (a Manchu-style braid) and reciting spells over the stolen clipping of hair. Similar to soul-stealing by pinning papers with names inscribed on them to the foundations of masonry projects, soul-stealing by queue-clipping would cause the victim of sorcery to fall ill or die.

The clipping of a man's queue was politically significant in 1768 because the queue hairstyle was the prescribed hairstyle of the ruling Manchu-elite during the Qing period. For a man to cut off his queue or refuse to tonsure his hair in the appropriate style was made illegal by the queue order and could be grounds for execution. To wear the queue was seen as a direct recognition of Qing imperial authority and Philip Kuhn speculates that rumors of queue-cutting sorcerers traversing the Chinese countryside could have been perceived as a threat to the emperor's authority. However, according to Kuhn, government officials never produced any written material that drew a direct line between soul-stealing by queue-clipping and the possible challenge to the Qianlong Emperor's political power. Government records from both the Qianlong Emperor and officials involved in the cases related to queue-clipping in 1768 do not provide any explicit mention to the potential political threat posed by the spread of queue-clipping. It is unclear exactly why the records are silent on this point, but Philip Kuhn argues that government officials' silence over the political implications of queue-cutting might have been due to the emperor's unwillingness to admit any potential threat to his legitimacy. By attributing the 1768 cases of queue-cutting to sorcery, Kuhn suggests that the Qing government could avoid admitting any threat to the emperor's authority.

According to Prasenjit Duara, Chinese religious life under the Qing dynasty was divided between an imperial-centered orthodoxy and a diverse landscape of popular religions. While the imperial orthodoxy and Confucianism was institutionalized as the dominant tradition, the division between imperial tradition and popular religion was not always clear cut and various forms of religious practice were permitted in varying degrees throughout the Qing period in China. However, unrest incited by religious groups and anxiety over unorthodox religions' threat to imperial authority did cause a number of purges aimed at religions or groups associated with certain religious traditions.

According to Philip Kuhn, the targeting of Buddhist monks during the panic incited by rumors of sorcery in 1768 was probably linked to common beliefs that attributed religious figures of Buddhism or Taoism with mystical powers capable of communicating with or manipulating the supernatural. At the time of the 1768 Sorcery Scare, judgement of certain crimes associated with illegal religious practice fell under the Qing Code, which meant that the offense was a capital crime and thus final judgement must be passed by the emperor. In these cases, failure to find the accused guilty meant that the accuser would face punishment instead.

== Events of 1768 ==
The first of the sorcery scares occurred during the reign of the Qianlong Emperor. Although the period between the late 17th and early 19th centuries has been called the High Qing era and celebrated as a period of prosperity, historians such as Pamela Crossley argue that wealth was not evenly distributed throughout China during this time. According to historian Philip Kuhn, this unequal distribution of wealth was largely determined by a region's amount of arable land, the frequency of natural disasters and a region's proximity to fertile river deltas. Philip Kuhn argues that because certain areas of China were relatively well off compared to other parts of the country, people migrated frequently in order to gain access to more prosperous regions despite the government's efforts to prevent internal migration.

=== January–May ===
Beginning in January 1768, rumors of soul-stealing sorcerers stoked public fear in and around the Yangze river delta. These rumors culminated in court cases and acts of violence against accused sorcerers. The violence targeted at accused sorcerers was carried out during courtroom torture sessions as well as a number of assaults and killings of individuals suspected of soul-stealing. The primary target of these soul-stealing accusations were transient beggar-monks who traveled between villages and were identified as strangers or outsiders because of their dress, behavior and/or accent.

==== Masons accused of soul-stealing in Hangzhou ====
In January 1768, a mason named Wu Dunming began work on a broken water-gate and bridge in Zhejiang, when Wu returned home to buy supplies for his workers he discovered that a man named Shen Shiliang had come to his home to ask if Wu would assist Shen in using sorcery against Shen's nephews. Shen had come to Wu because after the water-gate project had started in January, rumors had been circulating that the masons workings on the project were planning to use sorcery to assist them in their efforts to hammer in the poles necessary to rebuild the water gate and bridge. These rumors played upon a belief that masons had magical powers that allowed them to bring illness and death to those who had their names written on slips of paper and nailed into the poles used as foundations for bridges. This practice was termed "soul-stealing" because by taking down the name of someone on a slip of paper and hammering it into a masonry project, the mason was supposedly able to steal the person's soul and strengthen the mason's hammering strength. Despite these rumors, Wu refused to assist Shen and alerted local authorities about Shen's request that Wu commit acts of sorcery. As a result of Shen's actions, the local authorities punished him with twenty-five strokes.

In the spring of 1768, a man named Ji Zhaomei from Deching traveled to Hangzhou and became a beggar. On April 3, a group of locals assaulted Ji and accused him of sorcery and theft. He was then taken to the local headman and interrogated. Under interrogation, Ji admitted that he was a soul-stealer and had been given soul-stealing charms by the mason, Wu Dunming. After this accusation, Wu was brought into the local yamen (county office) for interrogation, but was released after Ji was unable to identify Wu in a lineup. After this, Ji revealed that he had made up the story of soul-stealing in order to ingratiate his interrogators.

Another mason named Guo was also involved in sorcery accusations when a local herbalist attempted to trick Guo into performing an act of sorcery so that the herbalist could gain favor with local authorities by successfully trapping a practitioner of soul-stealing. Guo was not tricked and instead brought the herbalist into the local county office and had him punished for attempting to falsely accuse Guo.

===== Legal proceedings =====
As local hysteria over the possibility of soul-stealing rose, local authorities decided to further investigate these three accusations of sorcery and eventually had the herbalist, Ji Zhaomei and Shen Shiliang put in cangues at the entrance to Hangzhou. In April 1768 after the events involving masons in Hangzhou, four traveling Buddhist monks from Hangzhou were accused of soul-stealing in the neighboring city of Xiaoshan as they were traveling through the city and begging. The first of the four monks who were accused were Zhucheng and Jingxin. Zhucheng and Jingxin were begging in villages near Xiaoshan when they entered into conversation with two children and asked for the two children's names. When the children's parents discovered that two strangers had asked for their children's names, the parents assumed that Zhucheng and Jingxin were sorcerers who were gathering people's names so that they could steal their souls. As more villagers gathered around the two monks and heard of the sorcery accusations, the two monks were bound, beaten and threatened with death. The other two Buddhist monks from Hangzhou, Chaofan and Zhengyi, were subjected to a search by a constable named Cai from Xiaoshan city. This constable found scissors and a queue tying cord in Zhucheng's baggage, which Zhengyi was carrying at the time. Villagers witnessing the search believed that the discovery of a queue tying cord and scissors were evidence of sorcery. Chaofan was released because he had the proper documentation to prove his status as a full-fledged Buddhist monk, but Zhengyi was apprehended because as a novice he did not yet have the same certification. Chaofan then went to lodge a complaint with the local yamen (county office) and was also arrested.

With all four of the monks arrested, they were brought before the county magistrate and interrogated about their role in the reported accusations of queue-clipping. The magistrate brought out the scissors and hair-tying cord found in Zhucheng's bag, but also produced two pieces of braided hair that were not initially recorded as items found by constable Cai. The magistrate then asked Zhucheng how many queues he had cut and Zhucheng denied ever having cut any queues. In response to Zhucheng's denial of guilt, the magistrate subjected him to courtroom torture through the use of the jiagun. In response to courtroom torture, Zhucheng withdrew his original statement and announced that all charges of queue-cutting were true. Deciding that Zhucheng's admission of guilt was insufficient, the magistrate proceeded to order the torture of the remaining three monks. While Jingxin eventually declared guilt as Zhucheng had done, Zhengyi and Chaofan contested the accusations and stated that constable Cai had only arrested them because they had refused to pay him bribe money. After this round of interrogation, the case was moved up to the next judicial level and the four monks were sent to the office of Shaoxing prefecture to undergo another round of interrogation. During this round of interrogation, only Zhucheng and Zhengyi were subjected to torture, which produced another set of testimonies to add to the case. At this point in the court proceedings, the court had a set of testimonies from the four monks that had a number of inconsistencies and the case was once again sent up to the next judicial level, the provincial judge in Hangzhou. By the time that the third interrogation occurred in Hangzhou, Zhengyi and Chaofan were still adhering to their original story that constable Cai had wrongly arrested them because they had been unwilling to pay him a bribe. The Hangzhou provincial judge, Judge Zeng, brought constable Cai in for questioning and eventually got the constable to admit that he had falsely accused Zhengyi and Chaofan, asked for a bribe and planted additional incriminating evidence in the monks' belongings to ensure that the charges of sorcery against the four monks would stick. After constable Cai's admission, he was punished and fired while the four monks were acquitted and set free with monetary compensation for the bones that had been broken during torture. By May 1768, at least two other individuals had been assaulted and beaten to death by people who suspected them of sorcery in Xiaoshan and Anji Counties. On May 3, a beggar named Qiu Yongnian was accused of carrying paper charms and tugging on the braid of a child, both of which were perceived as evidence of sorcery. After Qiu was brought in, the local constables rounded up two of his companions who were also beggars, Chen Hanru and Zhang Yucheng.

The three beggars were interrogated and subjected to courtroom torture to elicit confessions, but all three of the suspects pleaded innocence. After being subjected to the jiagun, the three beggars were transferred to the county yamen where they were tried by a Magistrate named Tu and put through another round of interrogation and torture. All three of the beggars pleaded innocence. Unable to procure a confession from the three beggars, Magistrate Tu ordered the beggars' release and posted a number of announcements that warned of the possibility of queue-clipping and encouraged victims of queue-clipping to report the crime to local officials. Despite Magistrate Tu's order to release all three of the beggars, Zhang was kept in prison because he had become ill and he eventually died under the care of prison officials.

==== Monks accused of soul-stealing in Xukou ====
In early May 1768, seven monks docked at the town of Xukou on the northeast shore of Lake Tai on their way to Suzhou where they planned to buy supplies for their temple in Huzhou. Fueled by rumors about queue-clipping monks, a mob of Xukou locals led by a fisherman named Zhang Zifa assaulted the seven monks and their boatman. After being beaten by the mob, the monks and the boatman were taken to authorities in Suzhou. During the monks' imprisonment in Suzhou, their belongings were stolen from the boat that they had docked at Xukou. After finding no evidence against the monks and absolving them of guilt, the Suzhou prefect forced fisherman Zhang to pay for what the monks and boatman had lost during their imprisonment.

=== June–August 1768 ===
By June 1768, the Qianlong Emperor was aware of the presence of queue-clipping rumors circulating near and throughout the lower Yangtze region and sent the following letter to the Zhejiang provincial office:

in the Zhejiang region it is said that, when bridges are being constructed, some persons are secretly clipping such things as people's hair and lapels for the purpose of casting spells for sinking the pilings. Now this belief has spread into Shandong. These rumors are truly absurd. It may be just petty thieves using the occasion to cast suspicion on others, so that they may more brazenly play their clever tricks. However, this kind of false story can easily delude and incite the public. Naturally it should be rigorously investigated and forbidden, in order to put an end to evil customs. Let it be known to the governors-general and governors in those jurisdictions that they are to order their subordinates secretly to undertake a thorough investigation. If this situation really exists, the culprits should be arrested forthwith and punished severely. Or it may be that arresting and severely punishing one or two ringleaders will serve as warning to others. Also they must proceed as if nothing momentous were happening (Budong Shengse), conduct their investigations in a proper manner, and not permit yamen underlings to get involved and use the occasion to stir up trouble and disturb local communities.

Between June and July, the rumors of queue-clipping sorcerers continued to spread out from the lower Yangtze region into surrounding provinces.

==== Soul-stealing in Shandong ====
In Shandong, rumors had begun to circulate about sorcerers who used "stupefying powder" to incapacitate their victims long enough to cut off their queues and steal their belongings. Hearing of this rumor, Governor Funihan of Shandong ordered local officials to investigate the matter. As a result of this investigation, a number of men were arrested on accusations of queue-clipping. This investigation revealed a larger network of individuals involved in queue-cutting. The leaders of this network were reported to be sorcerers that were seeking out and recruiting apprentices. Philip Kuhn explains that the investigating officials organized this network into a hierarchy after arresting Cai Tingzhang, Jin Guanzi and Han Peixian:

Queue-clipping Hierarchy
Queue-clipper	Intermediate Master	Grand Master
Cai Tingzhang	Tongyuan	Wuyuan
Jin Guanzi	Zhang Siru	Yushi
Han Peixian	Mingyuan	(unknown)

During his confession, Cai Tingzhang provided the following names of those he believed to be involved in queue-cutting:

- Monk Tongyuan who was identified as a leader of a group who practiced sorcery. This group included two of his followers and fellow monks: Yixing and Yian.
- Two men from Zhejiang province named Zhang and Wang, who had supposedly taught monk Dong the method of using stupefying powder.
- A monk named Wuyuan from Zhejiang who was supposedly the ringleader in a larger effort to recruit and train more queue-cutters. Members of this group of queue-cutting sorcerers are called "confederates" by Philip Kuhn.

During Jin Guanzi's confession, Chin explained that he had begun using stupefying powder and cutting queues after Zhang Siru had convinced Chin to join a group of queue-cutters led by the monk Yushi. In Chin's case, he had been arrested after cutting the queues of two young boys and raping one of them. In Han Peixian's confession, he explained that he had become the apprentice of a monk named Mingyuan who taught him the art of soul-stealing through the use of stupefying powder and queue-cutting. After these arrests and confessions, Governor Funihan continued his investigation and by August 11 had arrested five other individuals accused of queue-clipping. Each of the arrested queue-clippers pointed to a different ring-leader from Jiangnan. Philip Kuhn marks this as the start of what would become a hunt for "master sorcerers" who were thought to be orchestrating the rising unrest.

=== The hunt for master sorcerers ===
Upon hearing about the results of Governor Funihan's investigation in Shandong, the Qianlong Emperor ordered that the supposed master sorcerers be tracked down and arrested. In response to the emperor's edict, regional officials set out to identify and arrest sorcerers within their perspective jurisdictions. Throughout August, beggars and monks were incarcerated, interrogated and tortured in an effort to rout out all potential queue-cutting sorcerers and the supposed master sorcerers who led them.

==== Jiangnan investigation ====
By the middle of August in 1768 local officials had still failed to apprehend the purported master sorcerers, Wuyuan and Yushi. As a result, the Qianlong Emperor inquired about the status of these investigations and discovered that local officials had neglected to alert him of a number of sorcery-related accusations, assaults and trials that had been occurring in the Jiangnan area since January. Upon further investigation, Qianlong determined that many of these cases had been poorly dealt with and chastised the governor of Jiangsu, a man named Jangboo, for failing to maintain order in his jurisdiction. As a result of this scandal, governor Jangboo stepped down and was replaced by governor Yungde. When Yungde came into office, he put together a full report of the sorcery accusations in Zhejiang and sent the records to Emperor Qianlong. Upon receiving Yungde's report, Qianlong ordered that all of the masons, monks and beggars involved in the Zhejiang sorcery cases between January and May be rounded up and sent to Beijing.

==== The search for Zhang Siru ====
Accused by Jin Guanzi of being a leader within the suspected network of soul-stealers, Zhang Siru was a primary target during the hunt for master sorcerers. At the end of August, a beggar by a similar name (Zhang Si) was apprehended in a northern city in Anhui about eighty miles away from where officials suspected to find Zhang Siru. Upon interrogation, Zhang Si explained that he had been approached by a man named Zhao San, who had told Zhang that he would pay him to cut queues for him.

==== The Baoan Buddhist sect ====
A Buddhist sect in the upper regions of Zhili interpreted the 1768 rumors of sorcery as a bad omen and used the opportunity to convince people in the region to convert. In response to the Baoan Buddhist sect's efforts of conversion and predictions of woe, the Qianlong Emperor had the leaders of the sect beheaded and their followers executed, beaten or exiled.

==== October 1768 ====
By October 1768, the officials responsible for investigating accusations of sorcery had arrested and interrogated a number of individuals accused of queue-clipping, but had yet to apprehend any of the supposed master sorcerers. In a number of cases, the accused and the victims of the accused offered varying stories that changed after multiple interrogations and rounds of torture, which created a confused collection of reports that were added to the overall investigation. By the time the emperor returned from his summer palace to Beijing, a number of the accused had been sent to the Grand Council for trial and interrogation, including: queue-clippers from Shandong; the beggar Zhang Si along with his son; those involved in the accusations targeted at mason Wu; the Buddhist monks accused of soul-stealing in Xiaoshan; the beggars accused of soul-stealing in Suzhou and the monks accused of soul-stealing in Xukou. During the month of October, many of the queue-clippers and suspects implicated in the investigation of sorcery were interrogated under torture and produced a myriad of confessions that contradicted previous information given. These contradictory accounts forced investigators to question the existence of any master sorcerers. Philip Kuhn suggests that the confusion in these accounts might have been due to the fact that most of the confessions acquired had been forced out through repeated rounds of torture and long-term imprisonment, which left many of the accused queue-clippers sick and dying in prison.

=== End of the investigation ===
By November, the emperor and those in charge of investigating the possibility of a larger network of sorcerers and master sorcerers had been unable to find any evidence of either. Concluding that many of the cases pursued by the court had resulted in the punishment and imprisonment of a number of innocent individuals, the court set to work freeing a number of the accused. Among those acquitted were:

- The monks accused of soul-stealing in Xukou, all of whom survived imprisonment and the trials.
- The 3 beggars accused of soul-stealing in Suzhou, two of whom died during imprisonment and the trials.
- The Buddhist monks accused of soul-stealing in Xiaoshan City
- Those involved in the accusations targeted at mason Wu

In the end, the case was closed without the discovery of any master sorcerers. The investigation was ended not because the emperor and the grand council deemed the case unfounded, but because they decided that the investigation had been ruined by provincial officials.

== Events of 1876 ==
A similar rumor started in Nanjing in 1876. A bridge that had been recently destroyed by the Taiping Rebellion was being repaired. The original version of the rumor held that stonemasons needed souls to repair the bridge, and were collecting these souls in a jar that would be built into the bridge. Although the original version alleged that masons gathered souls by calling out the victim's name, a theory quickly arose that queue-cutting was another way to steal a soul. Religious groups and traveling peddlers began selling pieces of colored cloth that they claimed would protect the wearer from queue-stealing if sewn into their hat. This helped spread the panic to Suzhou, while simultaneously leading cloth sellers to be accused of profiteering or even soul-stealing. A new rumor emerged that magically animated "paper men" were cutting off the queues of travelers. Travelers would frantically check their queues if they bumped into a stranger on the road. The rumors spread throughout the Yangtze Delta area, and panicked villages stayed up all night banging gongs and cymbals to keep away the paper men. A common belief was that the paper men were controlled by evil magicians of some kind.

== See also ==
- List of mass hysteria cases
  - The witch trials in the early modern period that took place throughout Europe and North America and which scholars have compared to the soul-stealing panic.
  - Dancing mania, a form of mass hysteria common in early modern Europe
- Ee ja nai ka, a complex of carnivalesque religious celebrations and communal activities that occurred in many parts of Japan from June 1867 to May 1868. These events also prominently featured the use of protective amulets.
- Rebellions in Qing China

== Sources ==
- Kuhn, Philip A. (1990). Soulstealers: the Chinese sorcery scare of 1768. Cambridge, Massachusetts: Harvard University Press. ISBN 978-0-674-03977-3. OCLC 436076867.
- Haar, B.J. Ter (1992). "Towards a History of Qing Persecution". The White Lotus Teachings in Chinese Religious History. New York: EJ Brill.
- Su, Ping (December 2012). "清代妖術恐慌及政府的對策：以兩次剪辮謠言為例(4837631)" [Qing-era Sorcery Panics and the Government Response: Examples from Two Queue-cutting Rumors]. 二十一世紀. 74 (91.12).
