= Brodequin =

Brodequin may refer to:

- Brodequin (torture), a mediaeval torture device
- Brodequin (band), American death metal group
