= Zanzhi =

Chinese torture method

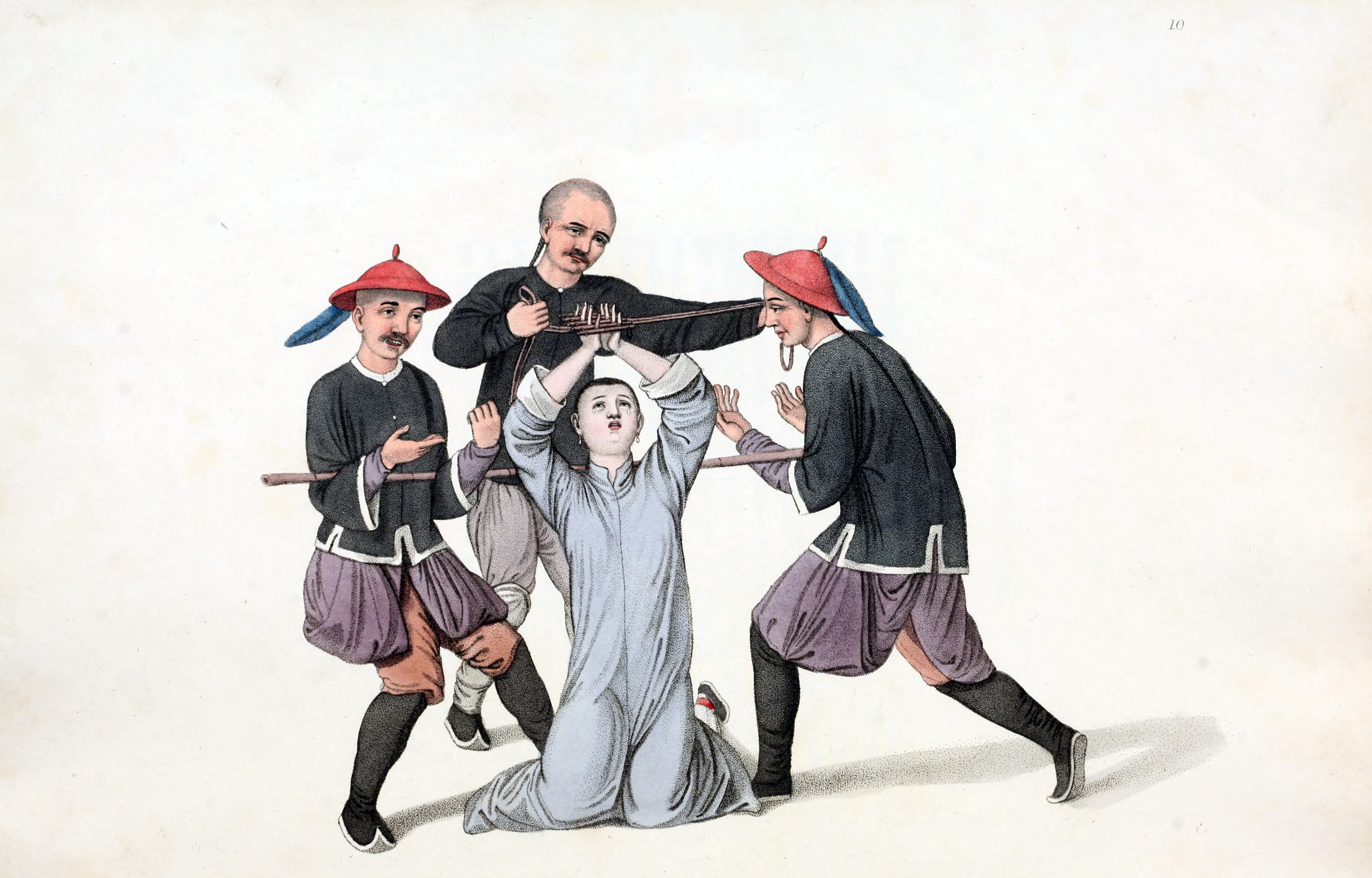
- "Torturing the Fingers", Mason and Dadley (1801)
- Chinese: 拶指
- Literal meaning: squeeze fingers
Transcriptions
Standard Mandarin
- Hanyu Pinyin: zǎnzhǐ
- Wade–Giles: tsan3-chih3
Yue: Cantonese
- Jyutping: zaat^{3}zi^{2}
Middle Chinese
- Middle Chinese: t͡suɑt̚t͡sɑnX
Old Chinese
- Zhengzhang: *ʔslaːdkijʔ

The zanzhi (拶指) finger crusher was a Chinese instrument of torture consisting of small sticks strung together with cords, which when placed around the fingers and gradually pulled, caused agonizing pain in order to force a confession. Under traditional Chinese law, a person could not be convicted of a crime unless they confessed. The zanzhi was a legal and non-lethal torture method for forcing women to confess, and for men there was the similar and more painful jiagun ankle crusher with three wooden planks that slowly compressed the feet.

== Names and pronunciations ==
The word zǎnzhǐ is written with two Chinese characters. The first (拶) has alternate readings of zā meaning "to force; to compel; to press" or zǎn "to squeeze the fingers (an ancient form of torture); the instrument used in the torture" (Wenlin 2016). The second character zhǐ (指) represents the common term for "finger".

In terms of Chinese character classification, both these logographs are phono-semantic characters; with the semantically-significant radical of "hand" (扌) the tortured body part and phonetic elements of yì (𡿩 "flow") and of zhǐ (旨 "intention"). Instead of the "hand" radical, zan (拶) had a variant form (桚) with the "wood" radical (木), signifying the material used to make a finger press.

Besides zǎnzhǐ two other names for the finger crusher are zǎnzi (拶子) with the common Chinese nominalizing affix zi (子) for the torture device, and zǎnxíng (拶刑) with "torture; corporal punishment" for the category.

Tean zu [sic] is a common misspelling of zanzhi (拶指) or zanzi (拶子) that was repeatedly copied in English-language sources from the mid-17th century to the present day. In linguistic and lexicographic terminology, tean zu is a ghost word.

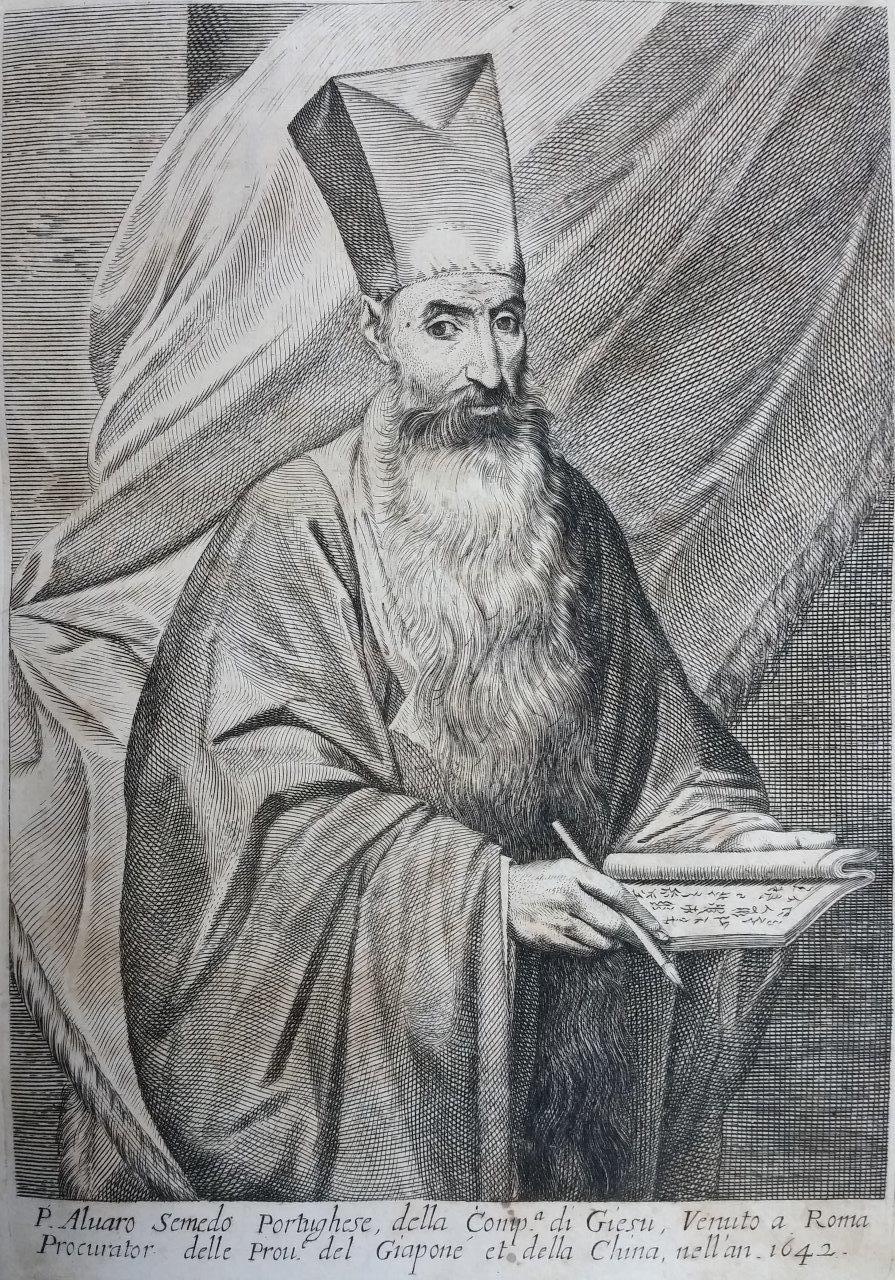
1642 depiction of Álvaro de Semedo

The tean zu error first appeared in an early Western-language description of China. Álvaro Semedo (1585-1658), the Portuguese Jesuit priest and missionary in China, wrote a classic 1642 Spanish-language account of China that was translated into several European languages, including the 1643 Italian-language version that first mentions the Chinese tean zu instrument of legal torture. The original 1642 Spanish publication, Imperio de la China ... mentions two torture devices for the hands and feet, yet only describes the jiagun called Kiaquen without mentioning the zanzhi (Semedo 1642, 187). The front cover identifies the Portuguese historian Manuel de Faria e Sousa (1590-1649) as the publisher, but Faria e Sousa later claimed authorship (Pina 2018, 36-37). Semedo had personal knowledge of the Chinese judicial system, he was "imprisoned for a year during the 1616 anti-Christian campaign and spent thirty days in a cage while being transported from Nanjing to Canton" (Brook 2008, 157).

The 1643 Italian translation by Giovanni Battista Giattini (1601-1672) gives Kia quen and adds the mistaken Chinese name Tean zu (Semedo 1643, 181). Written and published in only one year, this text was flawed by typographical and printing errors, "some of which were quite significant" (Pina 2018, 38). Thomas Henshaw's 1655 English translation of Semedo capitalizes the second syllables as Kia Quen and Tean Zu (Semedo 1655, 143). The 1667 French translation by Louis Coulon hyphenates Kia-quen and Tean-zu (Semedo 1667, 209).

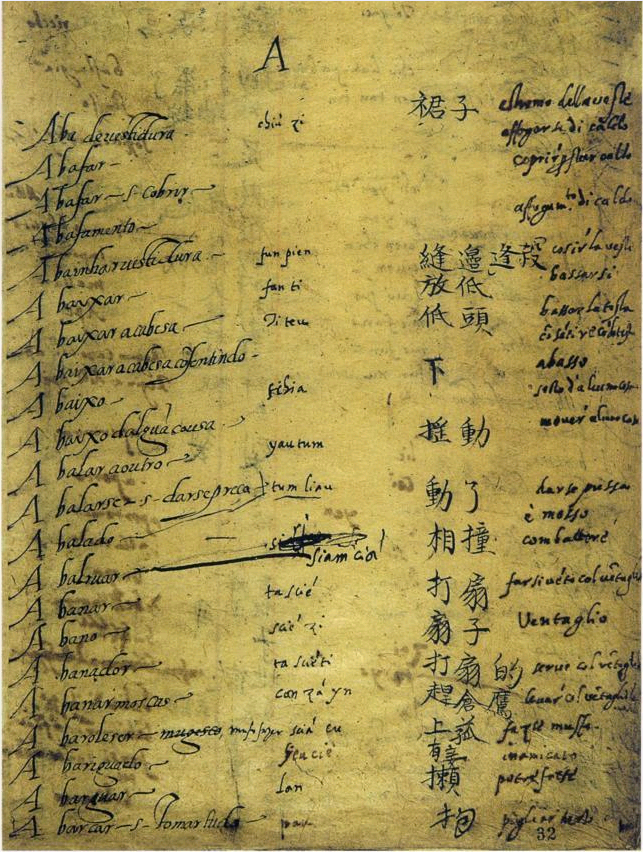
Ricci-Ruggieri Portuguese-Chinese dictionary

Álvaro Semedo's widely-translated book does not identify what romanization system is used for Chinese words, specifically his tean zu ghost word for zanzhi (拶指) or zanzi (拶子) and kia quen for jiagun (夾棍). When Semedo reached China in 1610, the Jesuit missionaries Michele Ruggieri (1543–1607) and Matteo Ricci (1552-1610) had developed the first Chinese romanization systems for transcribing Chinese words in the Latin alphabet. During 1583-88, Ruggieri and Ricci co-edited a Portuguese-Chinese dictionary, the Dizionario Portoghese-Cinese (葡漢辭典), which was the first bilingual European language dictionary of Chinese. In these two phonological systems, Pinyin zanzhi (拶指) is romanized as zanzu (Ruggieri) and chánçu (Ricci) and Pinyin zanzi (拶子) as zantsɪ (Ruggieri) and chánçù (Ricci) (Witek 2001, pp. 19, 1, and 21). In 1626 the Jesuit missionary Nicolas Trigault devised another Chinese romanization system, based mostly on Ricci's, in his Xiru Ermu Zi (西儒耳目資, literally "Aid to the Eyes and Ears of Western Literati").

Chinese linguists and sinologists have developed many transcription systems for Standard Mandarin. The tean zu spelling is not a recognizable Chinese word, but both tean and zu are used in modern Chinese transcription systems. In the Gwoyeu Romatzyh system, which alphabetically indicates the four tones of Mandarin by varying the spelling of syllables ("tonal spelling"), tean represents the third tone tiǎn, IPA /tʰiɛn/. The international standard Pinyin system uses zu for IPA /tsu/. Although there are several Chinese words pronounced tianzu, such as tiānzú (天足, "natural [unbound] feet", as opposed to footbinding), none of them refer to torture. While the precise origins of tean zu remain unknown, one possibility is that tean was a misprint of tsan. The Ruggieri system gives tsaŋ or ciam for zhuàng (狀, "form, shape") and tſaŋ or zam for zhuàng (撞, "collide, run into") (Witek 2001, 21). Compare the 19th century Wade-Giles tsan-tzŭ romanization for Pinyin zanzi (拶子).

== Early accounts of Chinese torture ==
The Spanish Augustinian Catholic bishop and author Juan González de Mendoza (1545-1618) published one of the earliest Western histories of China: the 1585 Spanish-language Historia de las cosas más notables, ritos y costumbres del gran reyno de la China (The History of the Great and Mighty Kingdom of China and the Situation Thereof), which describes the zanzhi and jiagun without noting their Chinese names. In the 1588 English translation,

Cruel torments. These judges do use two manner of torments to make them to confess the truth, when by fair means they can not, or by policy, the which first is procured with great care and diligence: the one is on their feet, and the other on their hands, and is so terrible that it cannot be suffered, but of force they do confess that which the judge doth pretend to know; yet do they execute none of them except first they have good information, or at the least, semiplena, or else so many inductions that it is a sufficient information for the same. The torments on the hands is given with two sticks as big as two fingers, and a span long, turned round and full of holes in all places, wherein are put cords to pull in and out their fingers of both their hands are put into the cords, and little and little they do pinch them, till in the end they do break them at the joints, with an incredible pain unto them that do suffer it, and it causes them to give great shrieks and groans that will move any man to compassion. And if it so come to passe that by this cruel torment they will not confess, and that the judge do understand by witness and by indiction that he is faulty and culpable, then doth he command to give him the torment of the feet, which is a great deal more cruel than that of the hands, and is in this sort: they take two pieces of wood, four square of four spans long and one span broad, and are joined together with a gume, and holes bored thorough, and put thorough them cords, and in the midst of these bords they do put the whole foot, and strain the cords, and with a mallet they do strike upon the cords, wherewith they do break all the bones, and cause them to suffer more pain and grief than with the torment of the hands. At the executing of these torments the supreme judges are always present, the which seldom times doth happen: for that such as be culpable will sooner confess than suffer those torments, desiring rather to die some other death that is not so cruel, than to suffer the pains of this torment. (de Mendoza 1585, tr. Parke 1588, 143; adapted to modern typography)

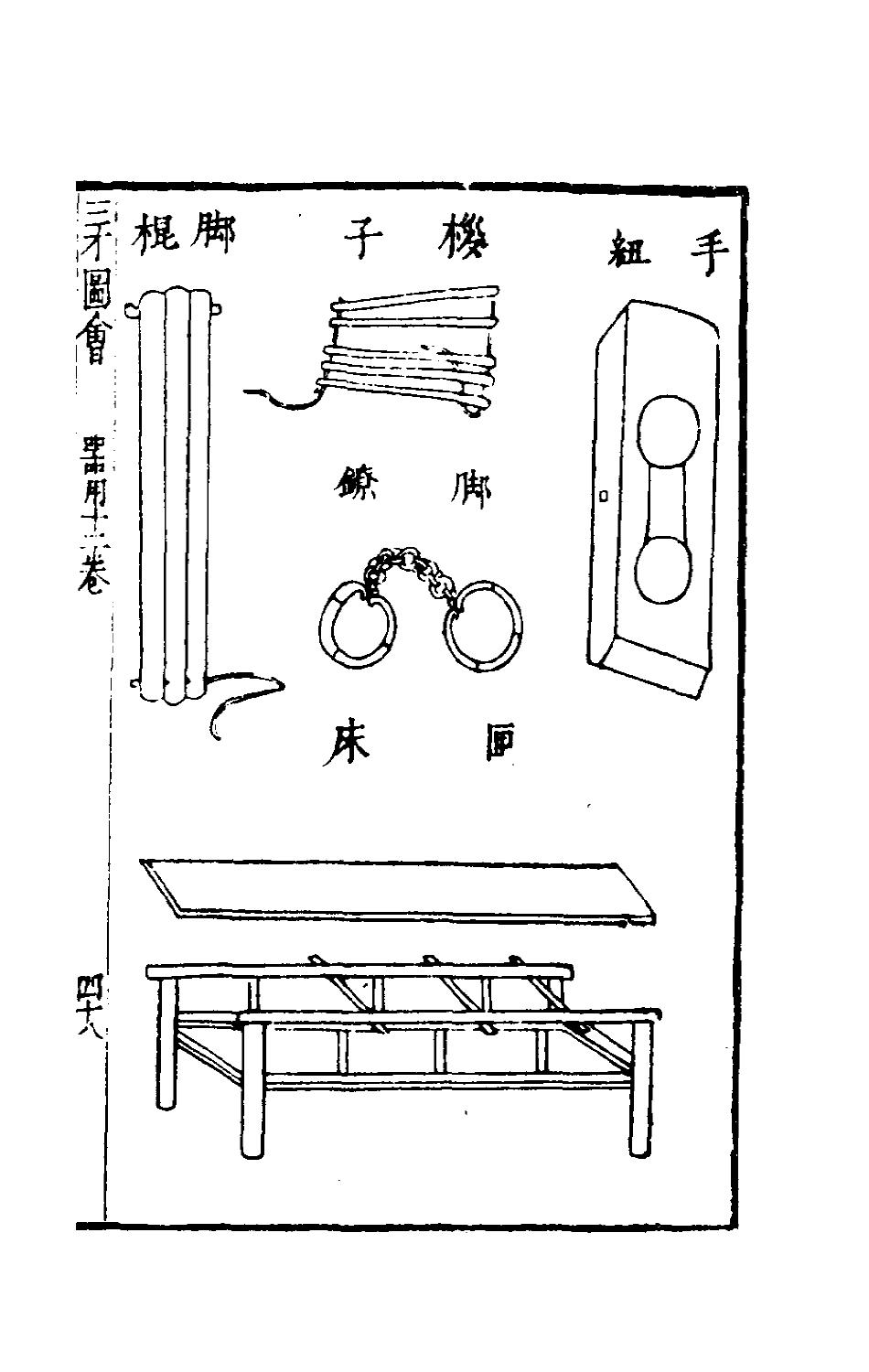
Ancient Chinese torture devices from the 1609 Sancai Tuhui, Clockwise from upper left: ankle press (jiaogun 腳棍), finger press (zanzi 桚子), wooden manacles (shoujiu 手紐), fetters (jiaoliao 腳鐐), and box-bed (xiachuang 匣床)

.

As mentioned above, the 1655 English version of Semedo's 1643 Italian translation says:

The Rack is used also in certain necessary cases. I do not know that they have above two kindes of it. That of the feet, and that of the hands. For the feet they use an instrument called Kia Quen, it consisteth of three pieces of wood put in one Traverse, that in the middle is fixe, the other two are moveable, between these their feet are put, where they are squeezed and press, till the heele-bone run into the foot: for the hands they use also certain small pieces of wood between their fingers, they call them Tean Zu then they straiten them very hard, and seale them round about with paper and so they have them for some space of time. (Semedo 1655, 143; adapted to modern typography.)

George Staunton's 1810 Fundamental Laws of China was the first foreign translation of the 1740-1805 Great Qing Legal Code, and gives precise instructions for constructing legal instruments of torture, including the jiagun and zanzhi. Note: the approximate equivalents for the below Chinese units of length, 1 "Chinese foot" or chi (che) is 33 cm and 1 "Chinese inch" cun (tsun) is 33 mm.

Instruments of torture of the following dimensions, may be used upon an investigation of a charge of robbery and homicide: The instruments for compressing the ankle-bones, shall consist of a middle piece, 3 Che 4 Tsun long, and two side-pieces, 3 Che each in length; the upper end of each piece shall be circular, and 1 Tsun 8 decimals in diameter; the lower ends shall be cut square, and, 2 Tsun in thickness: At a distance of 6 Tsun from the lower ends, four hollows, or sockets, shall be excavated, 1 Tsun 6 decimals in diameter, and 7 decimals of a Tsun in depth each; one, on each side the middle-piece, and one in each of the other pieces, to correspond. The lower ends being fixed and immovable, and the ankles of the criminal under examination being lodged between the sockets, a painful compression is effected by forcibly drawing together the upper ends. The instrument of torture for compressing the fingers, shall consist of 5 small round sticks, 7 Tsun in length, and 45/100 of a Tsun in diameter each: the application of this instrument is nearly similar to that of the former. In those cases wherein the use of torture is allowed, the offender, whenever he contumaciously refuses to confess the truth, shall forthwith be put to the question by torture; and it shall be lawful to repeat the operation a second time, if the criminal still refuses to make a confession. If the first application fails to elicit the truth, it is lawful to repeat the operation a second time, if the criminal still refuses to make a confession. (1810, 488-489)

George Ryley Scott's popular 1940 The History of Torture Throughout the Ages quotes Semedo (1655) and Staunton (1810), adding that the kia quen and tean zu "were not applicable, however, to criminals under fifteen years of age or over seventy; to the diseased or the crippled." (Scott 1940, 103).

== Other translations ==
Translating zanzhi into English is problematic. The near-equivalent word thumbscrew is also a torture device for the fingers but differs in design and construction. Chinese-English dictionaries and books about China generally describe the zanzhi:

- "to squeeze, by pieces of wood put between the fingers, whilst the ends are compressed" (Morrison 1815, 209)
- "Pieces of wood arranged so as to be drawn tight together by strings, and formerly used for squeezing the fingers of prisoners or witnesses in order to extort evidence, but declared under the present dynasty to be illegal" (Giles 1912, 1428)
- "An instrument of torture for squeezing the fingers of prisoners or witnesses in order to extort evidence or confession" (Mathews 1931, 979)
- "Press fingers between sticks as a form of torture" (Lin 1972)
- "crush fingers between sticks (as torture)" (DeFrancis 1996)
- "finger squeezer" (Theobold 2000)
- "finger press" (Brook et al. 2008, 43)
- "to squeeze the fingers (old form of torture)" (CEDICT 2022)

== See also ==
- Chinese finger trap
