= Strappado (disambiguation) =

Strappado is a form of torture.

Strappado may also refer to:

- Strappado bondage, a related technique in BDSM play
- Strappado, a 1986 album by Slaughter (Canadian band)
- "Strappado", track on 2000 album Instruments of Torture by Brodequin
- "Strappado", a 2009 short story by Laird Barron

== See also ==
- A Strappado for the Divell, a satirical work by Richard Brathwait ((1588–1673)
