= Wei Zhouzuo =

Wei Zhouzuo 衛周祚

Grand Secretary of the Baohe Hall
- In office 1672

Grand Secretary of the Palace Historiographic Academy
- In office 1661–1669

Grand Secretary of the Wenyuan Library
- In office 1658–1661

Grand Secretary of the Palace Academy for the Advancement of Literature
- In office 1658

Minister of Personnel
- In office June 7 – June 27, 1658 Serving with Ke'erkun
- Preceded by: Wang Yongji
- Succeeded by: Sun Tingquan

Personal details
- Born: 1612; Quwo County, Shanxi, Ming China
- Died: 1675 (aged 62–63); Beijing, Qing China

Wei Zhouzuo (simplified Chinese: 卫周祚; traditional Chinese: 衛周祚; pinyin: Wèi Zhōuzuò) (1612–1675), courtesy name Wenxi (simplified Chinese: 文锡; traditional Chinese: 文錫; pinyin: Wénxī), art name Wenshi (simplified Chinese: 闻石; traditional Chinese: 聞石; pinyin: Wénshí), was an official who served in the late Ming dynasty and early Qing dynasty. He was a native of Chengnei (城內). He took the imperial examination and obtained a jinshi degree in 1637 during the reign of the Chongzhen Emperor.

After the fall of the Ming dynasty, Wei served under the Qing in various capacities. In 1653, he was named Vice-President of Punishments, in 1654 President of Works, and in 1658 President of Civil Appointments, as well as Grand Secretary. In 1660 he worked with the Qing noble Bahana to revise the Great Qing Legal Code.
