= Great Qing Legal Code =

Legal code of the Qing empire (1644–1912)

Chinese name
- Chinese: 大清律例
Transcriptions
Standard Mandarin
- Hanyu Pinyin: Dàqīng lǜlì
- Wade–Giles: Ta4-ch'ing1 Lü4-li4
Yue: Cantonese
- Yale Romanization: daaih chīng leuht laih
- Jyutping: daai6 cing1 leot6 lai6

Manchu name
- Manchu script: ᡩᠠᡳ᠌ᠴᡳᠩ ᡤᡠᡵᡠᠨ ‍‍ᡳ ᡶᠠᡶᡠᠨ ‍‍ᡳ ᠪᡳᡨᡥᡝ ᡴᠣᠣᠯᡳ
- Abkai: Daiqing guruni fafuni bithe kooli

The Great Qing Legal Code (or Great Ching Legal Code), (Note: Chinese: 大清律例; pinyin: Dà Qīng lǜ lì; Manchu: ᡩᠠᡳ᠌ᠴᡳᠩ ᡤᡠᡵᡠᠨ ‍‍ᡳ ᡶᠠᡶᡠᠨ ‍‍ᡳ ᠪᡳᡨᡥᡝ ᡴᠣᠣᠯᡳ, romanized: Daicing gurun-i fafun-i bithe kooli) also known as the Qing Code (Ching Code) or, in Hong Kong law, as the Ta Tsing Leu Lee (大清律例), was the legal code of the Qing empire (1644–1912). The code was based on the Ming legal code, the Great Ming Legal Code, which was kept largely intact. Compared to the Ming Code, which had no more than several hundred statutes and sub-statutes, the Qing Code contained 1,907 statutes across over 30 revisions between 1644 and 1912. One of the earliest of these revisions was in 1660, completed by the Qing official Wei Zhouzuo and the noble Bahana.

The Qing Code was the last legal code of Imperial China. By the end of the Qing dynasty, it had been the only legal code enforced in China for nearly 270 years. Even with the fall of the imperial Qing in 1912, the Confucian philosophy of social control enshrined in the Qing Code remained influential in the subsequent German law-based legal system of the Republic of China, and later, the Soviet-based system of the People's Republic of China. Part of the Qing Code was also used in British Hong Kong until 1971.

The code resulted from a complex legal culture and occupied the central position of the Qing legal system. It showed a high level of continuity with the Tang Legal Code, which indicated an active legal tradition at the highest level of Imperial Chinese bureaucracy that had existed for at least a thousand years.

== Structure ==
The Great Qing Code comprises 436 articles divided into seven parts, further subdivided into chapters. The first part (Names and General Rules) is a General Part, similar to that of Germany's Bürgerliches Gesetzbuch, which contains the general legal rules, principles, and concepts applied to the rest of the Code. The other six parts are named after the Six Ministries of government, and each part contains laws that are perceived as applicable to each ministry.

1. Names and General Rules, Articles 1–46 – includes laws on the Five Punishments (art. 1) and the Ten Great Wrongs (art. 2)
2. Laws relating to the Board of Personnel, Articles 47–74 – includes laws on the System of Offices (ch. 1) and Official Rules for Carrying Public Administration (ch. 2)
3. Laws relating to the Board of Revenue, Articles 75–156 – includes laws on Marriage (ch. 3–4; art. 101–107) and Taxes (ch.7; art. 141–148)
4. Laws relating to the Board of Rites, Articles 157–182 – includes laws on Sacrifices (ch. 1) and Rules of Demeanor (ch. 2)
5. Laws relating to the Board of War, Articles 183–253 – includes laws on Guarding the Palace (ch. 1; art. 183–198) and Military Affairs (ch. 2; art. 199–219)
6. Laws relating to the Board of Punishments, Articles 254–423 – includes laws on Homicide (ch. 8–10; art. 282–301)
7. Laws relating to the Board of Works, Articles 424–436 – includes laws pertaining to Construction (ch. 1) and Dikes (ch. 2)

== Five Punishments ==
The Five Punishments in the Code contained in Article 1 are:

1. Punishment of beating with the light bamboo
2. Punishment of beating with the heavy bamboo
3. Penal servitude
4. Punishment of exile
5. Penalty of death

== Nature of the Code ==
A traditional Chinese legal system was largely in place during the Qin dynasty. Amalgamation of a Confucian worldview and a legal code was considered complete by the Tang Code (624 CE), which was regarded as a model of precision and clarity in terms of drafting and structure. Neo-Confucianism continued to be the state orthodoxy under the Song, Ming, and Qing dynasties. The Confucian foundations of the Tang Code were retained throughout the centuries, with some aspects strengthened.

During the Qing dynasty, criminal justice was based on a highly detailed criminal code. One element of the traditional Chinese criminal justice system is the notion that criminal law has a moral purpose: to get the convicted to repent and see the error of his ways. In the traditional Chinese legal system, a person could not be convicted of a crime unless confessed. This often led to using torture, to extract the necessary confession. An example of the use of torture and the risk of false confession was seen in The Chinese Sorcery Scare of 1768. These elements still influence modern Chinese views toward law. All death sentences were reported to the capital and required the personal approval of the emperor.

There was no civil code separate from the criminal code, which led to the now discredited belief that traditional Chinese law had no civil law. More recent studies have demonstrated that most of the magistrates' legal work was in civil disputes and that there was an elaborate system of civil law which used the Qing Code to establish torts.

The Qing Code was in the form of exclusively a criminal code. Its statutes throughout stated prohibitions and restrictions, violations of which were subject to a range of punishments by a legalist state. In practice, however, large sections of the code and its sub-statutes dealt with matters that would properly be characterized as civil law. The populace made extensive use (perhaps a third of all cases) of the local magistrate courts to bring suits or threaten to sue on a whole range of civil disputes, characterized as "minor matters" in the Qing Code. Moreover, in practice, magistrates frequently tempered the application of the code by taking prevalent local customs into account in their decisions. Filed complaints were often settled among the parties before they received a formal court hearing, sometimes under the influence of probable action by the court.

== Qing Code and the West ==
The Great Qing Legal Code was the first written Chinese work directly translated into English. The translation, known as Fundamental Laws of China was completed by English traveller Sir George Staunton in 1810. It was the first time the Qing Code had been translated into a European language. The French translation was published in 1812.

The First and Second Opium Wars between the Qing dynasty and several Western powers led to the forced signing of several unequal treaties by the Chinese government, which granted subjects of the foreign nations in question extraterritoriality in China, which included being exempted from the Great Qing Legal Code. According to historian Ronald C. Po, foreign exemption from Chinese laws resulted from the unequal treaties "substantially challenged" Chinese control over its maritime border.

In the late Qing dynasty, there was a concerted effort to establish legal codes based on European models as a part of the Self-Strengthening Movement. Due to the German victory in the Franco-Prussian War and because Imperial Japan was used as the model for political and legal reform, the adopted legal code was modeled closely on that of Germany.

== End of the Qing Code and its legacy ==
In the early 20th century, with the advent of the "Constitutional Movement", the imperial government was forced by various pressures to modernize its legal system quickly. While the Qing Code remained law, it was qualified and supplemented in quick succession by the Outline of the Imperial Constitution (1908) and the Nineteen Important Constitutional Covenants (1911), as well as various specialist laws, such as the Great Qing Copyright Code (1910).

In 1912, the collapse of the Qing dynasty ended their 268 years of imperial rule over China, along with 2,000 years of Chinese imperial history. The Qing court was replaced by the Republic of China government. While some parts of the Qing Code and other late Qing statutes were adopted for "temporary application" by the Beiyang Government of the Republic of China, as a general legal position, the Qing Code ceased to have effect de jure due to the dissolution of the Qing state.

=== Republic of China ===
The newly founded Republic of China adopted the existing German-based legal codes from the Qing era, but these codes were not immediately put into practice. Following the overthrow of the Qing dynasty in 1912, China came under the control of rival warlords and had no government strong enough to establish a legal code to replace the Qing Code. Finally, in 1927, Chiang Kai-shek's Kuomintang government attempted to develop Western-style legal and penal systems. Few of the Kuomintang codes, however, were implemented nationwide. Although government leaders strove for a Western-inspired codified law system, the traditional Chinese preference for collective social sanctions over impersonal legalism hindered constitutional and legal development. The spirit of the new rules never penetrated to the grass-roots level or provided hoped-for stability. Ideally, individuals were to be equal before the law, but this premise proved more rhetorical than substantive.

Law in the Republic of China on Taiwan today is based on the German-based legal system brought by the Kuomintang. The influence of the Qing Code manifests itself in the form of an exceptionally detailed penal code, with many offenses punishable by death. For example, in addition to the offense of piracy, there are also "piracy causing grievous bodily harm" (punishable by death or life imprisonment under Section 3 of Article 333 of the Criminal Code of the Republic of China (中華民國刑法)), as well as "piracy causing death" and "piracy with arson, rape, kidnapping or murder" (both entail mandatory death penalty under Section 3 of Article 333 and Article 334 of the Criminal Code). One legacy from that bygone era is the offense of "murder of a family member" (e.g. patricide and matricide), which entails life imprisonment or death under Section 1 of Article 272 of the Criminal Code. This applied even to minors under 18 years old, until the abolition of Section 2 of Article 63 of the Criminal Code—which allowed for life imprisonment or the death penalty against minors committing crimes under Section 1 of Article 272—on July 1, 2006.

=== People's Republic of China ===
While the legal system in the People's Republic of China was, and to some extent still is, based on socialist law, it incorporates certain aspects of the Qing Code, most notably the notion that offenders should be shamed into repentance. This took the form of the practice of parading condemned criminals in public from 1927 (the beginning of the Agrarian Revolutionary War) to 1988, when "the declaration of the Supreme People's Court, the Supreme People's Procuratorate and the Ministry of Public Security on resolutely stopping the street display of convicted and unconvicted criminals" was issued.

=== Hong Kong ===
In Hong Kong, after the establishment of British rule in 1841, the Great Qing Legal Code remained in force for the local Chinese population. Until the end of the 19th century, Chinese offenders were still executed by decapitation, whereas British offenders would be put to death by hanging. Even long into the 20th century and well after the fall of the Qing dynasty in China, Chinese men in Hong Kong could still practice concubinage and polygamous kim-t'iu marriages permitted by the Qing Code, a situation that ended only with the passing of the Marriage Reform Ordinance 1970 (Cap. 178), which came into force on 7 October 1971. Until that point, the Great Qing Legal Code had been enforced in some form for 327 years (from 1644 to 1971).

Because there are still living concubines married before the Marriage Reform Ordinance (Cap. 178), and their rights (of inheritance, and the inheritance rights of their sons and daughters) are respected by the Hong Kong legal system (even after the 1997 handover), the Great Qing Legal Code is still admissible in evidence when handling legal cases relating to events that occurred before 1971.

== See also ==
- Chinese law
- Traditional Chinese law
- Law of the People's Republic of China
- Law of Taiwan
- Five Punishments
- Ten Abominations

== Works cited ==
- Jones, William C. (1994). The Great Qing Code: A New Translation. Oxford: Clarendon Press; New York: Oxford University Press. ISBN 0198257945. OCLC 28337540.
