= Eight Deliberations =

Mitigating principles in traditional Chinese law

Eight Deliberations (traditional Chinese: 八議; simplified Chinese: 八议; pinyin: Bā Yì), also translated as Eight Considerations, Eight Discussions, Eight Discussed Cases or Eight Precedents, was a set of principles used by traditional Chinese law in order to lessen legal punishment on the royals, nobles and members of upper classes.

== Origins ==
The Eight Deliberations were established by the Cao Wei dynasty during the Three Kingdoms period and originated from similar regulations in the Rites of Zhou. These suggested that criminals qualified under the following eight conditions could be considered for a commutation of sentence:

- Relatives of the sovereign
- Old acquaintances of the sovereign
- Individuals of great virtue
- Individuals of great ability
- Meritorious individuals
- High officials
- Individuals exceptionally zealous at their government duties
- Guests of the sovereign (i.e. the descendants of preceding imperial families)

== Eight Deliberations as a Legal Privilege ==
The earliest records of the whole set of Eight Deliberations existing nowadays can be found in the Tang Code, with its Article 7 exactly entitled the same name. According to it, permission from the emperor was required before any kind of interrogation or judgement could be carried out towards the offenders of the legally favored categories. However, as pointed out in Article 8, the legal privilege was not applicable to cases involving violation of the Ten Abominations.

Since the Eight Deliberations was introduced, all of the following Chinese dynasties maintained the installment of this system to their law.

=== Deliberation for Relatives of the Emperor ===
Deliberation for Relatives of the Emperor (議親; 议亲; Yì Qīn) included the relatives of the emperor of the sixth degree of mourning and closer. In addition, the emperor's paternal grandmother's and his mother's relatives within the fifth or closer degree of mourning, the empress's relatives within the fourth or closer degree of mourning were also considered.

=== Deliberation for Old Retainers of the Emperor ===
Deliberation for Old Retainers of the Emperor (議故; 议故; Yì Gù) included those who had been in the emperor's service for a long period of time thereby merited this favor.

=== Deliberation for the Morally Worthy ===
Deliberation for the Morally Worthy (議賢; 议贤; Yì Xián) included worthy men or superior men whose speech and conduct were greatly virtuous and may be taken as a model for the country.

=== Deliberation for Ability ===
Deliberation for Ability (議能; 议能; Yì Néng) included people of great talent, able to lead armies, manage the affairs of government, correct the course of the emperor, and serve as a model for human relationships.

=== Deliberation for Achievement ===
Deliberation for Achievement (議功; 议功; Yì Gōng) included those of great achievement and glory because of their capability of leading armies for a long distance or civilizing the multitudes.

=== Deliberation for High Position ===
Deliberation for High Position (議貴; 议贵; Yì Guì) included all active duty officials of the third rank (品; Pǐn) and above, titular officials of the second rank and above, and persons with noble titles of the first rank.

=== Deliberation for Diligence ===
Deliberation for Diligence (議勤; 议勤; Yì Qín) included military and civil officials who have displayed great diligence in their work through thorough occupation of public affairs or experiencing dangerous difficulties.

=== Deliberation for Guests of the State ===
Deliberation for Guests of the State (議賓; 议宾; Yì Bīn) was to treat the descendants of previous dynasties as guests of the state who could enjoy a legal privilege.
