= Tablilla =

Torture method

The tablillas are an alleged Medieval Spanish technique of torture for crushing the toes and fingers by means of pillories and wedges.

== Description and procedure ==
The only writer to comment in detail on the torture of the tablillas may be paraphrased as follows: "The torture of the tablillas is rarely given, the subject trussed up as for the torture of water and cords; having not obtained confession, four palm-sized tablillas are brought, each with five narrow finger-width or toe-width holes, and to give grave pain they hammer a wedge, bit by bit, between the hole and the trapped finger or toe, one after the other; and the fingers and toes are so crushed and beaten, and the torture quite remarkably savage that rarely do the judges exhaust the wedges, for some faint and others confess the crime."

Since the prisoner being stretched on the rack typically had his hands bound to the moving rollers while his bare feet were immobilized in a stocks, one imagines that the torture was more commonly inflicted upon the toes. One also presumes that rough wedges were used, additionally skinning and shredding flesh from the toes during the crushing process.

Since the French brodequin was open at the front, the same effect could be achieved by simply hammering wedges between the exposed toes. However, the tablillas gave the torturer finer control, specifically, the ability to crush one toe at a time before proceeding to the next. Another alternative is to position six pencils around and between the toes of either foot and, using two hands positioned on either side of the five toes, slowly squeeze the pencils together until the prisoner loses consciousness.

The historicity of the tablillas is legitimately disputed. If real, one wonders why such an effective and cheap technique—requiring only wedges, a mallet, and toe restraints—did not become the predominant torture throughout Europe.
