= Brodequin (band) =

American death metal band

- Origin: Knoxville, Tennessee, U.S.
- Genres: Brutal death metal
- Years active: 1998–2008, 2015–present
- Labels: Unmatched Brutality, Season of Mist
- Members: Jamie Bailey; Mike Bailey; Brennan Shackelford
- Past members: Jon Engman; Chad Walls; Jan Van Lugtenburg; Henning Paulsen; Joaquin Chavez

Brodequin is an American death metal band from Knoxville, Tennessee, United States. Formed in 1998 by brothers Mike and Jamie Bailey, the band has released four albums and two EPs, their latest release being Harbinger of Woe, which was released in 2024.

== Themes ==
Bassist/vocalist Jamie Bailey chose the band's name. It is inspired by the medieval torture device of the same name. Torture devices are referred to frequently in the group's lyrics. Lyrics describing dismemberment, torture, murder, and abuse are common in death metal, but Brodequin explores it from a historical context. Jamie Bailey is a history graduate and most of his lyrics are inspired by real historical events.

== Members ==
=== Current members ===
- Jamie Bailey - bass, vocals (1998-2008, 2015-present)
- Mike Bailey - guitars (1998-2008, 2015-2016, 2020-present)
- Brennan Shackelford - drums (2020-present)

=== Former members ===
- Chad Walls - drums (1998-2002)
- Jon Engman - drums (2002-2005, 2015-2016)
- Henning Paulsen - drums (2005-2008)
- Jan Van Lugtenburg - drums (2016-2020)
- Joaquin Chavez - guitars (2016-2022)

== Discography ==
=== Studio albums ===
- Instruments of Torture (2000)
- Festival of Death (2001)
- Methods of Execution (2004)
- Harbinger of Woe (2024)

=== EPs ===
- Prelude to Execution (2003)
- Perpetuation of Suffering (2021)

=== Demo albums ===
- Brodequin (1999)

=== Split albums ===
- Created to Kill (with Drowning, Aborted, and Misery Index) (2002)
- Prelude to Execution/Stop the Madness (with Tears of Decay) (2004)
