= George Ryley Scott =

British author

George Ryley Scott (6 October 1886 – 1955) was a prolific British author of books about sexual intercourse, active from the late 1920s to the 1950s. He also wrote on the subjects of poultry, health, corporal punishment, and writing itself. His 1936 book, History of Prostitution from Antiquity to the Present Day, which has been much reprinted, was the first work of its kind to promote a tolerationist, rather than abolitionist perspective.

== Works ==
- The Rhode Island Red : its history, breeding, management, exhibition, and judging (?, 2nd ed. 1919)
- Modern poultry-keeping (1925; 3rd ed. 1948)
- Such Outlaws as Jesse James (1943, Second Impression 1945)
- The truth about poultry (1927)
- The truth about birth control: a guide for medical, legal & sociological students (1928)
- Sex and its mysteries (1929, revised edition 1948)
- Ten Ladies of Joy (1929) – profiles of Queen Elizabeth, La Reine Margot, Ninon de Lenclos, Nell Gwyn, Catherine the Great, Madame du Barry, Lady Halton, Madame de Staël, George Sand, and Lady Blessington.
- Poultry Trade Secrets (1929; 2nd ed., 1939; 3rd ed.: Secrets of successful poultry-keeping (1948)
- Marriage in the Melting Pot (1930)
- Modern birth control methods : how to avoid pregnancy : an examination of the technique, indications for, and comparative efficacy of, birth control methods : with an appendix on the facilitation of conception (1933)
- The new art of love: a practical guide for the married and those about to marry (1934)
- The art of faking exhibition poultry : an examination of the faker's methods and processes; with some observations on their detection (1934)
- Facts and fallacies of practical birth control : including an examination of the "natural method" of contraception, of the Gräfenberg ring, and of sterilization (1935)
- A History of Prostitution from Antiquity to the Present Day (1936; revised edition 1968: Ladies of Vice: a history of prostitution from antiquity to the present day)
- The Common Sense of Nudism: Including a Survey of Sun-Bathing and "Light Treatments" (1936)
- Male methods of birth control : their technique and reliability; a practical handbook for men (1937)
- The sex life of man and woman : a practical contribution to the solution of the problems, difficulties and dangers connected with sex, love and marriage as they affect every man and woman (1937)
- The History Of Corporal Punishment: A Survey Of Flagellation In Its Historical Anthropological And Sociological Aspects (1938)
- The story of baths and bathing (1939)
- Encyclopaedia of Sex (1939)
- The History Of Torture Throughout the Ages (1940; reprinted as A History of Torture)
- Sex problems and dangers in war-time : a book of practical advice for men and women on the fighting home fronts (1940)
- Phallic Worship: A History of Sex and Sex Rites in Relation to the Religions of All Races from Antiquity to the Present Day (Privately printed, 1941; new edition 1966, entitled Phallic Worship: A History of Sex and Sexual Rites.)
- Produce your own eggs now, or, How to keep chickens in war-time (1941)
- Successful writing: a guide to authors of non-fiction books and articles (1943)
- Far Eastern Sex Life: An Anthropological, Ethnological and Sociological Study of the Oriental Peoples (1943)
- Secrets of keeping healthy and living long : a practical guide (1944)
- Venereal Disease: Its Prevention and Conquest (1944)
- "Into whose hands" : an examination of obscene libel in its legal, sociological and literary aspects (1945)
- Female methods of birth control : their technique & reliability. A practical handbook for women (1946)
- Your sex questions answered : answers to three hundred questions on sex, marriage, and birth control (1947)
- Sex Problems and Dangers (1948)
- The History of Capital Punishment (1950)
- Swan's Anglo-American dictionary (Swan publishers, 1950)
- The quest for youth : a study of all available methods of rejuvenation and of retaining physical and mental vigor in old age (1953)
- Far Eastern sex life: an anthropological, ethnological, and sociological study of the love relations, marriage rites, and home life of the Oriental peoples (1943)
- Curious Customs Of Sex And Marriage (1953)
- Flogging: Yes or No? (1953)
- The History Of Cockfighting (1957)
- Sex in married life : a practical handbook for men and women (1965)
- Rabbit Keeping (1979)
