= Traditional Chinese law =

Laws of Imperial China

Traditional Chinese law refers to the legal system including laws, regulations, and rules used in Sinosphere. It has undergone continuous development since at least the 11th century BCE. This legal tradition is distinct from the common law and civil law traditions of the West – as well as Islamic law and classical Hindu law – and to a great extent, is contrary to the concepts of contemporary Chinese law. It incorporates elements of both Legalist and Confucian traditions of social order and governance.

One feature of the traditional Chinese criminal procedure is that it was an inquisitorial system where the judge, usually the district magistrate, conducts the public investigation of a crime. This is comparable to the system used in civil law jurisdictions, but contrary to common law which uses an adversarial system where the judge decides between attorneys representing the prosecution and defense. "The Chinese traditionally despised the role of advocate and saw such people as parasites who attempted to profit from the difficulties of others. The magistrate saw himself as someone seeking the truth, not a partisan for either side."

Two traditional Chinese terms approximate "law" in the modern Western sense. The first, fǎ (法), means primarily "norm" or "model". The second, lǜ (律), is usually rendered as "statute".

== History ==
=== Early development ===
Laws were developed by government officials to regulate ancient Chinese society. The laws of the aristocratic societies of early China put substantial emphasis on maintaining distinct ranks and orders amongst the nobles, in addition to controlling the populace. As a result, lǐ (禮), meaning "ritual" or "etiquette," governed the conduct of the nobles, whilst xíng (刑), the rules of punishment, governed the commoners and slaves.

The early rulers of the Zhou dynasty issued or enforced laws that already exemplified the values of a primogeniture regime, most notable of which is filial piety.Chinas first rulers were apart of the Xia Dynasty The earliest document on the law in China that is generally regarded as authentic is the Kang Gao (康誥), a set of instructions issued by King Wu of Zhou to a younger prince for the government of a fief. The Kang Gao is a chapter of the Book of Documents.

During the 6th century BC, several of the independent states into which the Zhou kingdom had fragmented codified their penal laws and inscribed them on bronze cauldrons. For example, at least two codifications from the state of Zheng survive, from 536 BC and 504 BC – the first on cauldrons and the second on bamboo. Additionally, other notable codes include the codes of Wei, drafted by Li Kui. Such codification was part of the process by which rulers attempted to make the central administration of the state more effective. However, they attracted criticism from orthodox statesmen, including Confucius, on the basis that they eroded the distinction between the "noble" and the "base."

The Five Punishments dated from this time.

=== Legalism and Qin ===
In 221 BC, the state of Qin finally obtained supremacy over its rivals and thus the Qin dynasty was founded. One of the reasons for its success was the adoption, on the advice of Lord Shang Yang, of far-reaching penal and administrative codes in the 4th century BC. The laws imposed severe punishments for failure to comply with duties imposed by the state and on the whole punished all alike. During this stage, law was marked by a purely Legalist spirit, hostile to the moral values advocated by the Confucian school of thought.

The Legalist school, as represented by such thinkers as Han Fei Zi, insisted that the ruler must always rely on penal law and the imposition of heavy punishments as the main instrument of the government. At the same time, moral considerations and social standing should be rigorously excluded. Another hallmark of Legalist thinking was that equality should be before the law. On the question of legislative technique, the Legalists stressed that the rules enacted by the ruler for punishment of offences should be clear and intelligible to the ordinary people, and they should be properly communicated to the populace.

Multiple corporal punishments were implemented by the Qin, such as death by boiling, chariots, beating, and permanent mutilation in the form of tattooing and castration. People who committed crimes were also sentenced to hard labor for the state.

Legalism survived in a diluted form after the Han dynasty succeeded the Qin. It was recognised that there was a need for complex penal and administrative codes that enabled the emperor to govern the country through a hierarchy of ministers and officials, all ultimately responsible to him. Imperial legal systems all retained the original Legalist insistence that the powers of officials be defined in detail and that punishments be prescribed for transgressions, whether inadvertent or not. Han lawmakers took account of Confucian values and introduced rules designed to implement them.

By 167 BC the law had changed so that castration was not used as a punishment itself; instead becoming an optional replacement for execution.

=== Tang Code ===
This process continued throughout the Han and later dynasties, culminating in the Tang dynasty. Ch'ü T'ung-tsu has shown that the "Confucianisation" of Chinese law was a slow process and that the amalgamation of the Confucian views of society with the law codes was completed only in the great Tang Code of 624 AD. The code is regarded as a model of precision and clarity in terms of drafting and structure.

The original Tang Code was promulgated in 624, by the founding Emperor (Gaozu) of the Tang dynasty. It would become in modern times the earliest fully preserved legal code in the history of Chinese law. It was endowed with a commentary, known as Tanglu Shuyi, incorporated in 653, the fourth year of the reign of Perpetual Splendour, as part of the Tang Code of Perpetual Splendour.

The Tang Code was based on the Code of Northern Zhou (Bei Zhou Lu, 557–581), promulgated 89 years earlier in 564, which was in turn based on the earlier, less comprehensive and less elaborate Code of Cao Wei (Cao Wei Lu, 220–265) and the Code of Western Jin (Xi Jin Lu, 265–317) promulgated almost four centuries earlier in 268.

Confucian attitudes place low reliance on law and punishment for maintaining social order. Evidence of this can be found in the Aspiration (Zhi) section of the 200-volume Old Book on Tang (Jiu Tang Shu), a magnum opus of Tang historiography. The history classic was compiled under official supervision in 945 during the Late Jin dynasty (Hou Jin, 936–946) of the era of Five Generations (Wudai, 907–960), some three centuries after the actual events. A single chapter on Punishment and Law (Xingfa) is placed last after seven chapters on Rites (Liyi), after which come four chapters on Music (Yinyue), three chapters on the Calendar (Li), two on Astronomy and Astrology (Tianwen), one on Physics (Wuheng), four on Geography (Dili), three on Hierarchy of Office (Zhiguan), one on Carriages and Costume (Yufu), two on Sutras and Books (Jingji), and two on Commodities (Chihuo), in that order.

The Confucian Code of Rites (Liji), not law, is expected to be the controlling document on civilised behaviour. In the Confucian world view, rule of law is applied only to those who have fallen beyond the bounds of civilised behaviour. Civilised people are expected to observe proper rites. Only social outcasts are expected to have their actions controlled by law. Thus the rule of law is considered a state of barbaric primitiveness, prior to achieving the civilised state of voluntary observation of proper rites. What is legal is not necessarily moral or just.

Under the supervision of Tang Confucian minister Fang Xuanling, 500 sections of ancient laws were compiled into 12 volumes in the Tang Code, titled:

Vol 1: Terms and Examples (Mingli)
Vol 2: Security and Forbiddance (Weijin)
Vol 3: Office and Hierarchy (Zhizhi)
Vol 4: Domestic Matters and Marriage (Huhun)
Vol 5: Stables and Storage (Jiuku)
Vol 6: Impeachment and Promotion (Shanxing)
Vol 7: Thievery and Robbery (Zeidao)
Vol 8: Contest and Litigation (Dousong)
Vol 9: Deceit and Falsehood (Zhawei)
Vol 10: Miscellaneous Regulation (Zalu)
Vol 11: Arrest and Escape (Buwang)
Vol 12: Judgment and Imprisonment (Duanyu)

The Tang Code lists the five forms of corporal punishment for serfs as:

1. Flogging (Chinese: 笞; pinyin: chī)
2. Caning (Chinese: 杖; pinyin: zhàng)
3. Imprisonment (Chinese: 徒; pinyin: tú)
4. Exile (Chinese: 流; pinyin: liú)
5. Death (Chinese: 死; pinyin: sǐ)

Leniency is applied according to the Eight Deliberations:

1. Blood relation
2. Motive for the crime
3. Virtue of the culprit
4. Ability of the culprit
5. Past merits
6. Nobility status
7. Friendship
8. Diligent character

Confucianism in its revised form (Neo-Confucianism) continued to be the state orthodoxy under the Song, Ming and Qing dynasties. This ensured that the Confucian foundations of the Tang code were retained, and in some respects they were even strengthened. By the time of the Qing dynasty however, the mass of legislation had increased to such an extent that it was doubtful whether even officials could adequately master the complex distinctions it came to contain.

== Varieties of law ==
Traditional Chinese law can be divided into the "official" law and "unofficial law". The "official law" emanates from the authority of the emperor. The doctrine of separation of powers was unknown in China until the 20th century. In particular, judicial and administrative functions were performed by magistrates rather than by separate persons. The emperor delegated many of his administrative and judicial powers to his officials while reserving for himself the legislative function.

Official law may itself be divided into two main components: penal law and administrative law. The former prescribed punishments for certain behaviour, and the latter defined the duties of the officials.

By contrast, "unofficial" law was the customary law of the people, rules that developed in localities or in merchant guilds for the handling of matters of common concern. Neither of the standard words for law – fa (法) or lü (律) – was ever applied to rules of this kind.

Of these varieties only penal law has been systematically studied by Western scholars. The complexity of the Chinese administrative system has made it difficult for Western students to acquire a general familiarity with the legal principles that govern it. The study of unofficial law has also been limited due in part to the fact that the data are contained in such a variety of source materials, most extremely difficult to access. The lack of access to source material gave earlier scholars, both Chinese and Western, the mistaken impression that Imperial China did not have a system of civil law.

=== Penal law ===
The centrepiece of the penal law is the "code of punishments" issued by each dynasty at its inception. Although fragments of laws survive from the Qin and Han, the first surviving complete code was the Kaihuang Code developed during the Sui dynasty and adopted by later dynasties including the Tang in 653. This code provided the model for all the later traditional penal codes through its definition of the Five Punishments and Ten Abominations. Only the Mongol Yuan dynasty failed to issue a penal code, but the collections of legal materials from that dynasty still show the strong influence of the Tang code.

The penal codes contain only rules that prescribe punishments for specific offences, rules that define generally the allocation of punishment, or those that establish principles of interpretation. Each offence was allocated a specific punishment. The task of the magistrate was to identify the proper name of the offence disclosed by the facts. Determination of the correct punishment automatically followed.

The penal code was seen as indispensable part of government rules, yet punishments were still to be humane. The mutilating punishments that had characterised earlier law were no longer used by the 8th century. The five regular punishments established by the Tang code were, in descending order of severity: death, life exile, penal servitude (forced labour), beating with a heavy stick, or beating with a light stick. They remained the regular punishments until the closing years of the Qing.

The penal codes were divided into a "General Principles" and a "Specific Offences" section. Each dynasty retained the same basic content, though the Ming and Qing codes introduced some variation in the classification of offences. The Tang and Song codes consisted of a number of articles (律), many of which were adopted, sometimes without alteration, by the Ming and Qing codes. Once the articles of the code had been established at the beginning of the dynasty, there was a reluctance on the part of the founding emperor or his successors to change them.

Consequently, to deal with the problem of changing circumstances, the Ming started the practice of adding sub-statutes (例) to the code. The practice grew extensively under the Qing, with the result that, by the end of the 19th century, the penal code had lost something of its internal coherence and become an unwieldy instrument. Sub-statutes tended to be more specific and detailed than articles. Explanatory commentaries were added to the penal codes. The most authoritative were those approved by the throne for inclusion in the code. These often themselves contained rules not found in the articles or sub-statutes. In cases where no ambiguous article or sub-statute could be invoked, previous decisions by the Board of Punishments might function as "precedents".

Some rules in the penal codes, especially those relating to civil matters, were obsolete or not enforced. Jean Escarra, has suggested that the penal law as a whole was intended to function as a guide to model conduct and not as a set of enforceable rules. Whilst this view has largely been rejected, it is clear that many of the enforced rules on family relationships were retained on account of their symbolic value.

After the Han period, all rules of a code which were not lü were called ling (ordinances) and ge (rulings), sometimes shi (models), and often zhi (decrees).

=== Administrative law ===
Administrative law was well developed in China very early; most of its basic framework being laid by the Zhou dynasty. In the administrative structure, the emperor was supreme and hence above the law. He could make the law, override existing laws, and upset administrative decisions taken in his name. Yet, although autocratic, the very existence of the complex bureaucratic machinery constituted a check on his arbitrary exercise of power.

On occasion he might modify a capital sentence referred to him by the central judicial agencies for his approval, but he always did so with reference to the facts of the particular case and explained in his edict the reasons for the change he had made. Sometimes he would even accept a remonstrance by his officials that the change was not proper and accept that he had to act in conformity with the existing law.

=== Civil law ===
Customary law, dealt with what in the West is termed private law or civil law. In particular, it comprises rules governing matters of contract and property. In contrast with Western systems in which civil law preceded criminal law, in traditional Chinese law, the reverse was true. From the provisions of the penal code, magistrates could either derive principles of civil law either directly, if a matter was stated in the penal code (such as matters regarding debt and usury, dealings with land, the borrowing and pledging of property, and the sale of goods in markets), or indirectly reading into a criminal statute a basis for a private civil suit.

Although the stereotypical view of Chinese magistrates was that they were reluctant to intervene as arbiters in any kind of civil dispute, more recent studies have argued that most of a magistrate's work involved the settlement of civil disputes. In this view, the reluctance of magistrates to take on case work had to do largely with the fact that the Chinese civil administration was small, and that the workload on magistrates was very large. Moreover, scholars in the early 21st century, such as Philip Huang (黃宗智), have argued that the traditional Chinese system of justice was fair, efficient, and frequently used in the settlement of disputes.

Use of property was divided into topsoil (tianpi) and subsoil (tiangu) rights. Landlords with subsoil rights had a permanent claim to the property if they paid taxes and received official seals from the government, but did not have rights to actively use the land. Instead, those with topsoil rights paid the subsoil landlord a fixed rent (or part of the proceeds of what was produced on the land) for not only the right to farm and live on the land, but the right to independently sell or lease the topsoil rights to another party. So as long as another party held topsoil rights, the party holding subsoil did not have right to actively use the land or evict the topsoil owner. Land, like other forms of property, was seen as being held collectively by the family and not individuals within the family. Another concept in imperial Chinese property rights was dianmai (典賣/典卖), more commonly known as huomai (活賣/活卖), or conditional sales of property that allowed the seller (i.e., his family) to buy back the land at the original price (without interest). The assumption was that land, having been held by a family for generations, should stay with the same family. From the Sui dynasty onwards, women could not hold property directly and, for land to stay in the same family, it had to pass between male heirs following the rule of primogeniture.

== Procedure ==
Suspects and criminals were arrested by the county police or the posthouse chiefs who were subordinate to the county chief of police. One important principle of traditional Chinese law was that a person could not be convicted of a crime without a confession. Because a confession was required for a conviction and sentence, torture was often used to elicit such a confession. A common tool was the bastinado, applied to the buttocks and thighs.

During the Qin and Han, local magistrates were fully authorised to apply the full scale of punishments, including the death penalty.

In principle all criminal cases, whatever their gravity, were heard first in the court of the district in which the facts occurred. The magistrate investigated the facts, determined guilt or innocence, and then proposed the sentence for the offence as prescribed by the code. Whenever a sentence of greater severity than a beating was applicable, it was necessary to forward the case to the next superior court in the hierarchy, that of the prefect, for rehearing. The prefect's decision was final only in cases of penal servitude. Cases of exile or death were automatically reviewed by the provincial governor. All homicide cases and all cases attracting the death sentence were sent to the capital for review by the highest judicial tribunal, the Board of Punishments. No sentence of death could be implemented, except in extreme circumstances, without express approval from the emperor himself.

== Moral values and the law ==
In contrast to the Legalists, the Confucian view of law was always centred on morality. Xun Zi, an early Confucian thinker, saw the necessity for legislation, but emphasised equally the importance of virtue on the part of the legislator and judiciary. There was a conviction that maintenance of the Confucian moral prescriptions through the apparatus of the state was essential for the preservation of a civilised society. Encouragement of the virtue of filial piety helped to strengthen the related duty of respect and submission to imperial authority.

The codes signal their moral orientation by placing right at the beginning of the "General Principles" section a description of the offences known as the "Ten Abominations". These offences were regarded as the most abhorrent. As the official commentary of the Qing code states: "persons guilty of any of the Ten Abominations destroy human bonds (倫), rebel against Heaven (天), go against reason (理), and violate justice (義)."

== See also ==
- Comparative law
- Chinese law
- Five Punishments
- Great Qing Legal Code
- Law of the People's Republic of China
- Law of Taiwan
- List of ancient legal codes
- Religious law
- Ten Abominations

== Early Chinese law ==
- Hulsewé, Anthony F. P. "The Legalist and the laws of Ch'in," Leyden studies in Sinology, ed. W. L. Idema. Leiden: E. J. Brill, 1981.
- Hulsewé, Anthony F. P. Remnants of Han Law. Vol. 1. Leiden: E.J. Brill, 1955
- Hulsewé, Anthony F. P. Remnants of Ch'in Law: An annotated translation of the Ch'in legal and administrative rules of the 3rd century B.C. discovered in Yünmeng Prefecture, Hu-pei Province in 1975. Vol. 1. Leiden: E.J. Brill, 1985
- Uchida Tomoo (內田智雄), Kanjo keishō shi (漢書刑法志). Kyoto: Dōshishia University, 1958. .
