= Tang Code =

7th-10th century Chinese penal code

- Chinese: 唐律
Transcriptions
Standard Mandarin
- Hanyu Pinyin: Táng lǜ
- Wade–Giles: T'ang2 lü4
- IPA: [tʰǎŋ lŷ]
Yue: Cantonese
- Jyutping: Tong4 leot6
- IPA: [tʰɔŋ˩ lɵt̚˨]

The Tang Code (Chinese: 唐律; pinyin: Táng lǜ; Wade–Giles: T'ang^{2} lü^{4}) was a penal code that was established and used during the Tang dynasty in China. Supplemented by civil statutes and regulations, it became the basis for later dynastic codes not only in China but elsewhere in East Asia. The Code synthesized Legalist and Confucian interpretations of law. Created in AD 624 and modified in AD 627 and 637, it was promulgated in AD 652 with 502 articles in 12 sections and enhanced with a commentary (the Tánglǜ shūyì 唐律疏議) in 653. Considered one of the greatest achievements of traditional Chinese law, the Tang Code is also the earliest Chinese code to have been transmitted to the present in its complete form.

== Origin and context ==
The Tang code took its roots in the code of the Northern Zhou (564) dynasty, which was itself based on the earlier codes of the Cao-Wei and Western Jin (268). Aiming to smooth the earlier laws and reduce physical punishments (such as mutilations) in order to appease social tensions in the newly pacified Tang territories, it was created in AD 624 at the request of Emperor Gaozu of Tang. After further revisions in 627 and 637 under the influence of Emperor Taizong, the code was completed by commentaries in 653, under Gaozong.

== Organization and system of punishments ==
Tang Code
Section	Name
I	General definitions and rules
II	Laws relating to passing into or through forbidden places (imperial palaces, town gates, walls, frontier posts)
III	Offences committed by officials in the exercise of their functions
IV	Laws concerning peasant families (lands, taxes, marriages)
V	Laws related to state stud-farms and storehouses
VI	Laws relating to the raising of troops
VII	Offences against the person and against property
VIII	Offences committed in the course of brawls
IX	Forgery and counterfeiting
X	Various laws of a special character
XI	Laws concerning the apprehension of guilty persons
XII	Laws relating to the administration of justice

French historian and sinologist Jacques Gernet has called the Tang Code "an admirable composition of faultless logic in spite of its size and complexity." The American sinologists Wallace Johnson and Denis Twitchett described it as "a very rational system of justice" in which "both the accuser and the officials involved had to be careful lest they themselves face punishment". The Tang Code contained more than 500 articles divided into twelve large sections (see right-side table).

The penalty for an offence was determined according to two factors:

- Offence : The Tang Code clearly associated each offence with a penalty.
- Relational position : For relatives, this position was measured by the kind and duration of mourning that had to be observed for each degree of kinship. Relations outside the family were defined by positions within the social hierarchy, capped by the emperor himself. In this hierarchy, officials were higher than ordinary men, who were themselves superior to persons of servile status. For instance, a slave committing a crime against his master was punished more severely than if an ordinary person had committed the same crime. The same offence committed by the master against his slave, on the other hand, resulted in a lower penalty than the same crime committed by a common person.

The local magistrate acted as examiner and sometimes as investigator, but his final role in legal cases was to determine the proper penalty for the offense that had been committed: he had to fix the nature of the offense as defined by the code, and to increase or reduce the associated penalty depending on the social relation between offender and victim.

The historically famous wuting 五聽 'five hearings' was a Chinese technique for eliciting the facts of a case. While questioning a witness, the magistrate would look closely for five kinds of behavior: "the person's statements, expression, breathing, reaction to the words of the judge, and eyes. Through careful observation, it was thought that the experienced magistrate could arrive at a knowledge of whether the person was, in fact, telling the truth."

If a magistrate was unable to decide a case on the basis of evidence and witness testimony, he could seek the permission of higher officials to use judicial torture. The accused could be beaten no more than 200 blows in up to three interrogations held at least twenty days apart. But when the accused was able to withstand the full amount of torture without making a confession, the magistrate would use the same torture on the accuser. If the tortured accuser admitted making a false accusation, he would receive the same punishment that would have been inflicted upon the accused had the latter been convicted.

The offence modulated according to the degree of social relation determined the final penalty, which could range from flagellation using a rattan and bastinado with a bamboo stick, to penal labour, exile with penal labour, and death by strangulation (garrote) or decapitation.

== Facts ==
- The code imposed two years of forced labor on any private household found in possession of such works as the Luoshu Square or the Yellow River Map, which are used in Yijing and feng shui divination. The practice was preserved in the legal practice until the Song dynasty.
- Specific rules governed the application of judicial torture. The only instrument permitted was the xunqiuzhang 訊囚杖 'interrogation stick', which was approximately 40 inches (101.6 centimetres) long and .32 in (0.8 cm) and .22 inches (0.6 centimetres) wide at the large and small ends respectively. The magistrate himself would be punished if other means were used to try to force a confession.

== See also ==
- Great Qing Legal Code

== Bibliography ==
- Gernet, Jacques (1996), A History of Chinese Civilization (Second ed.), Cambridge, England: Cambridge University Press, pp. 801 pages, ISBN 9780521497817 Originally published in French as Le monde chinois.
- Johnson, Wallace, trans. (1979), The Tang Code: Volume One: General Principles. Princeton: Princeton University Press.
- Johnson, Wallace and Denis Twitchett (1993), "Criminal Procedure in T'ang China", Asia Major 3rd series, 6.2, 113–146.
