= Five Punishments =

Name for the physical penalties of the dynastic Chinese legal system

The Five Punishments (Chinese: 五刑; pinyin: wǔ xíng; Cantonese Yale: ńgh yìhng) was the collective name for a series of physical penalties meted out by the legal system of pre-modern dynastic China. Over time, the nature of the Five Punishments varied. Before the Western Han dynasty Emperor Han Wendi (r. 180–157 BC), the punishments involved tattooing, cutting off the nose, amputation of one or both feet, castration, and death. Following the Sui and Tang dynasties (581–907 AD), these were changed to penal servitude, banishment, death, or corporal punishment in the form of whipping with bamboo strips or flogging with a stick. Although the Five Punishments were an important part of Dynastic China's penal system, they were not the only methods of punishment used.

== Origin ==
The earliest users of the Five Punishments are believed by some to be the Sanmiao Clan (三苗氏). Other sources claim they originated with Chiyou, the legendary creator of metalwork and weapons and leader of the ancient Nine Li (九黎) ethnic group. During the subsequent Xia dynasty (c. 2070 BC – c. 1600 BC), Qi of Xia, son of Yu the Great, the dynasty's founder, adopted the Miao's punishments of amputation of one or both feet (刖; yuè), cutting off of the nose (劓; yì), chiseling (琢; zhuó), tattooing the face or forehead (黥; qíng) and other types of punishment. Tattooing, amputation of the nose or feet, removal of the reproductive organs and death became the main five forms of the punishment system during this period. From the Xia Dynasty onwards through the Shang dynasty (1600–1046 BC) and the Zhou dynasty (1046–256 BC). The "Five Punishments for Slaves" were abolished during the reign of Emperor Wen of Han following a petition from a female subject Chunyu Tiying (淳于緹縈), and were replaced by the "Five Punishments for Serfs".

== In ancient China ==
Apart from the death penalty, the remaining four Punishments for Slaves were designed to bring about damage to their bodies that would mark them for life. All ordinary citizens were subject to these punishments. These punishments were for men. The number of crimes to which the punishment was applicable is listed next to each one.

- Mò (墨), also known as qíng (黥), where the offender would be tattooed on the face or forehead with indelible ink.
- Yì (劓), where the offender's nose was cut off without anesthesia.
- Yuè (刖), also known as bìn (臏) during the Xia dynasty and zhǎnzhǐ (斬趾) during the Qin dynasty, involved amputation of the left or right foot or both. Other sources claim that this punishment involved removal of the kneecap, which is claimed to be where the name of Sun Bin, a Warring States period military strategist, comes from. A recent study of a female skeleton found in 1999 revealed her to be the oldest corpse found with evidence of yuè.
- Gōng (宮), also known as yínxíng (淫刑), fǔxíng (腐刑) or cánshì xíng (蠶室刑), where the male offender's reproductive organs were removed. The penis was removed and testicles were cut off (emasculation), and the offender was sentenced to work as an eunuch in the Imperial palace. Gōng for men was applied to the same crime as Gōngxing for women, namely adultery, licentious or promiscuous activity.
- Dà Pì (大辟), the death sentence. Methods of execution were quartering, or cutting the body into four pieces (分為戮; fēn wéi lù); boiling alive (烹; pēng); tearing off an offender's head and four limbs by attaching them to chariots (車裂; chēliè); beheading (梟首; xiāoshǒu); execution then abandonment of the offender's body in the local public market (棄市; qìshì); strangulation (絞; jiǎo); and slow slicing (凌遲; língchí). Other methods of execution were also used.

== In Imperial China ==
During the Western Han dynasty, tattooing and amputation were abolished as punishments and in subsequent dynasties, the five punishments underwent further modification. By the Sui dynasty, the five punishments had attained the basic form they would have until the end of the imperial era. This is a brief survey of the five punishments during the Qing dynasty:

- Chī (笞), beating on the buttocks with a light bamboo cane. During the Qing dynasty (1644–1911), bamboo clappers were used instead. There were five degrees of chī:
  - 10 lashes (remitted on payment of 600 wén (文) in copper cash)
  - 20 lashes (remitted on payment of 1 guàn (貫) and 200 wén in copper cash. 1 guàn equals 1000 wén)
  - 30 lashes (remitted on payment of 1 guàn and 800 wén in copper cash)
  - 40 lashes (remitted on payment of 2 guàn and 400 wén in copper cash)
  - 50 lashes (remitted on payment of 3 guàn in copper cash)
- Zhàng (杖), beating with a large stick on either the back, buttocks or legs. The five degrees of zhàng were:
  - 60 strokes (remitted on payment of 3 guàn and 600 wén in copper cash)
  - 70 strokes (remitted on payment of 4 guàn and 200 wén in copper cash)
  - 80 strokes (remitted on payment of 4 guàn and 800 wén in copper cash)
  - 90 strokes (remitted on payment of 5 guàn and 400 wén in copper cash)
  - 100 strokes (remitted on payment of 6 guàn of copper cash)
- Tú (徒), compulsory penal servitude with five degrees of severity:
  - One year of penal servitude plus 60 strokes of the large stick (remitted on payment of 12 guàn in copper cash)
  - One and a half years of penal servitude plus 70 strokes of the large stick (remitted on payment of 15 guàn in copper cash)
  - Two years of penal servitude plus 80 strokes of the large stick (remitted on payment of 18 guàn in copper cash)
  - Two and a half years of penal servitude plus 90 strokes of the large stick (remitted on payment of 21 guàn in copper cash)
  - Three years of penal servitude plus 100 strokes of the large stick (remitted on payment of 24 guàn in copper cash)
- Liú (流), exile to a remote location (such as Hainan) with return to one's place of birth being forbidden. There were three degrees of severity:
  - 2000 lĭ (里) (1000km, 620 miles) plus 100 strokes of the large stick (remitted on payment of 30 guàn in copper cash)
  - 2,500 lǐ (1250km, 775 miles) plus 100 strokes of the large stick (remitted on payment of 33 guàn in copper cash)
  - 3,000 lǐ (1500km, 930 miles) plus 100 strokes of the large stick (remitted on payment of 36 guàn in copper cash)
- Sĭ (死), death penalty. Following the Sui and Tang dynasties there were generally two options: hanging (絞; jiǎo) or decapitation (斬; zhǎn). From the Song dynasty (970–1279 AD) onwards, slow slicing (凌遲; língchí) along with beheading (梟首; xiāoshŏu) were also used. The death penalty could be remitted on payment of 42 guàn in copper cash.

The scale of the remittance payments can be gauged from the fact that at the era of the Qianlong Emperor (1735–1796), the average wage of a construction laborer in Zhili (modern day Hebei) Province was 0.72 wén or 0.6 troy ounces of silver per day. It takes 160 years of wage from such a worker to pay for remittance of a death sentence.

The following punishments were applied to women for the same crimes as committed by men:

- Xíngchōng (刑舂), where the offender was forced to grind grain
- Zǎnxíng (拶刑), also known as zǎnzhĭ (拶指), squeezing of the fingers between sticks
- Zhàngxíng (杖刑), beating with wooden staves
- Cìsǐ (賜死), forced suicide
- Gōngxíng (宮刑), sequestration or confinement to a room. Punishment for licentiousness or adultery. Gōngxing for women was applied for the same crimes as the gōng punishment for men.

== See also ==
- Traditional Chinese law
- Ti Ying, girl who persuaded Emperor Wen of Han to abolish the Five Punishments.
