= Brodequin (torture) =

Medieval torture device

The brodequin was an instrument of torture used during the Middle Ages.

The victim would be secured to a stout bench in a sitting position. His bare legs were sandwiched within a set of three strong, narrow vertical boards, outside each leg and between, the lot tightly bound together with strong rope. Wedges of wood were introduced into any available gaps and slowly pounded down with a mallet, squeezing the legs with enough pressure to shatter bones and leak both blood and marrow. For so-called ordinary offenses, the torture was conducted with four wedges, while eight wedges tortured the legs of extreme felons.
