= Ten Abominations =

List of despicable offenses under traditional Chinese law

The Ten Abominations (simplified Chinese: 十恶; traditional Chinese: 十惡; pinyin: Shí'è) were a list of offenses under traditional Chinese law that were regarded as the most abhorrent, regarded as ultimate threat to civilized society. They are listed below. The first three were capital offences:

1. Plotting rebellion (谋反; 謀反; Móufǎn): to overthrow the current regime.
2. Plotting sedition (谋大逆; 謀大逆; Móudànì): to damage or destroy imperial temples, imperial burial mounds, or imperial palaces. The ancient Chinese belief in feng shui equated intentional damaging of imperial property with casting a curse on the ruler.
3. Plotting treason (谋叛; 謀叛; Móupàn): to defect to an enemy state, usually carrying national secrets.
4. Parricide (恶逆; 惡逆; Ènì): to murder one's own parents, grandparents or elders; to murder one's husband's parents, grandparents or elders.
5. Depravity (不道; Bùdào): to murder three or more innocent people; to desecrate a victim's body after committing a murder; to produce gu and use it to cast curses.
6. Great irreverence (大不敬; Dàbùjìng): lèse-majesté; to show disrespect to the emperor or his family.
7. Lack of filial piety (不孝; Bùxiào): to maltreat one's parents or grandparents, or to procure entertainment during periods of mourning (up to three years after the death of one's parents).
8. Discord (不睦; Bùmù): to harm or sue one's husband or elders.
9. Unrighteousness (不义; 不義; Bùyì): petty treason; to murder one's mentor, superiors or government officials.
10. Incest (内乱; 內亂; Nèiluàn): actually defined as having affairs with the wives or concubines of one's father, grandfather, or other elder male relatives.

During the Ming dynasty, imperial privileges, such as the Eight Deliberations, were not applicable to the Ten Abominations due to their seriousness.
