= Chinese law =

Chinese law is one of the oldest legal traditions in the world. The core of modern Chinese law is based on Germanic-style civil law, socialist law, and traditional Chinese approaches. For most of the history of China, its legal system has been based on the Confucian philosophy of social control through moral education, as well as the Legalist emphasis on codified law and criminal sanction. Following the Xinhai Revolution, the Republic of China adopted a largely Western-style legal code in the civil law tradition (specifically German and Swiss based). The establishment of the People's Republic of China in 1949 brought with it a more Soviet-influenced system of socialist law. However, earlier traditions from Chinese history have retained their influence.

== Jurisprudence ==
=== Confucianism and Legalism ===
Confucianism and Legalism were developed during the Spring and Autumn period and the Warring States period, a time that saw the most impressive proliferation of new ideas and philosophies in Chinese history. While both theories call for governmental hierarchy, they differ drastically in their views of human potential and the preferred means to achieve political order. Both have influenced and continue to influence the development of cultural, social, and legal norms in China.

==== Confucianism ====
Confucianism is the idea that human beings are fundamentally good. With this optimistic view on human potential, Confucius advocates for ruling through li – traditional customs, mores, and norms – which allow people to have a sense of shame and become humane people with good character, rather than through government regulations and penal law. The goal is that people will internalize the acceptable norms and only take proper actions. This will not only lead to a harmonious social order, but it will also provide the additional benefit of improving an individual's inner character and the overall quality of the society. In contrast, codified laws require external compliance, and people may abide by the laws without fully understanding the reason for compliance. Confucius did not advocate for the elimination of formal laws. Rather, according to Confucianism, law should be viewed as a subsidiary tool primarily to be used against determined wrongdoers who cannot be affected by moral instruction.

What lies vital to Confucius' theory is the willing participation by citizens of the society to search for commonly accepted, cooperative solutions. There must also be grounds or bases upon which commonly acceptable solutions can be arrived at. Li is commonly understood as a set of culturally and socially valued norms that provide guidance to proper behaviors that will ultimately lead to a harmonious society. These norms are not fixed or unchangeable over time but rather a reflection of what is accepted at a particular time in a particular context. When conflicts arise, the li have to be applied and interpreted to produce a just result and restore the harmony of the society. However, in the absence of any procedural safeguard afforded by codified laws, interpretation of li is subject to abuse.

Recognizing that people in a society hold diverse interests, Confucius charges the ruler with the responsibility to unify these interests and maintain social order. This is not done by dictatorship but by setting an example. Therefore, a ruler needs not to force his people to behave properly. Instead, the ruler needs only to make himself respectful, and the people will be induced and enlightened by his superior virtues to follow his example. The ruler must know and understand the li to be able to create solutions to conflict and problems the society faces. As the people are to follow the moral standards and example set by the ruler, to a large extent, the quality of the ruler determines the quality of the political order.

Although discourse in Confucianism considered law as an inferior means of control when compared to morality and ritual, law in Confucian China was in practice overwhelmingly penal.

The incorporation of the essentials of Confucianist li into legal codes occurred with this Confucian conception dominating ancient Chinese law. Ch'ü concludes that the gradual process of Confucianisation of law was the most significant development in the legal system of China prior to 20th century modernization. The line between ruling by moral influence and ruling by punishment was not always clearly delineated. For example, li could be enforced by moral influence and legal means. The metamorphosis of li into law depended on its widespread and unvaried acceptance by society.

Although the codification of law was largely completed by the Tang Code of CE 624, throughout the centuries the Confucian foundations of the Tang Code were retained, and indeed with some aspects of it strengthened by the later dynasties. The Great Ming Code, which was a model for the Qing code, covered every part of social and political life, especially family and ritual, but also foreign relations and even relations of earthly life with the cosmos.

The Confucian notion that morality and self-discipline was more important than legal codes caused many historians, such as Max Weber, until the mid-20th century to conclude that law was not an important part of Imperial Chinese society. This notion, however, has come under extreme criticism and is no longer the conventional wisdom among Sinologists, who have concluded that Imperial China had an elaborate system of both criminal and civil law which was comparable to anything found in Europe.

==== Legalism ====
Legalism advocated the utilization of codified laws and harsh punishment to achieve social order. This is due to the legalists' belief that all human beings are born evil and self-interested. People, when left unrestrained, would engage in selfish behavior which will undoubtedly lead to social unrest. Legalists believe that the way to have cure this defect and force people to behave morally is to publicly enact clearly written laws and impose harsh punishments.

The legalists designed a system in which the law is run by the state because the abilities of rulers are often limited and the reliance on the ruler's ability and judgment often leads to adverse results. This ensured that the laws will be applied impartially without the interference of personal bias of the ruler or ones who are responsible for applying the laws. It also makes it irrelevant whether the ruler has superior abilities. This non-action promoted by the legalists is their understanding of the concept of wuwei, which is different from the Confucians' understanding of the same concept.

Legalism is subject to the same type of abuse seen in Confucianism. The Qin emperor implemented strict laws and harsh punishments with no nuance for level of crime. He burned books and buried alive people with different ideals. The Qin emperor instilled fear for the law into the minds of his people. His harshness led to his demise after 14 years of reigning over China.

==== Comparison ====
Both Confucianism and Legalism were developed in a period of turmoil and both were aimed at the re-unification of the country, the two theories went opposite directions with one advocating for and one against the use of formal laws to achieve social order. What the two theories have in common is their concession of the ultimate authority to the ruler, who remained above and beyond the li or law. It is true that neither theory is ideal in achieving a social order. Nevertheless, both theories have had a significant impact on the cultural and legal development in China, and their influence remains visible today.

=== Legal rights ===
The modern idea of legal rights was introduced to China from the West in the 19th century. Its translation as quánlì (权利) was coined by William Alexander Parsons Martin in 1864, in his translation of Henry Wheaton's Elements of International Law.

=== Rule of law ===
One of the most commonly used phrases in contemporary China, by legal scholars and politicians alike, is fǎzhì (法治). Fǎzhì can be translated into English as "rule of law", but questions have often been asked whether Chinese leaders meant "rule by law", which means the instrumental use of laws by rulers to facilitate social control and to impose punishment as understood in the Legalist tradition.

Late Qing dynasty legal reforms sought to implement Western legal principles including the rule of law and judicial independence. Judicial independence further decreased under Chiang Kai-shek per the Kuomintang's policy of particization (danghua) under which administrative judges were required to have "deep comprehension" of the KMT's principles.

After China's Reform and Opening Up, the CCP emphasized the rule of law as a basic strategy and method for state management. The concepts of yīfǎ zhìguó (依法治国: "governing the nation according to the rule of law") and jiànshè shèhuì zhǔyì fǎzhì guójiā (建设社会主义法制国家: "building a socialist rule of law state") have been part of the CCP's official policy since the mid-1990s. Jiang Zemin called for establishing a socialist rule of law at the Fifteenth Party Congress in 1997. "Building a socialist rule of law state" has been CCP policy since the 1990s.

The existence of the rule of law in China has been widely debated. When discussing Chinese law, it is worth noting that various expressions have been used, including "strengthening the law," "tightening up the legal system," "abiding by the law in administration," "rule by law," and the "rule of law". Different shades of meanings have been attached to each of these terms, but Chinese officials and scholars have employed the expressions rather loosely and sometimes interchangeably. However, the central government had originally preferred the expression, "strengthening the law/legal system" to "the rule of law". It was thought that the latter might give a controversial connotation of the instrumentality, while the former conveyed a straightforward meaning of strengthening the law and institutions. "Strengthening the law" meant reform of legislation and enforcement of laws.

Despite the newly elevated role of courts in Chinese society, there still remains some consensus about defects in China's legal system in regards to progressing towards the rule of law. Scholars point to the following defects as slowing movement toward rule of law. These include:

- First, the National People's Congress is ineffective at executing its constitutional duty to legislate and supervise the government.
- Second, the Chinese Constitution is not treated as the supreme law, nor is it enforced.
- Third, the judiciary is not independent from political pressure. On the other hand, direct intervention in particular cases by the Chinese Communist Party has lessened in recent years, as has the direct influence of the party on the legislative process.
- Fourth, there is a high level of corruption among public officials. Personal favors, bribery, and taking of public monies are all too common at all levels of government.
- Finally, the legal profession is inadequate for lack of qualified attorneys and judges. This failure is being remedied by legislation aimed at instituting higher educational standards for judges, opening more courts and law schools throughout China.

==== Xi Jinping ====
In 2014, the CCP formally adopted a policy of constructing a "socialist rule of law with Chinese characteristics." CCP general secretary Xi Jinping describes the leadership of the CCP as essential to upholding the socialist rule of law. In his view, "The Party leads the People to enact and enforce the laws" and it "must lead the legislation, guarantee the law enforcement, and become the leader in conforming the law." Xi states that the two fundamental aspects of the socialist rule of law are: (1) that the political and legal organs (including courts, the police, and the procuratorate) must believe in the law and uphold the law, and (2) all political and legal officials must follow the CCP. Notions of judicial independence and separation of powers are labeled "Western erroneous views." Xi's view of the rule of law tends to equate the rule of law with the development of legislation. In his writings on socialist rule of law, Xi has emphasized traditional Chinese concepts including people as the root of the state (mingben), "the ideal of no lawsuit" (tianxia wusong), "respecting rite and stressing law" (longli zhongfa), "virtue first, penalty second" (dezhu xingfu), and "promoting virtue and being prudent in punishment" (mingde shenfa).

According to academic Keyu Jin, the revised Administrative Procedures Law codified in 2021 marks a milestone in formalizing the rule of law in China.

==== Analysis ====
Academic Randall Peerenboom contends that two major historical doctrines have limited the growth of rule of law in China. First, Confucianism, because it emphasizes moral education rather than law to regulate the behavior of the sovereign and the subjects. Second, Legalism, because Peerenbloom deems its emphasis on harsh punishment a focus on rule by law rather than rule of law. Peerenbloom writes that this traditions contribute to the personalistic and centralized trends in the history of governance in China.

==== International ranking ====
China's ranking in the World Bank's Worldwide Governance Indicator "Rule of Law score" improved from the 35th percentile in 2012 at the beginning of Xi's tenure to the 53rd percentile in 2023.

== History ==
The word for law in classical Chinese is fǎ (法), which denotes a meaning of "fair", "straight" and "just", derived from its water radical (氵). It also carries the sense of "standard, measurement, and model". Derk Bodde and Clarence Morris held that the concept of fǎ had an association with yì (義: "social rightness"). Yan Fu, in his Chinese translation of Montesquieu's De l'esprit des lois published in 1913, warned his readers about the difference between the Chinese fǎ and Western law: "The word 'law' in Western languages has four different interpretations in Chinese as in lǐ (理: "order"), lǐ (禮: "rites", "decorum"), fǎ (法: "human laws") and zhì (制: "control").

A term which preceded fǎ was xíng (刑), which originally probably referred to decapitation. Xíng later evolved to be a general term for laws that related to criminal punishment. The early history Shang Shu recorded the earliest forms of the "five penalties": tattooing, disfigurement, castration, mutilation, and death. Once written law came into existence, the meaning of xíng was extended to include not only punishments but also any state prohibitions whose violation would result in punishments. In modern times, xíng denotes penal law or criminal law. An example of the classical use of xíng is Xíng Bù (刑部, lit. "Department of Punishment") for the legal or justice department in imperial China.

=== Traditional Chinese law ===
Unlike many other major civilizations where written law was often associated with the divine, law in early China was viewed in purely secular terms. The emergence of the criminal law was initially greeted with hostility by Confucian thinkers as indicative of serious moral decline, a violation of human morality, and a disturbance of the cosmological order. Historically, awareness and acceptance of ethical norms by the early Chinese were shaped far more by the pervasive influence of custom and moral education than by any formally enacted system of law. Early emperors embraced the Legalist ideal as a way of exerting control over their large, growing territory and population. This process was integrated with traditional Chinese beliefs in the cosmic order. Behavior fitting within the responses set by fǎ was the correct behavior. Xíng states the potential costs to the individual of exceeding them and imposes penalties for these actions.

=== Han dynasty (202 BC–220 AD) ===
The Han dynasty retained the basic legal system established under the Qin but modified some of the harsher aspects in line with the Confucian philosophy of social control. The Han dynasty formally recognized four sources of law: lǜ (律: "codified laws"), lìng (令: "the emperor's order"), kē (科: "statutes inherited from previous dynasties") and bǐ (比: "precedents"), among which lìng has the highest binding power over the other three. Most legal professionals were not lawyers but generalists trained in philosophy and literature. The local, classically trained, Confucian gentry played a crucial role as arbiters and handled all but the most serious local disputes.

=== Qing dynasty (1644–1912) ===
The imperial period was characterized mainly by the concept of law serving the state as a means of exerting control over the citizenry. In the late Qing dynasty there were efforts to reform the law codes by importing German codes with slight modifications. During the Qing dynasty, criminal justice was based on extremely detailed Great Qing Legal Code. One element of the traditional Chinese criminal justice system is the notion that criminal law has a moral purpose, one of which is to get the convicted to repent and see the error of his ways. In the traditional Chinese legal system, a person could not be convicted of a crime unless he has confessed. This often led to the use of torture, in order to extract the necessary confession. These elements still influence modern Chinese views toward law. All capital offenses were reported to the capital and required the personal approval of the emperor.

The introduction and translation of Western legal texts into Chinese is believed to have been started under the auspices of Lin Zexu in 1839 and Qishan in 1841. More systematic introduction of Western law together with other Western sciences started with the establishment of Tongwen Guan in 1862. The major efforts in translation of Western law that continued until the 1920s prepared the building blocks for modern Chinese legal language and Chinese law. Legal translation was very important from 1896 to 1936 during which period the Chinese absorbed and codified their version of Western laws. These efforts were assisted by the medium of the Japanese legal language and law developed in Japan during the Meiji period which involved in large part Japanese translation of European Continental laws.

Under pressure from European powers and increasing commercial interactions, the influence of European legal systems on China increased. The First Opium War ended with the 1842 Treaty of Nanjing between China and the United Kingdom. The first of the unequal treaties, it required the establishment of five treaty ports in Chinese cities. The Treaty of the Bogue introduced extraterritoriality in favor of the UK, pursuant to which UK citizens were immune from prosecution in Chinese courts and instead only UK law applied. The United States obtained similar privileges under the 1844 Treaty of Wanghia, as did France under the 1844 Treaty of Whampoa. Concessions, where foreign law applied not just to foreigners but also to Chinese, further accelerated the influence of non-Chinese legal concepts.

In the early 1900s, the Qing dynasty's Imperial Recodification Commission prepared a proposed civil code which was significantly influenced by the German and Japanese legal systems. Jurist Shen Jiaben and Governor Zhang Zidong led late Qing legal reform efforts. The Qing dynasty was defeated before the code was adopted and the Republic of China rejected the proposed code, instead developing its own.

This continuous effort was amplified in the republican period resulting in the Provisional Constitution of 1912 which included the idea of equality under the law, rights for women, and broader rights for citizens in regard to the government. The Republic of China discarded the proposed code drafted at the end of the Qing empire and prepared its own civil code which it adopted in 1929. It was significantly influenced by German civil law.

=== Cultural revolution ===
The onset of the communist period rolled back the development of individual rights with the primary concept of law returning to that of a tool of the state. The Cultural Revolution devastated the ranks of intellectuals and legal professionals. It took until 1982 for the idea of individual rights to reemerge as a significant influence on Chinese law.

Over the past century China has had several constitutions. The first attempts towards implementing a constitution in China occurred during the final decade (1902–1912) of the Qing dynasty. Various controlling groups subsequently promulgated different constitutions between that time and the establishment of the PRC in 1949. The PRC had a provisional constitution from its inception until the enactment of its first constitution in 1954. This initial constitution was based on the constitution of the Soviet Union. It was shortly ignored, however, and became without legal force. Although it provided for the election of the National People's Congress (NPC) every four years as the highest state power, these guidelines were not adhered to. The second constitution of the PRC, modeled on the ideology of the Cultural Revolution, came into force in 1975. This constitution subjected the NPC to the CCP and removed previous constitutional protections such as equality under the law and private-property succession rights. It was also immediately disregarded through breaches of its provisions and non-adherence to guidelines regarding the NPC. The third constitution of the PRC was adopted in 1978. Although this version moved away from the ideologies of the Cultural Revolution, it did retain some remnants of it. It also retained CCP control over the state structure. However, reformists subsequently gained power, which led to the breakdown of this constitution as focus shifted to economic construction and modernization.

After the Communist victory in 1949, the newly established People's Republic of China (PRC) quickly abolished the ROC's legal codes and attempted to create a system of socialist law copied from the Soviet Union. With the Sino-Soviet split (1960–1989) and the Cultural Revolution (1966–1976), all legal work came under suspicion of being counter-revolutionary, and the legal system completely collapsed. A new concept of justice called judicial populism (sifa dazhonghua) was established. Instead of the requirement for judges to comply with strict judicial procedures, it promoted substantive justice and problem-solving mechanisms. This legal tradition is based on a cultural view of the non-finality in justice as well as the revolutionary practice of the Chinese Communist Party (CCP) that relies on people's justice.

=== Deng Xiaoping era (1979–1989) ===
With the start of the Deng Xiaoping reforms (c. 1979), the idea of reconstructing a legal system to restrain abuses of official authority and developing a "rule of law" to replace rule by dictatorship began to gain traction. New laws were passed and foreign investors sought improvements in property rights which had not been a feature of Maoist government but there was internal conflict in China over the extent of incorporating foreign legal norms into the Chinese legal system. Chinese reformers sought to create a special arbitration body, independent of the local legal system, called the China International Economic Trade and Arbitration Commission (CIETAC). In 1982 Peng Zhen said "It is necessary to draw on beneficial experiences – ancient or modern, Chinese or foreign – in studying the science of law...We study them in order to make the past serve the present and foreign things serve China". Others who were more supportive of reforms like Qiao Shi still urged caution against "just copying blindly" and Deng Xiaoping himself said "we must pay attention to studying and absorbing foreign experience...However, we will never succeed if we mechanically copy the experiences and models of other countries".

The current constitution was created in 1982. Article V states that no organization or individual is above the law and Article III makes the People's Congresses and state administration responsible to the people, paving the way for later efforts to allow enforcement of individual rights. Passage of the Administrative Litigation Law of 1987 created legal recourse for individuals from arbitrary government action which was previously unavailable. Despite the deep-seated norm against legal proceedings, litigation in the Chinese courts has increased dramatically in recent years. The continuing weakness of courts, resulting from their dependence on the local government for financial support and enforcement, undermines the effectiveness of these remedies. This has also begun to change with China's initiatives to increase legal training and the professionalism of the judiciary.

The current Constitution of the PRC, enacted in 1982, reflects the model of the first PRC constitution. The Constitution provides for leadership through the working class, led in turn by the CCP. The Constitution provides that the NPC is the supreme organ of state power over a structure of other people's congresses at various levels. The NPC has power to:

- amend the Constitution by a two-thirds majority
- promulgate legislation
- elect and remove highest-level officials
- determine the budget
- control economic and social-development planning

The NPC also includes a Standing Committee that functions much as the NPC does when the NPC is not in session. Although the Standing Committee has had some powers since 1955, its law-making powers were initially provided for in the 1982 Constitution. The NPC sits at the highest level in the hierarchy of governmental structure in the PRC. This national level is followed in descending order by the provincial level (including autonomous regions and municipalities directly under the national level), the prefectural level, the county level, and the townships and towns level. Government members at the lower two levels are directly elected, and those at the higher levels are elected by the lower levels. In addition to the NPC, the provincial people's congresses possesses legislative power and can pass laws so long as they do not contravene the Constitution or higher legislation or administrative regulations.

The Constitution states its own supremacy. The Constitution provides for legislative, executive, judicial, and procuratorial powers causing them to all remain subject to CCP leadership. Important political decisions are made through actions which are not regulated by the Constitution. Additionally, courts need not rely on the Constitution in deciding cases, and they may not review legislation for Constitutionality.

Since 1979, when the drive to establish a functioning legal system began, more than 300 laws and regulations, most of them in the economic area, have been promulgated. The use of mediation committees, informed groups of citizens who resolve about 90% of the PRC's civil disputes and some minor criminal cases at no cost to the parties, is one innovative device.

== Contemporary law ==
=== Republic of China ===
Law in the Republic of China (Taiwan) is mainly a civil law system. The legal structure is codified into the Six Codes: the Constitution, the Civil Code, the Code of Civil Procedures, the Criminal Code, the Code of Criminal Procedures and in Administrative Laws.

=== People's Republic of China ===
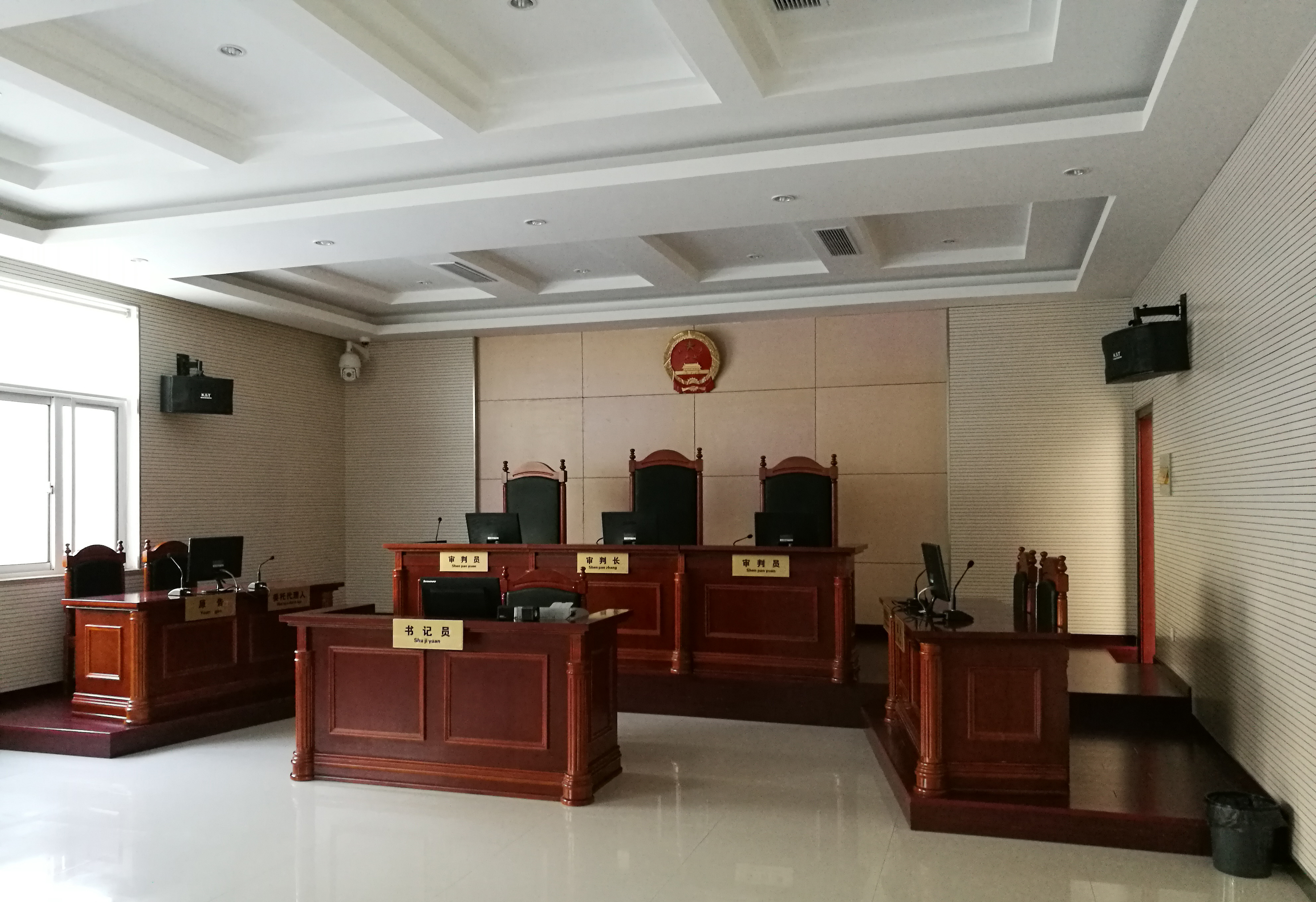
Court room in the People's Republic of China

Unlike traditional Chinese law, modern Chinese law is based mainly on statutory law and court judgments do not have binding precedential value.

In drafting the new laws, the PRC has not copied any other legal system wholesale, and the general pattern has involved issuing laws for a specific topic or location. Often laws are drafted on a trial basis, with the law being redrafted after several years. This process of creating a legal infrastructure piecemeal has led to many situations where the laws are missing, confusing, or contradictory, and has led to judicial decisions having more precedental value than in most civil law jurisdictions. In formulating laws, the PRC has been influenced by a number of sources, including traditional Chinese views toward the role of law, the PRC's socialist background, the German-based law of the Republic of China on Taiwan, and the English-based common law used in Hong Kong.

Legal reform became a government priority in the 1990s. The Chinese government has promoted a reform it often calls fǎzhì huà (法制化:"legalisation"). Legalisation, has provided the régime with a gloss of legitimacy and has enhanced predictability. There have been major efforts in the rationalization and strengthening of the legal structure and institution building in terms of developing and improving the professionalism of the legislature, judiciary and legal profession.

In 2005, China started implementing legal reform, which revived the Maoist-era ideals adopted during the 1950s due to the position that the law is cold and unresponsive to the needs of its citizens. This initiative favored mediation over court trials when it came to resolving conflicts among citizens and conflicts between citizens and the state. It also revived judicial populism at the expense of judicial professionalism and was marked by the return of the mass-trial model used during the 1940s. Since 2012, Chinese lawyers are required to pledge a loyalty oath to the CCP.

== See also ==
- Three Supremes
