= Bob Pickard (businessman) =

Canadian businessman and former political aide

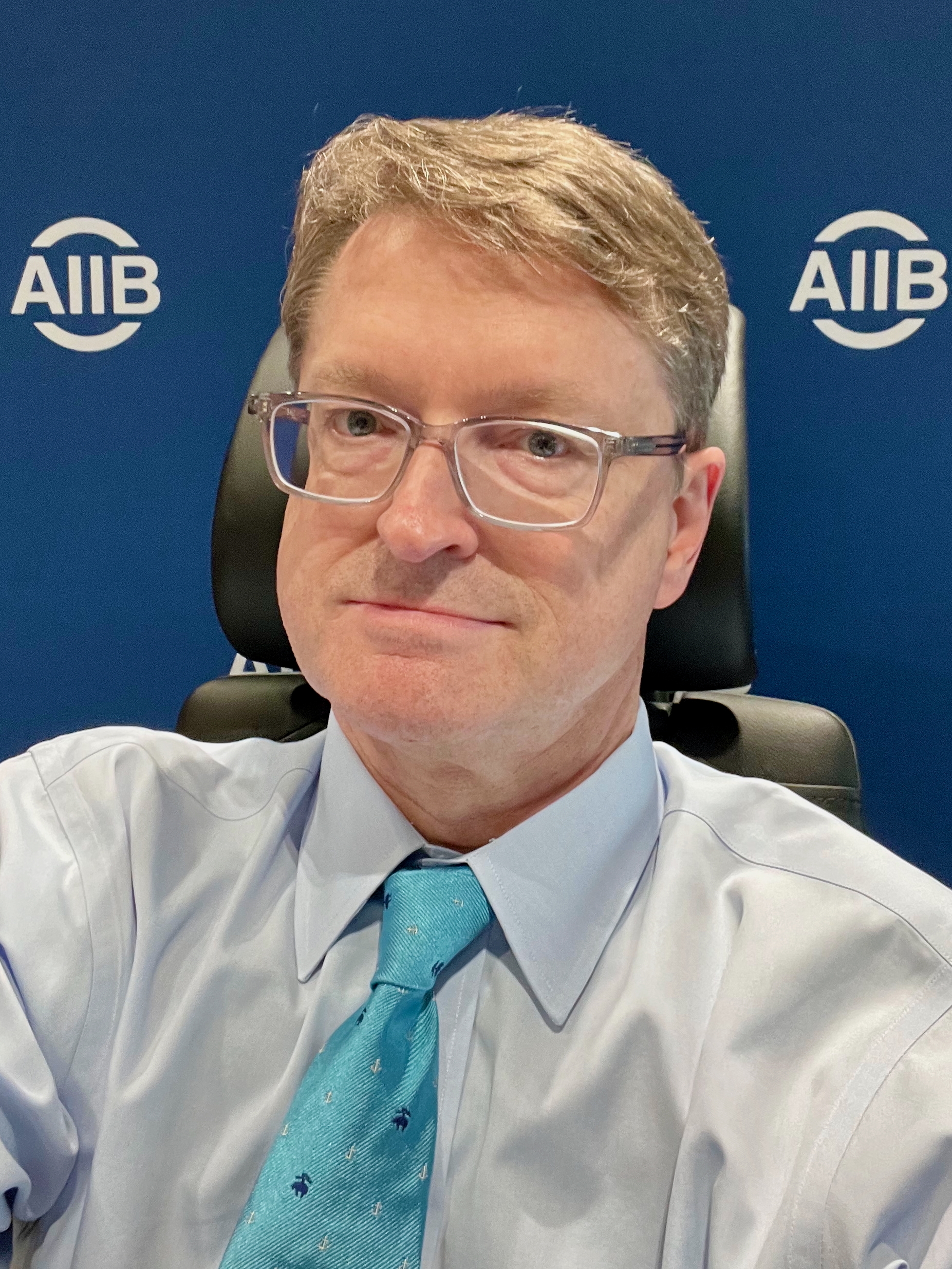
- Pickard in 2022
- Born: Robert Pickard; Toronto, Canada
- Education: Queen's University
- Occupation: Businessman
- Known for: Whistleblower while global communications director of the Asian Infrastructure Investment Bank (AIIB)

Bob Pickard is a Canadian businessman known for his work in public relations. He was the former global communications director of the Asian Infrastructure Investment Bank (AIIB), where his departure became notable for his whistleblowing activity, explaining the influence of the Chinese Communist Party over the AIIB.

== Career ==
Pickard is a graduate of Queen's University, receiving a Bachelor of Arts in Political Studies. He would go on to serve as a political aide to several Canadian federal Cabinet ministers, including Joe Clark, who previously served as the 16th prime minister of Canada. Pickard was also a member of the Canadian delegation that participated in the 1992 United Nations Earth Summit.

Transitioning into public relations, Pickard managed the Asia-Pacific region of Burson-Marsteller, Huntsworth, and led the market entry of Edelman into Japan. Pickard was the Vice President of Hill & Knowlton Canada and later co-founded Environics Communications in 1994. He was recognized in the PR Week "Global Power Book", which lists influential communicators in the industry.

In 2024, Pickard became a Senior Fellow at the Macdonald–Laurier Institute. He is also an Executive Fellow at the Center for the Future of Organization, an independent think tank at the Drucker School of Management at Claremont Graduate University in California. In addition to these fellowships, Pickard holds the title of Principal at Leadership Communication.

Pickard previously served on the Board of the Glenn Gould Foundation.

=== Asian Infrastructure Investment Bank whistleblowing ===
In March 2022, Pickard became the Director General of Communications at the Asian Infrastructure Investment Bank (AIIB), a multilateral development bank and international financial institution, to lead its global communications strategy. In June 2023, Pickard publicly resigned in protest over what he described as the undue influence of the Chinese Communist Party in AIIB’s everyday operations which he said constituted a failure of transparent governance and created a "toxic culture" inside the bank. Pickard abruptly fled China prior to announcing his resignation, which he posted on social media before arriving in Japan. The Government of Canada froze its participation in the AIIB after Pickard's allegations and is conducting an extended review of the country’s membership in the bank in consultation with other G7 countries. In December 2023, the Canadian Finance Ministry announced that it would be expanding its investigation to include "an analysis of AIIB investments, its governance and management frameworks".

An AIIB internal investigation claimed that it "follows the highest standards of multilateral governance, that its governance is functioning as intended, and that there was no evidence of undue influence on decisions taken by the Board of Directors or Management." In front of a House of Commons of Canada committee on Canada-China relations later that year, Pickard testified that "so long as we have the Chinese Communist Party trying to work to undermine Western democracies...it is impossible" for the AIIB to be reformed. As of June 2025, the Canadian investigation into Pickard's claims is still ongoing.

Following the announcement that Zou Jiayi, a member of the Chinese Communist Party Central Committee and deputy secretary-general of the Chinese People's Political Consultative Conference, would succeed Jin Liqun as president of the AIIB, Pickard stated, "Her appointment signals the Communist Party's continued strategy of placing trusted political cadres in key international institutions like the AIIB".
