= Bob Pickard =

Bob Pickard may refer to:

- Bob Pickard (American football) (born 1952), American football wide receiver
- Bob Pickard (businessman) (fl. 1980s–2020s), Canadian businessman

== See also ==
- Bob Picard (born 1949), American football wide receiver
