= Jürgen von Hagen =

German economist

Jürgen von Hagen (born in Iserlohn on December 14, 1955) is a German economist and professor at the University of Bonn, where he currently also serves as director of the Institute for International Economic Policy. He was awarded the Gossen Prize in 1997.

== Biography ==
A native of Iserlohn, Jürgen von Hagen studied at the University of Bonn, where he earned a diploma and a Ph.D. in economics in 1981 and 1986. During his Ph.D. studies, von Hagen worked as a research assistant at the university's Institute for International Economic Policy (1981–87). After his graduation, he worked as assistant professor and later as associate professor of business economics and public policy at Indiana University (1987–92) before following a call by the University of Mannheim back to Germany in 1992. There, he took over the direction of the Institute for Advanced Studies, before moving back to his alma mater, the University of Bonn, in 1996 as director of the Center for European Integration Studies. Since 2006, von Hagen has directed the Institute for International Economic Policy.

Professionally, von Hagen is affiliated with the European Economic Association and the Centre for Economic Policy Research - of which he is a fellow - as well as with the National Academy of Sciences Leopoldina. Additionally, he is also affiliated with the American Economic Association, Econometric Society, and the Verein für Socialpolitik. Moreover, von Hagen performs editorial duties for a number of academic journals, including the European Journal of Political Economy, Journal of Money, Credit and Banking and the Scottish Journal of Political Economy and previously worked as editor for the European Economic Review. Finally, von Hagen has acted as a consultant for many international organizations, including the International Monetary Fund, World Bank, Federal Reserve Bank, and European Commission.

== Research ==
Jürgen von Hagen is one of the leading scholars on the macroeconomics of European integration, the Eurozone, and European public finance. According to IDEAS/RePEc, Jürgen von Hagen belongs to the top 2% of economists.

=== European public finance ===
After early work on the monetary policy of West Germany in the 1980s, von Hagen (with Michele Fratianni) turned towards the study of the European Monetary System (EMS) and Germany's role within it. In particular, they argued that - despite the relative monetary weakness of France and Italy - Germany had merely an independent but not a dominant role within the EMS . Another set of studies by Jürgen von Hagen (together with Kerstin Bernoth, Ludger Schuknecht and Guido Wolswijk) compares the bond yield spreads between countries within the EMU and Canada, analyses the impact of the 2008 financial crisis on these spreads, and between EU Member States. They notably find that risk premia increase with fiscal imbalances such as difficulties regarding deficit and debt service payments, making expansionary fiscal policy more expensive.

A substantial body of von Hagen's academic work relates to the relationship between countries' fiscal governance, fiscal institutions and fiscal performance. Within this body of research, von Hagen has highlighted the effectiveness of formal fiscal restraints at the state level in the United States and the importance of centralized budget processes and commitments to maintain fiscal discipline (with Ian Harden). Later research has further emphasized the importance of the political setting within which fiscal decisions are taken. Studying the impact of fiscal rules in the European Union, von Hagen (with Guntram Wolff) finds that the Stability and Growth Pact induced EU governments to increase their use of creative accounting to hide fiscal deficits through stock-flow adjustments, especially during recessions, but had hardly any impact on the success or failure of attempts at fiscal consolidation among European countries in the 1990s; by contrast, von Hagen, Andrew Hughes Hallett and Rolf Strauch find that the economic conditions within which fiscal consolidations were begun in the EU during the 1990s had a strong impact on their likelihood of success by influencing governments' choices among consolidation strategies. Finally, research by von Hagen with Strauch and Mark Hallerberg finds that the centralisation of budgeting procedures was successful in reducing public debt among EU Member States by adjusting the flexibility of fiscal decision-making to the political alignment of the government (coalition), with e.g. fiscal contracts providing an effective commitment device within "ideologically dispersed" coalitions.

=== European monetary economics and the macroeconomics of European integration ===
Jürgen von Hagen has also published extensively on the macroeconomics of European integration and the Eurozone. Before the Eurozone's conception, in the mid-1990s, von Hagen (and Manfred Neumann) supported the vision of a "Europe of Two Speeds", with a monetary union including Germany, France, Benelux, Sweden and Austria that would allow the remaining economies within the EU to converge more quickly with this core union; failing that, he cautioned against the creation of a monetary union before such adjustments would have occurred. Moreover, he already emphasized in the 1990s the risk that excessive budget deficits in the Eurozone may pressure the European Central Bank to violate its fiscal restrictions and bail out excessively indebted governments ex post (by monetizing the government's debt) or ex ante (by keeping interest rates very low), thus in turn priming the Eurozone for high inflation (with Barry Eichengreen).

More general contributions by von Hagen to monetary economics include his analysis (with Manfred Neumann) of the effectiveness of inflation targeting throughout the 1990s, wherein they conclude that it was effective in reducing the level and volatility of inflation by improving the credibility of central bank's monetary policies and his study of the determinants of banking crises (with Tai-Kuang Ho), which finds only a negligible role for money base growth on the likelihood of banking crises, whereas real GDP slowdown, low real interest rates, hyperinflation, large fiscal deficits and exchange rate overvaluation tend to be reliable predictors of banking crises.

== Positions on economic policy ==
Mirroring his academic work, Jürgen von Hagen has repeatedly emphasized the importance of fiscal discipline and small fiscal deficits at the German and European level. In 1998, he was one of the signatories of the Petersberg Declaration on a Future-Oriented Labour Market Policy in Germany, which called for the deregulation of labour markets and making unemployment benefits conditional on searching a job (among else). However, von Hagen was also very critical of the Hartz labour market reform, arguing that its focus on labour market matching was misplaced, and instead supported economic stimulus through reductions in corporate taxes, wealth taxes, and value added taxes. During the Eurozone crisis, von Hagen supported sovereign debt restructuring procedures for overly indebted countries over the introduction of Eurobonds, an expansion of the European Financial Stability Mechanism, or structural adjustment programmes.
