= Pan Ligang =

Chinese politician

- 潘立刚
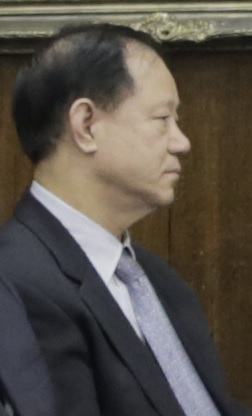
- Pan Ligang in July 2017

Executive Deputy Secretary-General of the Chinese People's Political Consultative Conference
- In office September 2016 – September 2021
- Preceded by: Sun Huaishan
- Succeeded by: Zou Jiayi

Personal details
- Born: May 1956 (age 70) Beijing, China
- Party: Chinese Communist Party
- Education: Dalian Maritime University

Chinese name
- Simplified Chinese: 潘立刚
- Traditional Chinese: 潘立剛
Transcriptions
Standard Mandarin
- Hanyu Pinyin: Pān Lìgāng

Pan Ligang (Chinese: 潘立刚; born May 1956) is a Chinese politician.

He was a member of the 12th National Committee of the Chinese People's Political Consultative Conference and is a member of the Standing Committee of the 13th Chinese People's Political Consultative Conference. He was a representative of the 17th and 19th National Congress of the Chinese Communist Party. He is a member of the 19th Central Committee of the Chinese Communist Party.

== Biography ==
Pan was born in Beijing, in May 1956. During the late Cultural Revolution, he was a sent-down youth in Pinggu County (now Pinggu District). He joined the Chinese Communist Party (CCP) in December 1976. After resuming the college entrance examination, in 1978, he was admitted to Dalian Marine College (now Dalian Maritime University) and worked China Ocean Shipping Corporation after graduation in 1984.

In January 1984, he was despatched to the Organization Department of the Chinese Communist Party, where he served in various posts for 20 years.

He was appointed head of the Organization Department of the CCP Hubei Provincial Committee in March 2006 and in September was admitted to member of the Standing Committee of the CCP Hubei Provincial Committee, the province's top authority. He also served as president of the Hubei Provincial Party School of the Chinese Communist Party and the Hubei Provincial Academy of Governance between March 2008 and May 2010.

He was recalled to the original Organization Department of the Chinese Communist Party in June 2010 and rose to become its deputy head in March 2013. He was also vice minister of Human Resources and Social Security from May 2013 to June 2016.

He was appointed deputy secretary of the Party Group of the Organs of the Chinese People's Political Consultative Conference in July 2016, concurrently serving as executive deputy secretary-general of the Chinese People's Political Consultative Conference since August 31. In September 2021, he took office as vice chairperson of Population, Resources and Environment Committee of the Chinese People's Political Consultative Conference.

Assembly seats
Preceded by Sun Huaishan	Executive Deputy Secretary-General of the Chinese People's Political Consultative Conference; 2016–2021	Succeeded by Zou Jiayi
Government offices
Preceded by Yin Weimin	Director of the Fourth Cadre bureau of the Organization Department of the Chinese Communist Party; 2000–2004	Succeeded by Xia Chongyuan
New title	Director of the Talent Work Bureau of the Organization Department of the Chinese Communist Party; 2004–2006	Succeeded by Jin Yang (金阳)
Preceded by Song Yuying	Head of the Organization Department of the CCP Hubei Provincial Committee; 2006–2010	Succeeded by Hou Chang'an
Preceded by Yang Song	President of the Hubei Provincial Party School of the Chinese Communist Party; 2008–2010	Succeeded by Hou Chang'an
Preceded by Wang Qinfeng	Director of the Second Cadre bureau of the Organization Department of the Chinese Communist Party; 2010–2013	Succeeded by Chen Xiangqun
