= Keyu Jin =

Chinese economist (born 1982)

- 金刻羽
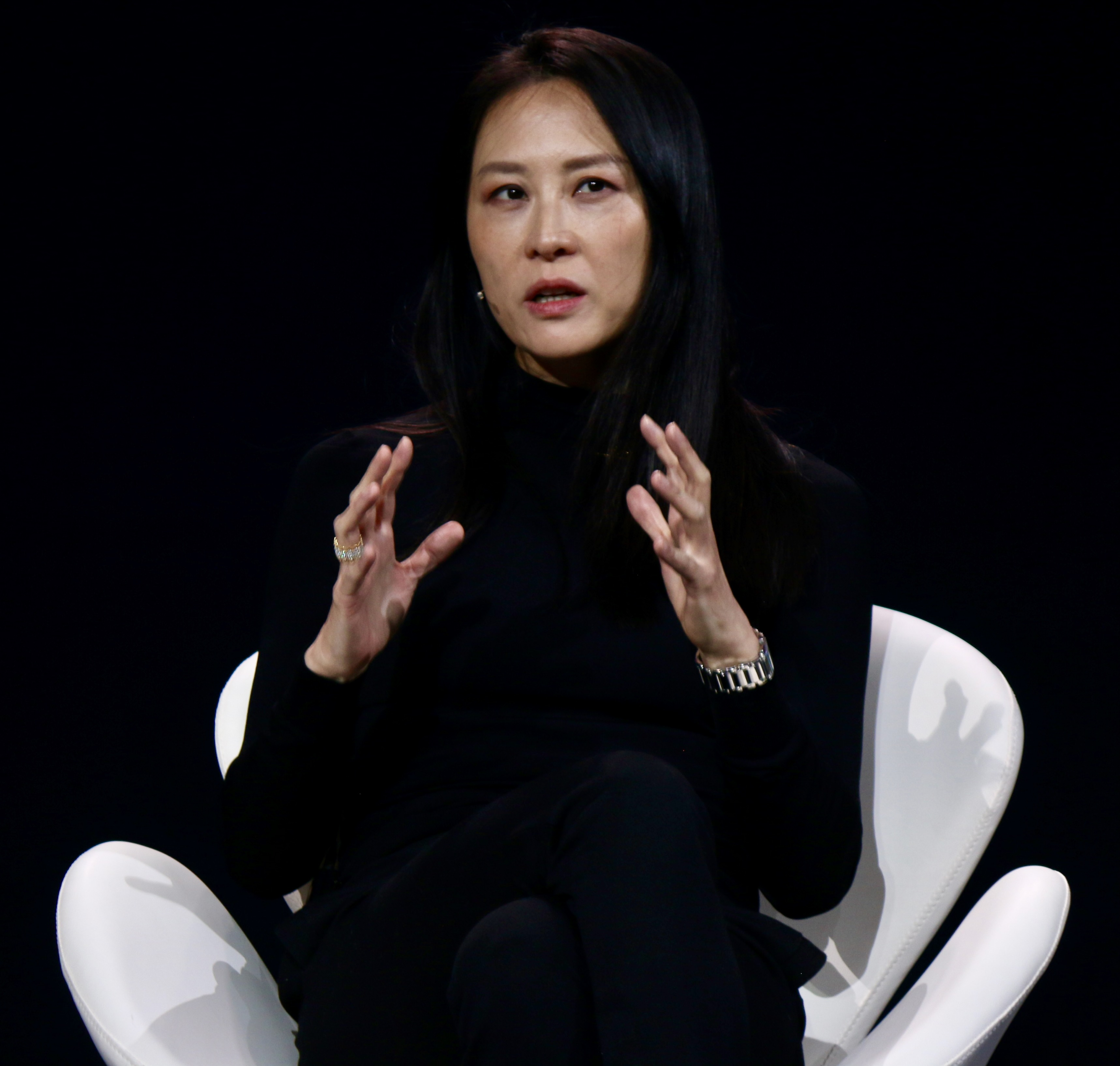
- Jin in 2025 at MWC
- Born: November 13, 1982 (age 43); Beijing, China
- Education: Harvard University (BA, PhD)
- Father: Jin Liqun
- Scientific career
- Workplaces: London School of Economics; Hong Kong University of Science and Technology
- Thesis: Essays on international trade and macroeconomic dynamics (2009)
- Doctoral advisor: Kenneth Rogoff
- Website: keyujin.com HKUST faculty page

Keyu Jin (Chinese: 金刻羽; pinyin: Jīn Kèyǔ; born 13 November 1982) is a Chinese economist. She has been a professor of finance at the Hong Kong University of Science and Technology since 2025.

Jin graduated from Harvard University with a bachelor's degree in 2004 and a PhD degree in 2009, both in economics. At the London School of Economics, she served as Lecturer in Economics from 2009 to 2017 and as Associate Professor from 2017 to 2024.

== Early life and education ==
Jin was born in Beijing, China. Her father, Jin Liqun, is an economist and politician who previously served as the vice minister of finance of China and is the founding president of the Asian Infrastructure Investment Bank.

Jin completed her junior high education at the High School Affiliated to Renmin University of China in Beijing and her senior high education at Horace Mann School in New York City. She received a Bachelor of Arts degree in economics in 2004 and a Doctor of Philosophy degree in economics in 2009, both from Harvard University. Her doctoral dissertation, advised by Kenneth Rogoff, was titled Essays on international trade and macroeconomic dynamics (2009).

== Career ==
Jin is a specialist in macroeconomic and financial policy issues. Her research focuses on global imbalances and global asset prices, drivers of China's growth model, the impact of the one-child policy, and the Chinese saving puzzle.

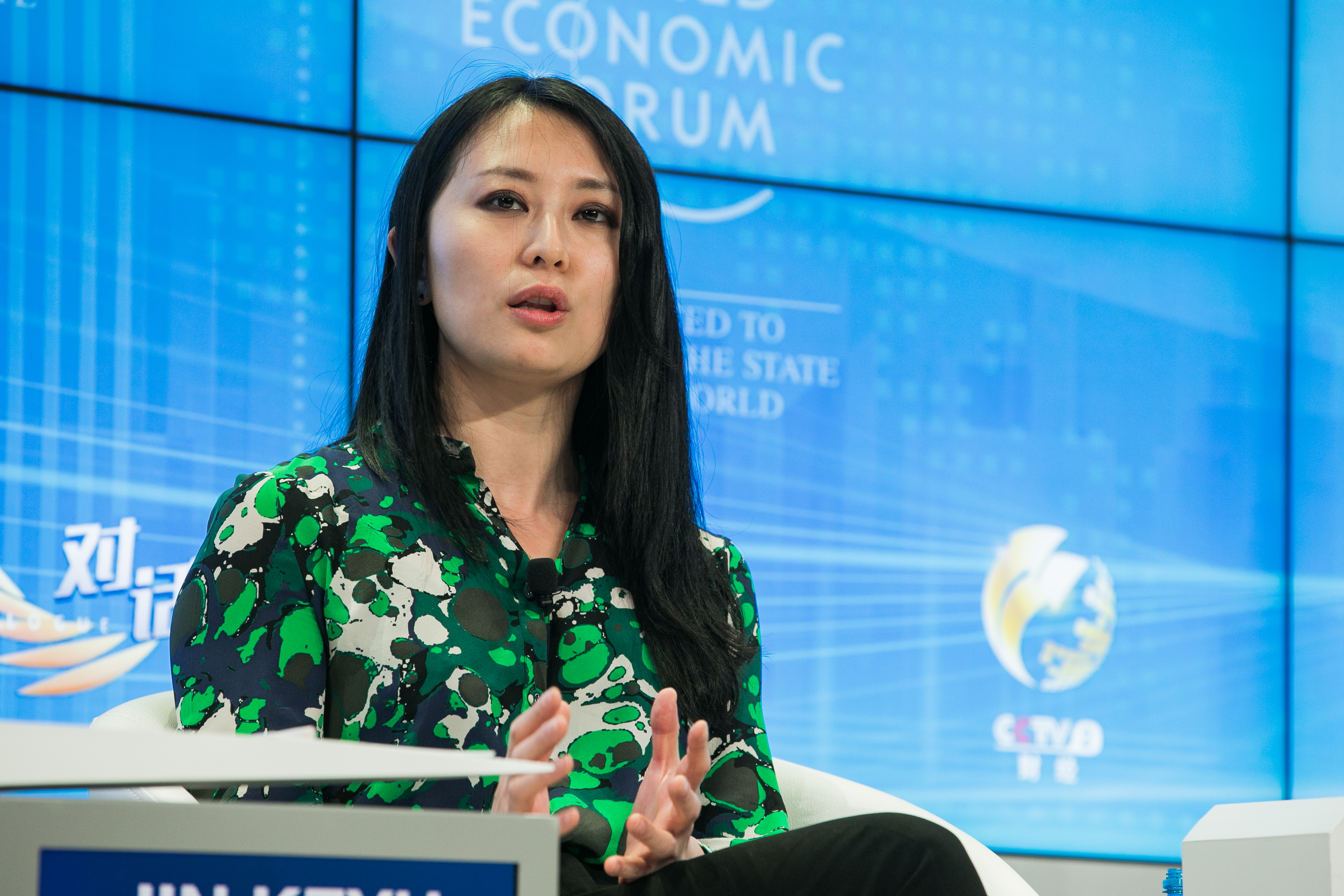
Jin in 2018 at World Economic Forum

After receiving her PhD degree, Jin joined the Department of Economics at the London School of Economics as a faculty member in 2009. She served as Lecturer in Economics from 2009 to 2017 and as Associate Professor of Economics from 2017 to 2024.

In 2025, Jin joined the Hong Kong University of Science and Technology as a Professor at the Department of Finance at the School of Business and Management.

== Social engagement ==
Jin was named Young Global Leader by the World Economic Forum in 2014. Jin was also a visiting professor at Yale University on the Cowles Fellowship from September to December 2012 as well as at the University of California, Berkeley from January to May 2015. In 2022, Jin joined the board of Credit Suisse and was a member of the Risk Committee and the Digital Transformation and Technology Committee. She is a member of the China Finance 40 Forum.

Jin has advised and consulted for the World Bank, the International Monetary Fund, and the Federal Reserve Bank of New York. She also has had experience at financial institutions, including Goldman Sachs, JP Morgan, and Morgan Stanley. She is a columnist for Project Syndicate and Caixin Magazine, and has contributed opinion pieces to media outlets such as the Financial Times and the South China Morning Post. Jin also serves as a non-executive director of Richemont Group. She served on a working committee for China Banking Regulatory Commission on Fintech and sat on the editorial board of the Review of Economic Studies.

== Publications ==
=== Books ===
- The New China Playbook: Beyond Socialism and Capitalism, May 16, 2023. In The New China Playbook, Jin writes that China has achieved significant progress without following the "Western path" and its innovation and technological development challenge the view that China must converge with Western economic systems and political persuasions to continue its development. The book takes a positive view of China's mechanisms of state-led economic intervention.

=== Articles ===
- China's Economy Is Leaving Behind Its Educated Young People, Wall Street Journal, May 11, 2023
