= Asian Infrastructure Investment Bank =

Multilateral development bank

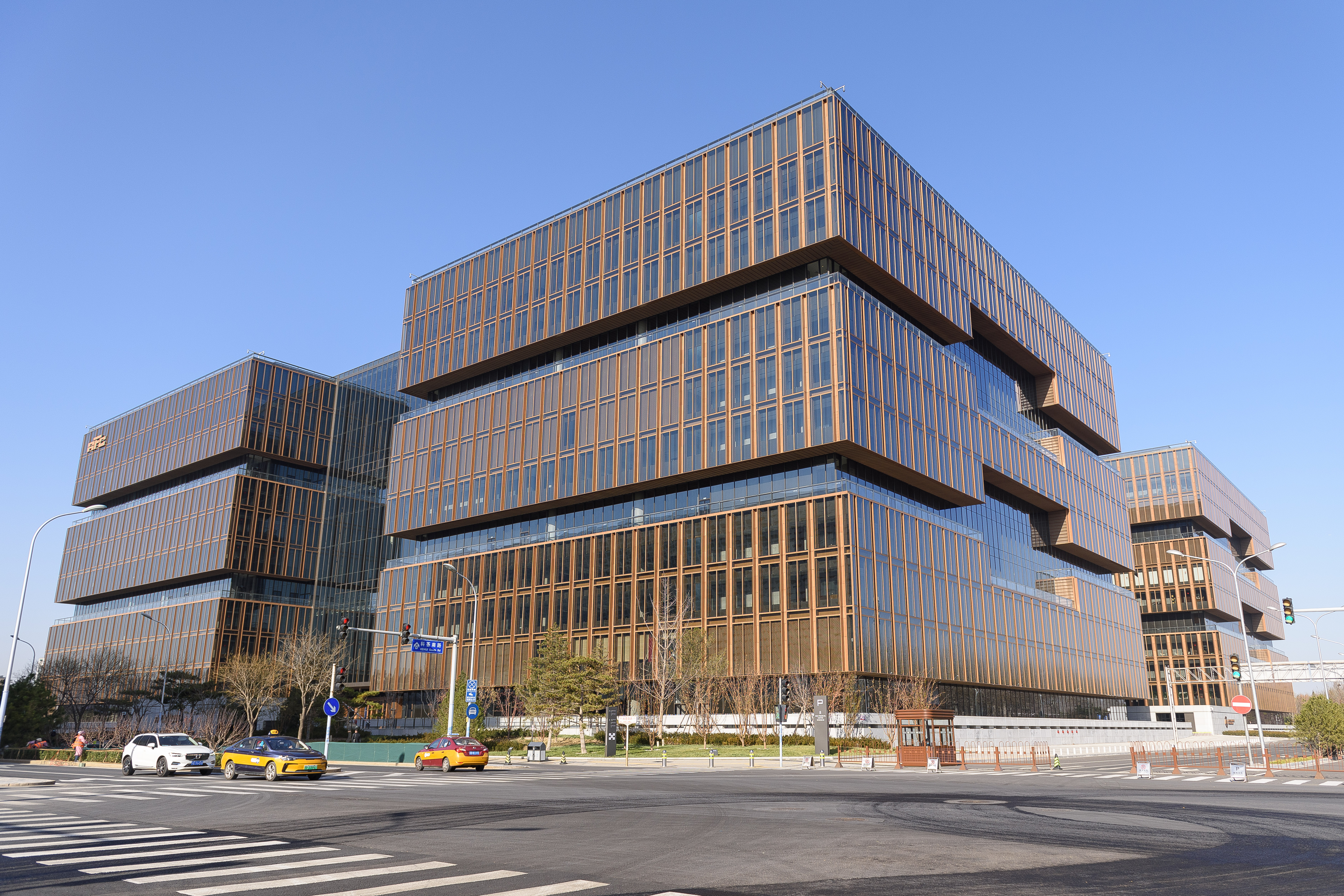
- Headquarters in Beijing
- Abbreviation: AIIB
- Formation: 16 January 2016; 10 years ago
- Type: International financial institution
- Legal status: Treaty
- Purpose: Crediting
- Headquarters: Beijing, China
- Region served: Worldwide, with a focus on Asia, Africa and Oceania
- Members: 111 member states
- Official language: English (lingua franca)
- Key people: Zou Jiayi (President)
- Main organ: Board of Governors; Board of Directors
- Website: aiib.org

The Asian Infrastructure Investment Bank (AIIB) is a multilateral development bank and international financial institution whose stated mission is to collectively improve economic and social outcomes in Asia. It is the world's second largest multi-lateral development institution. Headquartered in Beijing, China, the bank currently has 111 members, including 6 prospective members from around the world. The breakdown of the 111 members by continents are as follows: 42 in Asia, 26 in Europe, 22 in Africa, 10 in Oceania, 9 in South America, and 2 in North America. The bank started operation after the agreement entered into force on 25 December 2015, after ratifications were received from 10 member states holding a total number of 50% of the initial subscriptions of the Authorized Capital Stock.

The United Nations has addressed the launch of AIIB as having potential for "scaling up financing for sustainable development" and to improve the global economic governance. The starting capital of the bank was US$100 billion, equivalent to 2/3 of the capital of the Asian Development Bank and about half that of the World Bank. The bank was first proposed by China in 2013 and the initiative was launched at a ceremony in Beijing in October 2014. It has since received the highest credit ratings from the three biggest rating agencies in the world, and has been seen since its inception as a potential rival or an alternative to the World Bank and the International Monetary Fund (IMF).

As of September 2026, the AIIB has 111 members and has invested almost $70 billion in over 350 projects . At the group's 2026 annual meeting in Doha, AIIB President Zou Jiayi stated that they plan to double their yearly financing by 2030, targeting $20 billion per year.

== History ==
The proposal for the creation of an "Asian Infrastructure Investment Bank" was first made by the Vice Chairman of the China Center for International Economic Exchanges, a Chinese government think tank, at the Bo'ao Forum in April 2009. The initial context was to make better use of Chinese foreign currency reserves during the 2008 financial crisis.

The initiative was officially launched by General Secretary of the Chinese Communist Party Xi Jinping on a state visit to Indonesia in October 2013. The Chinese government has been frustrated with what it regards as the slow pace of reforms and governance, and wants greater input in global established institutions like the IMF, World Bank and Asian Development Bank which it claims are heavily dominated by American, European and Japanese interests.

At inception, the AIIB was explicitly linked to China's Belt and Road Initiative. The AIIB was subsequently broadened to include investments with states that are not involved with the BRI and its mission characterized more generally as building "infrastructure for tomorrow," with a focus on green infrastructure and connectivity.

In April 2014, Chinese Premier Li Keqiang delivered a keynote speech at the opening of the Boao Forum for Asia and said that China was ready to intensify consultations with relevant parties in and outside Asia on the preparations for the Asian Infrastructure Investment Bank.

The Asian Development Bank Institute published a report in 2010 which said that the region requires $8 trillion to be invested from 2010 to 2020 in infrastructure for the region to continue economic development. In a 2014 editorial, The Guardian newspaper wrote that the new bank could allow Chinese capital to finance these projects and allow it a greater role to play in the economic development of the region commensurate with its growing economic and political clout. But until March 2015, China in the ADB has only 5.47 percent voting right, while Japan and US have a combined 26 percent voting right (13 percent each) with a share in subscribed capital of 15.7 percent and 15.6 percent, respectively. Dominance by both countries and slow reforms underlie China's wish to establish the AIIB, while both countries worry about China's increasing influence.

In June 2014 China proposed doubling the registered capital of the bank from $50 billion to $100 billion and invited India to participate in the founding of the bank. The bank was founded in Beijing in October 2014. On 24 October 2014, twenty-one countries signed a Memorandum of Understanding (MOU) regarding the AIIB in Beijing, China: Bangladesh, Brunei, Cambodia, India, Kazakhstan, Kuwait, Laos, Malaysia, Myanmar, Mongolia, Nepal, Oman, Pakistan, Philippines, Qatar, Singapore, Sri Lanka, Thailand, Uzbekistan and Vietnam. Indonesia's joining was slightly delayed due to their new presidential administration not being able to review the membership in time. Indonesia signed the MOU on 25 November 2014.

The U.S. allegedly tried to keep Australia and South Korea from becoming prospective founding members, after they expressed an interest in it. However, both Australia and South Korea applied to join the bank in March 2015.

Hong Kong's Financial Secretary John Tsang announced in his budget speech in February 2015 that the territory would join the AIIB. It did however not become one of the prospective founding members and negotiated as part of the Chinese delegation.

In early March 2015, the United Kingdom's Chancellor of the Exchequer, George Osborne, announced that the UK had decided to apply to join the Bank, becoming the third Western country to do so after Luxembourg and New Zealand. The announcement was criticised by the U.S. Obama Administration. A US government official told Financial Times, "We are wary about a trend toward constant accommodation of China, which is not the best way to engage a rising power." The official further stated that the British decision was taken after "no consultation with the US." In response, the UK indicated that the subject had been discussed between Chancellor Osborne and US Treasury Secretary Jack Lew for several months preceding the decision. It was further stated that joining the bank as a founding member would allow the UK to influence the development of the institution. By encouraging Chinese investments in the next generations of nuclear power plants, Osborne announced that "the City of London would become the base for the first clearing house for the yuan outside Asia."

Following the criticism, the White House National Security Council, in a statement to The Guardian, declared,

Our position on the AIIB remains clear and consistent. The United States and many major global economies all agree there is a pressing need to enhance infrastructure investment around the world. We believe any new multilateral institution should incorporate the high standards of the World Bank and the regional development banks. Based on many discussions, we have concerns about whether the AIIB will meet these high standards, particularly related to governance, and environmental and social safeguards [...] The international community has a stake in seeing the AIIB complement the existing architecture, and to work effectively alongside the World Bank and Asian Development Bank.

After the UK's decision to join the AIIB, a surge of new applications followed, including several other European states – including Germany, France and Italy – with a total number reaching 53 by the end of March. German Finance Minister Wolfgang Schäuble stated, "We want to contribute our long-standing experience with international financial institutions to the creation of the new bank by setting high standards and helping the bank to get a high international reputation." In March 2015, the South Korean Ministry of Strategy and Finance announced that it, too, is planning to join the AIIB, citing its potential in helping South Korean companies win deals in infrastructural projects as well expanding South Korea's influence in international banking as a founding member. States could indicate their interest in becoming a Prospective Founding Member until 31 March 2015.

Negotiations took place in the framework of five Chief Negotiators Meetings (CNMs) which took place between November 2014 and May 2015. The Articles of Agreement, the legal framework of the bank, were concluded in the fifth CNM. It was signed on 29 June 2015 by 50 of the named 57 prospective founding members in Beijing, while the other seven signed later.

On 25 December 2015, the Articles of Agreement entered into force. On 16 January 2016, the board of governors of the bank convened its inaugural meeting in Beijing and declared the bank open for business. Jin Liqun was elected as the bank's president for a five-year term. 17 states (Australia, Austria, Brunei, China, Georgia, Germany, Jordan, Luxembourg, Mongolia, Myanmar, the Netherlands, New Zealand, Norway, Pakistan, Singapore, South Korea and the United Kingdom) together holding 50.1% of the initial subscriptions of Authorized Capital Stock, had deposited the instrument of ratification for the agreement, triggering entry into force, and making them all founding members and bringing the Articles of Agreement, the bank's charter, into force. 35 other states followed later, taking the amount of Authorized Capital Stock held by the 29 members of the bank to 74%.

=== AIIB within PRC policy thinking ===
==== Fostering long-term economic development ====
The Asian Infrastructure Investment Bank can be construed as a natural inter-national extension of the infrastructure-driven economic development framework that has sustained the rapid economic growth of China since the adoption of the reform and opening up under Chinese leader Deng Xiaoping. It stems from the notion that long-term economic growth can only be achieved through systematic, and broad-based investments in infrastructure assets – in contrast with the more short-term "export-driven" and "domestic consumption" development models favored by mainstream Western Neoclassical economists and pursued by many developing countries in the 1990s and the first decade of the 21st century with generally disappointing results.

==== Infrastructure as regional integration and foreign policy tool ====
In his 29 March 2015 speech at the Boao Forum for Asia (BFA) annual conference, Xi Jinping said:

[T]he Chinese economy is deeply integrated with the global economy and forms an important driving force of the economy of Asia and even the world at large. […] China's investment opportunities are expanding. Investment opportunities in infrastructure connectivity as well as in new technologies, new products, new business patterns, and new business models are constantly springing up. […] China's foreign cooperation opportunities are expanding. We support the multilateral trading system, devote ourselves to the Doha Round negotiations, advocate the Asia-Pacific free trade zone, promote negotiations on regional comprehensive economic partnership, advocate the construction of the Asian Infrastructure Investment Bank (AIIB), boost economic and financial cooperation in an all-round manner, and work as an active promoter of economic globalization and regional integration.

Xi insisted also that the Silk Road Fund and the Asian Infrastructure Investment Bank would foster "economic connectivity and a new-type of industrialization [in the Asia Pacific area], and [thus] promote the common development of all countries as well as the peoples' joint enjoyment of development fruits."

Academic Suisheng Zhao writes that China's launching of the AIIB was intended by China to reduce tensions caused by the United States' efforts to delay reform of the Bretton Woods system, intended to provide international public goods, and intended to provide China with increased participation in international rule-making.

== Legal basis and membership ==
Articles of Agreement of the Asian Infrastructure Investment Bank
- Prospective members (regional) Members (regional) Prospective members (non-regional) Members (non-regional)
- Signed: 29 June 2015
- Location: Beijing, China
- Effective: 25 December 2015
- Condition: Ratification by 10 states, comprising 50% of initial subscriptions of capital stock
- Signatories: 57
- Parties: 72 (96% of initial subscriptions of capital stock)
- Depositary: Government of the People's Republic of China
- Languages: Chinese, English (used in disputes) and French

The Articles of Agreement form the legal basis for the Bank. 57 Prospective Founding Members (PFM) named in annex A of the agreement are eligible to sign and ratify the Articles, thus becoming a member of the Bank. Other states, which are parties to the International Bank for Reconstruction and Development or the Asian Development Bank may become members after approval of their accession by the bank.

The Articles were negotiated by the Prospective Founding Members, with Hong Kong joining the negotiations via China.

=== Members ===
The 57 Prospective Founding Members can become Founding Members through:

- Signing the Articles of Agreement in 2015
- Ratifying the Articles of Agreement in 2015 or 2016

All Prospective Founding Members have signed the Articles, 52 of which have ratified them, comprising 92% of the shares of all PFM. The formal actions towards becoming a Founding Member are shown below, as well as the percentage of the votes and of the shares, in the event all prospective founding states become parties, and no other members are accepted.

In March 2017, 13 other states were granted prospective membership: 5 regional (Afghanistan, Armenia, Fiji, Timor Leste and Hong Kong, China) and 8 non-regional: Belgium, Canada, Ethiopia, Hungary, Ireland, Peru, Sudan and Venezuela. In May 2017, 7 states were granted prospective membership: 3 regional (Bahrain, Cyprus, Samoa) and 4 non-regional (Bolivia, Chile, Greece, Romania). In June 2017, 3 other states were granted prospective membership: 1 regional (Tonga) and 2 non-regional (Argentina, Madagascar). In 2018, 7 other states were granted prospective membership: 1 regional (Lebanon) and 6 non-regional (Algeria, Ghana, Libya, Morocco, Serbia, Togo). In 2019, 9 other states were granted prospective membership: 9 non-regional (Djibouti, Rwanda, Benin, Côte d'Ivoire, Guinea, Tunisia, Uruguay, Croatia, Senegal). In 2020, Liberia were granted prospective membership. In 2021, 2 states were granted prospective membership:1 regional (Iraq) and 1 non-regional (Nigeria). In 2023, 4 states were granted prospective membership: 4 non-regional (Mauritania, El Salvador, Solomon Islands, Tanzania). They become members after finishing their domestic procedures. As of January 2026, the total number of countries approved for membership of AIIB is 111 (Regional Members: 52, Non-Regional Members: 54, Prospective Members: 5). Countries holding at least 2.0% of either the total subscriptions or voting powers are in bold.

Members

Country / Region	Total Subscriptions (Amount of Shares in millions USD)	Voting Power (Number of Votes)
Afghanistan	86.6	1,807
Algeria	5.0	1,337
Argentina	5.0	1,337
Armenia	37.4	1,661
**Australia**	3,691.2	38,799
Austria	500.8	6,895
Azerbaijan	254.1	4,428
Bahrain	103.6	2,323
Bangladesh (Note: Signatories of the Memorandum of Understanding)	660.5	8,492
Belarus	64.1	1,928
Belgium	284.6	4,133
Benin	5.0	1,337
Brazil	5.0	1,937
Brunei	52.4	2,411
Cambodia	62.3	2,510
Canada (Note: Membership suspended indefinitely pending results of investigation)	995.4	9,250
Chile	10.0	1,387
**China**	29,780.4	299,691
Cook Islands	0.5	1,292
Côte d'Ivoire	5.0	1,328
Croatia	5.0	1,337
Cyprus	20.0	1,487
Denmark	369.5	5,582
Djibouti	0.5	1,292
Ecuador	5.0	1,337
Egypt	650.5	8,392
El Salvador	5.0	1,337
Ethiopia	45.8	1,745
Fiji	12.5	1,412
Finland	310.3	4,990
**France**	3,375.6	35,643
Georgia	53.9	2,426
**Germany**	4,484.2	46,729
Ghana	5.0	1,337
Greece	10.0	1,387
Guinea	5.0	1,307
Hong Kong	765.1	8,938
Hungary	100.0	2,287
Iceland	17.6	2,063
**India**	8,367.3	85,560
**Indonesia**	3,360.7	35,494
Iran	1,580.8	11,372
Iraq	25.0	1,487
Ireland	131.3	2,600
Israel	749.9	9,386
**Italy**	2,571.8	27,605
Jordan	119.2	3,079
Kazakhstan	729.3	9,180
Kenya	5.0	1,337
**South Korea**	3,738.7	39,274
Kuwait	536.0	7,247
Kyrgyzstan	26.8	2,155
Laos	43.0	2,317
Liberia	5.0	1,317
Libya	52.6	1,813
Luxembourg	69.7	2,584
Madagascar	5.0	1,337
Malaysia	109.5	2,982
Maldives	7.2	1,959
Malta	13.6	2,023
Mauritania	5.0	1,337
Mongolia	41.1	2,298
Morocco	5.0	1,337
Myanmar	264.5	3,474
Nauru	0.5	1,292
Nepal	80.9	2,696
Netherlands	1,031.3	12,200
New Zealand	461.5	6,502
Norway	550.6	7,393
Oman	259.2	4,479
Pakistan	1,034.1	12,228
Papua New Guinea	5.0	1,327
Peru	154.6	2,833
Philippines	979.1	11,678
Poland	831.8	10,205
Portugal	65.0	2,537
Qatar	604.4	7,931
Romania	153.0	2,817
**Russia**	6,536.2	67,249
Rwanda	5.0	1,337
Samoa	2.1	1,308
**Saudi Arabia**	2,544.6	27,333
Senegal	5.0	1,337
Serbia	5.0	1,337
Singapore	250.0	4,387
Solomon Islands	0.5	1,292
South Africa	5.0	1,937
Spain	1,761.5	19,502
Sri Lanka	269.0	4,577
Sudan	59.0	1,456
Sweden	630.0	8,187
Switzerland	706.4	8,951
Tajikistan	30.9	2,196
Tanzania	5.0	1,327
Thailand	1,427.5	16,162
Timor-Leste	16.0	1,447
Togo	5.0	1,337
Tonga	1.2	1,299
Tunisia	5.0	1,337
**Turkey**	2,609.9	27,986
United Arab Emirates	1,185.7	13,744
**United Kingdom**	3,054.7	32,434
Uruguay	5.0	1,337
Uzbekistan	219.8	4,085
Vanuatu	0.5	1,292
Vietnam	663.3	8,520
**Unallocated Shares**	2,367.8	
**Grand Total**	100,000.0	1,136,676

Prospective Members

Country / Region	Prospective Founding Member status	Signature (Articles)	Ratification or Acceptance (Articles)	Total Subscriptions (Amount of Shares in millions USD)	Voting Power (Number of Votes)
Bolivia				26.1	1,911
Colombia					
Lebanon					
Nigeria					
Venezuela				209.0	3,740

Regional members

==== Dependent territories ====
The Articles of Agreement provide for non-sovereign entities to become members of the bank. In addition to the requirements for sovereign states, the membership of dependent territories must be supported by the state responsible for its external relations.

=== Non-members ===
The Czech Republic, Nigeria, Iraq, Colombia, Ukraine are considering joining the AIIB as members. Mexico, Japan and the United States have no immediate intention to participate. Taiwan's request to become a Prospective Founding Member was rejected by China as it does not consider the former to be a sovereign state.

Taiwan

- Taiwan applied for PFM to join the AIIB via Taiwan Affairs Office on 31 March 2015, possibly under the name "Chinese Taipei", but was rejected by the Multilateral Interim Secretariat of the AIIB on 13 April, without any reason stated. However, mainland China claims that there is the possibility for Taiwan to obtain membership at a later date. Foreign Ministry spokeswoman Hua Chunying said that Taiwan should avoid creating a "two Chinas" or "one China, one Taiwan" situation. ROC Finance Minister Chang Sheng-ford announced in April 2016 that Taiwan was not being treated with "dignity" or "respect" during the registration process and Taiwan eventually chose to leave the decision to join to the new president.

United States – No commitment

- The United States' officials have expressed concerns about whether the AIIB would have high standards of governance, and whether it would have environmental and social safeguards. The United States is reported to have used diplomatic pressure to try and prevent key allies, such as Australia, from joining the bank, and expressed disappointment when others, such as Britain, joined. The US' opposition to the AIIB, as well as its attempt to dissuade allies from joining was seen as a manifestation of a multifaceted containment strategy.

Japan – "Under Consideration" / No commitment

- Masato Kitera, Tokyo's envoy in Beijing, stated previously that Japan might join the AIIB. Japanese Finance Minister Tarō Asō previously indicated interest in joining the AIIB, but later switched his stance. Yoshihide Suga, Japan's Cabinet Secretary, told the public that Japan was still seeking China's full explanation of the AIIB as he stated, "As of today, Japan will not join AIIB and a clear explanation has not been received from China" and "Japan is dubious about whether (the AIIB) would be properly governed or whether it would damage other creditors". He also stated that Japan is no longer considering whether or not to join the bank. The Japanese Government Spokesman also announced that Japan would not join the AIIB. Japanese prime minister Shinzō Abe also added that Japan does not need to join the bank. But two years later, in May 2017, Shinzō Abe said joining the AIIB, created in part to fund the initiative, could be an option if governance questions were resolved. Toshihiro Nikai, secretary-general of the ruling party Liberal Democratic Party, suggested joining the AIIB.

== Shareholding structure ==
The Authorized Capital Stock of the bank is $100 billion (US dollars), divided into 1 million shares of $100,000 each. Twenty percent are paid-in shares (and thus have to be transferred to the bank), and 80% are callable shares. The allocated shares are based on the size of each member country's economy (calculated using GDP Nominal (60%) and GDP PPP (40%)) and whether they are an Asian or Non-Asian Member. The total number of shares will determine the fraction of authorized capital in the bank. Of the prospective founding members, three states decided not to subscribe to all allocated shares: Malaysia, Portugal, and Singapore, resulting in 98% of available shares being subscribed.

Three categories of votes exist: basic votes, share votes and Founding Member votes. The basic votes are equal for all members and constitute 12% of the total votes, while the share votes are equal to the number of shares. Each Founding Member furthermore gets 600 votes. An overview of the shares, assuming when all 57 Prospective Founding Members have become Founding Members is shown below (values in bold do not depend on the number of members):

Vote Type	% of Total Votes	Total Votes	Vote per Member	China (Largest PFM)	Maldives (Smallest PFM)
Basic votes	**12**	138,510	2,430	2,430	2,430
Share votes	85	981,514	Varies	297,804	72
Founding Member votes	3	34,200	**600**	600	600
Total	**100**	1,154,224	varies	300,834 (26.1%)	3,102 (0.3%)

== Governance ==
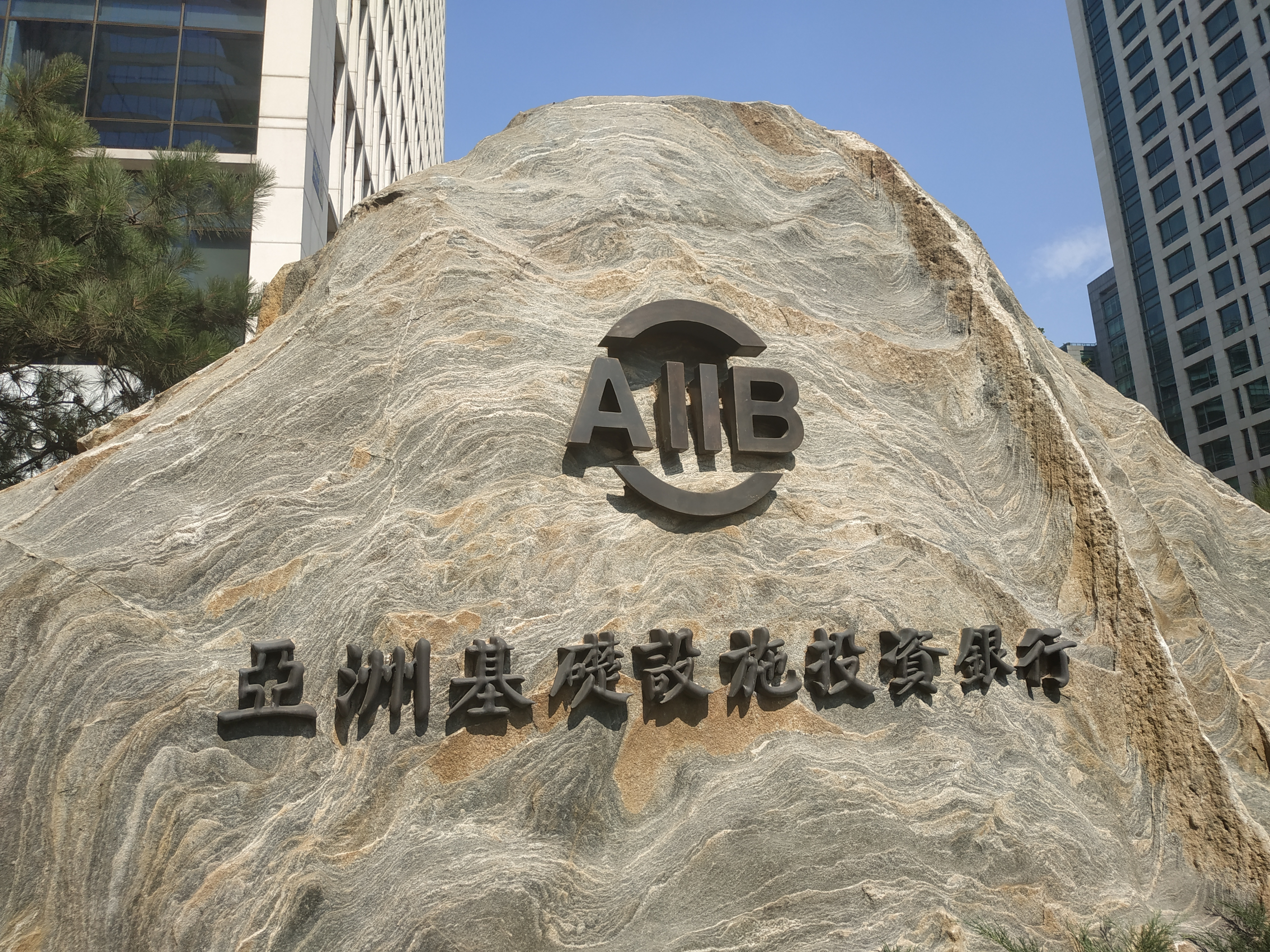
Name plaque of AIIB at its global headquarters in Beijing

The bank's governance structure is composed of the Board of Governors as the top-level and highest decision-making body. It is composed of 1 governor for each member state of the bank and in principle meets once a year. The board of directors, composed of 12 governors, each representing one or more member is responsible for daily operations and tasks delegated to it by the board of governors. Nine of those members are from within the Asia-Pacific region and three representing members outside the region.

Of the non-regional directors, 1 constituency is made up of EU member states having the Euro as their currency, and 1 from other European countries.

New members are considered for admission only once a year. An overview of the constituencies is shown below:

Country of Director	Countries of Alternates	Other Constituencies
Saudi Arabia	Kuwait; United Arab Emirates	Bahrain; Djibouti; Iraq; Jordan; Oman; Qatar
Turkey	Azerbaijan; Pakistan	Brunei; Georgia; Kyrgyzstan
Philippines	Malaysia; Thailand	Bangladesh; Maldives; Nepal
Russia	Iran; Kazakhstan	Belarus; Tajikistan
China	China	Hong Kong
Egypt	Algeria; Brazil	Argentina; Benin; Canada; Chile; Côte d'Ivoire; Ecuador; El Salvador; Kenya; Madagascar; Mauritania; Morocco; Peru; Rwanda; South Africa; Sudan; Tanzania; Togo; Tunisia; Uruguay
Australia	New Zealand; Singapore	Cook Islands; Nauru; Papua New Guinea; Vietnam
United Kingdom	Denmark; Poland	Hungary; Iceland; Norway; Romania; Sweden; Switzerland
Germany	France; Italy	Austria; Belgium; Croatia; Cyprus; Finland; Greece; Ireland; Luxembourg; Malta; Netherlands; Portugal; Spain
India	India	
Cambodia	Cambodia; Indonesia	Laos; Sri Lanka; Timor-Leste
	Israel; Uzbekistan	Fiji; South Korea 'Mongolia; Samoa; Tonga
Unallocated: Afghanistan; Armenia; Ethiopia; Ghana; Guinea; Liberia; Libya; Myanmar; Senegal; Serbia; Solomon Islands; Vanuatu

Senior Management of AIIB
Country		Name	Position in AIIB
(China)	China	Zou Jiayi	President and Chair of the Board of Directors
(United Kingdom)	The United Kingdom	Sherard Cowper-Coles	Vice President and Corporate Secretary
(Finland) (Australia)	Finland and Australia	Kaisu Christie	Vice President and Chief Administration Officer
(Germany)	Germany	Ludger Schuknecht	Vice President, Policy and Strategy
(India)	India	Ajay Bhushan Pandey	Vice President, Investment Solutions
(Malaysia)	Malaysia	Kim-See Lim	Chief Investment Officer, Public Sector (Region 1) & Financial Institutions and Funds (Global) Clients
(Russia)	Russia	Konstantin Limitovskiy	Chief Investment Officer, Public Sector (Region 2) & Project and Corporate Finance (Global) Clients
(Spain)	ESP	Gustavo De Rosa	Chief Financial Officer
(France)	France	Antoine Castel	Chief Risk Officer
(South Korea)	South Korea	Hun Kim	Chief Partnerships Officer and Director General, Sectors, Themes and Finance Solutions Department
(Brazil)	Brazil	Alberto Ninio	General Counsel
(Singapore)	Singapore	Jang Ping Thia	Acting Chief Economist
(Singapore)	Singapore	Hwee Tin Kng	Chief Internal Audit Officer, Internal Audit Office
(Thailand)	Thailand	Suthasinee (Alex) Nimitkul	Chief Ethics Officer
(Republic of Ireland)	Ireland	Philip Beauregard	Ombudsperson
(Spain) (Switzerland)	Spain and Switzerland	Carmen Nonay	Managing Director, Complaints-resolution, Evaluation and Integrity Unit
(China)	China	Yong Zhou	Chief Officer
(China)	China	Guorong Ding	Director General, Facilities and Administration Services Department
(China)	China	Ke Fang	Director General, Portfolio Management Department
(Hong Kong)	Hong Kong	Najeeb Haider	Director General, Project and Corporate Finance Clients Department, Global
(United Kingdom)	The United Kingdom	Jeffrey Hiday	Director General, Communications Department
(China)	China	Jian Ping Huang	Chief Information Officer and Head of IT and Data
(Malaysia)	Malaysia	Hui Fong Lee	Controller
(United Kingdom)	The United Kingdom	Gregory Liu	Director General, Financial Institutions and Funds Clients Department, Global
(India)	India	Rajat Misra	Director General, Public Sector Clients Department (Region 1)
(Italy)	Italy	Domenico Nardelli	Treasurer
(China)	China	Hua Tian	Director General and Assistant Corporate Secretary, Corporate Secretariat
(China)	China	Bin Wang	Acting Director General, Operational Partnerships Department
(China)	China	Yanning Wang	Director General, Sustainability and Fiduciary Solutions Department
(China)	China	Xiaohong Yang	Director General, Public Sector Clients Department (Region 2)
(China)	China	Quan Zheng	Director General, Strategy, Policy and Budget Department
(China)	China	Yuanjiang Sun	Head of Office, Interim Operational Hub in Abu Dhabi, United Arab Emirates

== Reception ==
The former president of the World Bank, Jim Yong Kim, has said that the need for infrastructure in developing countries is great so that the activities of new organizations would be welcome. The World Bank, IMF, and Asian Development bank have all cooperated with the AIIB as a complement to the Bretton Woods institutions and which further increases overall capacity for development funds.

Economist C. Fred Bergsten describes the AIIB as "helping meet a clear need for more infrastructure funding throughout Asia (and elsewhere)." He concludes that the AIIB "has adhered to internationally agreed norms and best practices, and is innovating some of its own." Additionally, Bergsten writes that China's role in the AIIB "has clearly met the U.S. request for China to function as a 'responsible stakeholder' in the world economy."

AIIB's dispute resolution process has drawn criticism because of its opaque administration. At the group's 2026 annual meeting in Doha, 108 Indigenous people from Indonesia, filed a formal complaint with the Project-affected People’s Mechanism (PPM), the centre-piece of dispute resolution. They claimed that an AIIB-financed project forced them from their homes and disregarded their right to be consulted. This was the 17th complaint filed in 2026 and the 45th filed since the PPM was established in 2018. As of October 2026, none of the complaints have been approved to move forward into dispute resolution.

=== Geopolitical implication in Asia-Pacific and beyond ===
There is no consensus in the United States about the role of the AIIB. John Ikenberry sees the AIIB as part of "China's emerging institutional statecraft," but argues that it is not clear whether the institution will tie China more deeply into the existing order or become a vehicle to challenge the order. Phillip Lipscy (Stanford University) argues that the United States and Japan should support the AIIB to encourage China's peaceful global leadership and discourage China from pursuing coercive or military options. On the other hand, Paola Subacchi (Chatham House) argues that the AIIB represents a threat to US-dominated global governance.

Think-tanks such as Chatham House, the China Studies Centre at the University of Sydney and the World Pensions Council (WPC) have argued that the successful establishment of a new supranational financial powerhouse headquartered in PRC would be facilitated by the large number of participating developed economies. These experts observe that the establishment of the Beijing-based AIIB does not necessitate rivalry, when economic cooperation is possible, and that the decision by the UK to participate advances its own interests even if some of its allies are opposed.

=== Environmental record ===
Although the proposed bank declared "AIIB will learn from the best practice in the world and adopt international standards of environmental protection," Oxford scholar of economics and energy policy Yuge Ma has argued that this may be complicated in developing Asian countries. Regarding the Energy Sector Strategy of the AIIB, analysis of statements from European and developing countries at annual meetings, compared with the Bank’s adopted strategies, highlighted shifting dynamics. From 2016 to 2018, European members pushed for greener investments, while many developing states supported continued fossil fuel financing, a stance reflected in the 2017 Energy Sector Strategy. Between 2019 and 2021, European influence became more evident, with the AIIB adopting a climate target of 50% of financing for climate-related projects in its 2020 Corporate Strategy. However, from 2021 to 2023, external pressures such as the COVID-19 pandemic and the energy crisis following Russia’s invasion of Ukraine reinforced energy security concerns among developing members, leading the 2022 Energy Sector Strategy to retain provisions for fossil-related projects. Overall, European members shaped the AIIB’s climate agenda, particularly during 2019-2021, but their influence was tempered by structural and geopolitical factors.

=== Political influence ===
The United States of America opposed the creation of the AIIB attempted to dissuade its allies from joining. Most of them rejected these attempts.

In June 2023, Bob Pickard, a Canadian national and the global communications director and official spokesperson of AIIB resigned, and fled from China. Pickard said that the AIIB was dominated by Chinese Communist Party (CCP) members who operate as an in-house secret police. He also claimed that all information going to AIIB's president, Jin Liqun, was filtered through those CCP officials, whose offices were the closest to Jin. Pickard went on to state that the AIIB has one of the most toxic cultures imaginable. Later the same day, Chrystia Freeland, the Deputy Prime Minister of Canada and Finance Minister announced that Canada is freezing ties with the AIIB while carrying out an investigation of the allegations and Canada's involvement in the AIIB. In the following day, the AIIB launched an internal investigation and welcomed the Canadian review, but called the allegation "baseless." In December 2023, the Canadian Finance Ministry announced that it would be expanding its investigation to include "an analysis of AIIB investments, its governance and management frameworks, as well as an examination of whether its environmental and social governance safeguards are effective and sufficient".

In the United Kingdom, AIIB faced criticism for having seconded HM Treasury staff. Conservative MP Tim Loughton, who was impacted by a Chinese cyber campaign, called for an audit of the UK's relationship with the AIIB. According to a report by the Intelligence and Security Committee of Parliament, Sir Danny Alexander's appointment as vice-president of the AIIB was partially influenced by the Chinese government, intending to lend credibility to Chinese investments through his name.

== Comparison with ADB and IBRD ==
($ million)
		AIIB	ADB	IBRD
Established		2016	1966	1944
Date as of		31 December 2017	31 December 2021	30 June 2022
Member	Total	84	68	189
Member	(Regional, Non-regional, Prospective)		49, 19, 0	–
Credit rating		AAA	AAA	AAA
Capital	Subscribed	95,001	148,903	286,636
Capital	Paid-in	19,000	7,447	20,499
Total assets		18,973	282,084	317,542
Lending		4,220	137,860	227,092

== Lending results ==
AIIB loans are fully transparent and publicly accessible on AIIB's website.

=== 2016 ===
During 2016, AIIB committed a total of $1.73 billion to nine projects, among which six projects are joint initiatives with other international lenders such as the World Bank and the Asian Development Bank. It had achieved its loan target of $1.2 billion for the first year.

2016 AIIB lending
Approval date	Country	Purpose	Amount M$	Co-lenders
24 June 2016	Tajikistan	Road improvement	27.5	European Bank for Reconstruction and Development
24 June 2016	Bangladesh	Power distribution lines	165.0	none
24 June 2016	Pakistan	Motorway construction	100.0	Asian Development Bank and Department for International Development (United Kingdom)
24 June 2016	Indonesia	Redevelopment of poor districts	216.5	World Bank
27 September 2016	Pakistan	Hydropower plant	300.0	World Bank
27 September 2016	Myanmar	Combined Cycle Gas Turbine power plant	20.0	International Finance Corporation, the Asian Development Bank and certain commercial lenders
8 December 2016	Oman	Railways	36.0	none
8 December 2016	Oman	Port facilities	265.0	none
21 December 2016	Azerbaijan	Gas pipeline	600.0	A number of other multilateral development banks including the World Bank and other commercial entities
Total			1,730.0	

=== 2017 ===
2017 AIIB lending
Approval date	Country	Purpose	Amount M$	Co-lenders
22 March 2017	Indonesia	Regional Infrastructure Development Fund Project	100.0	World Bank
22 March 2017	Indonesia	Dam Operational Improvement and Safety Project Phase II	125.0	World Bank
22 March 2017	Bangladesh	Natural Gas Infrastructure and Efficiency Improvement Project	60.0	Asian Development Bank
2 May 2017	India	Andhra Pradesh 24x7 – Power For All	160.0	World bank and Government of Andhra Pradesh
5 June 2017	Georgia	Batumi Bypass Road Project	114.2	Asian Development Bank
15 June 2017	India	India Infrastructure Fund	150.0	Other investors
15 June 2017	Tajikistan	Nurek Hydropower Rehabilitation Project, Phase I	60.0	World Bank and Eurasian Development Bank
4 July 2017	India	Gujarat Rural Roads Project	329.0	Government of Gujarat
4 September 2017	Egypt	Egypt Round II Solar PV Feed-in Tariffs Program	17.5	International Finance Corporation and other lenders
27 September 2017	India	Transmission System Strengthening Project	100.0	Asian Development Bank and Power Grid Corporation of India
27 September 2017	Philippines	Metro Manila Flood Management Project	207.60	World Bank
8 December 2017	India	Bangalore Metro Rail Project – Line R6	335.0	European Investment Bank and other lenders
8 December 2017	Oman	Broadband Infrastructure Project	239.0	none
8 December 2017	China	Beijing Air Quality Improvement and Coal Replacement Project	250.0	Beijing Municipality, China CDM Fund and Beijing Gas
Total				

=== 2018 ===
2018 AIIB lending
Approval date	Country	Purpose	Amount M$	Co-lenders
9 February 2018	Bangladesh	Bhola IPP	60.0	none
11 April 2018	India	Madhya Pradesh Rural Connectivity Project	140.0	World Bank
24 June 2018	India	National Investment and Infrastructure Fund	100.0	Government of India
24 June 2018	Turkey	Tuz Golu Gas Storage Expansion Project	600.0	World Bank, Islamic Development Bank, BOTAS and commercial loans
24 June 2018	Indonesia	Strategic Irrigation Modernization and Urgent Rehabilitation Project	250.0	World Bank
28 September 2018	India	Andhra Pradesh Rural Roads Project	455.0	Government of Andhra Pradesh
28 September 2018	Egypt	Sustainable Rural Sanitation Services Program	300.0	World Bank
28 September 2018	Turkey	TSKB Sustainable Energy and Infrastructure On-lending Facility	200.0	none
7 December 2018	Indonesia	Mandalika Urban and Tourism Infrastructure Project	248.39	Government of Indonesia
7 December 2018	India	Andhra Pradesh Urban Water Supply and Septage Management Improvement Project	400.0	Government of Andhra Pradesh

=== 2019 ===
2019 AIIB lending
Approval date	Country	Purpose	Amount M$	Co-lenders
26 March 2019	Bangladesh	Power System Upgrade and Expansion Project	120.0	Government of Bangladesh and Power Grid Corporation of Bangladesh
26 March 2019	Laos	National Road 13 Improvement and Maintenance Project	40.0	Government of Laos, NDF and IDA
4 April 2019	Sri Lanka	Reduction of Landslide Vulnerability by Mitigation Measures Project	80.0	Government of Sri Lanka
4 April 2019	Sri Lanka	Colombo Urban Regeneration Project	200.0	Government of Sri Lanka and private partner
21 May 2019	Nepal	Upper Trisuli I Hydropower Project	90.0	ADB, IFC, Korean Consortium
11 July 2019	Turkey	Efeler 97.6 MW Geothermal project	100.0	EBRD
11 July 2019	Bangladesh	Municipal Water Supply and Sanitation Project	100.0	World Bank, IDA, Government of Bangladesh
11 July 2019	Cambodia	Fiber Optic Communication Network Project	75.0	None
11 July 2019	India	L&T Green Infrastructure On-Lending Facility	100.0	None
26 September 2019	Pakistan	Karachi Water and Sewerage Services Improvement	40.0	World Bank
26 September 2019	India	Tata Cleantech Sustainable Infrastructure On-Lending Facility	75.0	TCCL
11 November 2019	Pakistan	Karachi Bus Rapid Transit	71.81	ADB
12 November 2019	Turkey	TKYB Renewable Energy and Energy Efficiency On-Lending Facility	200.0	None
6 December 2019	India	Rajasthan 250 MW Solar Project–Hero Future Energies	65.0	International Finance Corporation
6 December 2019	India	Rajasthan 250 MW Solar Project–Hero Future Energies	65.0	International Finance Corporation
12 December 2019	China	Beijing-Tianjin-Hebei Low Carbon Energy Transition and Air Quality Improvement Project	500.0	None
12 December 2019	India	West Bengal Major Irrigation and Flood Management Project	145.0	World Bank
12 December 2019	Egypt	National Bank of Egypt On-Lending Facility for Infrastructure	150.0	None
12 December 2019	Kazakhstan	Zhanatas 100 MW Wind Power Plant	46.7	Sponsors and other financial institutions
12 December 2019	Russia	Transport Sector Investment Loan	500.0	None
12 December 2019	Uzbekistan	Rural Infrastructure Development Project	82.0	World Bank
12 December 2019	Turkey	Istanbul Seismic Risk Mitigation and Emergency Preparedness Project	300.0	World Bank
12 December 2019	Nepal	Power Distribution System Upgrade and Expansion Project	112.3	Nepal Electricity Authority

=== 2020 ===
2020 AIIB lending
Approval date	Country	Purpose	Amount M$	Co-lenders
17 January 2020	Bangladesh	Dhaka and West Zone Transmission Grid Expansion Project	200.0	ADB
11 February 2020	Oman	Ibri II 500MW Solar PV Independent Power Plant Project	60.0	ADB
3 April 2020	Bangladesh	Sylhet to Tamabil Road Upgrade Project	404.0	None
3 April 2020	Uzbekistan	Bukhara Region Water Supply and Sewerage (BRWSSP)	385.1	None
16 April 2020	Bangladesh	Dhaka Sanitation Improvement	170.0	World Bank
7 May 2020	India	COVID-19 Emergency Response and Health Systems Preparedness Project	500.0	World Bank
7 May 2020	Indonesia	COVID-19 Active Response and Expenditure Support Program	750.0	ADB
7 May 2020	Bangladesh	COVID-19 Active Response and Expenditure Support Program	250.0	ADB
7 May 2020	Georgia	Emergency COVID-19 Response Project	100.0	World Bank
28 May 2020	Philippines	COVID-19 Active Response and Expenditure Support (CARES) Program	750.0	ADB
16 June 2020	Mongolia	COVID-19 Rapid Response Program	100.0	ADB
16 June 2020	India	COVID-19 Active Response and Expenditure Support (CARES)	750.0	ADB
16 June 2020	Pakistan	COVID-19 Active Response and Expenditure Support (CARES) Program	500.0	ADB
22 June 2020	Uzbekistan	Bukhara Road Network Improvement Project (Phase 1)	165.5	None
22 June 2020	Indonesia	Emergency Response to COVID-19 Program	250.0	World Bank
30 June 2020	Maldives	COVID-19 Emergency Response and Health Systems Preparedness Project	7.30	World Bank
30 June 2020	Kazakhstan	COVID-19 Active Response and Expenditure Support (CARES) Program	750.0	ADB
30 June 2020	Turkey	COVID-19 Credit Line Project	500.0	None
16 July 2020	Pakistan	Resilient Institutions for Sustainable Economy (RISE) Program	250.0	World Bank
16 July 2020	Turkey	Izmir Metro Expansion Phase 4: Fahrettin Altay – Narlidere Line Project	56.0	EBRD, BSTDB
16 July 2020	Georgia	COVID-19 Crisis Mitigation	50.0	World Bank
16 July 2020	Vietnam	COVID-19 Response Facility	100.0	IFC
13 August 2020	Fiji	Sustained Private Sector-Led Growth Reform Program	50.0	ADB
13 August 2020	Kyrgyz Republic	Kyrgyz Emergency Support for Private and Financial Sector Project	50.0	World Bank
13 August 2020	Uzbekistan	Healthcare Emergency Response Project	100.0	ADB
27 August 2020	Turkey	COVID-19 Medical Emergency Response (MER) Project	82.6	EBRD
27 August 2020	Bangladesh	COVID-19 Emergency Response and Pandemic Preparedness Project	100.0	World Bank
10 September 2020	Maldives	Greater Malé Waste-to-Energy Project	40.0	ADB
24 September 2020	India	HDFC Line of Credit for Affordable Housing	200.0	None
24 September 2020	Indonesia	Multifunctional Satellite PPP Project	150.0	None
15 October 2020	Laos	Climate Resilience Improvement of National Road 13 South Project (Section 3)	30.0	None
15 October 2020	China	Legend Capital Healthcare Technology Fund	30.0	None
15 October 2020	Russia	Russian Railways COVID-19 Emergency Response Project	300.0	None
16 October 2020	Bangladesh	Rural Water, Sanitation and Hygiene for Human Capital Development Project	200.0	World Bank
29 October 2020	India	Delhi-Meerut Regional Rapid Transit System (RRTS)	500.0	ADB
25 November 2020	Uzbekistan	National Bank for Foreign Economic Activity of the Republic of Uzbekistan COVID-19 Credit Line Project	200.0	None
25 November 2020	Turkey	Akbank COVID-19 Crisis Recovery Facility	100.0	None
25 November 2020	Ecuador	Corporación Financiera Nacional COVID-19 Credit Line Project	50.0	WB

=== 2024 ===
2024 AIIB lending
Approval date	Country	Purpose	Amount M$	Co-lenders
22 May 2024	Philippines	Bataan–Cavite Interlink Bridge	1.14	ADB

== See also ==
- New Development Bank (BRICS)/NDB BRICS
- Asian Development Bank – Regional development bank in Asia-Pacific
- African Development Bank – Multilateral development finance institution
- Caribbean Development Bank – International financial institution
- CAF – Development Bank of Latin America and the Caribbean – Latin American development bank
- European Investment Bank (EIB) – Investment bank of the European Union
- Inter-American Development Bank (IADB) – International organization for financing infrastructure development in Latin America
- Islamic Development Bank – Multilateral development financing institution located in Jeddah, Saudi Arabia
