= Zou Jiayi =

Chinese politician (born 1963)

- 邹加怡
- Zou in 2026

President of the Asian Infrastructure Investment Bank
- Incumbent
- Assumed office 16 January 2026
- Preceded by: Jin Liqun

Executive Deputy Secretary-General of the Chinese People's Political Consultative Conference
- In office September 2021 – January 2026
- Secretary-General: Li Bin; Wang Dongfeng
- Preceded by: Pan Ligang

Personal details
- Born: June 1963 (age 63) Wuxi, Jiangsu, China
- Party: Chinese Communist Party
- Education: University of International Relations

Zou Jiayi (simplified Chinese: 邹加怡; traditional Chinese: 鄒加怡; pinyin: Zōu Jiāyí; born June 1963) is a Chinese politician and economist, currently serving as the president of the Asian Infrastructure Investment Bank since 2026. Previously she served as a vice minister of the Ministry of Finance of the People's Republic of China from 2018 to 2021. Zou is a director of China Investment Corporation. In 2021, she was transferred to the Chinese People's Political Consultative Conference (CPPCC) and appointed as the Executive Deputy Secretary-General of the CPPCC (minister-level).

== Early life ==
Zou was born in June 1963 in Wuxi, Jiangsu province. She joined the Chinese Communist Party in 1984. She attended the University of International Relations in Beijing as an undergraduate. She holds a master's degree in economics from the Institute of World Economy & Politics of the Chinese Academy of Social Sciences.

== Career ==
Zou began working for the Ministry of Finance in 1988. From 1994 to 1996, Zou worked as a deputy chief of the department of the Ministry of Finance responsible for World Bank-related affairs, and from 1996 to 1998, as an advisor to China's World Bank Executive Board Office.

In 1999, pointing to the 1997 Asian financial crisis and Kosovo War, Zou was one of a number of Chinese analysts who expressed skepticism about American financial hegemony and cautioned China to make sure it protected its best interests and did not sacrifice too much in attempts to join the World Trade Organization.

From 1998 to 2015, Zou continued to work for the Ministry of Finance, eventually becoming director of its International Economic Relations Department in 2014. In 2015, she briefly served as a member of the Ministry's internal Communist Party committee and assistant minister of finance before transferring to a post in the Central Commission for Discipline Inspection, serving until 2017, when she was again promoted to Vice Minister of the Ministry of Supervision. In March 2018, she became a member of the leadership committee of the newly formed National Supervisory Commission, but was then brought back to the Ministry of Finance in June as one of its Vice Ministers and a Party committee member.

She was China's representative to 15th anniversary commemoration of the United Nations Convention against Corruption in 2018.

In June 2019, Zou was named to the 14-member monetary policy advisory committee of the People's Bank of China.

On 24 June 2025, Zou was elected as the second president of the Asian Infrastructure Investment Bank. She assumed the post on 16 January 2026, which is the bank's 10th anniversary.

Assembly seats
Preceded by Pan Ligang	Executive Deputy Secretary-General of the Chinese People's Political Consultative Conference; 2021–present	Incumbent
Positions in intergovernmental organisations
Preceded by Jin Liqun	President of the Asian Infrastructure Investment Bank; 2026–present	Incumbent
