= Ludger Schuknecht =

German economist

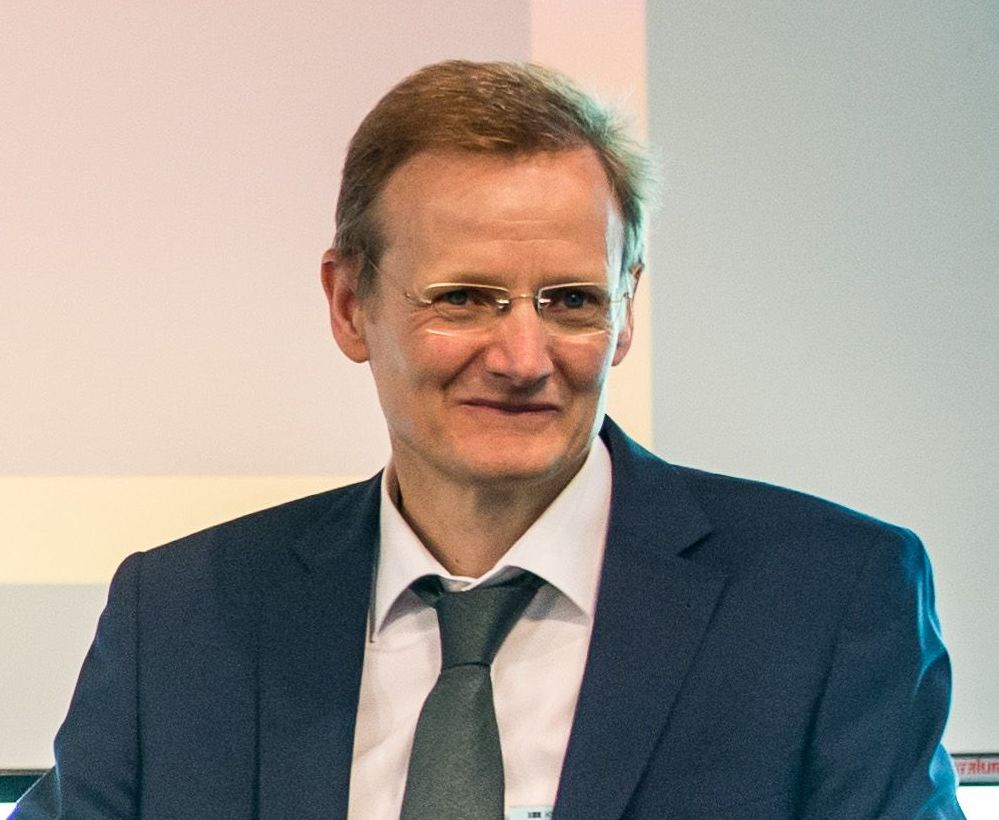
- Ludger Schuknecht, 2017
- Born: 2 December 1962 (age 63); Gelsenkirchen, Germany
- Education: LMU Munich and George Mason University
- Occupation: Economist
- Known for: Vice President of the Asian Infrastructure Investment Bank
- Children: 3

Ludger Schuknecht (born 2 December 1962 in Gelsenkirchen) is a German economist who is currently serving as Vice President for Policy and Strategy of the Asian Infrastructure Investment Bank, having previously served as Vice President and Corporate Secretary of the bank since 2021.

From 2018 to 2021, Schuknecht was one of four Deputy Secretaries-General of the OECD, under the leadership of Secretaries-General José Ángel Gurría and Mathias Cormann.

== Early life and education ==
Schuknecht studied economics at LMU Munich and George Mason University. In June 2000, he obtained his habilitation from the University of Konstanz.

== Career ==
Previously Schuknecht was Chief Economist at the German Ministry of Finance and heading the Directorate General Fiscal Policy and International Financial and Monetary Policy there. In this role he advised Minister Wolfgang Schäuble on economic policy issues in the domestic and international sphere. He acted as the chief negotiator for Germany in the founding of Asian Infrastructure Investment Bank. Schuknecht left after the departure of the fiscally conservative Schäuble and the arrival of his social democrat successor Olaf Scholz. In 2019, he was replaced with Jakob von Weizsäcker.

Before that Schuknecht was Senior Advisor in the Directorate General of Economics of the European Central Bank where he prepared monetary policy decision-making.

Schuknecht had also headed the ECB's fiscal surveillance section and served with the World Trade Organization and the International Monetary Fund.

As a scholar, Schuknecht's research focuses on public expenditure policies and reform and the analysis of economic boom-bust episodes. Together with Vito Tanzi he published "Public Spending in the 20th Century: A Global Perspective".

== Other activities ==
- Official Monetary and Financial Institutions Forum (OMFIF), Member of the Advisory Council
- Friedrich August von Hayek Foundation, Member of the Board of Trustees
- Ifo Institute for Economic Research, Member of the Board of Trustees

== Personal life ==
Schuknecht is married and has three children.
