= Constitution of China (disambiguation) =

Constitution of China (1982) is the supreme law of the People's Republic of China.

Constitution of China may also refer to the historical constitutions:

- Constitutions of Qing dynasty
  - 1908 Principles of the Constitution
  - 1911 Nineteen Articles
- Constitutions of the Republic of China (1912–1949)
  - 1912 Provisional Constitution of the Republic of China
  - 1923 Constitution of the Republic of China
  - 1931 Provisional Constitution of the Political Tutelage Period
  - 1947 Constitution of the Republic of China
  - 1948 Temporary Provisions against the Communist Rebellion
- Constitutional history of the People's Republic of China
  - 1954 Constitution of the People's Republic of China
  - 1975 Constitution of the People's Republic of China
  - 1978 Constitution of the People's Republic of China

== See also ==
- Constitution of the Chinese Communist Party
- Additional Articles of the Constitution of the Republic of China, amendments to the 1947 Constitution promulgated in Taiwan
