= Xiaohong Rose Yang =

Biomedical scientist

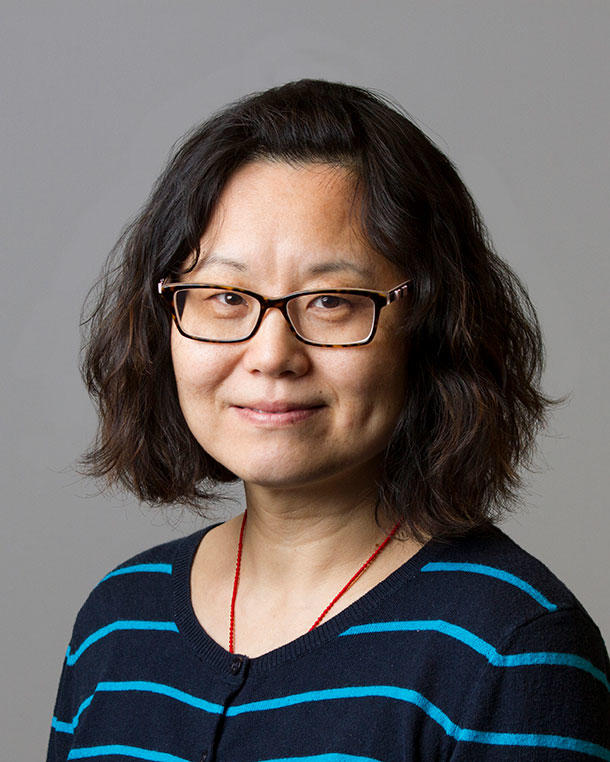
- Yang in 2019
- Education: Georgetown University; Johns Hopkins Bloomberg School of Public Health
- Scientific career
- Workplaces: National Cancer Institute
- Thesis: KAI1, A Metastasis Suppressor Gene for Human Breast Cancer (1999)

Xiaohong Rose Yang is an American biomedical scientist researching the genetics of dysplastic nevus syndrome and chordoma, and etiologic heterogeneity of breast cancer. She is a senior investigator at the National Cancer Institute. Yang leads breast cancer studies in mainland China, Hong Kong, and Malaysia.

== Education ==
Yang received a Ph.D. in physiology at Georgetown University's Lombardi Comprehensive Cancer Center in 1999. Her dissertation was titled KAI1, A Metastasis Suppressor Gene for Human Breast Cancer. Yang's mentors were Marc E. Lippman, Careen K. Tang, and Lisa L. Wei. She completed a M.P.H. in epidemiology from the Johns Hopkins Bloomberg School of Public Health in 2003. Yang joined the genetic epidemiology branch (GEB) at the National Cancer Institute (NCI) in 2000 as a postdoctoral fellow.

== Career ==
Yang became a tenure-track investigator at the NCI in 2006, and was appointed senior investigator upon receiving NIH scientific tenure in 2014. As of 2021, she is a senior investigator. Yang serves on the editorial board for Cancer Epidemiology, Biomarkers & Prevention, and is an adjunct associate professor at the Chinese University of Hong Kong. Her research interests include the genetics of dysplastic nevi syndrome and chordoma, and etiologic heterogeneity of breast cancer.

=== Research ===
Through a genome-wide search for copy number variations (CNVs), Yang identified the first susceptibility gene for familial chordoma—a germline duplication of the T gene that had eluded previous studies that focused on single nucleotide variants. Using funding from a 2008 NCI Division of Cancer Epidemiology and Genetics (DCEG) Intramural Research Award, she applied the same technique in melanoma-prone families and identified a germline duplication in a family without mutations in known melanoma genes. She presented these findings at the 2014 NCI Intramural Research Retreat.

Yang uses genomic technologies and statistical approaches to evaluate copy number and exome sequencing variants, as well as mRNA expression, miRNA expression, DNA methylation, chromatin modification, and telomere length in disease susceptibility. Yang and her colleagues identified a rare inherited mutation in a gene involved in maintaining telomere stability in melanoma families, further supporting a role for abnormal telomeres in the development of melanoma.

In her investigation of etiologic heterogeneity of breast cancer, Yang characterizes the molecular signature of tumors using tissue microarray and integrated tumor profiling analyses to identify risk factors for specific cancer subtypes. She leads breast cancer studies in mainland China, Hong Kong, and Malaysia to identify distinct molecular alterations in tumors and adjacent normal tissues among Asian women, and to examine the associations of these molecular changes with genetic and environmental risk factors, breast tissue composition and density, and breast cancer subtypes.

== Awards and honors ==
Yang received NCI Director's Intramural Innovation Awards in 2007 and 2009.

== Selected works ==
- Yang, Xiaohong; Wei, Lisa L.; Tang, Careen; Slack, Rebecca; Mueller, Susette; Lippman, Marc E. (July 2001). "Overexpression of KAI1 Suppresses in Vitro Invasiveness and in Vivo Metastasis in Breast Cancer Cells". Cancer Research. 61 (13): 5284–5288. ISSN 0008-5472. PMID 11431371.
- Yang, Xiaohong R.; Sherman, Mark E.; Rimm, David L.; Lissowska, Jolanta; Brinton, Louise A.; Peplonska, Beata; Hewitt, Stephen M.; Anderson, William F.; Szeszenia-Dąbrowska, Neonila; Bardin-Mikolajczak, Alicja; Zatonski, Witold (March 2007). "Differences in Risk Factors for Breast Cancer Molecular Subtypes in a Population-Based Study". Cancer Epidemiology, Biomarkers & Prevention. 16 (3): 439–443. doi:10.1158/1055-9965.EPI-06-0806. ISSN 1055-9965. PMID 17372238.
- Yang, Xiaohong R.; Chang-Claude, Jenny; Goode, Ellen L.; Couch, Fergus J.; Nevanlinna, Heli; Milne, Roger L.; Gaudet, Mia; Schmidt, Marjanka K.; Broeks, Annegien; Cox, Angela; Fasching, Peter A. (February 2011). "Associations of Breast Cancer Risk Factors With Tumor Subtypes: A Pooled Analysis From the Breast Cancer Association Consortium Studies". JNCI: Journal of the National Cancer Institute. 103 (3): 250–263. doi:10.1093/jnci/djq526. ISSN 1460-2105. PMC 3107570. PMID 21191117.
