= Sun Huaishan =

Chinese politician

- 孙怀山

Director of Hong Kong, Macao, Taiwan and Overseas Chinese Committee of the National Committee of the Chinese People's Political Consultative Conference
- In office August 2016 – March 2017
- Preceded by: Yang Chonghui

Personal details
- Born: July 1952 (age 74) Lianshui County, Jiangsu
- Party: Chinese Communist Party (expelled)
- Education: Harbin Institute of Technology

Sun Huaishan (simplified Chinese: 孙怀山; traditional Chinese: 孫懷山; pinyin: Sūn Huáishān; born July 1952) is a former Chinese politician who served as the Director of Hong Kong, Macao, Taiwan and Overseas Chinese Committee of the National Committee of the Chinese People's Political Consultative Conference. He was investigated in March 2017 by the Central Commission for Discipline Inspection, suspected of corruption.

== Career ==
Sun Huaishan was born in Lianshui County, Jiangsu. He was graduated from Harbin Institute of Technology, and worked in Jinhu County Agricultural Machinery Factory. In 1973, Sun joined Communist Youth League of China, and became the CYL Secretary of Jinhu County. In 1987, he became the deputy director, Director of the General Office of the Communist Youth League, and he became the Deputy Secretary of the National Committee of the Chinese People's Political Consultative Conference. In 2010, he became the Chinese Communist Party Committee Secretary of the National Committee of the Chinese People's Political Consultative Conference. Sun was by-elected the Director of Hong Kong, Macao, Taiwan and Overseas Chinese Committee of the National Committee of the Chinese People's Political Consultative Conference in August 2016.

== Downfall ==
In February 2017, Ming Pao reported that Sun was investigated by the Central Commission for Discipline Inspection. The CCDI confirmed that Sun was investigated on March 2, 2017. He was expelled from the Communist Party on June 2, 2017.

On September 17, 2018, Sun was sentenced on 14 years in prison and fined three million yuan for taking bribes worth 39.75 million yuan by the Intermediate People's Court in Hulun Buir.
