= Jin Liqun =

Chinese banker

Jin Liqun 金立群
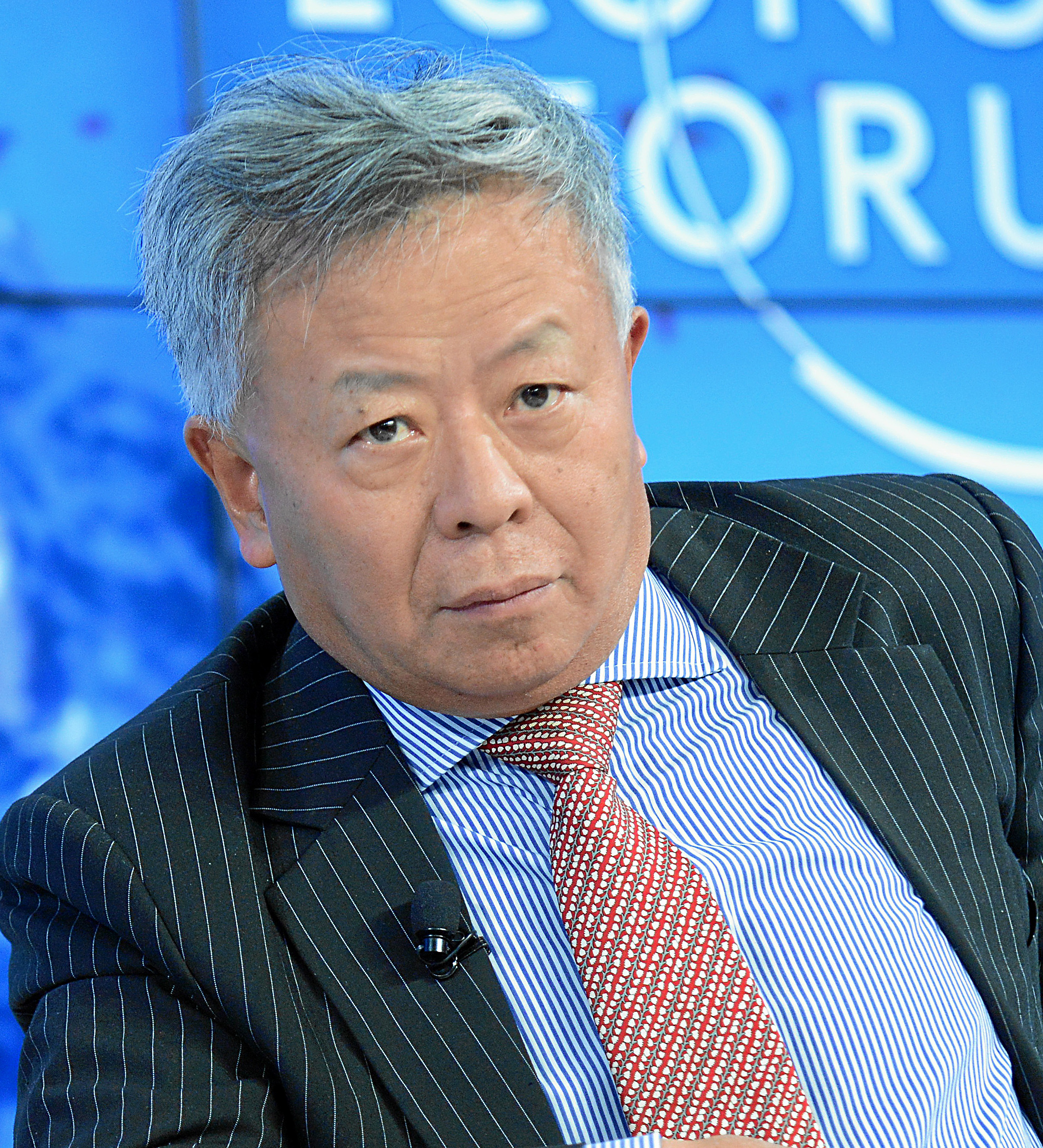
- Jin during the World Economic Forum 2013

President of the Asian Infrastructure Investment Bank
- In office 16 January 2016 – 15 January 2026
- Preceded by: Position established
- Succeeded by: Zou Jiayi

Personal details
- Born: August 1949 (age 76) Changshu, Jiangsu, China
- Party: Chinese Communist Party
- Children: Keyu Jin (daughter)
- Education: Beijing Foreign Studies University (MA); George Washington University; Boston University

Jin Liqun (Chinese: 金立群; born August 1949) is a Chinese banker who served as the founding president of the Asian Infrastructure Investment Bank from 2016 to 2026. Previously, he served as secretary general of the AIIB Interim Multilateral Secretariat from 2014 to 2016, as chairman of China International Capital Corporation from 2013 to 2014, as chairman of the supervisory board of China Investment Corporation from 2008 to 2013, as vice president of the Asian Development Bank from 2003 to 2008, and as vice minister of finance of China from 1998 to 2003.

== Early life and education ==
Jin was born in Changshu, Jiangsu. He studied high school in Jiangyin but could not complete his education to bachelor's degree level because of the Cultural Revolution. As a teenager he briefly joined the Red Guards and from 1968 was sent to work in the countryside to grow rice. For three years he did this agricultural work and still continued to study by himself, which led to an appointment as teacher in a local middle school. In 1978 the universities reopened and he entered Beijing Foreign Studies University's Master program, graduating with a Master of Arts in English literature in 1980. He was later a Hubert Humphrey Fellow in the economics graduate program at Boston University from 1987 to 1988. He also studied in the graduate program in economics at George Washington University. He is fluent in both English and French.

== Career ==
In 1980 Jin joined the Ministry of Finance of China's office at the World Bank in Washington, D.C., later becoming Director General of the World Bank Department, and Alternative Executive Director of China to the World Bank Group. He became Vice Minister in 1998. He was a member of the Monetary Policy Committee of the People's Bank of China.

From 2003 to 2008, Jin was vice president, and then ranking vice president, of the Asian Development Bank (ADB), in charge of programs for South, Central and West Asia, and private sector operations.

Jin was the chairman of the supervisory board, China Investment Corporation, from September 2008 to May 2013.

From 2009 to 2012, Jin served first as deputy chairman, and subsequently as chairman of the International Forum of Sovereign Wealth Funds.

Jin was then chairman of China International Capital Corporation, a major Chinese investment banking firm based in Beijing from May 2013 to October 2014.

In October 2014 Jin became secretary-general of the Multilateral Interim Secretariat established to create the AIIB. He became president-designate and in January 2016 he was elected as the president of the AIIB.

Jin is an adjunct professor and doctoral advisor at both Beijing Foreign Studies University and Nankai University.

== Books ==
Jin led the translation work of classic banking history The House of Morgan: An American Banking Dynasty and the Rise of Modern Finance and wrote Economic Development: Theories and Practices in collaboration with Nicholas Stern, then chief economist of the European Bank for Reconstruction and Development. Jin also published a book An Anthology of English Verse as an editor.

== Personal life ==
Jin's daughter is Keyu Jin, an associate professor of economics at the London School of Economics and Political Science.

Positions in intergovernmental organisations
New office	President of the Asian Infrastructure Investment Bank; 2016–2026	Succeeded by Zou Jiayi
