= Streptomyces parvulus =

Scientific classification
- Domain: Bacteria
- Kingdom: Bacillati
- Phylum: Actinomycetota
- Class: Actinomycetes
- Order: Streptomycetales
- Family: Streptomycetaceae
- Genus: Streptomyces
- Species: S. parvulus

Binomial name
- Streptomyces parvulus corrig. Waksman and Gregory 1954 (Approved Lists 1980)

Type strain
- AS 4.0611, ATCC 12434, ATCC 19796, BCRC 12046, BootsFD1327, CBS 418.59, CBS 548.68, CCRC 12046, CGMCC 4.0611, CGMCC 4.1094, CUB 510, DSM 40048, ETH 12648, ETH 14318, ETH 31592, G-376, HUT-6081, ICMP 12845, ICMP 156, IFO 13193, IMET 41380, IMRU 3677, ISP 5048, JCM 4068, JCM 4601, KCC S-0068, KCC S-0601, KCCS-0068, KCCS-0601, Lanoot R-8673, LMG 19312, NBRC 13193, NCIB 11240, NCIMB 11240, NRRL B-1628, NRRL-ISP 5048, PSA 146, R-8673, RIA 1075, RIA 307, RIA 507, UNIQEM 182, VKM Ac-1063, VTT E-991419, Waksman3677, WC 3677

Synonyms
- Streptomyces parvullus Waksman and Gregory 1954 (Approved Lists 1980)

Species of bacterium

Streptomyces parvulus is a bacterium species from the genus of Streptomyces which has been isolated from soil. Streptomyces parvulus produces the peptide antibiotic Actinomycin D and the angiogenesis inhibitor borrelidin and manumycin A, himalomycin A, himalomycin B and kynurenine.

== See also ==
- List of Streptomyces species
