= Dinah Singer =

American immunologist (born 1948)

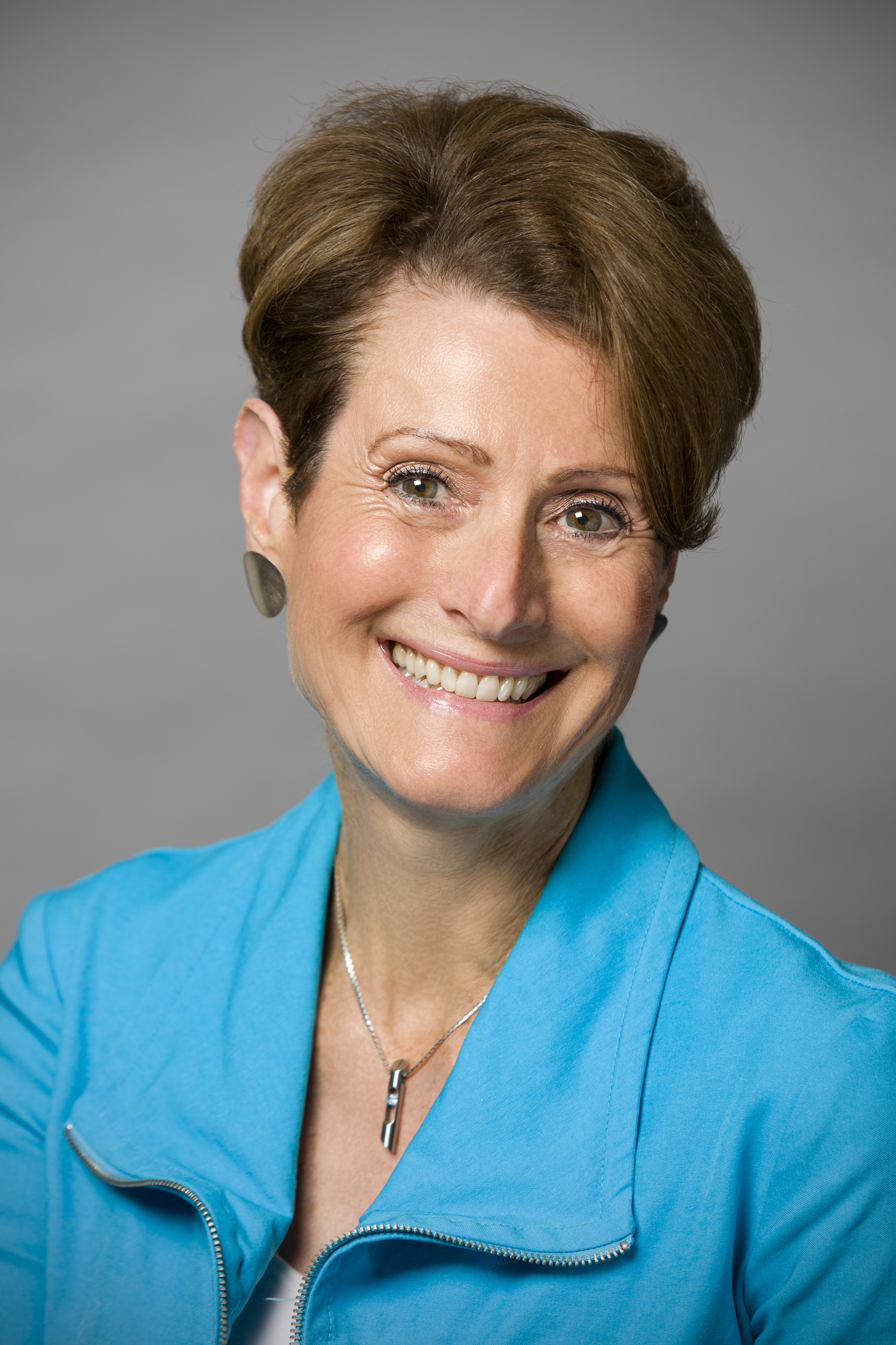
- Born: Dinah Schiffer; 1948 (age 77–78)
- Education: Massachusetts Institute of Technology; Columbia University
- Spouse: Alfred Singer
- Children: 2
- Scientific career
- Workplaces: National Cancer Institute

Dinah Schiffer Singer (born 1948) is an American immunologist specialized in the regulation of transcription in cancer, gene expression, and molecular immunology. She is the deputy director for scientific strategy and development at the National Cancer Institute (NCI). Singer was previously director of the NCI division of cancer biology from 1999 to 2019.

== Education ==
Singer is the daughter of German-Jewish mathematician Menahem Max Schiffer. She completed a B.S. in biology and life sciences at the Massachusetts Institute of Technology (MIT) in 1969. Singer earned a Ph.D. in human genetics and biochemistry at Columbia University. Her 1975 dissertation was titled, Erythropoietic differentiation in murine erythroleukemia cells (Friend). She was a postdoctoral fellow in the National Cancer Institute (NCI) laboratory of biochemistry.

== Career ==
Singer joined NCI in 1975. She served as the director of the NCI Division of Cancer Biology (DCB) from 1999 to 2019, while simultaneously serving as senior investigator and chief of the molecular regulation section of the experimental immunology branch. In 2019, Singer was named NCI's deputy director for scientific strategy and development. She oversees the NCI Center for Strategic Scientific Initiatives, Center for Research Strategy, Center to Reduce Cancer Health Disparities, and Center for Cancer Training.

In early 2020, as part of NCI's response to the COVID-19 pandemic, she led the rapid creation of the Serological Sciences Network (SeroNet) to expand serological testing capacity and research to characterize the immune responses elicited by the SARS-CoV-2 viral infection. Singer co-chaired the Blue Ribbon Panel (BRP) of experts to develop the scientific direction of the Cancer MoonshotSM, a $1.8 billion initiative to accelerate cancer research. She continues to lead NCI's implementation of the Cancer Moonshot, which has resulted in 240 new research activities to address the BRP's recommendations. She has served on the Scientific Advisory Board of Break Through Cancer since 2021.

=== Research ===
Singer's research interests are in the areas of regulation of transcription in cancer, gene expression and molecular immunology. Her research has provided insights into the molecular mechanisms that regulate MHC class I transcription in vivo. Some of her studies have identified BRD4, as a kinase that regulates early transcription, linking mitosis and transcription and TAF7 as a checkpoint regulator of early transcription. Singer's research program was focused on interrogating the regulatory networks governing transcription to generate an integrated understanding of the interplay between promoter elements and transcription complexes that establish appropriate regulation of gene expression across diverse cellular and tissue environments.

== Personal life ==
Schiffer met her future husband, Alfred Singer, in their organic chemistry class at MIT in 1965. They have two sons.
