= Streptomyces heilongjiangensis =

Scientific classification
- Domain: Bacteria
- Kingdom: Bacillati
- Phylum: Actinomycetota
- Class: Actinomycetia
- Order: Streptomycetales
- Family: Streptomycetaceae
- Genus: Streptomyces
- Species: S. heilongjiangensis

Binomial name
- Streptomyces heilongjiangensis Liu et al. 2013

Type strain
- ATCC BAA-2424, CGMCC 4.7004, DSM 42073, NEAU-W2

Species of bacterium

Streptomyces heilongjiangensis is a bacterium species from the genus of Streptomyces which has been isolated from the root surface of the soybean Glycine max in Hulin in the Heilongjiang province in China. Streptomyces heilongjiangensis produces borrelidin.

== See also ==
- List of Streptomyces species
