= Kimryn Rathmell =

American physician-scientist

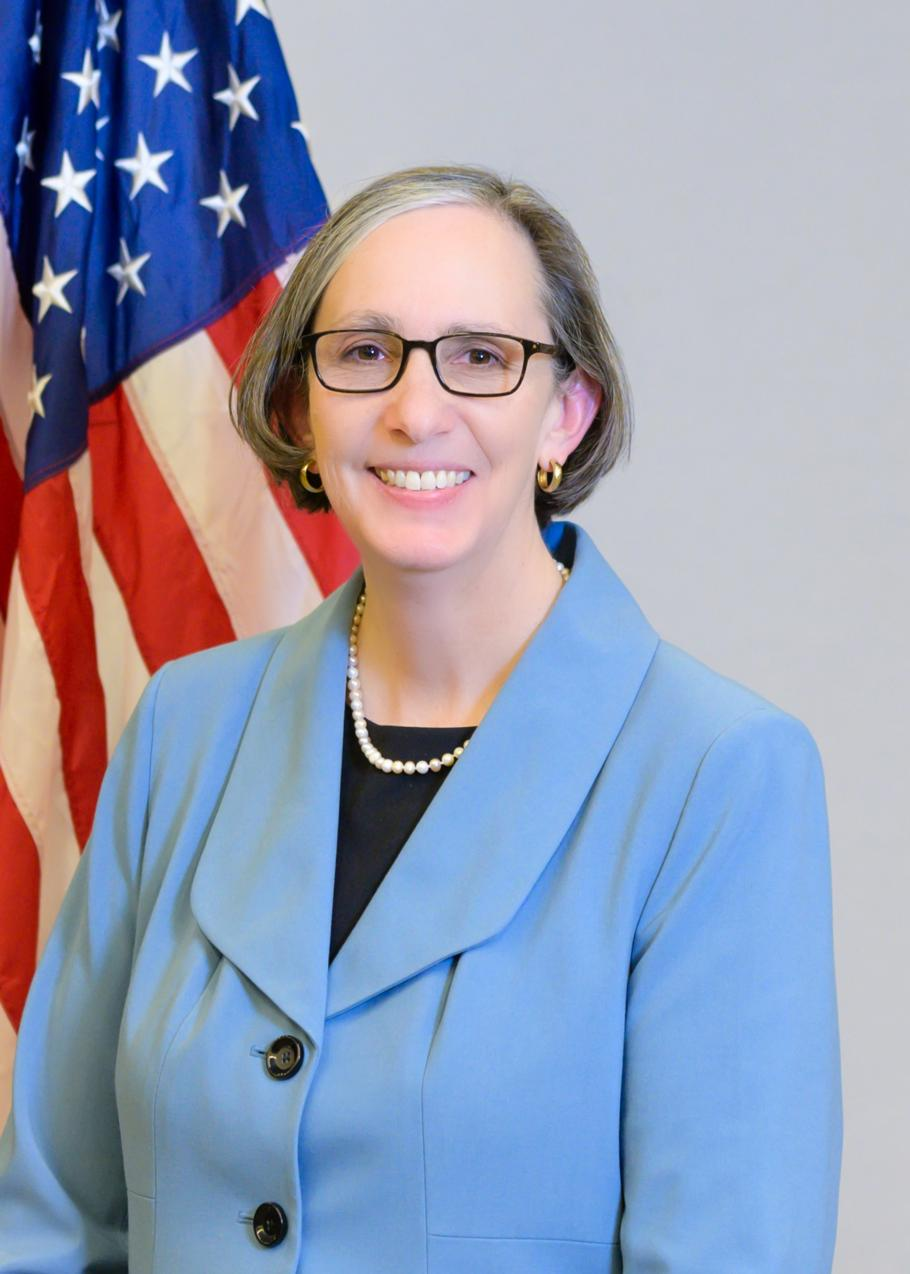
- Rathmell in 2023

17th Director of the National Cancer Institute
- In office December 18, 2023 – January 20, 2025
- President: Joe Biden
- Preceded by: Monica Bertagnolli
- Succeeded by: Anthony Letai

Personal details
- Born: Wendy Kimryn Meyer; November 3, 1969 (age 56) Omaha, Nebraska, U.S.
- Spouse: Jeffrey Rathmell
- Education: University of Northern Iowa (BA, BS); Stanford University (PhD, MD); Vanderbilt University (MS)

Wendy Kimryn Rathmell (born November 3, 1969) is an American physician-scientist whose work focuses on the research and treatment of patients with kidney cancers. She was the 17th Director of the National Cancer Institute from 2023 to 2025, having previously been the Hugh Jackson Morgan Professor and Chair of the Department of Medicine at Vanderbilt University Medical Center (VUMC), and Physician-in-Chief for Vanderbilt University Adult Hospital and Clinics in Nashville, Tennessee. In November 2023, Rathmell was nominated by President Biden as the next Director of the National Cancer Institute and she assumed office on December 18, 2023. She stepped down from her role as director in January 2025. She is the CEO of the James Cancer Hospital in Columbus, Ohio effective May 2025.

== Education ==
In 1991, Rathmell graduated from the University of Northern Iowa with a Bachelor of Science (BS) in Biology and a Bachelor of Arts (BA) in Chemistry. She subsequently earned a Doctor of Philosophy (PhD) in Biophysics in 1996 under the mentorship of Gilbert Chu, and a Doctor of Medicine (MD) in 1998 from Stanford University. The title of her PhD thesis was "Ku and DNA/PK in the repair of DNA double strand breaks." Following completion of her MD, Rathmell did an Internal Medicine internship at the University of Chicago before attending the University of Pennsylvania where she completed her Internal Medicine residency and Medical Oncology fellowship training. Rathmell completed additional postdoctoral training at the University of Pennsylvania under the mentorship of M. Celeste Simon and at the University of North Carolina at Chapel Hill (UNC) under the mentorship of Terry Van Dyke. In 2022, she completed a Master of Management in Health Care at the Owen School of Management at Vanderbilt University.

== Career ==
In 2003, Rathmell joined faculty at UNC where she held primary and secondary appointments in the departments of Medicine and Genetics. While there, she was Co-Director of the Howard Hughes Medical Institute Graduate Training Program in Translational Medicine, Associate Director for Training and Education at UNC Lineberger Comprehensive Cancer Center, and Associate Director of the Medical Scientist Training Program.

In 2015, she joined VUMC as Professor of Medicine and Director of the Division of Hematology and Oncology, with secondary appointments in the departments of Cancer Biology and Biochemistry. Rathmell was successively named Cornelius Abernathy Craig Professor of Medicine. In 2019, she was named Deputy Director for Research Integration and Career Development at Vanderbilt-Ingram Cancer Center. She was appointed as the Hugh Jackson Morgan Professor and Chair of the Department of Medicine and Physician-in-Chief for Vanderbilt University Adult Hospital and Clinics in 2020. She was the second woman Chair of the Department of Medicine at VUMC, and immediately succeeded Nancy J. Brown.

Rathmell has been actively involved in research related to the genetics and molecular biology of complex renal cancers. A member of The Cancer Genome Atlas (TCGA), her research has resulted in more than 200 articles in leading peer-reviewed journals, including The New England Journal of Medicine, Nature, and the Journal of Clinical Investigation.

Prior to her appointment as Director, Rathmell was on the National Cancer Institute's Board of Scientific Advisors, the Keystone Symposia's Board of Directors and the Forbeck Foundation Scientific Board of Directors. She is a former associate editor for the Journal of Clinical Investigation, and recently was senior editor for eLife. She has previously held leadership roles for the American Society of Clinical Oncology, the Department of Defense Congressionally Directed Medical Research Program (Kidney Cancer Research Program), and the American Society for Clinical Investigation (ASCI), in which she was secretary-treasurer and society President in 2019-2020.

Rathmell was recognized with the American Cancer Society's highest honor, the Medal of Honor in 2025. and she received the Stanford University School of Medicine Arthur Kornberg and Paul Berg Lifetime Achievement Award . She is a 2023 recipient of the Doris Duke Foundation's Paragon Award. She received the 2020 American Association for Cancer Research Team Science Award for TCGA, and the 2019 Eugene P. Schonfeld Award for Outstanding Contributions in Kidney Cancer from the Kidney Cancer Association. Rathmell has been elected to the ASCI, the Association of American Physicians, and as fellow of the American Association for the Advancement of Science.

In recognition of her contributions to kidney cancer research and the advancement of the physician-scientist career path, she was elected to the National Academy of Medicine, and in 2023, she was elected to the American Academy of Arts and Sciences.

== Personal life ==
Rathmell resides in Columbus, Ohio, and her husband, Jeffrey Rathmell, a professor and department chair at the University of Chicago Ben May Department of Cancer Research. They have two children.
