= Amy Berrington de González =

Scientist and professor

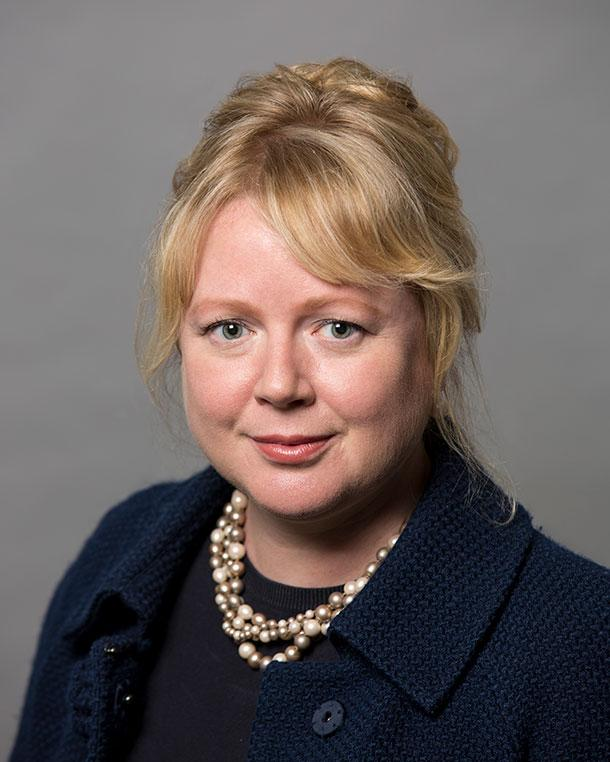
- Education: University of Oxford (DPhil)
- Occupation: Scientist
- Scientific career
- Fields: Radiation epidemiology
- Workplaces: University of Oxford; Johns Hopkins Bloomberg School of Public Health; National Cancer Institute; Institute for Cancer Research
- Thesis: Epidemiological evidence for the risk of cancer from diagnostic X-rays (2001)
- Doctoral advisor: David Cox and Sarah Darby

Amy Berrington de González is a scientist and Professor of Clinical Epidemiology at the Institute of Cancer Research in London, England.

== Education ==
Berrington de González received a D.Phil. in Cancer Epidemiology from the University of Oxford. Her 2001 dissertation was titled Epidemiological evidence for the risk of cancer from diagnostic X-rays. Her university supervisors were Sarah Darby and David Cox.

== Career ==
Berrington de González was on the faculty at the University of Oxford and then Johns Hopkins Bloomberg School of Public Health before moving to the Radiation Epidemiology Branch at the National Cancer Institute (NCI) in 2008. She was awarded NIH scientific tenure in 2012, and was promoted to Branch Chief in 2014.

In 2022, she took up the position of Professor of Clinical Epidemiology at the in London, UK. Berrington de González serves on two radiation risk committees for the National Academy of Science and previously served on the UK Health Protection Agency's Advisory Group on Ionising Radiation, and the UK Breast Screening Programme's Advisory Group. She is currently Vice Chair of the NAS Nuclear and Radiation Studies Board and has participated in many national and international radiation committees. She served on the editorial board for the American Journal of Epidemiology.

Berrington de González is co-PI of the UK Pediatric CT scans cohort, which was the first epidemiological study to suggest a direct link between CT scans and subsequent cancer risk. She also leads studies on the risk of second cancer after proton therapy and other emerging radiotherapy techniques.

== Research ==
The goal of Prof Berrington's research is to quantify the potential cancer risks from this source of radiation exposure in order to provide information for public health and clinical purposes. Her interdisciplinary training in epidemiology and biostatistics allow her to pursue this goal using both theoretical risk projection modeling and also by conducting epidemiological studies of medically exposed populations. The studies vary across the dose-spectrum from low-dose diagnostic and screening procedures to high-dose radiotherapy, with distinct opportunities and challenges in each area.

=== Diagnostic and screening tests ===
Berrington de González has conducted a series of risk projection studies to estimate the potential cancer risks from both diagnostic and screening examinations, including: cardiac stress tests, CT colonography and lung CT screening. To perform these studies she and other collaborators developed the NCI Radiation Risk Assessment Tool (RadRAT), which is interactive computer software that uses state of the art risk projection models to estimate lifetime cancer risks and incorporates Monte Carlo simulation methods to assess the impact of uncertainties in the assumptions and data. She recently became the NCI Principal Investigator for the UK Pediatric CT scans study, which is a retrospective cohort study of 250,000 children who had one or more CT scans as children or adolescents.

=== Therapeutic radiation exposure ===
Berrington de González has conducted a number of studies using the SEER cancer registries to evaluate patterns of second cancers and the second cancer risks related to radiotherapy treatment. She is currently developing a cohort of breast cancer survivors using the electronic medical records from Kaiser Permanente Health Plans to study the late effects of various breast cancer treatments. She is also developing methods to project risks from high-doses of radiation exposure and conducting a pilot study to assess the feasibility of performing the first multi-center study of the second cancer risks from proton therapy and IMRT.

== Awards and honors ==
Berrington de Gonzálezn is an elected member of the American Epidemiological Society.
