= National Cancer Institute =

U.S. health institute

National Cancer Institute (NCI)

Agency overview
- Formed: August 5, 1937; 89 years ago
- Jurisdiction: Federal government of the United States
- Headquarters: Office of the Director, 31 Center Drive, Building 31, Bethesda, Maryland, 20814
- Agency executive: Anthony Letai, Director
- Parent department: United States Department of Health and Human Services
- Parent agency: National Institutes of Health
- Child agencies: NCI Shady Grove Campus; NCI at NIH Bethesda Campus; NCI Frederick Campus
- Website: www.cancer.gov

National Cancer Institute Act
- Long title: An Act to provide for, foster, and aid in coordinating research relating to cancer; to establish the National Cancer Institute; and for other purposes.
- Enacted by: the 75th United States Congress

Citations
- Public law: Pub. L. 75-244
- Statutes at Large: 50 Stat. 559

Legislative history
- Signed into law by President Franklin D. Roosevelt on August 5, 1937

The National Cancer Institute (NCI) coordinates the United States National Cancer Program and is part of the National Institutes of Health (NIH), which is one of eleven agencies that are part of the U.S. Department of Health and Human Services. The NCI conducts and supports research, training, health information dissemination, and other activities related to the causes, prevention, diagnosis, and treatment of cancer; the supportive care of cancer patients and their families; and cancer survivorship.

NCI is the oldest and has the largest budget and research program of the 27 institutes and centers of the NIH ($6.9 billion in 2020). It fulfills the majority of its mission via an extramural program that provides grants for cancer research. Additionally, the National Cancer Institute has intramural research programs in Bethesda, Maryland, and at the Frederick National Laboratory for Cancer Research at Fort Detrick in Frederick, Maryland. The NCI receives more than US$5 billion in funding each year.

The NCI supports a nationwide network of 73 NCI-designated Cancer Centers with a dedicated focus on cancer research and treatment and maintains the National Clinical Trials Network.

== History ==
=== Timeline ===
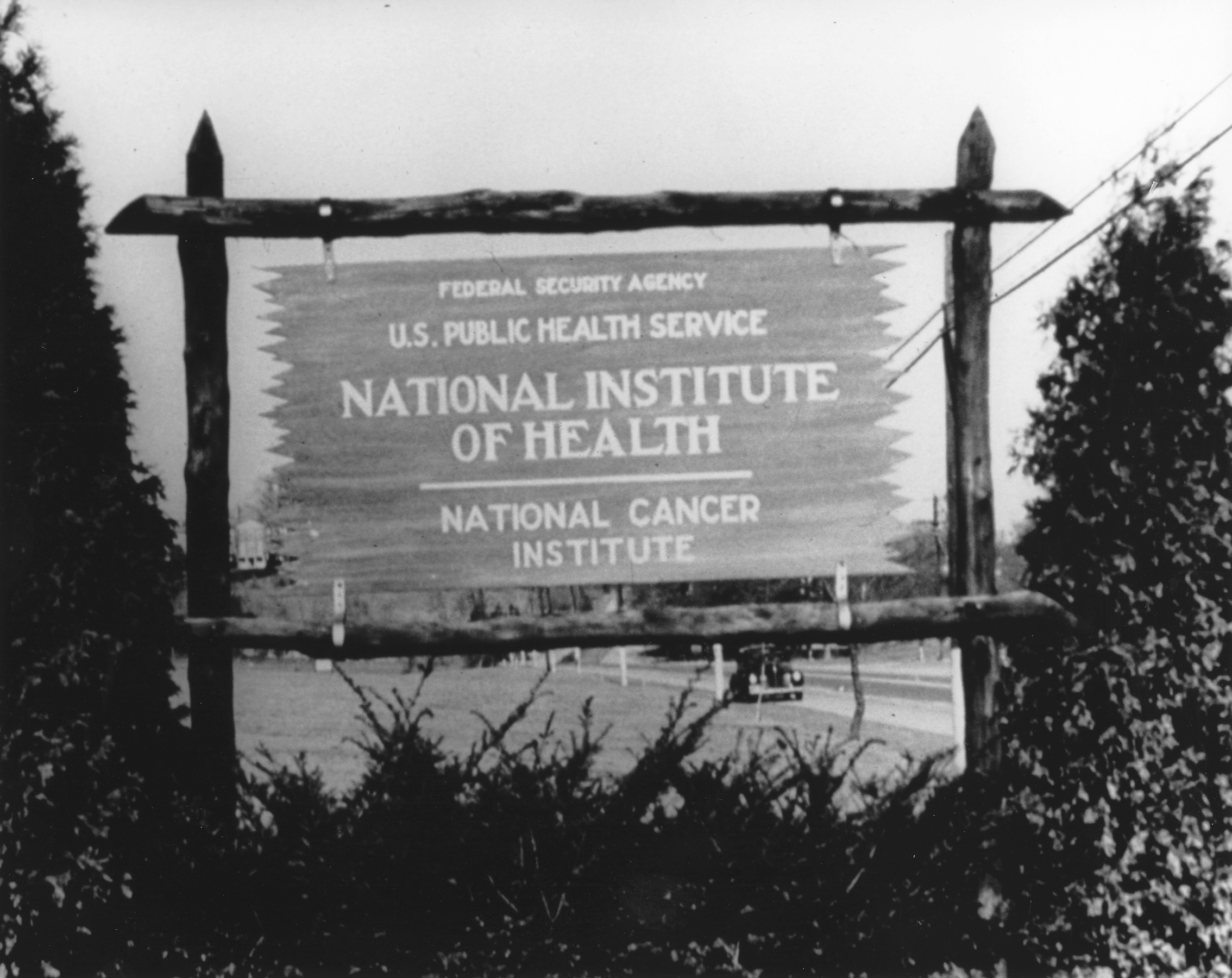
An early wooden sign for the National Cancer Institute

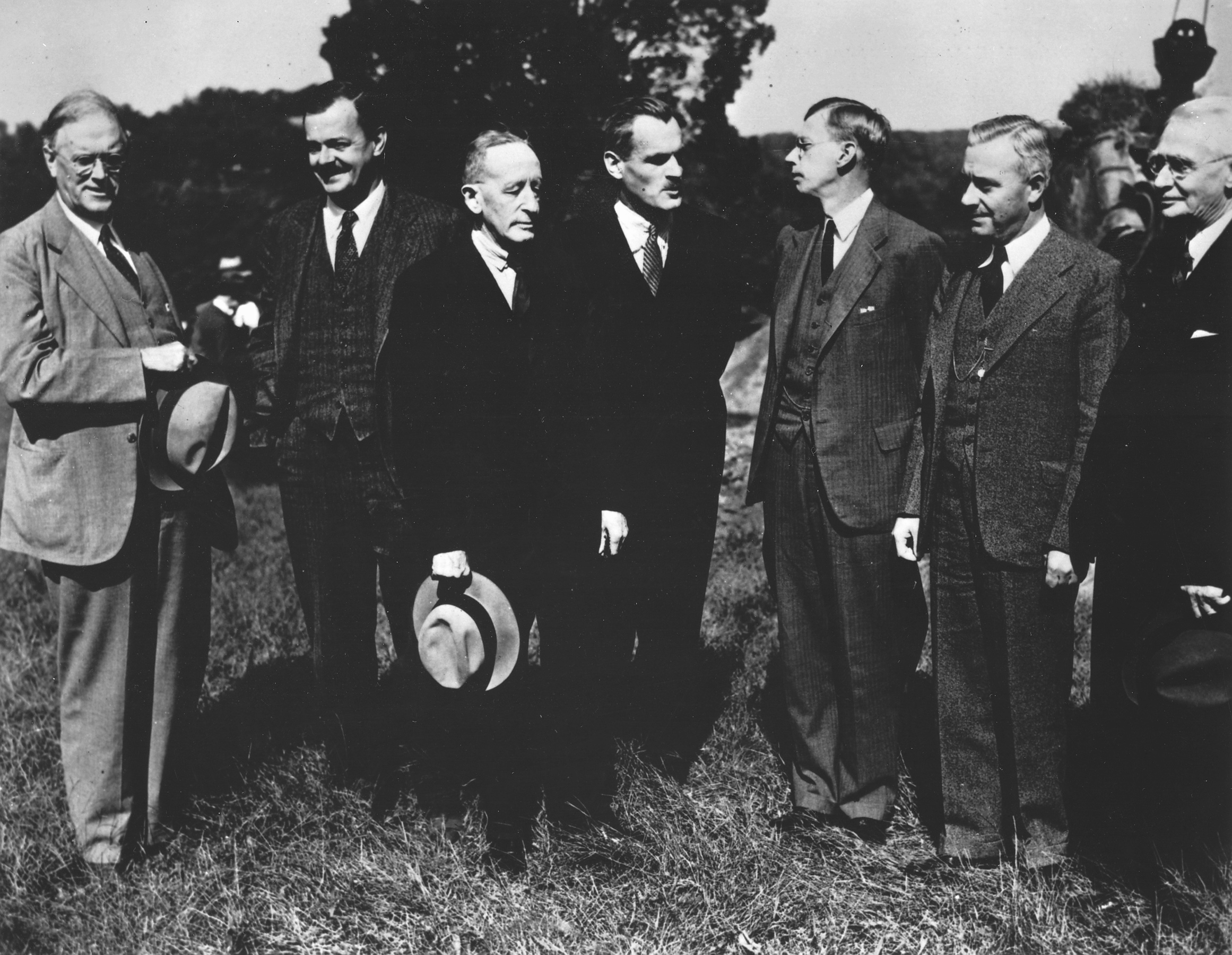
Members of the first National Advisory Cancer Council at the groundbreaking ceremonies of the NCI's building 6 in Bethesda, Maryland (June 1938)

- August 5, 1937: President Franklin D. Roosevelt signed into law the National Cancer Institute Act (Pub. Law 75-244; 50 Stat. 559), which established the National Cancer Institute, as a division of the Public Health Service.
- 1940: The first issue of the Journal of the National Cancer Institute was published.
- 1944: The United States Congress made the NCI an operating division of the National Institutes of Health by its passage of the Public Health Service Act. Congress later amended the Public Health Service Act with the National Cancer Act of 1971, to broaden the scope and responsibilities of the NCI "in order more effectively to carry out the national effort against cancer."
- 1955: NCI established the Clinical Trials Cooperative Group Program, which included several research networks that conducted cancer clinical research primarily under the sponsorship of NCI.
- 1957: The first cancer, choriocarcinoma, was cured with chemotherapy at NCI.
- 1960: NCI began funding government-supported cancer centers.
- 1971: President Richard Nixon converted the U.S. Army's former biological warfare facilities at Fort Detrick, Maryland, to house research activities on the causes, treatment, and prevention of cancer.
- 1971: The National Cancer Act of 1971 declares "war on cancer", establishes the National Cancer Advisory Board, and allots additional funding for cancer research.
- 1975: The Frederick National Laboratory for Cancer Research opened in Frederick, Maryland, as a Federally Funded Research and Development Center
- 1993: The NIH Revitalization Act of 1993 encourages NCI to expand its efforts in prostate cancer, breast and other cancers which primarily or solely affected women, and authorized increased appropriations.
- 1998: Establishes the Office of Cancer Complementary and Alternative Medicine to study pseudoscientific alternative medicine treatments for cancer
- 2009: The American Recovery and Reinvestment Act of 2009 provided US$10 billion in additional funding for the NIH; the NCI received US$1.3 billion from that amount.
- 2016: The 21st Century Cures Act increased funding for biomedical research. The "Cancer Moonshot" program promised additional support for cancer research.
- On October 17, 2017, Norman Sharpless was sworn in as the 15th director of the National Cancer Institute. In April 2019, Sharpless left NCI to serve as the acting Commissioner of Food and Drugs. He returned to the institute in November 2019 as director.

=== Anti-cancer drug investigations ===
Alkylating agents

Cyclophosphamide

- Chlorambucil (Leukeran) (1957)
- Cyclophosphamide (Cytoxan) (1959)
- Thiotepa (1959)
- Melphalan (Alkeran) (1959) (IV in 1993)
- Streptozotocin (Zanosar) (1982)
- Ifosfamide (Ifex) (1988)

Antimetabolites

- Mercaptopurine (1953)
- Methotrexate (1953)
- Thioguanine (1966)
- Cytosine arabinoside (Ara-C) (1969)
- Floxuridine (FUDR) (1970)
- Fludarabine phosphate (1991)
- Pentostatin (1991)
- Chlorodeoxyadenosine (1992)
Plant alkaloids and antibiotics

Vincristine

- Vincristine (Oncovin) (1963)
- Actinomycin D (Cosmegen) (1964)
- Mithramycin (Mithracin) (1970)
- Bleomycin (Blenoxane) (1973)
- Doxorubicin (Adriamycin) (1974)
- Mitomycin C (Mutamycin) (1974)
- L-Asparaginase (Elspar) (1978)
- Daunomycin (Cerubidine) (1979)
- VP-16-213 (Etoposide) (1983)
- VM-26 (Teniposide) (1992)
- Taxol (Paclitaxel) (1992)

Plant flavonoids

- chrysin quercetin galangin naringenin (1994)
Synthetic drugs

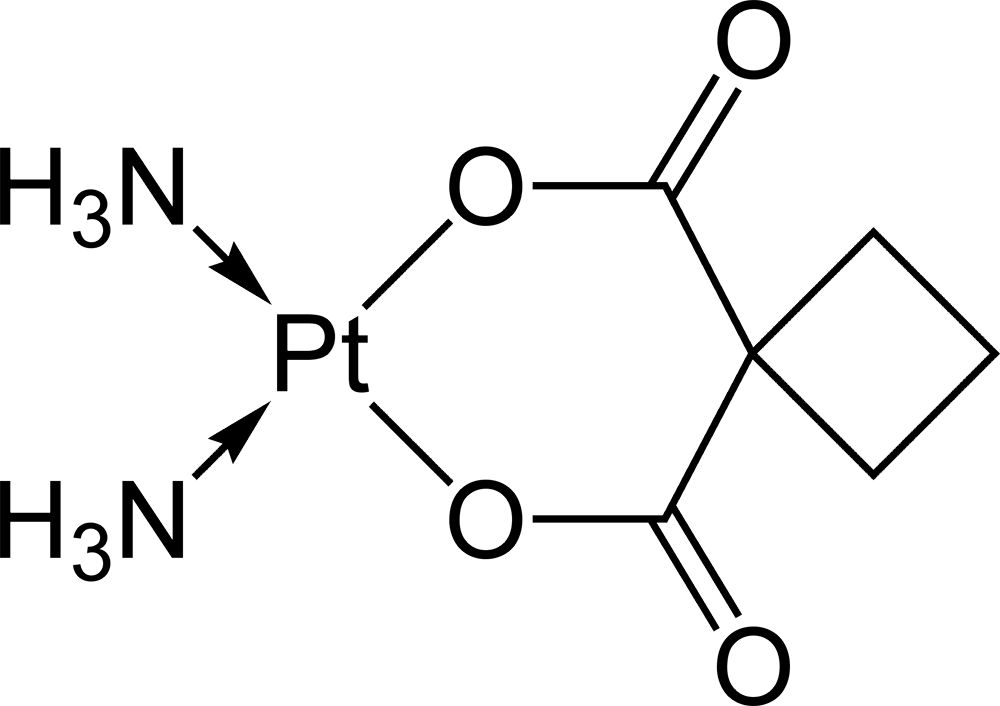
Carboplatin

- Hydroxyurea (Hydrea) (1967)
- Procarbazine (Matulane) (1969)
- O, P'-DDD (Lysodren, Mitotane) (1970)
- Dacarbazine (DTIC) (1975)
- CCNU (Lomustine) (1976)
- BCNU (Carmustine) (1977)
- Cis-diamminedichloroplatinum (Cisplatin) (1978)
- Mitoxantrone (Novantrone) (1988)
- Carboplatin (Paraplatin) (1989)
- Levamisole (Ergamisol) (1990)
- Hexamethylmelamine (Hexalen) (1990)
- All-trans retinoid acid (Vesanoid) (1995)
- Porfimer sodium (Photofrin) (1995)

Hormones and steroids

- DES (1950)
- Prednisone (1953)
- Fluoxymesterone (Halotestin) (1958)
- Dromostanolone (Drolban) (1961)
- Testolactone (Teslac) (1970)
- Methyl prednisolone
- Prednisolone
- Zoladex (1989)

Biologicals

- Alpha interferon (Intron A, Roferon-A) (1986)
- BCG (TheraCys, TICE) (1990)
- G-CSF (1991)
- GM-CSF (1991)
- Interleukin 2 (Proleukin) (1992)

== Organization ==
The NCI is divided into several divisions and centers.

=== Intramural ===
- Center for Cancer Research

The CCR includes approximately 250 internal NCI research groups in Frederick and Bethesda.

- Division of Cancer Epidemiology and Genetics

DCEG is made up of eight branches within the Trans-divisional Research Program.

=== Extramural ===
- Division of Cancer Biology

DCB oversees approximately 2000 grants per year in the areas of cancer cell biology; cancer immunology, hematology, and etiology; DNA and chromosome aberrations; structural biology and molecular applications; tumor biology and microenvironment; and tumor metastasis. "Special Research Programs" falling under the aegis of the DCB include: Physical Sciences-Oncology Network, Cancer Systems Biology Consortium, Oncology Models Forum, Barrett's Esophagus Translational Research Network, New Approaches to Synthetic Lethality for Mutant KRAS-Dependent Cancers, Molecular and Cellular Characterization of Screen-Detected Lesions, Fusion Oncoproteins in Childhood Cancers, and Cancer Tissue Engineering Collaborative.

- Division of Cancer Control and Population Sciences
- Division of Cancer Prevention
- Division of Cancer Treatment and Diagnosis

DCTD supports eight research programs: The Biometric Research Program, The Cancer Diagnosis Program, The Cancer Imaging Program, The Cancer Therapy Evaluation Program, The Developmental Therapeutics Program, The Radiation Research Program, The Translational Research Program, and The Office of Cancer Complementary and Alternative Medicine.

- Division of Extramural Activities

DEA processes and supports the thousands of grant applications NCI receives each year and compiles reports on the progress of research funded by the NCI's programs.

=== Office of the director ===
- Center for Biomedical Informatics and Information Technology
- Center for Cancer Genomics

CCG was created in 2011 and is responsible for management of The Cancer Genome Atlas and cancer genomics initiatives.

- Center for Cancer Training
- Center for Global Health
- Center for Strategic Scientific Initiatives

In the 1990s, the Unconventional Innovation Program was created to integrate interdisciplinary technology research with biological applications. It was reorganized in 2004 as the CSSI.

- Center to Reduce Cancer Health Disparities
- Center for Research Strategy
- Coordinating Center for Clinical Trials
- Technology Transfer Center

== Programs ==
=== NCI-designated Cancer Centers ===
The NCI-designated Cancer Centers are one of the primary arms in the NCI's mission in supporting cancer research. There are currently 73 so-designated centers; 9 cancer centers, 57 comprehensive cancer centers, and 7 basic laboratory cancer centers. NCI supports these centers with grant funding in the form of P30 Cancer Center Support Grants to support shared research resources and interdisciplinary programs. Additionally, faculty at the cancer centers receive approximately 75% of the grant funding awarded by the NCI to individual investigators.

The NCI cancer centers program was introduced in 1971 with 15 participating institutions.

=== National Clinical Trials Network ===
The National Clinical Trials Network (NCTN) was formed in 2014, from the Cooperative Group program to modernize the existing system to support precision medicine clinical trials. With precision medicine, many patients must be screened to determine eligibility for treatments in development.

Lead Academic Participating Sites (LAPS) were chosen at 30 academic institutions for their ability to conduct clinical trials and screen a large number of participants and awarded grants to support the infrastructure and administration required for clinical trials. Most LAPS grant recipients are also NCI-designated cancer centers. NCTN also stores surgical tissue from patients in a nationwide network of tissue banks at various universities.

=== Developmental Therapeutics Program ===
The NCI Development Therapeutics Program (DTP) provides services and resources to the academic and private-sector research communities worldwide to facilitate the discovery and development of new cancer therapeutic agents.

Under the label "Discovery & Development Services" several services are offered, among them the NCI-60 human cancer cell line screen and the Molecular Target Program.

In the Molecular Target Program thousands of molecular targets have been measured in the NCI panel of 60 human tumor cell lines. Measurements include protein levels, RNA measurements, mutation status and enzyme activity levels.

==== NCI-60 Human Tumor Cell Lines Screen ====
The evolution of strategies at the NCI illustrates the changes in screening that have resulted from advances in cancer biology. The Developmental Therapeutics Program (DTP) operates a tiered anti-cancer compound screening program with the goal of identifying novel chemical leads and biological mechanisms. The DTP screen is a three phase screen which includes: an initial screen which first involves a single dose cytotoxicity screen with the 60 cell line assay. Those passing certain thresholds are subjected to a 5 dose screen of the same 60 cell-line panel to determine a more detailed picture of the biological activity. A second phase screen establishes the maximum tolerable dosage and involves in vivo examination of tumor regression using the hollow fiber assay. The third phase of the study is the human tumor xenograft evaluation.

Active compounds are selected for testing based on several criteria: disease type specificity in the in vitro assay, unique structure, potency, and demonstration of a unique pattern of cellular cytotoxicity or cytostasis, indicating a unique mechanism of action or intracellular target.

A high correlation of cytotoxicity with compounds of known biological mechanism is often predictive of the drugs mechanism of action and thus a tool to aid in the drug development and testing. It also tells if there is any unique response of the drug which is not similar to any of the standard prototype compounds in the NCI database.

== Leadership ==
List of NCI directors since 1937:

No.	Portrait	Director	Term start	Term end	Refs.
1		Carl Voegtlin	January 13, 1938	July 31, 1943	
2		Roscoe Roy Spencer	August 1, 1943	July 1, 1947	
3		Leonard Andrew Scheele (Note: Served as the seventh Surgeon General of the United States from 1948 to 1956.)	July 1, 1947	April 6, 1948	
4		John Roderick Heller	May 15, 1948	July 1, 1960	
5		Kenneth Milo Endicott	July 1, 1960	November 10, 1969	
acting		Carl Gwin Baker	November 11, 1969	July 12, 1970	
6		Carl Gwin Baker	July 13, 1970	May 5, 1972	
7		Frank Joseph Rauscher, Jr.	May 5, 1972	November 1, 1976	
8		Arthur Canfield Upton	July 29, 1977	December 31, 1980	
acting		Vincent T. DeVita, Jr.	January 1, 1980	July 8, 1980	
9		Vincent T. DeVita, Jr.	July 9, 1980	September 1, 1988	
10		Samuel Broder	December 22, 1988	April 1, 1995	
11		Richard D. Klausner (Note: 11th Director, left to become President of the Case Institute of Health, Science, and Technology and later Executive Director of Global Health for the Bill & Melinda Gates Foundation.)	August 1, 1995	September 30, 2001	
acting		Alan S. Rabson	October 1, 2001	January 21, 2002	
12		Andrew C. von Eschenbach (Note: 12th Director, served from 2001 to 2006 before transitioning to a role as Commissioner of Food and Drugs.)	January 22, 2002	June 10, 2006	
acting		John E. Niederhuber (Note: 13th Director of the NCI, was nominated by President George W. Bush.)	June 11, 2006	September 14, 2006	
13		John E. Niederhuber	September 15, 2006	July 12, 2010	
14		Harold Varmus (Note: 14th Director of the NCI. Co-winner of the Nobel Prize for studies of the genetic basis of cancer. He was director of the National Institutes of Health from 1993 to 1999.)	July 12, 2010	March 31, 2015	
acting		Douglas R. Lowy	April 1, 2015	October 16, 2017	
15		Norman E. Sharpless (Note: 15th Director of the NCI. Transitioned to acting Commissioner of Food and Drugs in April 2019 and returned to NCI in November 2019.)	October 17, 2017	April 29, 2022	
acting		Douglas R. Lowy	April 30, 2022	October 16, 2022	
16		Monica Bertagnolli (Note: 16th Director of NCI. First woman to hold the position. Became 17th NIH director.)	October 17, 2022	November 9, 2023	
acting		Douglas R. Lowy	November 10, 2023	December 17, 2023	
17		Kimryn Rathmell (Note: 17th Director of NCI.)	December 18, 2023	January 20, 2025	
acting		Douglas R. Lowy	January 21, 2025	September 28, 2025	
18		Anthony Letai	September 29, 2025	present	

Table notes:

== Notable NCI faculty ==
- Amy Berrington de González, senior investigator and radiation epidemiology branch chief.
- Kathryn Zoon, Principal Deputy Director, 2002 to 2004.
- Michael B. Sporn was the Chief of the Laboratory of Chemoprevention, 1978 to 1995.
- Tom Misteli, NIH Distinguished Investigator and Director of the NCI Center for Cancer Research
- Susan Gottesman
- Sankar Adhya
- Ira Pastan
- Elaine Jaffe
- Michael Gottesman
- Robert C. Gallo
- Rosandra N. Kaplan, head of the tumor microenvironment and metastasis branch
- Michael Potter
- Sandra Wolin
- Charles J. Sherr
- Louis M. Staudt
- Gordon Zubrod
- Steven Rosenberg
- Alfred Singer, Chief of the Experimental Immunology Branch of the National Cancer Institute
- Xiaohong Rose Yang, senior investigator.
- Douglas R. Lowy, Chief, Laboratory of Cellular Oncology; NCI Principal Deputy Director, initial development, characterization, and clinical testing of the preventive virus-like particle-based HPV vaccines.

== Notable people ==
- Susan Shurin, senior adviser
- Sudhir Srivastava, chief scientist at Cancer Biomarkers Research Group of the Division of Cancer Prevention
- Catharine West and Barry Rosenstein, lead investigators for the Radio-Genomics Consortium (established 2009)

== See also ==
- American Cancer Society Center
- caBIG, the Cancer BioInformatics Grid, a National Cancer Institute (USA) initiative to link cancer researchers and their data
- Cancer Information Service (CIS)
- European Organisation for Research and Treatment of Cancer (EORTC)
- Journal of the National Cancer Institute
- National Comprehensive Cancer Network
- NCI-designated Cancer Center

== Notes and references ==
=== General references ===
- National Cancer Institute Retrieved 11 June 2010.
- "NCI MISSION STATEMENT". National Cancer Institute. Retrieved 18 August 2004.
- "THE NATIONAL CANCER ACT OF 1971". National Cancer Institute. Retrieved 18 August 2004.
- Developmental Therapeutics Program (DTP)
