= Kathryn Zoon =

American immunologist

Kathryn C. Zoon
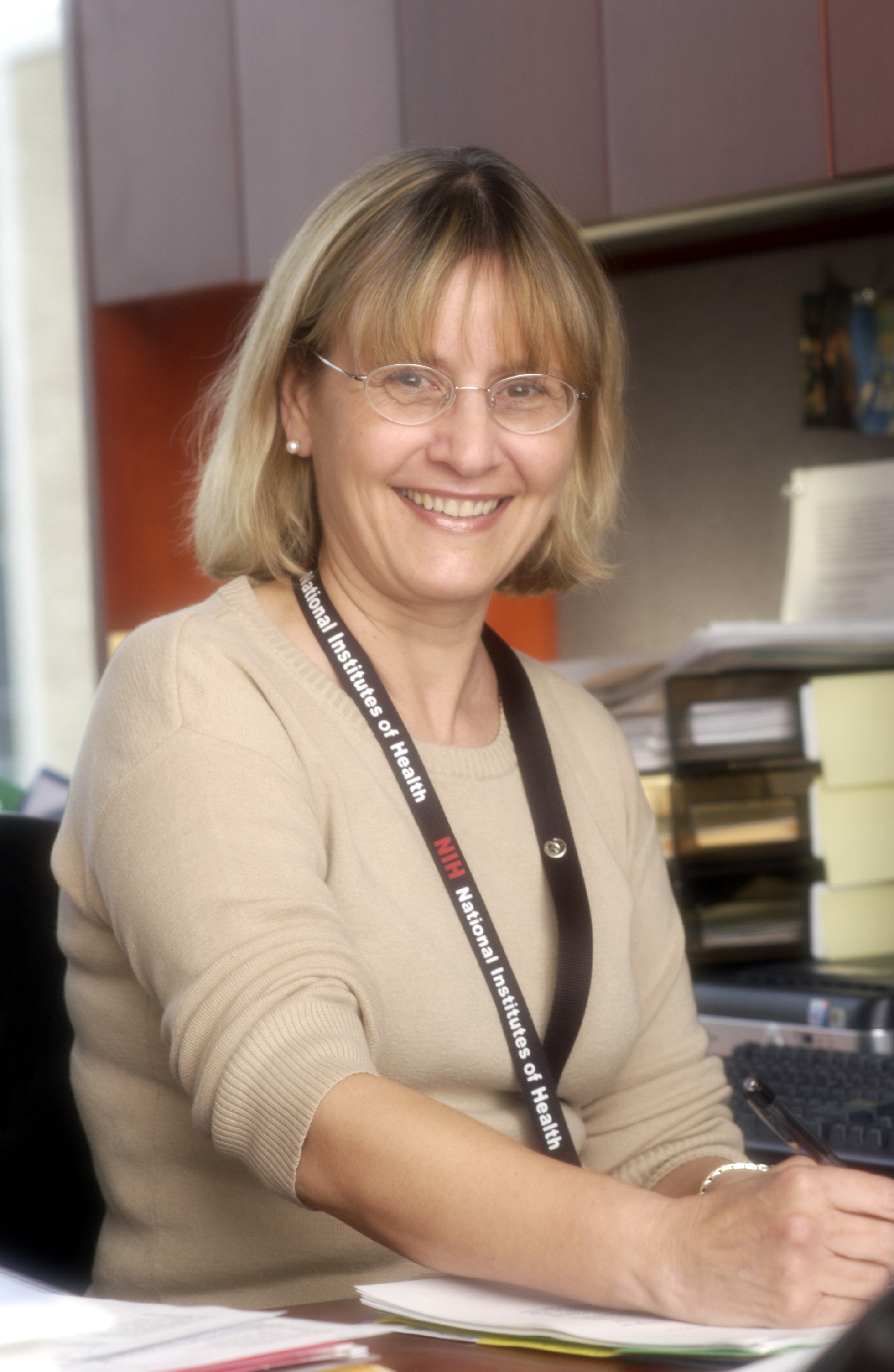
- Born: Kathryn Egloff; Yonkers, New York
- Education: Rensselaer Polytechnic Institute; Johns Hopkins University
- Scientific career
- Fields: immunologist; Scientific administrator
- Workplaces: National Institute of Allergy and Infectious Diseases; National Cancer Institute

Kathryn C. Zoon is a U.S.-based immunologist, elected to the U.S. Institute of Medicine in 2002 for her research on human interferons. She is the former scientific director of the Division of Intramural Research at the National Institute of Allergy and Infectious Diseases (NIAID), National Institutes of Health (NIH) in Bethesda, Maryland. From 1992 to 2002, Zoon was director of the FDA Center for Biologics Evaluation and Research (CBER).

== Life ==
Zoon, née Egloff, was born in Yonkers, New York. She obtained her B.S. cum laude from Rensselaer Polytechnic Institute in 1970 and her Ph.D. in biochemistry from Johns Hopkins University in 1976. Soon after receiving her Ph.D., she undertook a training fellowship in the NIH laboratory of Christian B. Anfinsen, who had won the 1972 Nobel Prize in Chemistry. It was here, in the Anfinsen-led Laboratory of Chemical Biology, that she initiated her studies on interferon, a large class of proteins called cytokines used for communication between cells to trigger the protective defenses of the immune system. In 1979 and 1980 she and her colleagues were the first to report the complete purification and partial characterization, including the terminal amino acid sequence analysis, of a human interferon alpha. The discovery helped launch the biotechnology era, including the cloning and development of new cytokine products for clinical use.

Following her NIH fellowship, Zoon moved to the FDA CBER in 1980 to continue her research on interferon; and, from 1992 to 2002, she served as CBER's director, focusing on developing policies to facilitate the development of biotechnology products, helped to advance the approval of a number of vaccines, and worked to achieve a safer blood supply.

From 2002 to 2004, Zoon was principal deputy director of the Center for Cancer Research at the NIH National Cancer Institute. In 2006 she became the first female scientific director of the NIH NIAID Division of Intramural Research, where she oversees a staff of more than 120 principal investigators who lead research groups composed of staff scientists, physicians, fellows, technical personnel, and students. This includes the NIAID-led Rocky Mountain Laboratories in Hamilton, Montana, a biosafety level 4 facility. Zoon also continues her laboratory research on structure and function of human interferons as chief of NIAID's Cytokine Biology Section. She also is an associate editor of the Journal of Interferon & Cytokine Research and author or co-author of more than 100 publications. She was past president of the International Society for Interferon and Cytokine Research (2000–2001) and serves on the World Health Organization Expert Committee on Biological Standardization, the Malaria Vaccine Initiative Vaccine Science Portfolio Advisory Council, the U.S. Department of Defense Malaria Vaccine Program Scientific Advisory Board, and the U.S. Agency for International Development Vaccine Development Scientific Consultants Group.

== Family ==
Zoon lives with her husband, a retired physicist, in the Washington, D.C., metropolitan area. She has two daughters: Jennifer Zoon, a communications specialist at the National Zoo in Washington, D.C., and Christine Zoon Harris, a surgeon.

== Publications ==
- "Kathryn C. Zoon". Microsoft Academic Search.
