= Office of Cancer Complementary and Alternative Medicine =

Medical research organization in the United States

Office of Cancer Complementary and Alternative Medicine of the NIH
Agency overview
- Formed: 1998; 28 years ago
- Headquarters: Bethesda, Maryland, U.S.
- Annual budget: $105 million (2011)
- Agency executive: Jeffrey D. White, Director
- Parent agency: National Cancer Institute
- Website: OCCAM (archive)

The Office of Cancer Complementary and Alternative Medicine (OCCAM) is an office of the National Cancer Institute (NCI) in the Division of Cancer Treatment and Diagnosis. OCCAM was founded in 1998 and is responsible for NCI's research agenda in pseudoscientific complementary and alternative medicine (CAM), as it relates to cancer prevention, diagnosis, treatment, and symptom management. The OCCAM differs from the National Center for Complementary and Integrative Health (NCCIH, formerly NCCAM or National Center for Complementary and Alternative Medicine) in that it is exclusively focused on cancer, while the NCCIH funds a much broader program of NIH research into CAM for all diseases and disorders. It last produced an annual report in 2011 and spent $105 million on CAM research in 2011.

== Organization ==
OCCAM funds scientists who are interested in researching CAM. Its stated mission is to improve the quality of care for cancer patients, as well as those at risk for cancer and those recovering from cancer treatment. It aims to achieve this by helping advance evidence-based medicine in CAM practice and research. OCCAM also tries to supply reliable information about the possible risks and benefits of alternative medicine to the health care community, scientists, and the general public. OCCAM is organized into three main programs:

- The Research Development and Support Program analyzes the CAM research portfolio, to aid funding and policy decisions. It also advises researchers on how to prepare grant applications based on review committee comments.
- The goal of the Practice Assessment Program is to improve the quality of care of cancer patients by a rigorous scientific evaluation of cancer CAM interventions. The PAP also reviews case summary data from patients who use CAM therapies for the treatment of cancer through the NCI Best Case Series Program. This program tries to identify successful applications of CAM therapies with anti-cancer effects.
- The Communications and Outreach Program aims to acquire and develop high-quality information about cancer and CAM for NCI and for dissemination to the health care community, researchers, patients, and the general public. As of January 2018, the last public lecture communicated was in 2011, the last annual report was published in 2011 and the last semiannual newsletter was produced in 2013.

== Research grant funding ==
OCCAM does not conduct clinical or basic research but sponsors both types with grants. It coordinates NCI's CAM research activities and attempts to assist the growth of CAM research within the NCI. It attempts to integrate with other research in related areas (e.g. nutrition, natural products, and behavioral sciences). As of January 2019, there are no active clinical trials listed on the department's website. The department's budget has grown from $20 million at its start in 1998.

In FY 2011, the last year that an annual report was published, OCCAM supported approximately $105,341,737 million in CAM-related research in 382 projects covering topics such as acupuncture and vitamin C. In 2009 and 2010 the NCI used about $6.5 million each year in funds from the American Recovery and Reinvestment Act (ARRA).

Fiscal Year	NCI's CAM Expenditures	# Projects
2003	$119,900,000	?
2004	$128,671,113	?
2005	$121,076,919	400
2006	$123,076,167	461
2007	$121,932,765	456
2008	$121,264,507	444
2009	$114,441,501+	429
2010	$114,460,116+	406
2011	$105,341,737	382
2012 - 2023	Unknown	?

== May 2016 conference ==
In May 2016, OCCAM held a two-day workshop on the state of CAM on Cancer treatments. The workshop identified many problems specific to CAM research for cancer treatment.

== Criticism ==
A 2005 report in the Journal of Clinical Oncology analyzed the research portfolio of OCCAM and the grant applications it received and identified serious challenges in the design and performance of research into CAM therapies for cancer: notably the lack of standardized products or protocols for CAM therapy and the inherent difficulty in studying products with no known mode of action.

In 2012, the Journal of the American Medical Association (JAMA) published a criticism that study after study had been funded by OCCAMS' sister organization, NCCAM, but these studies "failed to prove that complementary or alternative therapies are anything more than placebos". The JAMA criticism pointed to large wasting of research money on testing scientifically implausible treatments, citing "NCCAM officials spending $406,000 to find that coffee enemas do not cure pancreatic cancer." It was pointed out that negative results from testing were generally ignored by the public, that people continue to "believe what they want to believe, arguing that it does not matter what the data show: They know what works for them". Continued increasing use of CAM products was also blamed on the lack of FDA ability to regulate alternative products, where negative studies do not result in FDA warnings or FDA-mandated changes on labeling, whereby few consumers are aware that many claims of many supplements were found not to be supported.

In 2018, it was shown that cancer patients who choose alternative medicine over proven cancer treatments are more likely to die. Patients who choose herbs, homoeopathy or other alternative treatments are twice as likely to die of cancer.

== See also ==
- National Center for Complementary and Alternative Medicine
- Complementary and Natural Healthcare Council
