= Streptomyces rochei =

Scientific classification
- Domain: Bacteria
- Kingdom: Bacillati
- Phylum: Actinomycetota
- Class: Actinomycetes
- Order: Streptomycetales
- Family: Streptomycetaceae
- Genus: Streptomyces
- Species: S. rochei

Binomial name
- Streptomyces rochei Berger et al. 1953

Type strain
- AS 4.1425, ATCC 10739, ATCC 19245, ATCC 23956, BCRC 13716, BCRC 15102, Berger X-15, CBS 224.46, CBS 939.68, CCRC 13716, CCRC 15102, CCUG 11115, CECT 3329, CGMCC 4.1425, CUB 519, DSM 40231, DSMZ 40231, ETH 13471, ETH 20727, F 7302, Gordon 3602, HAMBI 2114, HMGB B 967, IAW 117, ICMP 490, ICMP 918, IFM 1188, IFO 12908, IMET 41386, IMRU 3602, IMSNU 21081, ISP 5231, JCM 4074, JCM 4668, KACC 20022, KCC S-0074, KCC S-0668, KCTC 19060, Lanoot R-8674, LMG 19313, NBRC 12908, NRRL 3533, NRRL B-1559, NRRL B-2410, NRRL B-3533, NRRL-ISP 5231, NZRCC 10342, PSA 83, R-8674, RIA 1171, VKM Ac-997, VTT E-991423, Waksman 3602, X-15

Synonyms
- "Actinomyces rochei" (Berger et al. 1953) Preobrazhenskaya et al. 1957; Streptomyces enissocaesilis (ex Krassilnikov 1970) Sveshnikova 1986; Streptomyces geysiriensis Wallhäusser et al. 1966 (Approved Lists 1980); Streptomyces plicatus Pridham et al. 1958 (Approved Lists 1980); Streptomyces vinaceusdrappus Pridham et al. 1958 (Approved Lists 1980)

Species of bacterium

Streptomyces rochei is a bacterium species from the genus of Streptomyces which has been isolated from soil in Russia. Streptomyces rochei produces borrelidin, butyrolactol A, butyrolactol B, uricase and streptothricin. Streptomyces rochei has antifungal activity against Fusarium oxysporum f.sp. lycopersici and Aspergillus fumigatus. Streptomyces rochei produces moenomycin and bambermycin. Streptomyces rochei produces amicetin A, amicetin B, amicetin C and streptolin. Streptomyces rochei produces endo-β-N-acetylglucosaminidase mithramycin, amicetin, bamicetin, and plicacetin.

== See also ==
- List of Streptomyces species
