= Menahem Max Schiffer =

German-born American mathematician

Menahem Max Schiffer (24 September 1911, Berlin – 11 November 1997) was a German-born American mathematician who worked in complex analysis, partial differential equations, and mathematical physics.

== Biography ==
Menachem Max Schiffer studied physics from 1930 at the University of Bonn and then at the Humboldt University of Berlin with Max von Laue, Erwin Schrödinger, Walter Nernst, Erhard Schmidt, Issai Schur and Ludwig Bieberbach. In Berlin he worked closely with Issai Schur. In 1934, after being forced by the Nazis to leave the academic world, he immigrated to Mandatory Palestine.

On the basis of his prior mathematical publications, Schiffer received a master's degree from the Hebrew University of Jerusalem. In 1938, he received his doctorate under the supervision of Michael Fekete. In his dissertation on Conformal representation and univalent functions he introduced the "Schiffer variation", a method for handling geometric problems in complex analysis.

Schiffer married Fanya Rabinivics Schiffer in 1937. His daughter, Dinah S. Singer, is an experimental immunologist.

== Academic career ==
In September 1952, he began to teach at Stanford University, along with George Pólya, Charles Loewner, Stefan Bergman, and Gábor Szegő.

With Paul Garabedian, Schiffer worked on the Bieberbach conjecture with a proof in 1955 of the special case n=4. He was a speaker at the International Congress of Mathematicians (ICM) in 1950 at Cambridge, Massachusetts, and was a plenary speaker at the ICM in 1958 at Edinburgh with plenary address Extremum Problems and Variational Methods in Conformal Mapping. In 1970 he was elected to the United States National Academy of Sciences. He retired from Stanford University as professor emeritus in 1977.

In 1981, Schiffer became a founding member of the World Cultural Council.

Never losing his interest in mathematical physics, Schiffer also made important contributions to eigenvalue problems, to partial differential equations, and to the variational theory of “domain functionals” that arise in many classical boundary value problems. And he coauthored a book on general relativity. Schiffer was a prolific author over his entire career, with 135 publications from the 1930s to the 1990s, including four books and around forty different coauthors. He was also an outstanding mathematical stylist, always writing, by his own testimony, with the reader in mind. ... His lectures at Stanford and around the world ranged greatly in subject matter and were widely appreciated. ... At Stanford he often taught graduate courses in applied mathematics and mathematical physics. Students from all departments flocked to them, as did many faculty. Each lecture was a perfect set piece—no pauses, no slips, and no notes. In 1976 he was chosen as one of the first recipients of the Dean's Award for Teaching in the School of Humanities and Sciences.

== Selected publications ==
- with Leon Bowden: The role of mathematics in science, Mathematical Association of America 1984
- with Stefan Bergman: Kernel functions and elliptic differential equations in mathematical physics, Academic Press 1953
- with Donald Spencer: Functionals of finite Riemann Surfaces, Princeton 1954
- with Ronald Adler, Maurice Bazin: Introduction to General Relativity, McGraw Hill 1965 xvi+ 451 pp. Illus. 2nd edition. 1975; xiv+ 549 pp.
