= Butyrolactol A =

Chemical compound

Names
- IUPAC name 3,4-Dihydroxy-5-[(8E,10E,14Z,16E)-1,2,3,4,5-Pentahydroxy-6,20,20-trimethylhenicosa-8,10,14,16-tetraenyl]oxolan-2-one

Identifiers
CAS Number	145144-32-7
3D model (JSmol)	Interactive image
ChEBI	CHEBI:220505
ChemSpider	4942893
PubChem CID	6438414
UNII	3Y3D5WM6X7
- InChI: InChI=1S/C28H46O9/c1-18(16-14-12-10-8-6-5-7-9-11-13-15-17-28(2,3)4)19(29)20(30)21(31)22(32)23(33)26-24(34)25(35)27(36)37-26/h7-14,18-26,29-35H,5-6,15-17H2,1-4H3/b9-7-,10-8+,13-11+,14-12+ Key: YHNIVBVCOOBXOO-FEECMKHQSA-N
- SMILES: CC(C/C=C/C=C/CC/C=C\C=C\CCC(C)(C)C)C(C(C(C(C(C1C(C(C(=O)O1)O)O)O)O)O)O)O

Properties
Chemical formula	C_{28}H_{46}O_{9}
Molar mass	526.667 g·mol^{−1}
- Except where otherwise noted, data are given for materials in their standard state (at 25 °C [77 °F], 100 kPa). Infobox references

Butyrolactol A is a polyketide featuring a tert-butyl group linked to a long hydrophobic carbon chain followed by 8 polyol groups. It is one of a number of potentially useful substances derived from the bacteria Streptomyces rochei.

Research has shown that, using isotopic labeling of media and spectroscopic techniques to identify precursor products which are eventually incorporated into the final product, it can be created via a biosynthetic pathway. Further analysis of gene clusters encoding for biosynthetic enzymes confirmed the presence of polyketide synthesizing genes that are involved with the aforementioned pathways for this molecule.

Butyrolactol A is also of interest for its potential use as an antifungal antibiotic.

== Biosynthesis ==
=== Acetate pathway ===
The long carbon chain contained in Butyrolactol A was determined to originate from the acetate pathway by carbon-14 labeling acetate, the two carbon precursor for polyketide synthase. The presence of PKS genes from the Streptomyces family further confirmed the mechanism of acetyl-group based chain elongation. Carbons 1-8 were confirmed to originate from glycolytic pathway intermediate hydroxymalonyl-ACP (Figure). This is supported by ^{13}C labeling, where ^{13}C-^{13}C couplets were present for the aforementioned carbons, as well as gene sequencing, which found genes coding for enzymes involved in hydroxymalonyl-ACP formation in zwittermicin biosynthesis.

=== tert-Butyl group ===
The tert-butyl functional group is a unique moiety in this compound: two of the three carbons were found to originate from the amino acid valine, which contains an isopropyl alkyl side chain. This was determined by deuteration of valine supplied in the media, where mass spectroscopy identified mass/charge ratio reflecting the replacement of 8 hydrogens with deuterium in valine. The final alkyl group in the tert-butyl group was found to be from methionine, likely from SAM. The order in which these precursor units are synthesized has not been confirmed.

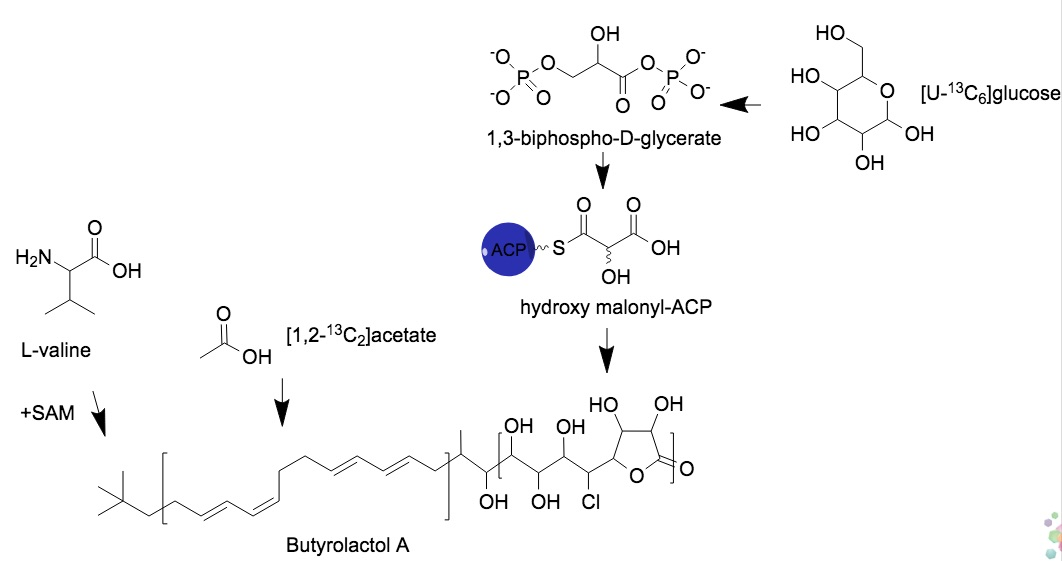
The biosynthetic pathway for butyrolactol A

== Antimicrobial activity ==
Butyrolactol A shows broad in vitro antimicrobial activity against fungi, including Candida albicans, Cryptococcus neoformans, and Aspergillus fumigatus.

Butyrolactol A has also been shown to work synergistically in vitro with the antifungal agent caspofungin against Cryptococcus neoformans, which are typically resistant to echinocandins. This synergistic effect is attributed to inhibition of phospholipid transport, which increases cellular uptake and enhances the antifungal activity of caspofungin.
