= Alfred Singer =

American immunologist

- Born: December 10, 1946 (age 79)
- Citizenship: American
- Occupation: American immunologist
- Employer(s): the National Institutes of Health & the National Cancer Institute.

Alfred Singer (born December 10, 1946) is an American immunologist who works at the National Institutes of Health (NIH), where he is the Chief of the Experimental Immunology Branch of the National Cancer Institute (NCI) Center for Cancer Research. He is best known for his work regarding lymphocyte development, particularly the differentiation of immature CD4+8+ (double positive) thymocytes into mature T cells. Singer's work is foundational in the understanding of T cells and MHC-restricted antigen recognition.

Singer's work explores the mechanisms with which a body identifies what is self and what is not self. At a time when many researchers understood that T cells recognize self through identification of the major histocompatibility complex (MHC) it was not understood how T cells acquire that capability. Using a unique approach to thymus transplantation, Singer showed that it is the thymus that educates self-recognition specificity in T cells. A series of later studies in Singer's lab demonstrated that the property of self-recognition in T cells is acquired during development in the thymus rather than predetermined prior to development or genetically encoded in the genome.

== Biography ==
Singer was raised in Port Jervis, New York, the eldest son of a baker. He studied philosophy at the Massachusetts Institute of Technology, where he received his BS in 1968 and met his wife, Dinah Singer. He received his MD from the Columbia University College of Physicians & Surgeons and was a fellow in immunology at the Rockefeller University before joining the NCI as a clinical associate in the Immunology Branch in 1975. In 1982, Singer established the Experimental Immunology Branch, of which he remained the branch chief.

== Selected publications ==
- Singer A, Hathcock KS, Hodes RJ: Self recognition in allogeneic thymic chimeras. Self recognition by T helper cells from thymus-engrafted nude mice is restricted to the thymic H-2 haplotype. The Journal of Experimental Medicine. 155 (1): 339–344, 1982
- Mu J, Tai X, Iyer SS, Wiessman JD, Singer A, Singer DS: Regulation of MHC class I expression by Foxp3 and its effect on regulatory T cell function. Journal of Immunology. 192: 2892–903, 2014.
- Tai X, Erman B, Alag A, Mu J, Kimura M, Katz G, Guinter T, McCaughtry T, Etzensperger R, Feigenbaum L, Singer DS, Singer A: Foxp3 transcription factor is proapoptotic and lethal to developing regulatory T cells unless counterbalanced by cytokine survival signals. Immunity. 38: 1116–28, 2013.
- Kimura MY, Pobezinsky LA, Guinter TI, Thomas J, Adams A, Park JH, Tai X, Singer A: IL-7 signaling must be intermittent, not continuous, during CD8+ T cell homeostasis to promote cell survival instead of cell death. Nature Immunology. 14: 143–51, 2013.
- Van Laethem F, Tikhonova AN, Pobezinsky LA, Tai X, Kimura MY, Le Saout C, Guinter TI, Adams A, Sharrow SO, Bernhardt G, Feigenbaum L, Singer A: Lck availability during thymic selection determines the recognition specificity of the T cell repertoire. Cell. 154: 1326–41, 2013.
- SInger A, Adoro S, Park JH: Lineage fate and intense debate: myths, models and mechanisms of CD4- versus CD8-lineage choice. Nature Reviews Immunology. 2008 Oct; 8(10): 788–801. doi 10.1038/nri2416.
