= Anthony Letai =

American cancer researcher and oncologist

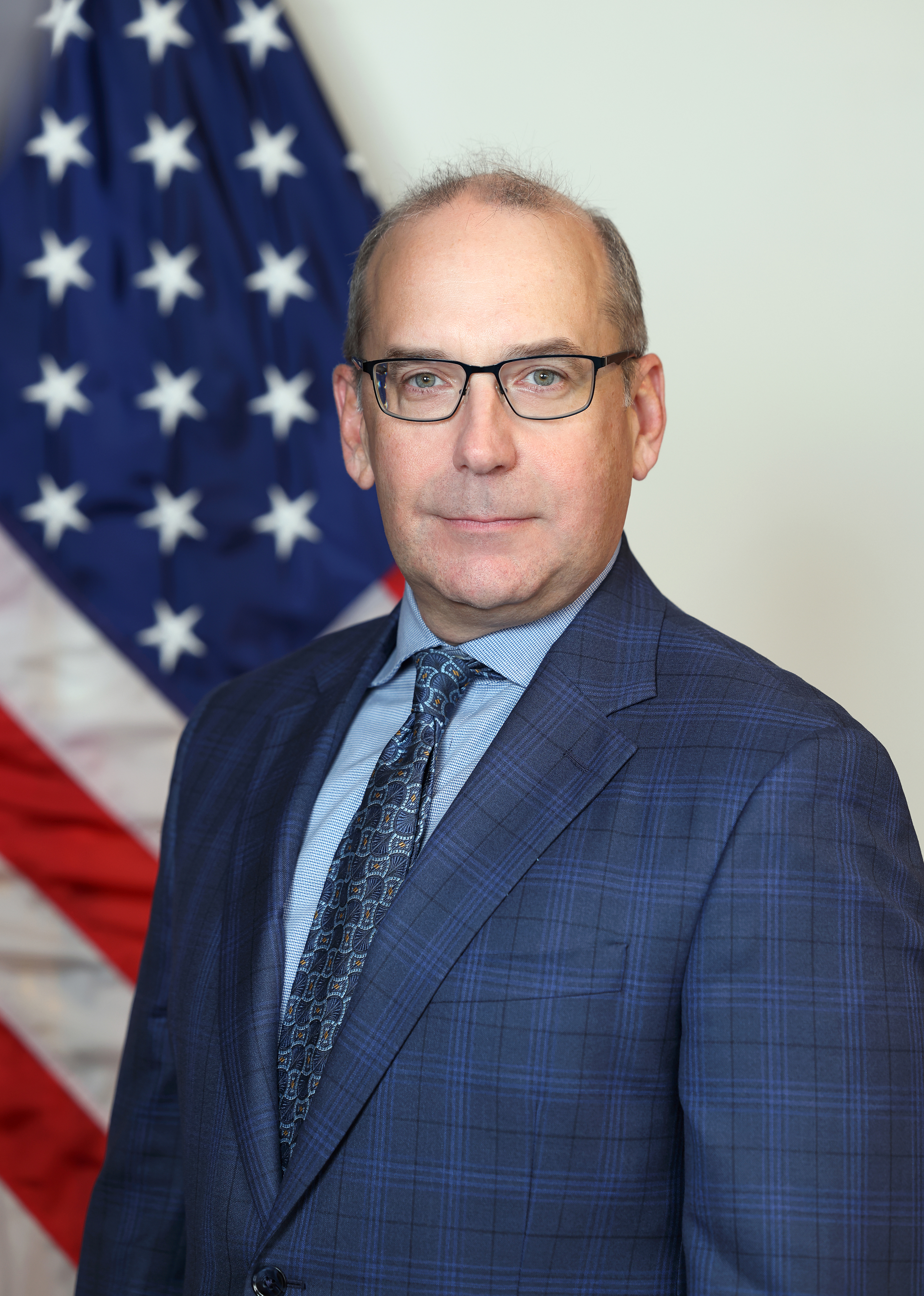

Anthony George Letai is an American cancer researcher and oncologist serving as the director of the National Cancer Institute since 2025. He studies cell death in cancer, developing treatments, and identifying predictive biomarkers. Letai was a professor of medicine at Harvard Medical School and a medical oncologist at the Dana–Farber Cancer Institute.

== Education ==
Letai earned a B.A. in physics from Princeton University. He received an M.D. (1995) and Ph.D. (1993) from the University of Chicago Pritzker School of Medicine. He completed his Ph.D. on the molecular basis of heritable blistering diseases before residency in internal medicine at Brigham and Women's Hospital and a clinical fellowship in hematology and oncology at Dana–Farber Cancer Institute. Letai began his studies of programmed cell death in cancer in a post-doctoral fellowship before establishing his laboratory at Dana–Farber Cancer Institute to study how apoptosis can be evaded by cancer cells. He founded the Society for Functional Precision Medicine (SFPM) dedicated to improve patient care and outcomes by facilitating implementation of functional assays into clinical cares. He served as President of the SFPM until becoming NCI Director in 2025.

== Personal life ==
Letai and his wife, Jean, have three children. Their daughter, Julie is a member of U.S. Speedskating's Short Track World Tour Team, and represented Team USA at the 2022 and 2026 Winter Olympics.
