= Plicamycin =

Antibiotic

Clinical data
- Other names: Aureolic acid; Mithracin; Antibiotic LA 7017; Mithramycin A; Mitramycin; Plicatomycin
- AHFS/Drugs.com: Micromedex Detailed Consumer Information
- Routes of administration: Intravenous
- ATC code: L01DC02 (WHO)

Legal status
- Legal status: US: ℞-only; discontinued

Identifiers
- IUPAC name: (1S)-5-deoxy-1-C-((2S,3S)-7-{[2,6-dideoxy-3-O-(2,6-dideoxy-β-D-arabino-hexopyranosyl)-β-D-arabino-hexopyranosyl]oxy}-3-{[2,6-dideoxy-3-C-methyl-β-D-ribo-hexopyranosyl-(1→3)-2,6-dideoxy-β-D-arabino-hexopyranosyl-(1→3)-2,6-dideoxy-β-D-arabino-hexopyranosyl]oxy}-5,10-dihydroxy-6-methyl-4-oxo-1,2,3,4-tetrahydroanthracen-2-yl)-1-O-methyl-D-xylulose
- CAS Number: 18378-89-7
- PubChem CID: 5284610
- DrugBank: DB06810
- ChemSpider: 4447655
- UNII: NIJ123W41V
- KEGG: D00468
- ChEBI: CHEBI:31856
- ChEMBL: ChEMBL509846
- CompTox Dashboard (EPA): DTXSID6023492
- ECHA InfoCard: 100.162.065

Chemical and physical data
- Formula: C_{52}H_{76}O_{24}
- Molar mass: 1085.156 g·mol^{−1}
- 3D model (JSmol): Interactive image
- SMILES: CO[C@H](C(=O)[C@@H](O)[C@@H](C)O)C1Cc2cc3cc(O[C@H]4C[C@@H](O[C@H]5C[C@@H](O)[C@H](O)[C@@H](C)O5)[C@@H](O)[C@@H](C)O4)c(C)c(O)c3c(O)c2C(=O)[C@H]1O[C@H]1C[C@@H](O[C@H]2C[C@@H](O[C@H]3C[C@](C)(O)[C@H](O)[C@@H](C)O3)[C@H](O)[C@@H](C)O2)[C@H](O)[C@@H](C)O1
- InChI: InChI=1S/C52H76O24/c1-18-29(72-34-14-30(43(58)21(4)68-34)73-33-13-28(54)42(57)20(3)67-33)12-26-10-25-11-27(49(66-9)48(63)41(56)19(2)53)50(47(62)39(25)46(61)38(26)40(18)55)76-36-16-31(44(59)23(6)70-36)74-35-15-32(45(60)22(5)69-35)75-37-17-52(8,65)51(64)24(7)71-37/h10,12,19-24,27-28,30-37,41-45,49-51,53-61,64-65H,11,13-17H2,1-9H3/t19-,20-,21-,22-,23-,24-,27?,28-,30-,31-,32-,33+,34+,35+,36+,37+,41+,42-,43+,44-,45-,49+,50+,51-,52+/m1/s1; Key:CFCUWKMKBJTWLW-GWRQQDNDSA-N

Plicamycin (INN, also known as mithramycin; trade name Mithracin) is an antineoplastic antibiotic produced by Streptomyces plicatus. It is an RNA synthesis inhibitor. The manufacturer discontinued production in 2000. Several different structures are currently reported in different places all with the same chromomycin core, but with different stereochemistry in the glycoside chain, a 1999 study has re-investigated the compound and proposed a revised structure.

== Uses ==
Plicamycin has been used in the treatment of testicular cancer, Paget's disease of bone, and, rarely, the management of hypercalcemia.

Plicamycin has been tested in chronic myeloid leukemia.

Plicamycin is currently used in multiple areas of research, including cancer cell apoptosis and as a metastasis inhibitor.

One elucidated pathway shows it interacts by cross-binding chromatin GC-rich promoter motifs, thereby inhibiting gene transcription.
