= Borrelidin =

Chemical compound

Identifiers
- IUPAC name: (1R,2R)-2-[(2S,4E,6Z,8R,9S,11R,13S,15S,16S)-7-Cyano-8,16-dihydroxy-9,11,13,15-tetramethyl-18-oxo-1-oxacyclooctadeca-4,6-dien-2-yl]cyclopentane-1-carboxylic acid
- CAS Number: 7184-60-3
- PubChem CID: 6436801
- IUPHAR/BPS: 11306
- ChemSpider: 4941412
- UNII: PWC22KGM2P
- KEGG: C15687
- ChEMBL: ChEMBL70590
- ECHA InfoCard: 100.242.694

Chemical and physical data
- Formula: C_{28}H_{43}NO_{6}
- Molar mass: 489.653 g·mol^{−1}
- 3D model (JSmol): Interactive image
- SMILES: C[C@H]1C[C@H](C[C@@H]([C@H](/C(=C\C=C\C[C@H](OC(=O)C[C@@H]([C@H](C1)C)O)[C@@H]2CCC[C@H]2C(=O)O)/C#N)O)C)C
- InChI: InChI=InChI=1S/C28H43NO6/c1-17-12-18(2)14-20(4)27(32)21(16-29)8-5-6-11-25(22-9-7-10-23(22)28(33)34)35-26(31)15-24(30)19(3)13-17/h5-6,8,17-20,22-25,27,30,32H,7,9-15H2,1-4H3,(H,33,34)/b6-5+,21-8-/t17-,18+,19-,20-,22+,23+,24-,25-,27+/m0/s1; Key:OJCKRNPLOZHAOU-UGKRXNSESA-N

Borrelidin is an 18-membered polyketide macrolide derived from several Streptomyces species. First discovered in 1949 from Streptomyces rochei, Borrelidin shows antibacterial activity by acting as an inhibitor of threonyl-tRNA synthetase and features a nitrile moiety, a unique functionality in natural products. Borrelidin also exhibits potent angiogenesis inhibition, which was shown in a rat aorta matrix model. Other studies have been performed to show that low concentrations of borrelidin can suppress growth and induce apoptosis in malignant acute lymphoblastic leukemia cells. Borredlidin's antimalarial activity has also been shown in vitro and in vivo.

== Biosynthesis ==
The core structure of borrelidin is biosynthesized by type I polyketide synthase (PKS), followed by post-PKS modifications. Six genes (borA1 to borA6) encode the type I PKS, composed of a loading domain and six extending modules, rather than the expected eight. Each extension module consists of the ketosynthase (KS) condensing an extender unit, either malonyl-CoA or methylmalonyl-CoA, that is loaded by the acyl transferase (AT) onto the growing polyketide, which can then be modified by further enzymes. Tailoring enzymes of type I PKS that can be involved in each module are ketoreductase (KR), dehydratase (DH), and enoyl reductase (ER). Once polyketide has gone through all of the chain extensions, it can then be released via cyclization by the thioesterase (TE).

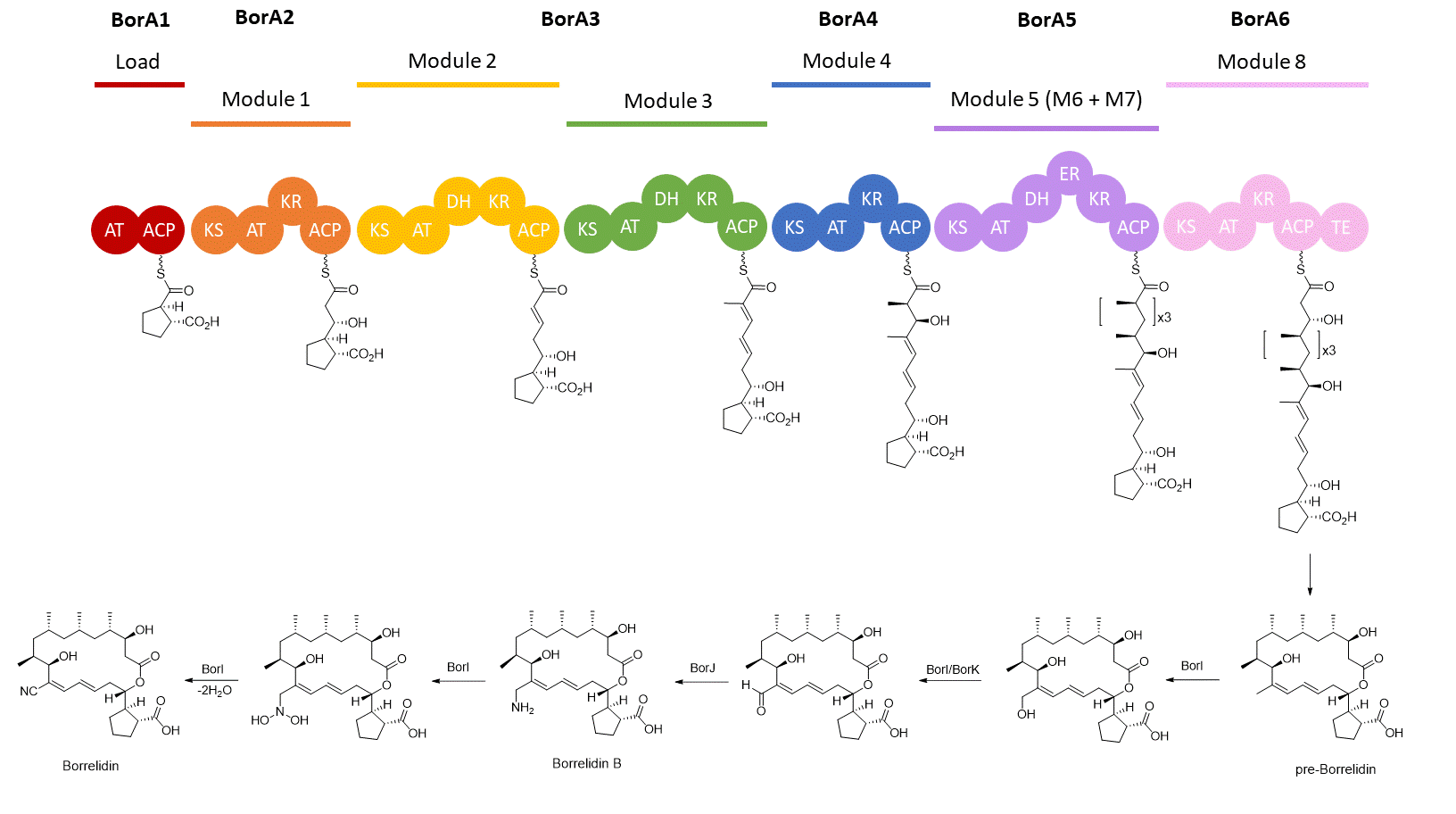
The proposed biosynthetic pathway to borrelidin: AT, acyl transferase; ACP, acyl carrier protein; KS, ketosynthase; KR, ketoreductase; DH, dehydratase; ER, enoyl reductase; TE, thioesterase

Starting with a cyclopentane carboxylic acid starter unit that is loaded onto the acyl carrier protein, ACP, in BorA1, the polyketide intermediate, tethered to ACP via a thioester linkage, undergoes a series of extension modules. BorA2 has one extension module that loads malonyl-CoA and has a ketoreductase to reduce the β-carbonyl to a hydroxyl group. Next, BorA3, consisting of modules 2 and 3, which load malonyl-CoA and methylmalonyl-CoA, respectively, have both ketoreductase and dehydratase enzymes. BorA4 only has one extension module, loading methylmalonyl-CoA and having a ketoreductase as a tailoring enzyme. The next three chain extensions are catalyzed by BorA5, which is done through three iterative rounds of elongation and condensations with methylmalonyl-CoA from where the polyketide intermediates undergo modifications by KR, DH, and ER. Lastly, BorA6 loads malonyl-CoA, modifies the polyketide intermediate via a ketoreductase enzyme, and terminates the PKS cycle by a thioesterase, which releases the polyketide to form pre-Borrelidin.

The formation of the nitrile moiety of borrelidin is done by post-PKS modifications from gene products of BorI, BorJ, and BorK. The BorI gene product, a cytochrome 450 hydroxylase catalyzes the oxidation of the C12 methyl group into an allylic alcohol, which can undergo further oxidation by the gene products of BorI or BorK, an oxidoreductase, to form the formyl intermediate. The BorJ gene product, a PMP-dependent transaminase, then introduces an amine into the polyketide, generating intermediate Borrelidin B. BorI then catalyzes the conversion of the amine to an N,N-dihydroxy species and the dehydration to form borrelidin via an aldoxime intermediate.
